= Black Sands =

Blacks Sands may refer to the following:

- Black Sands (album), an album by Bonobo
- Black Sands, a novel by Colleen Coble
- Black Sands, Hawaii, a community in Hawaii
- Black Sands (TV series), an Icelandic television series

== See also ==
- Black Sands Entertainment
