= Late Night Tales: Django Django =

Compilation album by Django Django
- Released: 11 May 2014
- Label: Night Time Stories
- Producer: Dave MacLean
- Compiler: Dave MacLean

Django Django chronology
Django Django (2012)	Late Night Tales: Django Django (2014)	Born Under Saturn (2015)

Late Night Tales chronology
Late Night Tales: Bonobo (2013)	Late Night Tales: Django Django (2014)	Late Night Tales Presents After Dark: Nightshift (2014)

Late Night Tales: Django Django is a mix album compiled by British band Django Django, released on 11 May 2014 as part of the Late Night Tales series. The mix includes tracks from artists such as The Beach Boys, Primal Scream, Outkast, Massive Attack and Philip Glass. It also features an exclusive Django Django cover version of The Monkees’ "Porpoise Song".

== Track listing ==
No.	Title	Artist(s)	Length
1.	"The Tennessee Toad"	Leo Kottke
2.	"Game Love"	Gulp
3.	"Nautilus"	Bob James
4.	"Inner City Blues"	James Last
5.	"Bone"	Map Of Africa
6.	"Get Closer"	Seals & Crofts
7.	"Floe"	Philip Glass
8.	"To Claudia On Thursday"	The Millennium
9.	"Surf's Up"	The Beach Boys
10.	"Carry Me Home"	Primal Scream
11.	"Man Next Door"	Massive Attack
12.	"Bugg'n"	TNGHT
13.	"Slum Beautiful"	Outkast
14.	"Why Can't We Live Together"	Timmy Thomas
15.	"Gabriel"	Roy Davis Jr.
16.	"Coconut"	Harry Nilsson
17.	"Poor Moon"	Canned Heat
18.	"Bass Drums"	Ramadanman
19.	"Future Directions"	Rick Miller
20.	"Porpoise Song (Exclusive Monkees Cover Version)"	Django Django
21.	"Flat of Angles Part 4"	Benedict Cumberbatch
