= Giants (Andreya Triana album) =

Studio album by Andreya Triana
- Released: 4 May 2015
- Genre: R&B; soul
- Length: 45:49
- Label: Counter
- Producer: Aqualung; Paul Staveley O'Duffy; Mike Peden

Andreya Triana chronology
Lost Where I Belong (2010)	Giants (2015)	Life in Colour (2019)

Singles from Giants
- 1. "Song for a Friend" Released: 15 May 2013; 2. "Everything You Never Had Pt. II" Released: 15 September 2014; 3. "Gold" Released: 13 March 2015; 4. "Playing with Fire" Released: 21 August 2015

Professional ratings
Review scores
Source	Rating
Clash	6/10
Exclaim!	9/10
London Evening Standard	4/5 stars
MusicOMH	3/5 stars
The Observer	3/5 stars
The Yorkshire Times	4/5

Giants is the second studio album by British singer-songwriter Andreya Triana. It was released by Counter Records on 4 May 2015. The lead single, "Gold", was released on 13 March 2015. The album was produced largely by Aqualung, with additional production from Paul Staveley O'Duffy and Mike Peden. It peaked at number 59 on the UK Albums Chart.

== Track listing ==
Giants – Standard edition
No.	Title	Writer(s)	Producer(s)	Length
1.	"Paperwalls"	Andreya Triana; Matt "Aqualung" Hales	Aqualung	3:51
2.	"Gold"	Triana; Alex Hayes; Dee Adam; Hannah Vasanth	Aqualung	3:43
3.	"That's Alright with Me"	Triana; Paul Staveley O'Duffy	O'Duffy	4:09
4.	"Lullaby"	Triana; Hales	Aqualung	3:40
5.	"Giants"	Triana; Hales	Aqualung	4:22
6.	"Heart in My Hands"	Triana; Hales; Adam	Aqualung	3:39
7.	"Keep Running"	Triana; Jenn Decilveo; Nick Rosen	Aqualung	3:18
8.	"The Changing Shapes of Love"	Triana; Adam; A. Hayes; Ed Hayes	Aqualung	3:27
9.	"Clutterbug"	Triana; Hales	Aqualung	4:01
10.	"Song for a Friend"	Triana; Adam; Alan Kasirye	Mike Peden	3:55
11.	"It's Not Over"	Triana; O'Duffy	Aqualung	3:20
12.	"Everything You Never Had Pt. II"	Triana; Adam; Ben Collier	Aqualung	4:24
Total length:				45:49

Giants – Deluxe edition
No.	Title	Writer(s)	Length
13.	"Playing with Fire"		3:49
14.	"Superlove"		4:10
15.	"Love & War" (demo)		3:31
16.	"Stay with Me" (Chris Evans radio session)	Sam Smith; James Napier; William Phillips; Tom Petty; Jeff Lynne	2:51
17.	"You Do Something to Me" (Chris Evans radio session)	Cole Porter	3:32
18.	"God Bless the Child" (Jamie Cullum radio show)	Billie Holiday; Arthur Herzog Jr.	4:42
Total length:			78:24

Giants – Bonus remix CD
No.	Title	Writer(s)	Producer(s)	Length
13.	"Superlove"			4:10
14.	"Gold" (Fakear remix)	Triana; A. Hayes; Adam; Vasanth	Aqualung; Fakear	3:37
15.	"Gold" (Nikitch remix)	Triana; A. Hayes; Adam; Vasanth	Aqualung; Nikitch	5:15
16.	"Gold" (Karma Kid remix)	Triana; A. Hayes; Adam; Vasanth	Aqualung; Karma Kid	4:11
17.	"Gold" (Max Graef remix)	Triana; A. Hayes; Adam; Vasanth	Aqualung; Max Graef	3:36
18.	"Gold" (Shigeto remix)	Triana; A. Hayes; Adam; Vasanth	Aqualung; Shigeto	5:55
19.	"Gold" (Fort Romeau remix)	Triana; A. Hayes; Adam; Vasanth	Aqualung; Fort Romeau	6:01
20.	"Gold" (Medlar remix)	Triana; A. Hayes; Adam; Vasanth	Aqualung; Medlar	6:25
21.	"Gold" (Logistics remix)	Triana; A. Hayes; Adam; Vasanth	Aqualung; Logistics	4:39
22.	"Gold" (Hackman remix)	Triana; A. Hayes; Adam; Vasanth	Aqualung; Hackman	4:08

== Personnel ==
Credits adapted from liner notes.

- Andreya Triana – vocals, glockenspiel
- Matt Hales – guitar, bass guitar, piano, keyboards, programming
- Paul O'Duffy – piano, keyboards, programming
- Josh Wilkinson – piano
- Clifford Carter – keyboards
- Ben Hales – guitar, bass guitar
- Tim Cansfield – guitar
- Ed Hayes – guitar
- Dave Eggar – cello
- Rachel Golub – violin

== Charts ==
Chart	Peak position
UK Albums (OCC)	59
