= Late Night Tales: Bonobo =

Compilation album by Bonobo
- Released: 17 November 2013
- Genre: Electronica
- Length: 1:14:59
- Label: Night Time Stories
- Producer: Simon Green
- Compiler: Simon Green

Bonobo chronology
The North Borders (2013)	Late Night Tales: Bonobo (2013)	Migration (2017)

Late Night Tales chronology
Late Night Tales: Röyksopp (2013)	Late Night Tales: Bonobo (2013)	Late Night Tales: Django Django (2014)

Professional ratings
Aggregate scores
Source	Rating
Metacritic	88/100
Review scores
Source	Rating
Exclaim!	9/10

Late Night Tales: Bonobo is a mix album compiled by British musician Bonobo, released on 17 November 2013 as part of the Late Night Tales series. The mix includes tracks from artists such as Nina Simone, Lapalux, Bill Evans, The Invisible and Dorothy Ashby. It also features an exclusive Bonobo cover version of Donovan's "Get Thy Bearings".

== Track listing ==
No.	Title	Artist(s)	Length
1.	"An Ending, a Beginning"	Dustin O'Halloran	2:10
2.	"A Calf Born in Winter"	Khruangbin	3:15
3.	"Get Thy Bearings" (Exclusive Donovan cover version)	Bonobo (featuring Szjerdene)	2:58
4.	"Didn’t I"	Darondo	3:19
5.	"Baltimore"	Nina Simone	4:30
6.	"Flipside"	Hypnotic Brass Ensemble	2:29
7.	"The Traitor"	Menahan Street Band	2:29
8.	"Flowers"	Andrew Ashong	5:54
9.	"Down the Line (It Takes a Number)"	Romare	4:15
10.	"Places"	Shlohmo	2:51
11.	"Gutter Glitter"	Lapalux	2:37
12.	"Wings (Floating Points remix)"	The Invisible	4:08
13.	"Hedron"	Badbadnotgood	1:55
14.	"VIII. Juliet" (Track 8 on Montauk Variations)	Matthew Bourne	3:20
15.	"South Congress"	Airhead	3:25
16.	"Sailing Out to Sea"	Matthew Halsall	1:30
17.	"Essence of Sapphire"	Dorothy Ashby	3:10
18.	"One Thing" (Cover of 1 Thing by Amerie)	Peter and Kerry	3:28
19.	"Gigantic"	Eddi Front	3:20
20.	"Peace Piece"	Bill Evans	8:39
21.	"Flat of Angles, Part 3" (Exclusive spoken word piece)	Benedict Cumberbatch	6:32
Total length:			74:59
