= Andreya Triana =

British singer and songwriter

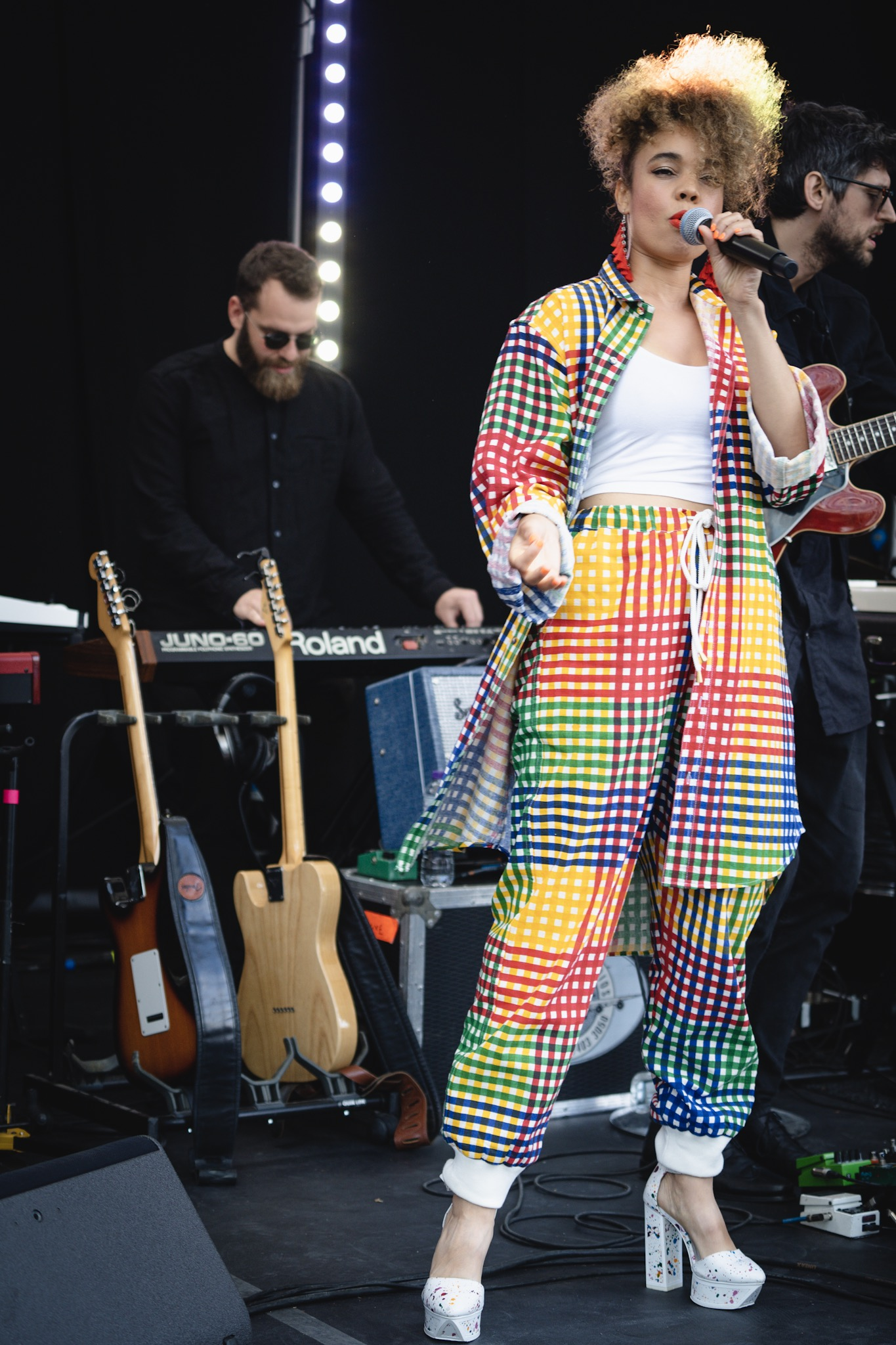
- Triana in 2019

Background information
- Born: London, England
- Genres: Soul, jazz, acoustic
- Occupation: Singer-songwriter
- Labels: Hi-Tea Records, Counter Records, Ninja Tune
- Website: www.andreyatriana.com

Andreya Triana is a British singer and songwriter, Red Bull Music Academy alumna and MOBO nominated artist hailing from South East London, Her debut album, Lost Where I Belong released in September 2010 on London based record label Ninja Tune and featured singles such as "A Town Called Obsolete", "Far Closer" and the title track "Lost where I belong". The album was produced by British musician, DJ Simon Green a.k.a. Bonobo. The album was later labelled as "Best Album of 2010" by Charles Aaron of Spin.

Triana's second album, Giants was released in May 2015 on Counter Records, and peaked at number 59 on the Official UK Albums Chart. The lead single from the album Gold expanded Triana's fanbase and gained exposure after a string of television performances on The One Show, The John Bishop Show, and Later with Jools Holland. The track was also featured in the 2020 Nissan Vera advert.

Triana's best known work features songs such as "Song For A Friend", "Gold", and "Woman", which have featured in multiple TV and film pieces.

Triana's third album Life in Colour was released in May 2019 on Hi-Tea Records. Triana collaborated with multiple producers for Life in Colour, notably French Grammy-nominated musician and DJ Dimitri Tikovoï who produced the majority of the album. The album was described as a "finger clicking, booty popping collection of summery joy" by Clash magazine features the singles "Woman", "Freedom", and "Broke".

== Early life and education ==
Triana moved to Worcestershire in the West Midlands age 14. At 17 she started doing open mic night at a local music venue where the owner introduced her to a collective of musicians, with whom she formed a group called Bootis. While studying for a degree in music technology in Leeds, Triana decided to re-form Bootis with new members and a new multi-genre sound.

Soon, her love for improvisation would birth her Freeflo Sessions - a one woman show using a sampler to loop vocals, percussive sounds, and beats live. As a result of touring extensively with her Freeflo Sessions, she was selected in 2006 to participate in the Red Bull Music Academy in Australia, where she further developed her style for improvisation and developed strong links within the music industry.

== Inspiration ==
Triana is an experimental, self-taught, singer, and songwriter originally hailing from South East London. Her husky voice is reminiscent of predecessors Lauryn Hill. Her style has been described as a fusion of soul, jazz, and pop. Triana has named a few of her greatest inspirations as Aretha Franklin, Stevie Wonder, Bill Withers, and Björk.

== Touring / gigs ==
In 2009, Triana toured the US and Canada with the Bonobo live band, and shortly afterwards played the BBC Introducing Stage at Glastonbury Festival in 2010. Triana has also played stages at multiple festivals, notably Soundwave Festival, The Great Escape, Secret Garden Party, Bestival, Outlook, and Big Chill Festival.

Triana reached new heights in 2015 as she made her second appearance, performing live at Glastonbury Festival on the Greenpeace Stage, and headlining a sold-out show at the historic venue KOKO in London.

Her largest audience was a main stage performance to 50,000 people for BBC Radio 2 - Live in Hyde Park in 2016.

Triana has also had a string of DJ performances featuring sets at BlackSITTER - The Cactus Hound Bar and Gilles Peterson's We Out Here festival.

As of 2021, Triana joined UK neo-soul collective Jungle as an active touring member, replacing longtime backup vocalist Rudi Salmon.

== Awards ==
In 2016, Triana was invited to be a judge for Best Album at the Ivor Novello awards alongside fellow musicians Tinchy Stryder and Sharleen Spiteri.

At the 2015 MOBO awards, Triana was nominated for Best R&B/Soul Act and later performed ‘Playing With Fire’ on the main stage at the awards to a sea of her fellow musicians.

== Television / media features ==
Andreya's music has featured in shows such as The Good Wife, Grey's Anatomy, Being Mary Jane, Self Made, and When They See Us, which collected 23 million viewers within its first month.

August 2021 - "Beautiful People" from Triana's album Life in Colour featured on NBA 2K-22

March 2020 - "Woman" from Triana's album Life in Colour featured on Self Made Season 1, Ep 2

July 2019 - "Beautiful People" from Triana's album Life in Colour featured on Love Island (UK) Season 5, Ep 25

June 2019 - "Heart In My Hands" from Triana's album Giants featured on Love Island (UK) Season 5, Ep 3

June 2019 - "Woman" from Triana's album Life in Colour featured on Schwarzkopf Live XXL advert for their campaign #GENERATIONCOLOUR

May 2019 - "Song For A Friend" from Triana's album Giants featured on When They See Us Season 1, Ep 3

March 2019 - "Woman" from Triana's album Life in Colour featured on Good Trouble Season 1, Ep 9

September 2019 - "Gold" from Triana's album Giants featured on the 2020 Nissan Versa advert and also in Target's "Good We Can All Afford" campaign.

July 2018 - "Lullaby" from Triana's album Giants featured on Our Girl Season 3, Ep 12

January 2018 - "Gold" from Triana's album Giants featured on Burden of Truth Season 1, Ep 3

September 2018 - "Beautiful People" from Triana's album Life in Colour featured on EA Sports FIFA 19 Soundtrack

July 2017 - "Gold" from Triana's album Giants featured on So You Think You Can Dance Season 14, Ep7

June 2017 - "Heart In My Hands" from Triana's album Giants featured on Queen Sugar Season 2, Ep 2

March 2017 - "Heart In My Hands" from Triana's album Giants featured on Grace and Frankie Season 3, Ep 10

Feb 2017 - "Gold" from Triana's album Giants featured on Being Mary Jane Season 4, Ep 7

November 2016 - "Lost Where I Belong" from Triana's album Lost Where I Belong featured on Queen Sugar Season 1, Ep 13

October 2016 - "Heart In My Hands" from Triana's album Giants featured on Grey's Anatomy Season 13, Ep 3

September 2014 - Andreya's track "Better Days To Come" Featured on Forza Horizon 2

June 2014 - "Draw the Stars" from Triana's album Lost Where I Belong featured on Chasing Life Season 1, Ep 1

March 2013 - "Draw the Stars" from Triana's album Lost Where I Belong featured on The Good Wife Season 4, Ep 17

October 2010 - "Draw the Stars" from Triana's album Lost Where I Belong featured on 90210 Season 3, Ep 5

== Live television performances ==
October 2015 - Live Performance of Gold on Chris Evans' TFI Friday

December 2015 - Live Performance Sunday Brunch

April 2015 - Live Performance of "Gold" on Later... with Jools Holland

May 2015 - Live Performance of "Gold" on The One Show

June 2015 - Live Performance of "Gold" at Glastonbury Festival.

July 2015 - Live Performance of "Gold" on The John Bishop Show

August 2019 - Live Performance of "Freedom" on The One Show.

== Feature collaborations / sessions ==
During her time at Red Bull Music Academy, Triana collaborated with electronic musician and producer Flying Lotus to create "Tea Leaf Dancers". The track was hailed as a classic, getting rave reviews from Benji B and Gilles Peterson while getting airplay on Annie Mac's Radio One show.

DJ and musician Simon Green, better known by his stage name Bonobo, featured Triana's vocals on 2010 album Black Sands on the tracks "Eyes Down", "The Keeper", and "Stay The Same"

In 2013 Triana also featured on Breach’s Top 10 single "Everything You Never Had (We Had It All)", which reached no. 9 on the Official Singles chart.

Triana also featured on Los Angeles-based producer Tokimonsta’s 2013 album Half Shadows on the track "Green"

Triana featured on the tracks "U never know" and "Puzzle" from Essex-based electronic producer Lapalux’s 2015 album Lustmore.

Triana joined jazz artist Jamie Cullum in the Radio 2 studio in 2018 for a rendition of "Silent Night".

Triana collaborated with Bristol-based artist, Henry Green, featuring on the tracks "Tide" and "More" from Henry's 2020 album Half Light.

Triana is also the main feature artist The Vision's debut self titled album.

TEDx Frankfurt

In November 2019 Triana was a guest speaker at TEDx Frankfurt, where she also performed renditions of her tracks "A Town Called Obsolete" and "Woman"

Mahogany Sessions

In 2019 Triana was invited to perform at the infamous Mahogany Sessions where she gave a rendition of ‘Broke’ from her 2019 album ‘Life in Colour’. Other artists to be invited to perform for Mahogany Sessions feature Billy Eiilish, James Bay, and Jake Bugg.

Sofar Sounds

Triana has been invited to perform with Sofar Sounds twice now, firstly in 2015 where she performed ‘That's Alright With Me’ from her sophomore album ‘Giants’ and secondly in 2019 where she performed ‘Woman’ from her third album ‘Life in Colour’. Andreya's 2015 performance is Sofar’s most watched video in Europe with 4 million views.

== Discography ==
=== Albums ===
Album title	Release date	Tracks	Label	Format
Lost Where I Belong	6 September 2010	9	Ninja Tune	Digital Download, CD, Vinyl
Giants	4 May 2015	12	Counter Records	Digital Download, CD, Vinyl
Giants (Deluxe Edition)	13 November 2015	18	Counter Records	Digital Download, CD
Life In Colour	24 May 2019	11	Hi-Tea Records	Digital Download, CD, Vinyl

=== EP's ===
EP title	Release date	Tracks	Label	Format
Lost Where I Belong - EP	5 April 2010	5	Ninja Tune	Digital Download, CD
A Town Called Obsolete - EP	26 July 2010	4	Ninja Tune	Digital Download, CD
Far Closer - EP	7 February 2011	4	Ninja Tune	Digital Download, CD
Everything You Never Had, Pt. II - EP	14 November 2014	4	Counter Records	Digital Download
Gold - EP	13 March 2015	7	Counter Records	Digital Download
Woman - EP	20 November 2018	3	Hi-Tea Records	Digital Download

=== Singles ===
Single	Album	Release date
Lost Where I Belong	Lost Where I Belong	5 April 2010
A Town Called Obsolete	Lost Where I Belong	26 July 2010
Far Closer	Lost Where I Belong	7 February 2011
Song For A Friend	Giants	15 May 2013
Everything You Never Had, Pt. II	Giants	14 November 2014
Gold	Giants	13 March 2015
That's Alright With Me	Giants	7 May 2015
Playing With Fire	Giants (Deluxe Edition)	16 October 2015
Woman	Life In Colour	20 November 2018
Broke	Life In Colour	11 January 2019
Freedom	Life In Colour	8 April 2019
The Best	The Best (Single)	30 October 2019
By Your Side	By Your Side (Single)	20 November 2019
Girl	Girl (Single)	29 January 2020
Hard Place	Hard Place (Single)	8 April 2020

=== Features ===
Artist	Album title	Track	Year
Henry Green	Half Light	"Tide"	2020
Henry Green	Half Light	"More"	2020
DJ Zinc	Friends And Fam	"Baby It's You"	2020
The Vision	The Vision	"Remember"	2020
The Vision	The Vision	"Mountains"	2020
The Vision	The Vision	"Missing"	2020
The Vision	The Vision	"Satisfy"	2020
The Vision	The Vision	"Heaven"	2020
The Vision	The Vision	"Home"	2020
Jake Isaac	10 Steps To Heaven	"10 Steps To Heaven"	2019
Mousse T.	Where Is The Love	"Broken Blues"	2019
Pablo Nouvelle	Wired	"Sunshine In Stereo"	2018
Bondax	Revolve	"Real Thing"	2018
Simon Field	Wildfire	"Wildfire"	2018
Wilkinson	Hypnotic	"Take Us Home"	2017
Shaun Escoffery	Evergreen	"Here Comes The Rain Again"	2016
Fakear	Animal	"Light Bullet"	2016
Nikitch	All The Best	"When It All Falls Down	2016
Lapalux	Lustmore	"U Never Know"	2015
Lapalux	Lustmore	"Puzzle"	2015
Karma Kid	Bird Of Prey	"Intro"	2015
TOKiMONSTA	Half Shadows	"Green"	2013
Breach	Everything You Never Had (We Had It All)	"Everything You Never Had (We Had It All)"	2013
Manu Delago	Bigger Than Home	"A Long Way"	2013
Bonobo	Black Sands	"Eyesdown"	2010
Bonobo	Black Sands	"The Keeper'	2010
Bonobo	Black Sands	"Stay The Same"	2010
TM Juke, The Jack Baker Trio	Boto And The Second Liners	"That Gut Feeling"	2009
Homecut	No Freedom Without Sacrifice	"Breakdown"	2009
Mr Scruff	Ninja Tuna	"Hold On"	2008
Various Artists	Karen P ...broad casting	"Brighter Days"	2008
Natural Self	The Art Of Vibration	"The Rising"	2008
Flying Lotus	Reset	"Tea Leaf Dancers"	2007
Kidkanevil	Problems & Solutions	"Good Morning, Whats New?"	2007

=== Remixes ===
Album	Track name	Remix	Year
Lost Where I Belong	Lost Where I Belong	Flying Lotus Remix	2010
Lost Where I Belong	Lost Where I Belong	Alex Banks Remix	2010
Lost Where I Belong	A Town Called Obsolete	Mount Kimbie Remix	2010
Lost Where I Belong	Far Closer	Mr Scruff Remix	2011
Lost Where I Belong	Far Closer	Tokimonsta Remix	2011
Giants	Lullaby	Shigeto Remix	2015
Giants	Lullaby	Logistics Remix	2015
Giants	Lullaby	Medlar Remix	2015
Giants	Gold	Kid karma Remix	2015
Giants	Gold	Fort Romeau Remix	2015
Giants	Gold	Hackman Remix	2015
Giants	Gold	Max Graef Remix	2015
Giants	Gold	Nikitch Remix	2015
Giants	Gold	Fakear Remix	2015
Life In Colour	Woman	Nimmo Remix	2018
Life In Colour	Woman	Bondax Remix	2018
Life In Colour	Broke	Shan Remix	2019
Life In Colour	Broke	Conny Remix	2019
Life In Colour	Broke	Ben Westbeech Remix	2021
