= Animal Magic =

Animal Magic may refer to:

- Animal Magic (TV series), a BBC children's television series, 1962–1983
- Animal Magic (The Blow Monkeys album), 1986
- Animal Magic (Bonobo album), 2000
- "Animal Magic" (song), by Belouis Some, 1987
- Animal Magic, a 1984 album by Australian band QED
- "Animal Magic", a song by Peter Gabriel from his 1978 self-titled album
