= Fragments (Bonobo album) =

Studio album by Bonobo
- Released: 14 January 2022
- Genre: Electronica; house
- Length: 51:16
- Label: Ninja Tune
- Producer: Simon Green

Bonobo chronology
Migration (2017)	Fragments (2022)	Distance in Static (2026)

Singles from Fragments
- 1. "Rosewood" Released: 6 October 2021; 2. "Tides" Released: 20 October 2021; 3. "Otomo" Released: 10 November 2021; 4. "Shadows" Released: 1 December 2021; 5. "From You" Released: 3 January 2022

Fragments is the seventh studio album by British musician Bonobo. It was released on 14 January 2022 under Ninja Tune and was nominated for Best Dance/Electronic Album for the 65th Grammy Awards.

== Background and singles ==
Bonobo recorded Fragments in a self-built studio in Los Angeles during the COVID-19 pandemic in 2020 and 2021. Fragments features numerous collaborations with other artists, among them Jordan Rakei, Jamila Woods, Joji, Kadhja Bonet, O'Flynn, and Miguel Atwood-Ferguson. Instead of having his collaborators perform pre-written music, Bonobo collected "a wide range of material in the studio with collaborators” and edited their recordings later. Due to the pandemic, collaborations on the album were done remotely, which Bonobo felt made the music more intimate. One collaborator, the harpist Lara Somogyi, was featured on multiple songs. Bonobo recorded her playing the harp over one session, and incorporated samples of her playing throughout the album. The album contains both elements of downtempo and dance.

Bonobo released the first single for Fragments, "Rosewood", on 6 October 2021. He released "Tides", featuring Jamila Woods, on 20 October, and "Otomo", featuring O'Flynn, on 10 November. "Shadows", featuring Jordan Rakei, was released on 1 December and "From You", featuring Joji, was released on 3 January 2022.

== Reception ==
Professional ratings
Aggregate scores
Source	Rating
Metacritic	76/100
Review scores
Source	Rating
AllMusic	3.5/5 stars
Clash	8/10
Exclaim!	9/10
The Line of Best Fit	8/10
Mojo	8/10
musicOMH	2.5/5 stars
NME	4/5 stars
The Observer	4/5 stars
Pitchfork	5.4/10
Uncut	7/10

According to the review aggregator Metacritic, Fragments received "generally favorable reviews" based on a weighted average score of 74 out of 100 from sixteen critic scores. Dylan Barnabe wrote in Exclaim!: “It is an album to find love again; to reignite creativity; to regain hope; to find connection.” Robin Damien Morris stated in the Observer that Fragments is "brilliant, wondrous work". Murray wrote in Clash that Fragments "rewards repeated listens, with patience allowing these fresh elements to rise to the surface". Thomas Smith of NME considered it to be "most engaging record [Bonobo] has released since 2010's Black Sands – it is light, airy and remarkably well pieced together". Dave Beech wrote in the Line of Best Fit that "both personally and otherwise, Fragments is Bonobo's strongest record yet". Paul Simpson wrote in AllMusic that Bonobo's "productions [on Fragments] are just the right balance of lush and gritty".

In a mixed review, Sam Goldner wrote in Pitchfork that "the album amounts to little more than a modern-day take on easy listening". Ben Devlin wrote in musicOMH that "Fragments does not outstay its welcome, but only because it isn’t distinctive enough to be consciously welcomed in the first place".

== Track listing ==
Fragments track listing
No.	Title	Writer(s)	Length
1.	"Polyghost" (featuring Miguel Atwood-Ferguson)	Simon Green; Miguel Atwood-Ferguson	1:48
2.	"Shadows" (featuring Jordan Rakei)	Green; Jordan Rakei	4:45
3.	"Rosewood"	Green	4:02
4.	"Otomo" (featuring O'Flynn)	Green; Ben Norris	6:11
5.	"Tides" (featuring Jamila Woods)	Green; Atwell-Ferguson; Jamila Woods	3:46
6.	"Elysian"	Green; Thomas Lea	3:02
7.	"Closer"	Green	5:11
8.	"Age of Phase"	Green	5:42
9.	"From You" (featuring Joji)	Green; George Miller	3:30
10.	"Counterpart"	Green	5:32
11.	"Sapien"	Green	4:03
12.	"Day by Day" (featuring Kadhja Bonet)	Green; Atwood-Ferguson; Kadhja Bonet	3:44
Total length:			51:16

Japanese edition (bonus track)
No.	Title	Writer(s)	Length
13.	"Landforms"	Green	3:37
Total length:			55:07

== Personnel ==
According to Allmusic:

- Simon Green – production, mixing
- Frank Merritt – mastering, engineering, cutting
- Neil Krug – artwork
- Mat Maitland – design

== Charts ==
Chart performance for Fragments
Chart (2022)	Peak position
Australian Albums (ARIA)	6
Austrian Albums (Ö3 Austria)	15
Belgian Albums (Ultratop Flanders)	11
Belgian Albums (Ultratop Wallonia)	10
Dutch Albums (Album Top 100)	9
French Albums (SNEP)	59
German Albums (Offizielle Top 100)	3
New Zealand Albums (RMNZ)	34
Scottish Albums (OCC)	3
Swiss Albums (Schweizer Hitparade)	8
UK Albums (OCC)	5
UK Dance Albums (OCC)	1
UK Independent Albums (OCC)	2
