= Off Planet =

Studio album by Django Django
- Released: 16 June 2023
- Length: 79:48
- Label: Because
- Producer: David Maclean

Django Django chronology
| Glowing in the Dark (2021) | Off Planet (2023) | Doveland (2026) |

Off Planet is the fifth studio album by British band Django Django, released on 16 June 2023 by Because Music. It is a concept album, with each of its four parts representing a planet. Off Planet was originally released as three separate EPs from February to April 2023, with the fourth part being released alongside the album. The album includes collaborations with Self Esteem, Jack Peñate, Toya Delazy and Stealing Sheep, among others.

== Critical reception ==
Professional ratings
Aggregate scores
| Source | Rating |
|---|---|
| AnyDecentMusic? | 7.1/10 |
| Metacritic | 81/100 |
Review scores
| Source | Rating |
| AllMusic | 4.5/5 stars |
| Clash | 6/10 |
| MusicOMH | 3.5/5 stars |

Off Planet received a score of 81 out of 100 on review aggregator Metacritic based on five critics' reviews, indicating "universal acclaim". Uncut called the album's length "a little exhausting" but felt that "there's no denying that this is the band's most accomplished and ambitious record to date". Reviewing the album for Clash, Natalia Quiros Edmund wrote that Off Planet "does much to contain the multitudes of a galaxy. And its soundscapes are just as vast, drawing on bluesy pop, middle eastern cabaret goth, afro acid, and piano rave to name but a few". Edmund ultimately called it "a playful reimagining of a traditional album structure which delivers danceable bluesy beats, percussion-driven synth pop, and disco grooves made for the summer".

Timothy Monger of AllMusic described it as "an ambitious, guest-heavy project that pushes them in new directions without abandoning their wily charm" as well as "ostensibly a dance record rooted in techno, rave, hip-hop, and other beat-driven styles". Monger concluded that "rarely does a double album (or a quadruple EP?) sound so revitalizing, but Django Django somehow pull it off on their best release in years". John Murphy of MusicOMH found the "collaborations are the high points" of the project, which he felt "seems a bit mammoth at first (touching 90 minutes and at 21 tracks) so the instrumentals scattered amongst the album feel like a decent palate cleaner". Although feeling there is "a lot to take in", he commented that "one of the impressive things about Off Planet is how comfortable the band sound, no matter what style the song is".

== Track listing ==
Disc 1
| No. | Title | Length |
|---|---|---|
| 1. | "Wishbone" | 4:11 |
| 2. | "Complete Me" (featuring Self Esteem) | 4:46 |
| 3. | "Osaka" | 3:19 |
| 4. | "Hands High" (featuring Refound) | 3:19 |
| 5. | "Lunar Vibrations" (featuring Isabelle Woodhouse) | 5:32 |

Disc 2
| No. | Title | Length |
|---|---|---|
| 1. | "Don't Touch That Dial" (featuring Yuuko Sings) | 3:19 |
| 2. | "Back 2 Back" (featuring Patience) | 4:10 |
| 3. | "Squid Inc." | 3:30 |
| 4. | "Come Down" | 2:54 |
| 5. | "Golden Cross" | 4:00 |

Disc 3
| No. | Title | Length |
|---|---|---|
| 1. | "No Time" (featuring Jack Peñate) | 3:39 |
| 2. | "A New Way Through" | 4:03 |
| 3. | "Galaxy Mood" (featuring Toya Delazy) | 3:17 |
| 4. | "The Oh Zone" | 2:10 |
| 5. | "Dead Machine" (featuring Stealing Sheep) | 2:37 |
| 6. | "Dumdrum" | 3:54 |

Disc 4
| No. | Title | Length |
|---|---|---|
| 1. | "Fluxus" | 2:54 |
| 2. | "Slipstream" | 5:07 |
| 3. | "Who You Know" (featuring Bernardo) | 3:42 |
| 4. | "Black Cadillac" | 4:04 |
| 5. | "Gazelle" | 5:21 |
| Total length: | | 79:48 |

== Charts ==
Chart performance for Off Planet
| Chart (2023) | Peak position |
|---|---|
| Scottish Albums (Official Charts) | 35 |
| UK Albums (Official Charts) | 91 |
| UK Independent Albums (Official Charts) | 8 |
