= Dial 'M' for Monkey =

Dial 'M' for Monkey may refer to:

- Dial M for Monkey, a back-up segment featured in early episodes of Dexter's Laboratory
- Dial 'M' for Monkey (album), a 2003 album by Bonobo
