= Django Django =

British rock band

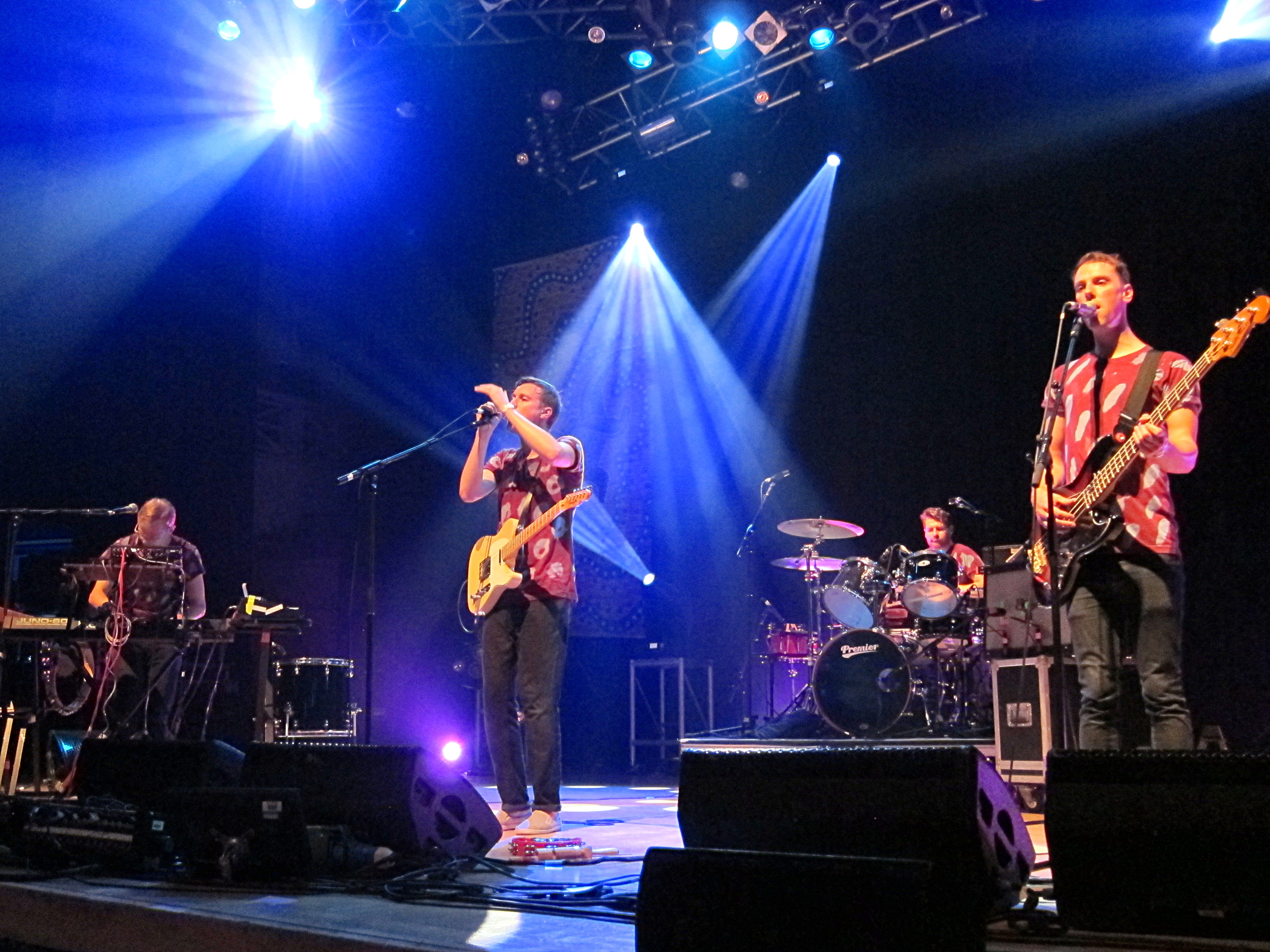
- Django Django performing live in Leicester in August 2012

Background information
- Origin: London, England
- Genres: Art rock; neo-psychedelia; electronic; electronic rock; indie rock; progressive rock
- Years active: 2009–present
- Labels: Because Music; Clouds Hill
- Members: David Maclean; Vincent Neff; Jimmy Dixon; Tommy Grace
- Website: www.djangodjango.co.uk

Django Django are a British art rock band based in London, England. Formed in 2009, the band has released six studio albums starting with their self-titled debut in 2012. Their latest album Doveland was released on 6 November 2026.

== History ==
=== Formation ===
The quartet of David Maclean (drummer and producer), Vincent Neff (singer and guitarist), Jimmy Dixon (bassist) and Tommy Grace (synthesizer operator) met at Edinburgh College of Art, and formed Django Django in London in 2009.

David Maclean is the son of artist Marian Leven, brother of musician and director John Maclean and cousin of singer Lindsey Leven who performs with Guto Pryce in the band Gulp. Maclean and Grace are Scottish; Neff is originally from Northern Ireland while Dixon hails from Yorkshire.

"Our name has absolutely nothing to do with Django Reinhardt" wrote the band (nicknamed djangovideo in their account on YouTube) beneath the video post for their track WOR.

=== Django Django ===
Because Music released the band's self-titled debut album on 30 January 2012. The album featured already released singles "Waveforms" and "Default." The debut album reached number 33 on the UK album charts in the first week of release. It was then nominated for the 2012 Mercury Prize. Their song "Hail Bop" was featured in the football video game by EA Sports, FIFA 13 and "Waveforms" in Grand Theft Auto V. The album received considerable critical acclaim, and featured in the end-of-year lists of both Rolling Stone and the NME. The band were surprised to achieve this success with Maclean commenting "I thought it would be an underground album that would sell a few hundred copies.”

=== Born Under Saturn ===
The band's second full-length album, Born Under Saturn, was released on 4 May 2015.

=== Marble Skies ===
The band's third full-length album, Marble Skies, was released on 26 January 2018. Their song Tic Tac Toe also featured in the EA Sports soccer game, FIFA 18. On 12 October 2018 the band released the Winter's Beach EP.

=== Glowing in the Dark ===
On 12 November 2020, the band announced their fourth studio album, Glowing in the Dark, would be released on 12 February 2021, and released the title track.

=== Off Planet ===
The band's fifth full-length studio album was released on 16 June 2023. Released in four parts, each as a separate "planet," Off Planet features a host of guest appearances – including Self Esteem, Jack Peñate, Stealing Sheep and Toya Delazy.

=== Doveland ===
In June 2026, the band announced their sixth album Doveland and released a single, Cameos, from it. The album was released on 6 November 2026.

== Discography ==
=== Studio albums ===
List of studio albums, with selected chart positions
Title	Album details	Peak chart positions										Certifications
Title	Album details	UK	AUS	BEL (FL)	BEL (WA)	FRA	IRL	NED	SCO	SWI	US Heat	Certifications
Django Django	Released: 30 January 2012; Label: Because Music, Ribbon Music; Formats: CD, LP, digital download	33	60	26	105	68	63	43	26	—	13	UK: Silver; FRA: Platinum
Born Under Saturn	Released: 4 May 2015; Label: Because Music, Ribbon Music; Formats: CD, LP, digital download	15	56	55	67	34	31	60	11	57	9	
Marble Skies	Released: 26 January 2018; Label: Because Music, Ribbon Music; Formats: CD, LP, digital download	20	—	95	112	92	—	120	12	—	19	
Glowing in the Dark	Released: 12 February 2021; Label: Because Music, Ribbon Music; Formats: CD, LP, digital download	68	—	—	—	186	—	—	7	81	—	
Off Planet	Released: 16 June 2023; Label: Because Music, Ribbon Music; Formats: CD, LP, digital download	91	—	—	—	—	—	—	35	—	—	
Doveland	Released: 6 November 2026; Label: Because Music, Ribbon Music; Formats: CD, LP, digital download	—	—	—	—	—	—	—	—	—	—	
"—" denotes a title that did not chart, or was not released in that territory.

=== Remix albums ===
Title	Album details
Hi Djinx! Django Django Remixed	Released: 17 December 2012; Label: Because Music; Formats: CD, LP, digital download

=== Singles ===
List of singles, with selected chart positions, showing year released and album name
Title	Year	Peak chart positions									Album
Title	Year	UK Sales	UK Indie	AUS	BEL	ICE	FRA	JPN	MEX	NED	Album
"Storm" / "Love's Dart"	2009	—	—	—	—	—	—	—	—	—	Django Django
"WOR"	2010	68	—	—	—	—	—	—	—	—	Django Django
"Waveforms"	2011	45	—	—	—	—	—	—	—	—	Django Django
"Default"	2012	49	42	100	22	—	—	97	—	71	Django Django
"Storm"	2012	12	—	—	— (Note: "Storm" did not enter the Flanders Ultratop 50, but peaked at 55 on the Flanders Ultratip chart.)	—	—	—	—	—	Django Django
"Hail Bop"	2012	—	—	—	— (Note: "Hail Bop" did not enter the Flanders Ultratop 50, but peaked at 84 on the Flanders Ultratip chart.)	—	—	—	49	—	Django Django
"Life's a Beach"	2012	25	—	—	—	—	—	—	43	—	Django Django
"Porpoise Song"	2014	49	—	—	—	—	—	—	—	—	Late Night Tales: Django Django
"First Light"	2015	7	45	—	— (Note: "First Light" did not enter the Flanders Ultratop 50, but peaked at 52 on the Flanders Ultratip chart.)	—	172	—	36	—	Born Under Saturn
"Beginning to Fade"	2015	42	—	—	—	—	—	—	—	—	Born Under Saturn
"Reflections"	2015	41	—	—	— (Note: "Reflections" did not enter the Flanders Ultratop 50, but peaked at 85 on the Flanders Ultratip chart.)	—	—	—	—	—	Born Under Saturn
"Shake and Tremble"	2015	11	—	—	—	—	—	—	40	—	Born Under Saturn
"Tic Tac Toe"	2017	17	—	—	—	—	—	—	—	—	Marble Skies
"Surface to Air" (featuring Self Esteem)	2018	7	—	—	— (Note: "Surface to Air" did not enter the Flanders Ultratop 50, but charted as an "extra tip" on the Flanders Ultratip chart.)	—	—	—	—	—	Marble Skies
"In Your Beat"	2018	56	—	—	—	—	—	—	44	—	Marble Skies
"Marble Skies"	2018	17	—	—	—	—	—	—	—	—	Marble Skies
"Spirals"	2020	27	—	—	—	—	—	—	—	—	Glowing in the Dark
"Glowing in the Dark"	2020	62	—	—	—	24	—	—	—	—	Glowing in the Dark
"Waking Up" (featuring Charlotte Gainsbourg)	2021	—	—	—	— (Note: "Waking Up" did not enter the Flanders Ultratop 50, but charted as an "extra tip" on the Flanders Ultratip chart.)	—	—	—	—	—	Glowing in the Dark
"—" denotes a recording that did not chart or was not released in that territory.

=== Other charting songs ===
Title	Year	Peak chart positions	Album
Title	Year	MEX	Album
"4000 Years"	2016	42	Born Under Saturn
