= Life in Color (disambiguation) =

Life in Color was an American company known for its eponymous concert tour series.

Life in Color or Life in Colour may refer to:

- Life in Color (film), 2015
- "Life in Color", song by OneRepublic from the album Native
- Life in Colour (album), by Andreya Triana
- Life in Colour (EP), by Nina Nesbitt
- Life in Colour (miniseries), 2021 nature documentary miniseries presented by David Attenborough

== See also ==
- Color (disambiguation)
