= Bajka (musician) =

German musician (born 1978)

- Born: Bajka Pluwatsch; 25 December 1978 (age 47)
- Genres: Downtempo, chillout

Bajka Pluwatsch (born 25 December 1978), also known by her mononym and stage name Bajka (pronounced "Bai-Kah"), is a German artist born in India and raised in Portugal and South Africa. She is a poet, singer, producer, and songwriter.

== History ==
Bajka studied music in Prague. Her relationship with Asia remains the main theme of her poetry. She has performed spoken word poetry on several projects, including Bonobo and Radio Citizen. In 2009 she performed on the Club des Belugas album "Zoo Zizaro". Her latest solo record is called Bajka in Wonderland, released on Chinchin records.

In recent years, her role has moved from poet to singer and composer as well as producer. Her voice is described as jazz/soul and she has appeared on a number of chill out and electronic dance tracks.

She is currently based in Berlin, Germany.

== Discography ==
- 1998 – Instinctive Traveler/Dissidenten (CD)
- 2005 – Dissidenten Remix.ed (2 CDs) (2000–2005)
- 2005 – Radio Citizen (7"&CD)
- 2005 – "The Only Religion That I Believe" (7")
- 2006 – "I Can No Poet Be" / "Love's Serenity" (12")
- 2010 – In Wonderland (CD) (2010)
- 2010 – Escape from Wonderland (CD remixes) (2010)
- 2011 – Bajka in Wonderland

== Appearances ==
- Beanfield – Human Patterns (November 1999) (1 track)
- Ben Mono – Dual (2003) (4 tracks)
- Beanfield – Seek (2004) (2 tracks)
- Das Goldene Zeitalter – A Vision / Breakin' Through / Im Würgegriff der schönen Künste (2006) (1 track)
- Radio Citizen – Berlin Serengeti (September 2006) (6 tracks)
- Bonobo – Days to Come (October 2006) (4 tracks)
- EastEnders – Beyond the Path (October 2007) (1 track)
- Aaron Jerome – Time to Rearrange (January 2008) (1 track)
- Protassov – Shalina Music (May 2008) (1 track)
- Mich Gerber – Wanderer (September 2008) (2 tracks)
- Una Mas Trio – Clear as Water (April 2009) (1 track)
- Sola Rosa – Get It Together (March 2009) (2 tracks)
- Ancient Astronauts – We Are to Answer (June 2009) (1 track)
- Chefket – Einerseits Andererseits (September 2009) (1 track)
- Argy – Upon Ourselves (2009) (1 track)
- Dalindèo – Soundtrack for the Sound Eye (January 2010) (2 tracks)*
- Radio Utopia – Algebra of Delight (2010) (3 tracks)
- Whitefield Brothers – Earthology (2010) (1 track)
- Radio Citizen – Hope and Despair (2010) (3 tracks)
- Pirupa – Trust (2011) (2 tracks, 3 remixes)
- The Soul Session – One (January 2012) (1 track)
- Bajka-Just the Truth – Just the Truth (February 2012) (2 tracks)
- Recollection-Rejoicer – (May 2013) (3 tracks)
- Hunter Game – The Island EP (July 2013) (1 track)
- LMNZ – Anders als die Besseren (August 2013) (1 track)
- Evolve – Deeper than the Sea (January 2014) (1 track)
- Long Lost Relative – Between Machines and Dreams (February 2014) (1 track)
- You and the Machines – Drift (February 2014) (1 track)
- Mark Romboy – Reciprocity (March 2014) (1 track)
- Kormac – Doorsteps (December 2014) (1 track)
- Hidden Jazz Quartett – Raw and Cooked (February 2016) (2 tracks)
