= Doveland (album) =

Studio album by Django Django
- Released: 6 November 2026
- Length: 42:08
- Label: Clouds Hill
- Producers: Bruno Ellingham; Polly Lapkovskaja; David Maclean; Nick McCarthy; Vincent Neff

Django Django chronology
Off Planet (2023)	Doveland (2026)

Doveland is the sixth studio album by the British art rock band Django Django. It was released on 6 November 2026 by Clouds Hill.

== Critical reception ==
Professional ratings
Aggregate scores
Source	Rating
AnyDecentMusic?	7.7/10
Metacritic	86/100
Review scores
Source	Rating
Clash	7/10
MusicOMH	4/5 stars
PopMatters	8/10
The Skinny	4/5 stars
Uncut	9/10

Doveland received a score of 86 out of 100 on review aggregator Metacritic based on five critics' reviews, indicating "universal acclaim". Uncut says the album "unfolds with an alchemical, 'White Album'-like sweep." Adam England of Clash admits, "It might not instantly grip you like some of their previous output, but it's quietly compelling in the way it gradually opens up, leaving a lasting impression." Joe Goggins of The Skinny calls Doveland "their most structurally traditionalist album."

Jeremy McDonagh of PopMatters says, "The record can feel like a very good snack: tasty, varied and satisfying in the moment, but capable of leaving you hungry again without quite knowing what you were hungry for." Oliver Evans of MusicOMH states, "There's never the sense that Doveland has boxed the band in, for their creativity is in evidence throughout."

== Track listing ==
All tracks are written by James Dixon, Thomas Grace, David Maclean, and Vincent Neff, except where noted.

Doveland track listing
No.	Title	Writer(s)	Length
1.	"Meteorite"		3:54
2.	"Cameos"		2:56
3.	"Still Life"	Dixon; Grace; D. Maclean; Neff; John Maclean	5:49
4.	"Little Me" (featuring Hak Baker)	Dixon; Grace; D. Maclean; Neff; Hak Baker; Polly Lapkovskaja	3:15
5.	"Year of the Snake"		4:10
6.	"Quicksand"		3:17
7.	"Left Adrift"		3:21
8.	"So Heavy"		4:26
9.	"Bird Song"		1:26
10.	"Indigo Road"		2:45
11.	"Dirty Hotel Blues"	Dixon; Grace; D. Maclean; Neff; J. Maclean	3:28
12.	"Feel Alright" (with Max Pope)	D. Maclean; Jack Kenworthy; Pope	3:21

== Personnel ==
These credits are adapted from Tidal.

=== Django Django ===
- Jimmy Dixon – vocals (tracks 1–5, 7, 8, 10, 11), guitar (1, 2, 7, 9–11), bass (3, 8)
- Tommy Grace – keyboards (1–3, 6–8, 10–12), guitar (8)
- David Maclean – production (all tracks), percussion (1–3, 5–9, 11), keyboards (1, 5), synthesizer (2), drums (12)
- Vincent Neff – vocals (1–5, 7, 8, 10, 11), guitar (2, 3, 10–12), bass (7, 11, 12), arrangement (10); production, vocal ensemble (12)

=== Additional contributors ===
- Jan Krause – mixing (all tracks), recording (1–3, 5–11)
- Ludwig Maier – mastering
- Polly Lapkovskaja – production (1–4, 6–10, 11), arrangement (1–4, 7, 8), keyboards (1, 3), bass (2), synthesizer (3), vocal ensemble (8)
- Nick McCarthy – production (1–4, 6–10, 11)
- Simon Popp – drums (1–3, 5–9, 11), percussion (12)
- Paranormal String Quartet – strings (1–3, 7)
- Max Pope – guitar (3, 12), vocal ensemble (12)
- Oscar Robertson – recording (4)
- Wolfi Schlick – flute (8), whistle (9)
- Bruno Ellingham – production, recording (12)
- Abimbola Amoaka-Gyampah – vocal ensemble (12)
- Sara Farell – vocal ensemble (12)

== Charts ==
Chart performance for Doveland
Chart (2026)	Peak position
Scottish Albums (Official Charts)	23
UK Independent Albums (Official Charts)	24
