= Lost Where I Belong =

Studio album by Andreya Triana
- Released: 6 September 2010
- Genre: R&B; soul
- Length: 37:24
- Label: Ninja Tune
- Producer: Simon Green

Andreya Triana chronology
Lost Where I Belong (2010)	Giants (2015)

Singles from Lost Where I Belong
- 1. "Lost Where I Belong" Released: 5 April 2010; 2. "A Town Called Obsolete" Released: 26 July 2010; 3. "Far Closer" Released: 7 February 2011

Professional ratings
Review scores
Source	Rating
AllMusic	4/5 stars
BBC	mixed
Exclaim!	favorable
Metro	3/5 stars
PopMatters	7/10 stars
Potholes in My Blog	4.5/5 stars
The Skinny	3/5 stars

Lost Where I Belong is the first studio album by British singer-songwriter Andreya Triana. It was released on Ninja Tune in 2010.

== Critical reception ==
Rick Anderson of AllMusic gave the album 4 stars out of 5, describing it as "a debut album of impressive beauty and maturity, one that documents a long musical and personal voyage fraught with heartbreak, but never succumbs to self-indulgent sentiment or confessional mawkishness." Euan Ferguson of The Skinny called it "a deeply soulful and promising debut."

Charles Aaron of Spin listed it as the best album of 2010.

== Track listing ==
All tracks are written by Andreya Triana and Simon Green, except where noted

No.	Title	Length
1.	"Draw the Stars"	3:59
2.	"Lost Where I Belong" (Andreya Triana, Simon Green, Fin Greenall)	5:13
3.	"A Town Called Obsolete"	3:05
4.	"Darker than Blue"	3:43
5.	"Daydreamers"	4:31
6.	"Far Closer" (Andreya Triana, Simon Green, Fin Greenall)	4:44
7.	"Something in the Silence"	3:26
8.	"Up in Fire"	4:03
9.	"X"	4:35
Total length:		37:24

Japanese edition bonus tracks
No.	Title	Length
10.	"Wonder When"	4:06
11.	"Lost Where I Belong (Flying Lotus Remix)" (Andreya Triana, Simon Green, Fin Greenall)	3:53
Total length:		45:24

== Personnel ==
Credits adapted from liner notes.

- Andreya Triana – vocals, percussion
- Simon Green – instruments
- Mikey Simmonds – strings
- Hannah Miller – cello
- Mike Lesirge – horns, flute
- Alan Hardiman – horns
- Ryan Jacob – horns
- Fin Greenall – guitar
- Jack Baker – drums

== Charts ==
Chart	Peak position
French Albums (SNEP)	187
