= Days to Come (album) =

Studio album by Bonobo
- Released: 2 October 2006
- Genre: Electronica; Nu jazz; trip hop; ambient
- Length: 51:05
- Label: Ninja Tune; ZENCD119; ZENCD119X

Bonobo chronology
It Came from the Sea (2005)	Days to Come (2006)	Black Sands (2010)

Professional ratings
Review scores
Source	Rating
Okayplayer	3.5/5 stars
Prefix Magazine	9.0/10 stars

Days to Come is the third studio album by British musician Bonobo. It was released on 2 October 2006 on the Ninja Tune independent record label.

It has been released in two versions – a standard 1-disc edition (ZENCD119) and a limited edition (ZENCD119X) with a second disc containing instrumental versions of the album's vocal tracks.

== Track listing ==
Tracks 1, 4, 5, 7, 8 and 11 are written and performed by Simon Green; others are credited as is.

No.	Title	Length
1.	"Intro"	0:54
2.	"Days to Come" (featuring Bajka)	3:50
3.	"Between the Lines" (featuring Bajka)	4:37
4.	"The Fever"	4:21
5.	"Ketto"	5:07
6.	"Nightlite" (featuring Bajka)	5:10
7.	"Transmission 94 (Parts 1 & 2)"	7:58
8.	"On Your Marks"	4:11
9.	"If You Stayed Over" (featuring Fink)	5:24
10.	"Walk in the Sky" (featuring Bajka)	4:35
11.	"Recurring"	5:07
Total length:		51:05

=== Limited edition bonus disc ===
No.	Title	Length
1.	"Days to Come (Instrumental)"	3:50
2.	"Between the Lines (Instrumental)"	4:36
3.	"Nightlite (Demo Version)"	5:11
4.	"If You Stayed Over (Instrumental)"	2:16
5.	"If You Stayed Over (Reprise)"	1:44
6.	"Walk in the Sky (Instrumental)"	4:06
7.	"Hatoa"	4:22

== Use in media ==
The track "Ketto" featured in Skins and was also used in the advertisement for the launch of the Citroën C4 Picasso in 2007. "Nightlite" appeared on UEFA Champions League 2006–2007, and "Recurring" was used in a surfing film broadcast on Fuel TV.

"Hatoa" uses samples from the Pentangle song "Light Flight".

"If You Stayed Over" is featured in the episode "The Economist" of "LOST".

== Awards ==
The album was voted Album of the Year in the 2006 Worldwide Awards on Gilles Peterson's BBC Radio 1 show.

In 2012 it was awarded a silver certification from the Independent Music Companies Association, which indicated sales of at least 20,000 copies throughout Europe.
