= It Came from the Sea =

Solid Steel Presents: It Came from the Sea

Compilation album by Bonobo
- Released: 3 October 2005
- Genre: Electronica
- Labels: Ninja Tune; ZENCD107

Bonobo chronology
Dial 'M' for Monkey (2003)	Solid Steel Presents: It Came from the Sea (2005)	Days to Come (2006)

Solid Steel chronology
DJ Kentaro: On the Wheels of Solid Steel (2005)	Bonobo: It Came from the Sea (2005)	DJ Food & DK: Now, Listen Again! (2007)

Professional ratings
Review scores
Source	Rating
Allmusic	3.5/5 stars

It Came from the Sea is a DJ mix album, mixed by Bonobo, released as part of the Solid Steel DJ mix series for Ninja Tune.

== Track listing ==
No.	Title	Artist	Length
1.	"Solid Steel Intro"	Bonobo	0:32
2.	"Sandcastles"	Diesler	1:46
3.	"Flutter"	Bonobo	1:37
4.	"Exploration"	The Karminsky Experience Inc.	3:06
5.	"Pick Up"	Bonobo	3:10
6.	"Hey Mr. Bundle"	Flevans	1:36
7.	"Score"	Black Grass	1:52
8.	"Les Fingres"	Solid Steel Players	2:40
9.	"Munchies' (I-Wolf Remix)" (Featuring DJ Collage)	Belgradeyard Sound System	3:45
10.	"Soul Call"	Paul Murphy	1:52
11.	"Hidden"	King Seven	3:31
12.	"Recurring"	Bonobo	4:52
13.	"Change Down / The Sugar Rhyme"	Bonobo	4:10
14.	"Marra Bossa"	Jazz Juice	4:20
15.	"Introduction"	Nat Adderley	1:01
16.	"I Know a Little Cuban"	Hugo Maldoro	3:52
17.	"Change Is What We Need"	Trouble Man	6:42
18.	"Easy Muffin"	Amon Tobin	4:31
19.	"Paths in Soft Focus"	Savath and Savalas	3:17
20.	"Otter's Pool"	Super Numeri	2:22
