= Marble Skies =

Studio album by Django Django
- Released: 26 January 2018
- Genres: Art rock; progressive rock
- Length: 40:40
- Label: Because Music

Django Django chronology
Born Under Saturn (2015)	Marble Skies (2018)	Glowing in the Dark (2021)

Marble Skies is the third studio album by British art rock band Django Django. It reached number 25 on the UK Albums Chart in January 2018.

== Reception ==
Professional ratings
Aggregate scores
Source	Rating
Metacritic	73/100
Review scores
Source	Rating
AllMusic	4/5 stars
DIY	4/5 stars
Drowned in Sound	6/10
Exclaim!	8/10
The Guardian	4/5 stars
Paste	7.8/10
Pitchfork	6.9/10
PopMatters	7/10 stars
Under the Radar	8/10 stars

Marble Skies received positive reviews from critics. On Metacritic, the album holds a score of 73/100 based on 20 reviews, indicating "generally favorable reviews" The Guardian awarded the "winningly eclectic" album four stars out of five, observing influences such as Kraftwerk, Gary Numan, OMD, Saint Etienne and the Beta Band.

== Track listing ==
No.	Title	Length
1.	"Marble Skies"	4:26
2.	"Surface to Air" (featuring Self Esteem)	3:41
3.	"Champagne"	4:43
4.	"Tic Tac Toe"	3:55
5.	"Further"	3:21
6.	"Sundials"	4:01
7.	"Beam Me Up"	3:52
8.	"In Your Beat"	3:49
9.	"Real Gone"	5:50
10.	"Fountains"	3:02

== Personnel ==
- Dave Maclean – Drums, percussion, samples
- Vincent Neff – Vocals, backing vocals, guitars
- Jim Nixon – Backing vocals, bass guitar
- Tommy Grace – Synthesizers, keyboards

== Charts ==
Chart performance for Marble Skies
Chart (2018)	Peak position
Belgian Albums (Ultratop Flanders)	95
Belgian Albums (Ultratop Wallonia)	112
Dutch Albums (Album Top 100)	120
French Albums (SNEP)	66
UK Albums (Official Charts)	20
US Top Dance Albums (Billboard)	9
