= Club des Belugas =

German Nu jazz band

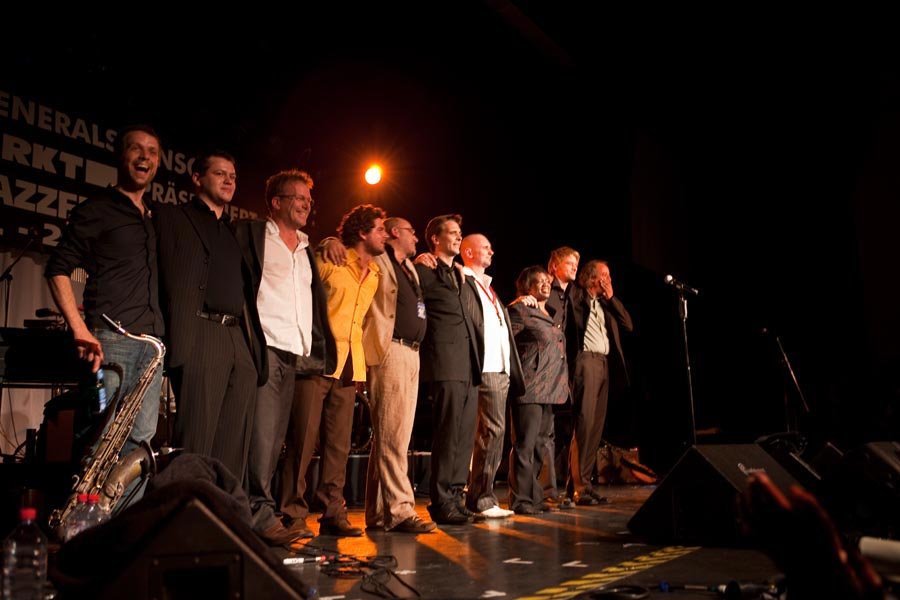
- Club des Belugas in 2009

Background information
- Origin: Wuppertal, North Rhine-Westphalia, Germany
- Years active: 2002–present
- Labels: Artcore Music; Chinchin Records; Glamjazz Records
- Website: www.club-des-belugas.com

Club des Belugas is a nu jazz and lounge group from Germany. The core of Club des Belugas consists of Maxim Illion and Kitty the Bill; they are supported by various featured and guest musicians including Reiner Winterschladen, Mickey Neher, Brenda Boykin and Ester Rada. In addition to acoustic instruments, synthesizers are often used. The music is influenced by jazz, soul, Latin, electro swing and lounge.

== History ==
The project was founded in 2002 in Wuppertal. The first album was released in the same year, Caviar at 3 a.m., followed by Minority Tunes in 2003. In 2006 the third album Apricoo Soul followed. It included a remix of the Dean Martin version of "Mambo Italiano", which was authorized by Capitol Records / EMI and Martin's family. Two years later, in 2008, SWOP was released, the following year Zoo Zizaro which includes their remix of Ella Fitzgerald's version of "Air Mail Special". In 2012 Forward was released with a single, "Save a Little Love for Me", featuring Ester Rada. In 2013 the album The ChinChin Sessions was released, which was created in collaboration with the Mannheim trumpeter Thomas Siffling.

Club des Belugas has released their albums Forward and The ChinChin Sessions (as of 2013) on the label Chinchin Records; previously they were under contract with Artcore Music.

Club des Belugas has given over 280 live concerts all over the world. Between June and September 2007, the band went on a concert tour through the People's Republic of China.

Recordings including "Hip Hip Chin Chin" and "Gadda Rio" (both on the album Minority Tunes) reached the top 10 on the German club charts in 2003. In total, pieces by the band were distributed on more than four million records, including not only CDs by the band themselves, but also on more than 1900 compilations.

Their music has been featured on TV shows including Live to Dance, So You Think You Can Dance (American TV series) and Dancing with the Stars (American season 7). Major companies have used their music in commercials.

== Band members ==
=== Main members ===
- Maxim Illion – Keyboard, Bass & Percussion
- Kitty the Bill – Keyboard

=== Featured and guest members ===
- Bajka
- Karlos Boes
- Brenda Boykin – Vocals
- Maya Fadeeva
- Anna Luca – Vocals
- Iain Mackenzie – Vocals
- Ferank Manseed
- Lene Riebau
- Anne Schnell – Vocals
- Thomas Siffling
- Ashley Slater

== Discography ==
Albums

- 2002 – Caviar at 3 a.m.
- 2003 – Minority tunes
- 2006 – Apricoo Soul
- 2008 – SWOP
- 2009 – Zoo Zizaro
- 2011 – Live
- 2012 – Forward
- 2014 – Fishing for Zebras
- 2016 – Nine
- 2018 – Club des Belugas & Thomas Siffling – Ragbag
- 2019 – Strange Things Beyond The Sunny Side
- 2021 – That's My Style
- 2021 – How to Avoid Difficult Situations

Singles

- 2007 – "Wildcats & Dibidy Dop"
- 2007 – "Hip Hip Chin Chin" (EP)
- 2012 – "Save a Little Love for Me"
- 2014 – "Straight to Memphis"
- 2014 – "Iko Iko" (feat. Brenda Boykin)
- 2016 – "It's Only Music" (feat. Ashley Slater)
- 2016 – "Hip Hip Chin Chin" (Schizoid Sista Remixes)
- 2016 – "Pogo Porn" (feat. Karlos Boes)
- 2016 – "Bye-Bye Baby I Won't Come Back"
- 2018 – "Double A"
- 2019 – "Don't Look Back"
- 2020 – "Get Get On"
- 2020 – "Mondo Mas"
- 2021 – "That's My Style" (feat. Maya Fadeeva)
- 2021 – "Scat"
- 2021 – "Mr. Rain"
- 2021 – "Coming a Little Bit Closer"
- 2021 – "Playing on the Radio"
