= Default (Django Django song) =

Single by Django Django

from the album Django Django
- Released: 16 January 2012
- Genre: Electronic rock, indie rock
- Length: 3:07
- Label: Because Music
- Songwriter(s): David Maclean, Vincent Neff

"Default" is a song by British rock band Django Django. The song was released on 16 January 2012.

== Music video ==
The music video for the song was released on 18 January 2012.

== Advertising ==
Part of the chorus was used to introduce a segment in the comedy series Russell Howard's Good News.

The song was used in an advert for Ford's Unlearn campaign in 2016.

The song can be heard in advertising for the ninth season of It's Always Sunny in Philadelphia.

The song was used in an advert for the Google Pixel phone.

== Chart performance ==
Chart performance for "Default"
| Chart (2013) | Peak position |
|---|---|
| Belgium (Ultratip Bubbling Under Flanders) | 22 |
