= Cirrus (song) =

Single by Bonobo

- CD cover art

Single by Bonobo

from the album The North Borders
- Released: 2013
- Genre: Instrumental
- Length: 5:49
- Label: Ninja Tune
- Songwriter(s): Bonobo
- Producer(s): Bonobo

Audio sample
- "Cirrus": file; help

"Cirrus" is a 2013 instrumental performed, written and produced by British musician, producer and DJ Bonobo. Released as the first single from his fifth studio album The North Borders, the song did not chart but in 2014 the song was featured in a Vodafone advert. The song premiered on Giles Peterson's BBC Radio 6 show on 19 January 2013. It was released on 1 April 2013 worldwide and on 2 April 2013 in North America.

== Composition ==
"Cirrus" was performed, written and produced by Bonobo. The song contains complicated drum patterns and live instrumentation.

== Release and reception ==
The song was released as the first single from his fifth studio album The North Borders. It premiered on Gilles Peterson's BBC Radio 6 show on 19 January 2013. The track was released on 1 April 2013 worldwide and on 2 April 2013 in North America. Although the song did not chart, the song was featured in a Vodafone advert in 2014. The song has also appeared in ads for Google's DevArt initiative and on AMC's Halt and Catch Fire

The song has been met with positive critical reception. A writer for Fact magazine called the track "a twinkling slice of fairy-light house", noting it to be "delicate" while also containing a "slightly steelier edge" that deviates from his style. Jason Grishkoff from Indie Shuffle found the song "pursuing the same sound" of his previous four albums, characterizing it as "absolutely perfect" for San Francisco rain. Phillip Yung of Earmilk stated the track "immediately" gives the listener "a spacey organic feel" and found the slide bass during the middle to give it "much anticipated weight", while Amy Heaton of Kaltblut magazine wrote the song was "the perfect soundtrack" to come out of hibernation to, calling it "one big loop of elation".

== Music video ==
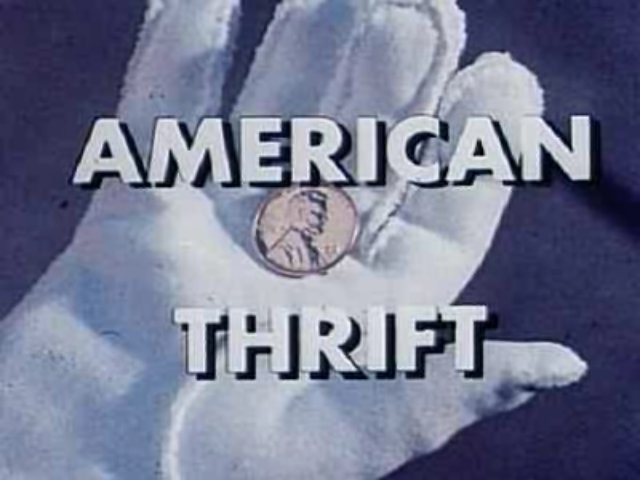
The music video manipulates footage from the 1962 film, American Thrift (opening title pictured).

A music video was created for the song by Cyriak on 24 January 2013. The video manipulates footage from American Thrift, a public domain film from 1962 depicting American consumerism. Cyriak borrowed inspiration from Zbigniew Rybczyński's film Tango, and obtained the film through the Prelinger Archives through the Internet Archive, calling it "a goldmine for us video artists." The video is 3:23 in length, and, as of June 2020, has been viewed over 15 million times on YouTube.

Critical reception for the video has been positive; Kimber Streams of The Verge called it "beautifully surreal", whereas Oli Kruscher of DropoutUK said that it "would slot smoothly into Monty Python's world [and] will take you on a mind-bending trip". Andrew Tarantola of Gizmodo reckoned it would be "what doing acid with the Beav would be like".

== Certifications ==
Region	Certification	Certified units/sales
United Kingdom (BPI)	Silver	200,000^{‡}
^{‡} Sales+streaming figures based on certification alone.
