= One Offs... Remixes & B-Sides =

Compilation album by Bonobo
- Released: 12 August 2002
- Genre: Electronica
- Label: Tru Thoughts; TRUCD031

Bonobo chronology
Animal Magic (2000)	One Offs... Remixes & B-Sides (2002)	Dial 'M' for Monkey (2003)

Professional ratings
Review scores
Source	Rating
Allmusic	3/5 stars

One Offs... Remixes & B-Sides is a compilation album released in 2002 by the British electronic music artist Bonobo. It features rare and previously unreleased work, and remixes of tracks from his first album Animal Magic. The album was released in 2002 on the Tru Thoughts label. The song "Scuba" appears in the racing game Need for Speed: Undercover.

== Track listing ==
The tracks 4, 6, 7, 10, and 11 are written and performed by Bonobo; others are credited as is.

No.	Title	Artist	Length
1.	"Turtle (Bonobo Mix)"	Pilote	5:06
2.	"Beachy Head (Bonobo Mix)"	Mechanical Me	3:45
3.	"The Plug (Quantic Mix)"	Bonobo	6:11
4.	"Dismantling Frank"	Bonobo	5:06
5.	"Dinosaurs (Jon Kennedy Mix)"	Bonobo	4:05
6.	"The Sicilian"	Bonobo	4:21
7.	"The Shark"	Bonobo	4:54
8.	"Four Ton Mantis (Bonobo Mix)"	Amon Tobin	4:12
9.	"Tell Me How You Feel (Bonobo Mix)"	Jon Kennedy	5:02
10.	"Magicman"	Bonobo	4:35
11.	"Scuba"	Bonobo	4:21
