= Live Sessions (Bonobo EP) =

EP by Bonobo
- Released: 27 June 2005
- Genre: Electronica
- Length: 32:38
- Label: Ninja Tune; NJT12170; ZENCDS170

Bonobo chronology
The Shark EP 12" (2001)	Live Sessions (2005)

Professional ratings
Review scores
Source	Rating
Allmusic	3/5 stars

Live Sessions is an extended play by Bonobo. Four Bonobo classics ("Noctuary", "Dismantling Frank", "The Plug", and "Nothing Owed") have been taken out of the laptop/sampler and reconstructed with live bass, drums, saxophone, keys, cello, guitars and electronics. "Recurring" is a brand new studio track recorded on the fly in this session. The extended play is rounded out by Four Tet's remix of "Pick Up".

== Track listing ==
No.	Title	Length
1.	"Noctuary"	4:34
2.	"Dismantling Frank"	4:05
3.	"The Plug"	6:09
4.	"Nothing Owed"	6:24
5.	"Recurring"	5:03
6.	"Pick Up (Four Tet Mix Edit)"	6:23

== Personnel ==
All songs written by Simon Green.

- Simon Green – bass
- Simon Janes – cello, guitar
- Jack Baker – drums
- James De Malplaquet – effects (electronics), percussion, vocals
- Simon Little – keyboards
- Ben Cooke – saxophone
- Ryan Morey – mastering
- Stephen Hodge – mixing, engineer
- Suzi Green – project manager

== Sources ==
- Press Release from the official Bonobo website.
