= Glowing in the Dark =

Studio album by Django Django
- Released: 12 February 2021
- Genre: Electronic rock; neo-psychedelia
- Length: 43:55
- Label: Because
- Producer: Django Django

Django Django chronology
Marble Skies (2018)	Glowing in the Dark (2021)	Off Planet (2023)

Professional ratings
Aggregate scores
Source	Rating
AnyDecentMusic?	7.8/10
Metacritic	79/100
Review scores
Source	Rating
AllMusic	3.5/5 stars
Beats Per Minute	72%
Clash	8/10
DIY	4/5 stars
The Line of Best Fit	6/10
MusicOMH	4/5 stars
NME	4/5 stars
Pitchfork	7.1/10
PopMatters	9/10
The Skinny	4/5 stars

Glowing in the Dark is the fourth studio album by British band Django Django. It was released on 12 February 2021 by Because Music.

== Release ==
On 12 November 2020, Django Django revealed they were releasing their fourth studio album. The album features collaborations by Charlotte Gainsbourg and Braulio Amadio.

=== Singles ===
Django Django released the first single from the album, "Spirals" on 26 June 2010 to 10 September 2020. The accompanied music video, directed by Maxim Kelly, is described as a "psychedelic trip". Kelly said in a statement of the video: "The approach behind "Spirals" by Django Django was to translate the psychedelic trip through The Victorian technique of the phenakistiscope. The visual illusion generated by spinning the disks at the correct speed coupled with the shutter of a camera is both confusing and hypnotic. I was drawn to how the animations flow in and out, drifting and duping the mind and then back again. This felt a lot like the psychedelic experience tome. The challenge was to fuse the old with the modern. The analogue and the digital. Updating and modernizing the technique." On 14 October 2020, the band released a remix version of the single by American band MGMT.

On 9 October 2020, the band released "The Ark", a B-side instrumental track to "Spirals".

The band released the title track "Glowing in the Dark" on the same day as the album announcement. Artist and illustrator Braulio Amadio appears in the music video, explaining "I didn't want to be literal and do something glowing in the dark, so in my head the video is somewhat an abstract representation of the song title without being too obvious. I wanted it to feel organic, I wanted to feel trippy, vibrant and colourful."

On 21 January 2021, the fourth single "Free From Gravity" was released. The music video, directed by Jim Canty and shot in Mystic, Connecticut, follows a small child dressed in a green alien costume wandering around town. Lead vocalist Dave Maclean said in a statement: "The idea for the video came to me one evening in lock down. I've been heavily into sci-fi and the whole extra terrestrial thing since I was a kid reading books about the unexplained. It's about someone who feels alienated in life and that idea is taken to the extreme where they're actually feeling alienated because they don't belong on this planet."

== Critical reception ==
Glowing in the Dark was met with "generally favorable" reviews from critics. At Metacritic, which assigns a weighted average rating out of 100 to reviews from mainstream publications, this release received an average score of 79 based on 15 reviews. AnyDecentMusic? gave the release a 7.8 out of 10 based on a critical consensus of 21 reviews.

In a review for AllMusic, Timothy Monger wrote: "Django Django's arrangements are rarely simple and for the most part, this holds true on Glowing in the Dark, but there is a kind of immediacy and uplift to a number of the songs, particularly the shimmering opener "Spirals" and the bouncy pop of "Free from Gravity". As a whole, Glowing in the Dark is a mostly solid, well-built album with enough standouts to keep it fresh without venturing too far out of the group's wheelhouse." John Wohlmacher of Beats Per Minute stated: "Somewhat of a return to form, the album sounds like warm summer nights and white wine, 90s videogames and 00s Beck; there’s a lot here that contradicts the still-ongoing mood of lockdown fatigue." Nick Roseblade of Clash explained: "While Glowing In The Dark isn't their strongest album to date is it their most accomplished. The wonky fun of their debut has been replaced with slick productions and the songs just sound amazing for it. This is in part down to their production. Everything sounds sharp and clear. At times, the melodies are beyond catchy." Sean Kerwick of DIY gave the release a four out of five stars, noting "Glowing In The Dark embraces a more rustic approach favouring dusty synths and guitar over the glossy sheen of predecessor Marble Skies. Whether the group's sound prevails or begins to show its limitations remains to be seen, but when the songwriting and appetite for invention remains this strong, Django Django certainly have a lot more to give."

== Commercial performance ==
In the UK, Glowing in the Dark debuted at number 68 on the UK Albums Chart for the week of 25 February 2021. It also appeared at number 7 on the Scottish Albums.

== Track listing ==
All tracks are written by Django Django.

Glowing in the Dark track listing
No.	Title	Length
1.	"Spirals"	5:00
2.	"Right the Wrongs"	2:08
3.	"Got Me Worried"	3:36
4.	"Waking Up"	3:18
5.	"Free From Gravity"	2:54
6.	"Headrush"	3:58
7.	"The Ark"	2:45
8.	"Night of the Buffalo"	3:55
9.	"The World Will Turn"	1:53
10.	"Kick the Devil Out"	3:19
11.	"Glowing in the Dark"	2:59
12.	"Hold Fast"	4:47
13.	"Asking for More"	3:23

== Personnel ==
Django Django

- David MacLean – performance, production, mixing, design
- Vincent Neff – performance, production, design
- Tommy Grace – performance, production, design
- Jimmy Dixon – performance, production, design

Additional contributors

- Matt Colton – mastering
- Alexis Smith – mixing
- Oran Wishart – cover painting
- Horacio Bolz – photography
- Ife Tolentino – additional guitar on "Got Me Worried"
- Antonio de Freitas – cuíca and tambourine on "Got Me Worried"
- Charlotte Gainsbourg – vocals on "Waking Up"
- Bridget Samuels – string arrangement on "Free From Gravity"
- Orchestrate (Note: Orchestrate consists of Eloisa Thom, Guy Button, Paloma Deike, Alicia Berendese, Jenny Lewisohn, Alison D'Souza, Kieran Carter, Sergio Serra, and Toby Hughes.) – strings on "Free From Gravity"
- Raven Bush – strings on "Night of the Buffalo" and "The World Will turn"
- Ashana Davidson – backing vocals on "Kick the Devil Out"

== Charts ==
Chart performance for Glowing in the Dark
Chart (2021)	Peak position
Scottish Albums (OCC)	7
UK Albums (OCC)	68
UK Independent Albums (OCC)	4
