= Life in Colour (album) =

2019 album by Andreya Triana

Studio album by Andreya Triana
- Released: 24 May 2019
- Studio: Various: Baggpipe Studios (Stockholm, Sweden); Ladbroke Grove (London, England); Spark Studios (London, England); Ten87 Studios (London, England); Adapted from Life in Colour liner notes
- Length: 34:09
- Label: Hi-Tea
- Producer: Dimitri Tikovoï; Troy Miller; Johan Rohr; Lloyd Hinshelwood; Dee Adam; Bastian Langebaek

Andreya Triana chronology
Giants (2015)	Life in Colour (2019)

Singles from Life in Colour
- 1. "Woman" Released: 20 November 2018; 2. "Broke" Released: 11 January 2019; 3. "Freedom" Released: 8 April 2019

Life in Colour is the third studio album by English singer-songwriter Andreya Triana. The album was released on 24 May 2019 by Hi-Tea Records. It is Triana's first album release in four years, following her previous album Giants (2015). The album created three singles: "Woman", "Broke" and "Freedom". Triana collaborated with multiple producers for Life in Colour, notably French musician Dimitri Tikovoï who produced the majority of the album.

== Track listing ==
No.	Title	Writer(s)	Producer(s)	Length
1.	"Woman"	Andreya Triana; Dee Adam; Dimitri Tikovoï	Tikovoï	3:07
2.	"I Give You My Heart"	Triana; Adam; Tikovoï	Tikovoï	3:02
3.	"Broke"	Triana; Adam; Carl Ryden	Tikovoï	2:38
4.	"Freedom"	Triana; Adam; Tikovoï	Tikovoï	2:35
5.	"How Deep My Love Goes"	Triana; Emelie Eriksson; Johan Rohr	Troy Miller; Rohr	3:56
6.	"Do That for You"	Triana; Adam; Aram Zarikian	Lloyd Hinshelwood; Adam	3:23
7.	"Beautiful People"	Triana; Adam; Tikovoï	Tikovoï	3:35
8.	"Dance the Pain Away"	Triana; Adam; Bastian Langebaek; Jordan Thomas	Langebaek	2:29
9.	"Something Real"	Triana; Langebaek	Langebaek	2:48
10.	"I'm Already Home"	Triana; Adam; Nicolas Rebscher	Tikovoï	3:52
11.	"It's Gonne Be Alright"	Triana; Anna Krantz	Triana	2:44
Total length:				34:09
