= Animal Magic (Bonobo album) =

Studio album by Bonobo
- Released: 24 July 2000 (original); 24 April 2001 (re-release)
- Genres: Trip hop; electronica; chill-out; ambient; world
- Length: 44:31
- Labels: Tru Thoughts (TRU CD 007) (TRU LP 007); Ninja Tune (ZENCD 063)

Bonobo chronology
Animal Magic (2000)	One Offs... Remixes & B-Sides (2002)

Animal Magic is the debut studio album by British electronic musician Bonobo. It was released in 2000 on Tru Thoughts and re-released in 2001 by Ninja Tune.

== Critical reception ==
Professional ratings
Review scores
Source	Rating
AllMusic	2.5/5 stars
Pitchfork	7.6/10
Sputnikmusic	4.5/5 stars

AllMusic gave the album 2.5 stars out of 5, stating that it "slowly builds its way into a steady and enjoyable debut". Pitchfork gave the album a score of 7.6/10, praising Bonobo (a.k.a. Simon Green) "for his smooth and calming sound, but detrimental use of previous Ninja Tune and Tru Thoughts records".

== Track listing ==
All songs were mixed by Bonobo (Simon Green).

No.	Title	Length
1.	"Intro"	0:43
2.	"Sleepy Seven"	5:19
3.	"Dinosaurs"	3:57
4.	"Kota"	5:41
5.	"Terrapin"	4:36
6.	"The Plug"	5:15
7.	"Shadowtricks"	4:06
8.	"Gypsy"	3:35
9.	"Sugar Rhyme"	4:44
10.	"Silver"	6:36
Total length:		44:31
