= Bonobo (musician) =

English musician, producer, and DJ (born 1976)

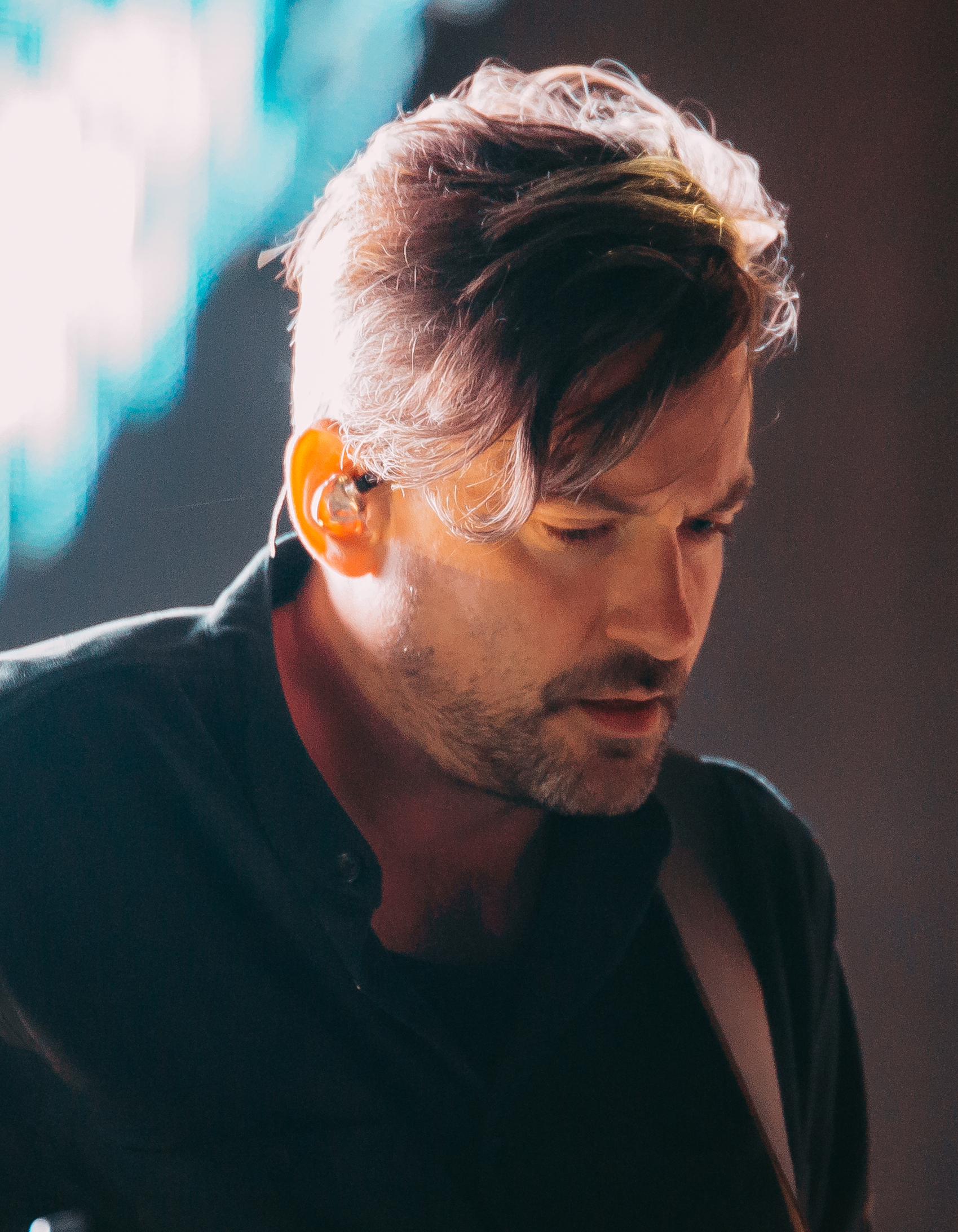
- Bonobo in 2017

Background information
- Also known as: Barakas
- Born: Simon Charles Green; 30 March 1976 (age 50)
- Origin: Brighton, England
- Genres: Electronica; downtempo; nu jazz; trip hop; world music
- Years active: 1999–present
- Labels: Ninja Tune, Tru Thoughts
- Member of: Nirobi and Barakas
- Website: Official website

Simon Charles Green (born 30 March 1976), known by his stage name Bonobo, is an English musician, producer, and DJ based in Los Angeles. He debuted with a trip hop aesthetic and has since explored more upbeat approaches as well as jazz and world music influences. His electronic sound incorporates the use of organic instrumentation and is recreated by a full band in live performances.

== Career ==
=== 1999–2009 ===
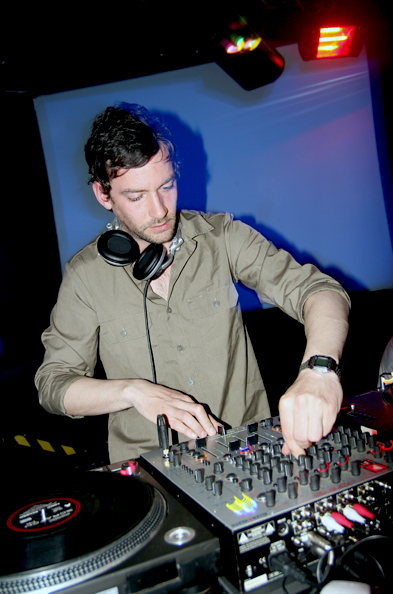
Bonobo in 2007

Green debuted in 1999 on the Tru Thoughts compilation When Shapes Join Together. His stage name Bonobo is a reference to the great ape species. Following the release of the EP Scuba, on the Brighton-based label Fly Casual Recordings, and the single "Terrapin", Bonobo was offered label deals with XL Recordings and Mute Records, but he chose to remain with Tru Thoughts.

His first album, Animal Magic, was published on the same label in 2000, to mixed reviews. Paul Cooper of Pitchfork stated that it "breaks no new ground for chill-out", while PopMatters said Bonobo "[showcases] smooth breakbeat loops, synth sounds, and aforementioned dub effects. [And his] electronic music draws on live playing." Reviewer Dean Carlson also said that the album "slowly takes shape as a solid debut of narcoleptic downtempo". In spite of these reactions, Animal Magic has gained Bonobo a cult following. Its accompanying compilation album, titled One Offs..., was issued in 2002 and contains reworked songs and rarities.

In 2001, Bonobo was signed to Coldcut's label Ninja Tune, and in 2003, he released Dial 'M' for Monkey. John Bush of AllMusic stated in a review that Bonobo's influences were drawn more towards alternative rock and world music rather than hip-hop or trip hop. The album tracks "Pick up" and "Flutter" were featured in the snowboarding game SSX on Tour.

In 2005, Bonobo contributed to the Solid Steel series with It Came from the Sea. The mix features several exclusive tracks as well as remixes and re-edits. His third album, entitled Days to Come, was released on 2 October 2006. An AllMusic review states that "[Bonobo] breathes new life into a well-worn genre." With the album as well as his future work, he featured vocalists such as Bajka, thus "adding [an] organic and vibrant musicality that's rare in electronic music." Days to Come was voted Best Album of 2006 by Gilles Peterson's listeners. The song "Nightlite" appeared on UEFA Champions League 2006–2007, and "Recurring" was used in a surfing film broadcast on Fuel TV.

=== 2010–2015 ===
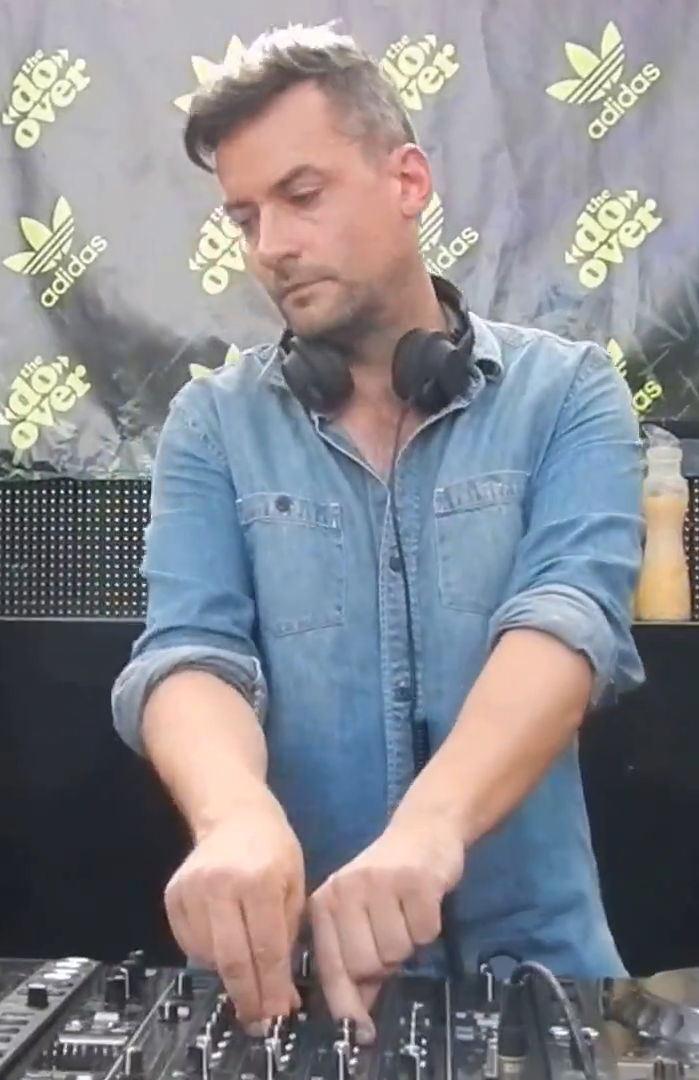
Bonobo in 2013

The song "The Keeper", featuring vocals by Andreya Triana, was issued in September 2009 as the lead single from Bonobo's fourth album, Black Sands, released in March 2010. A BBC review by Paul Clarke stated that "Green has progressed from predominantly sample-based production to more live instrumentation [and] has become equally adept at mastering [...] multi-layered atmospheres." In the same review, Clarke also commented that the song "We Could Forever" "saddles an Afro-inflected guitar and skittish flute to deep sub-bass" and "Kiara" combines "oriental strings with cut-up beats". After their collaboration for Black Sands, Green produced Triana's debut album, Lost Where I Belong. The Bonobo song "Kong" was used during a scene in an artist's studio in the eighth episode of the second season of House of Cards.

In February 2012, Black Sands Remixed was released on Ninja Tune, featuring tracks from the original Black Sands record remixed by electronic producers such as Machinedrum, Lapalux, Floating Points, and Mark Pritchard.

The first single off the next Bonobo album, "Cirrus", was given its worldwide debut on Gilles Peterson's BBC Radio 6 program on 19 January 2013. The album, titled The North Borders, was set for release on 1 April 2013 but came out early in its digital format after a promotional copy was leaked prior to the planned launch date. The North Borders marked Bonobo's first UK and US album chart entries, where they respectively reached numbers 34 and 122. "Cirrus" was featured as the closing song of the pilot episode for the AMC show Halt and Catch Fire.

Bonobo produced the song "Pulls" by DELS for his 2014 album, Petals Have Fallen, which was released under Big Dada—a sister label of Ninja Tune.

=== 2016–present ===
Bonobo released his sixth album, Migration, in January 2017. In an interview with Billboard, he stated that he conceived the album from "living and being in various locations", as he toured extensively and did not "have a home base for about a year". The album and the track "Bambro Koyo Ganda" were nominated at the 2018 Grammy Awards for Best Dance/Electronic Album and Best Dance Recording, respectively. The record peaked at number 5 on the UK chart and 59 in the US. In 2018, it won Album of the Year at the Electronic Music Awards, and the artist was nominated for Live Act of the Year.

On 1 July 2019, Bonobo released a new song, "Linked", online. The track was later nominated for Best Dance Recording at the 62nd Grammy Awards but lost to "Got to Keep On" by the Chemical Brothers.

The following year, Bonobo remixed Michael Kiwanuka's song "Final Days".

Bonobo's seventh studio album, Fragments, was released on 14 January 2022, with five singles issued ahead of its release. The first one, "Rosewood", debuted on 6 October 2021, followed by "Tides"—a collaboration with Jamila Woods—on 20 October. "Otomo"—a collaboration with O'Flynn—came out on 10 November, followed by "Shadows", with Jordan Rakei, on 1 December. The fifth and final single, "From You", with Joji, was released on 3 January 2022.

Bonobo was nominated for the Brit Award for British Dance Act in 2023.

Bonobo, along with Kamasi Washington and Floating Points, composed music for the 2025 Japanese anime television series Lazarus, directed by Shinichirō Watanabe. In 2026, all three collectively won Best Original Score for Animation at the Music Awards Japan.

In June 2026, it was announced that Bonobo would release his eighth studio album, Distance in Static, in September. To support, Bonobo will tour North America in November and early December 2026.

== Musical style ==
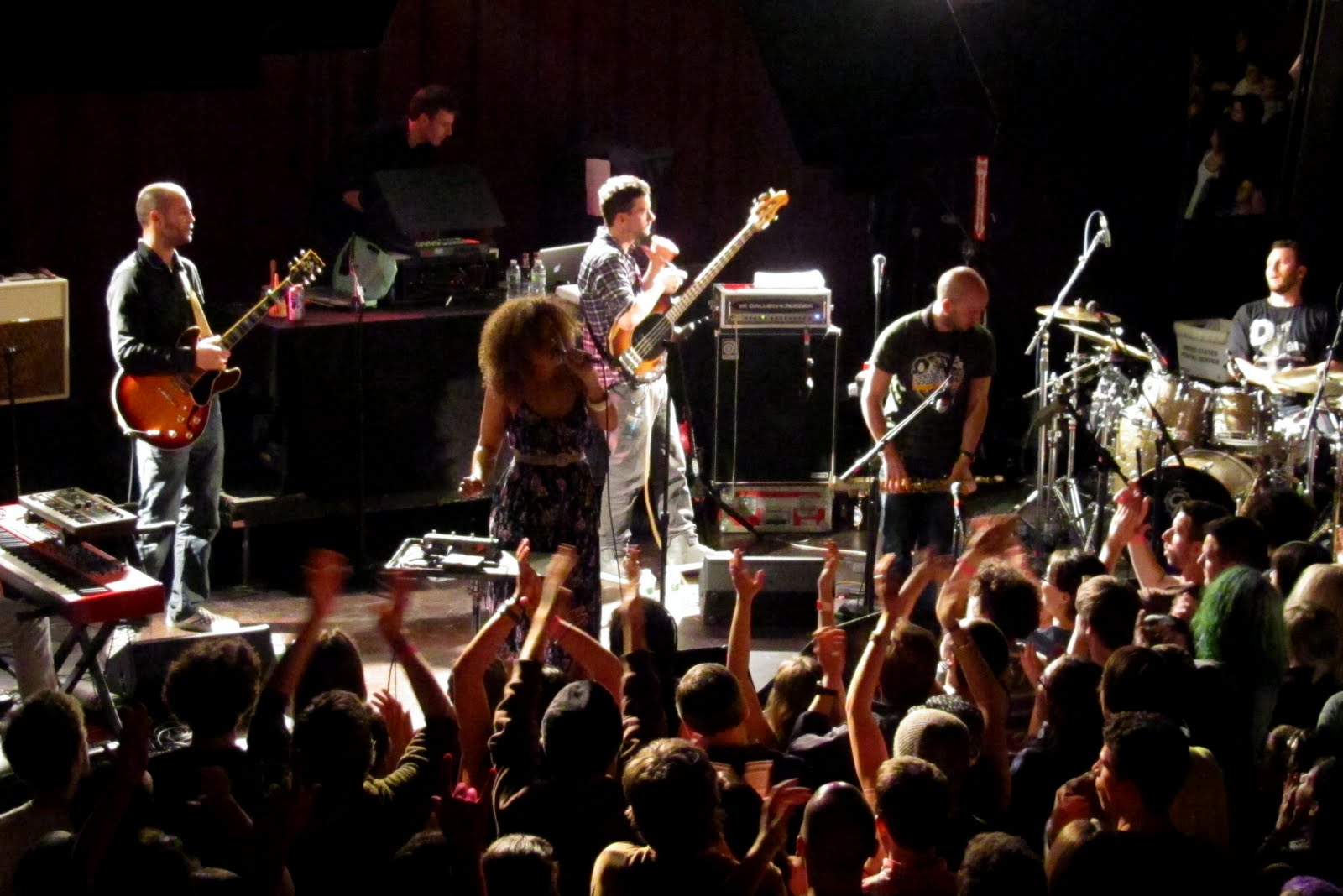
Bonobo performing in a live band with Andreya Triana in April 2010

Bonobo's sound is oriented on beats and samples but typically "soothing", combining influences ranging from club to world music. Pitchfork named him a key figure in the 2000s downtempo electronica scene, while The Guardian associated him with the recent popularity of "ambient world electronica". While his earliest work was firmly based in trip hop, his style soon became more upbeat and delved into genres such as jazz (which has led him to be described as a nu jazz artist) and traditional Indian music. He has collaborated with various artists, including Bajka, Andreya Triana, Erykah Badu, and Rhye, who have contributed vocals to songs on several of his albums.

Green has also performed with Robert Luis of the Tru Thoughts label under the aliases Nirobi and Barakas.

Whilst often touring solo and performing DJ sets and residencies, in 2010, Bonobo opted to start touring with a full band for the Black Sands tour. The group plays live renditions of studio material, with a singer, keyboardist, guitarist, saxophonist, string section, electronics, and drummer, often with improvisations and solos.

== Discography ==
Bonobo discography
- Studio albums: 8
- Extended plays: 11
- Live albums: 2
- Singles: 27
- Remix albums: 2
- Other albums: 3

=== Albums ===
Title	Details	Peak chart positions									Certifications
Title	Details	UK	AUS	BEL (Fl)	BEL (Wa)	FRA	GER	NED	SWI	US	Certifications
Animal Magic	Released: 25 July 2000; Label: Tru Thoughts, Ninja Tune (2001 re-release)	—	—	—	—	—	—	—	—	—	
Dial 'M' for Monkey	Released: 9 June 2003; Label: Ninja Tune	—	—	—	—	—	—	—	—	—	
Days to Come	Released: 2 October 2006; Label: Ninja Tune	—	—	—	—	—	—	—	—	—	
Black Sands	Released: 29 March 2010; Label: Ninja Tune	—	—	—	—	105	—	—	—	—	BPI: Gold
The North Borders	Released: 21 March 2013; Label: Ninja Tune	34	—	51	119	54	72	52	39	122	BPI: Silver
Migration	Released: 13 January 2017; Label: Ninja Tune	5	12	6	20	35	11	10	5	59	BPI: Silver
Fragments	Released: 14 January 2022; Label: Ninja Tune	5	6	11	10	59	3	9	8	—	
Distance in Static	Released: 11 September 2026; Label: Ninja Tune	11	22	17	23	124	8	35	11	—	
"—" denotes a recording that did not chart or was not released.

=== EPs ===
- Scuba (2000)
- Terrapin (2000)
- Silver (2000)
- The Shark (2000)
- Kota (2002)
- Pick Up (2003)
- Flutter (2003)
- The Keeper (featuring Andreya Triana) (2009)
- Ten Tigers (2014)
- The Flashlight (2014)
- Bambro Koyo Ganda (2017)

=== Live albums ===
- Live Sessions (2005)
- The North Borders Tour – Live (2014)

=== Remix albums ===
- One Offs... Remixes & B-Sides (2002)
- Black Sands Remixed (2012)

=== Other albums ===
- Sweetness (2002)
- Solid Steel Presents: It Came from the Sea (2005)
- Late Night Tales: Bonobo (2013)
- fabric presents: Bonobo (2019)
- Lazarus (Adult Swim Original Series Soundtrack) (2025)

=== Singles ===
- "Nightlite" / "If You Stayed Over" (2006)
- "Nightlite" (Zero dB Reconstruction/Bonobo Remixes) (2006)
- "Stay the Same" (featuring Andreya Triana) (2009)
- "Eyesdown" (featuring Andreya Triana) (2010)
- "Cirrus" (2013)
- "First Fires" (featuring Grey Reverend) (2013)
- "Ibrik" (2019)
- "Linked" (2019)
- "Heartbreak" (with Totally Enormous Extinct Dinosaurs) (2020)
- "Loom" (with Ólafur Arnalds) (2020)
- "6000 Ft." (with Totally Enormous Extinct Dinosaurs) (2020)
- "Rosewood" (2021)
- "Tides" (featuring Jamila Woods) (2021)
- "Otomo" (featuring O'Flynn) (2021)
- "Shadows" (featuring Jordan Rakei) (2021)
- "From You" (featuring Joji) (2022)
- "ATK" (2022)
- "Defender" (2022)
- "Fold" (with Jacques Greene) (2023)
- "Dark Will Fall" (from Lazarus soundtrack) (feat. Jacob Lusk) (2025)
- "Falling" (2025)
- "Me and You" (2026)
- "Fire on the Water" (featuring Arooj Aftab) / "Drift" (2026)

=== DVDs ===
- Live at Koko (2009)
- The North Borders Tour – Live (2014)

== See also ==
- List of ambient music artists
