= Django Django (album) =

Studio album by Django Django
- Released: 30 January 2012
- Recorded: 2011
- Genres: Art rock; neo-psychedelia; electronic rock; experimental pop
- Length: 48:30
- Label: Because Music
- Producer: Django Django

Django Django chronology
Django Django (2012)	Born Under Saturn (2015)

Django Django is the debut album by British art rock band Django Django. The album was released on 30 January 2012 in the United Kingdom via Because Music, and charted on the UK Albums Chart at number 33. In 2014, it was awarded a gold certification from the Independent Music Companies Association, which indicated sales of at least 75,000 copies throughout Europe.

The album was nominated for the 2012 Mercury Music Prize. It was certified gold by the UPFI in 2012, and then platinum in 2013.

== Critical reception ==
Professional ratings
Aggregate scores
Source	Rating
AnyDecentMusic?	7.7/10
Metacritic	80/100
Review scores
Source	Rating
AllMusic	4/5 stars
The Guardian	5/5 stars
The Irish Times	4/5 stars
Mojo	4/5 stars
NME	8/10
The Observer	3/5 stars
Pitchfork	7.2/10
Q	4/5 stars
Rolling Stone	3.5/5 stars
Uncut	4/5 stars

Django Django holds a score of 80 out of 100 on review aggregate site Metacritic, indicating "generally favourable reviews". The Guardian reviewer Michael Hann praised the album's "top-notch" song writing and "updated psychedelia that beguiles and delights", concluding that "surely this debut won't be topped in 2012".

The track "Wor" was used in a Toyota Australia advertisement for the 2019 Toyota CH-R Next Gen Turbo.

"Hail Bop" was featured in the football video game by EA Sports, FIFA 13, and "Waveforms" was featured in the action-adventure video game by Rockstar Games, Grand Theft Auto V, on the "Worldwide FM" radio station.

The album was listed at number 26 on Rolling Stone's list of the top 50 albums of 2012, with the magazine writing: "Drummer-producer David Maclean is the MVP, building trippy tracks around indelible grooves."

The album was also included in the book 1001 Albums You Must Hear Before You Die.

== Track listing ==
No.	Title	Length
1.	"Introduction"	2:12
2.	"Hail Bop"	4:03
3.	"Default"	3:05
4.	"Firewater"	4:49
5.	"Waveforms"	4:26
6.	"Zumm Zumm"	5:19
7.	"Hand of Man"	2:36
8.	"Love's Dart"	3:49
9.	"Wor"	4:31
10.	"Storm"	3:14
11.	"Life's a Beach"	3:05
12.	"Skies Over Cairo"	3:32
13.	"Silver Rays"	3:50

== Personnel ==
- Vincent Neff – lead vocals, guitars
- Jim Nixon – bass guitar, backing vocals, keyboards
- Tommy Grace – keyboards, backing vocals, drum programming, samples
- Dave Maclean – drums, percussion, drum programming

== Hi Djinx! Django Django Remixed ==
Hi Djinx! Django Django Remixed is a remix album with the same exact track listing as Django Django excluding the introduction. It was given away for free with purchase of the original album in certain stores as well as being sold as a download and CD. Remixers include Tom Furse, Adrian Sherwood, and Steve Mason.

== Charts ==
Chart performance for Django Django
Chart (2012)	Peak position
Australian Albums (ARIA)	60
Belgian Albums (Ultratop Flanders)	26
Belgian Albums (Ultratop Wallonia)	105
Dutch Albums (Album Top 100)	43
French Albums (SNEP)	68
Irish Albums (IRMA)	63
Scottish Albums (Official Charts)	26
UK Albums (Official Charts)	33
US Heatseekers Albums (Billboard)	13

== Certifications ==
Certifications for Django Django
Region	Certification	Certified units/sales
United Kingdom (BPI)	Silver	69,562
