= Colleen Coble =

American novelist

- Born: January 19, 1952 (age 74); Wabash, Indiana, U.S.
- Occupation: Novelist
- Writing career
- Genres: Romance, historical fiction
- Website: www.colleencoble.com

Colleen Coble (born January 19, 1952) is an American Christian author of romance, romantic suspense and historical fiction. Her novels and novellas have sold a total of about 6 million copies, and have received numerous awards, including the Romance Writers of America prestigious RITA, the Holt Medallion, the ACFW Book of the Year, the Daphne du Maurier, National Readers’ Choice, the Booksellers Best, and the 2009 Best Books of Indiana-Fiction award.

She was born January 19, 1952, in Wabash, Indiana. She was raised on a farm in Wabash County, Indiana, the eldest of four children. Her father, George Rhoads, was a farmer who also worked as a guard at General Motors. Her mother, Peggy Rhoads, was a housewife. She has three brothers: Randy (who died in 1990), Rick, and David. She graduated from Southwood High School, in Wabash County.

Coble's early books were short historical romances published by Barbour Publishing under its Heartsong Presents imprint. The first four novels were set in Wyoming. Coble says she was inspired to write them when her brother Randy was killed by lightning on August 28, 1990. After a visit to Wyoming, where he had lived, she was inspired to do what she'd longed to do for several years: actually write a book. Wyoming became the setting for her first four romance novels, set in the wild West of the 1860s: Where Leads the Heart, Plains of Promise, The Heart Answers, and To Love a Stranger. It took her a year to write the first one because she continued to work at her full-time job as a receptionist at Wabash Electric Supply, where she answered about 1000 phone calls a day.

Coble says, "Born and raised in the Midwest (Indiana), I grew up on a farm with horses, pigs and chickens. I had plenty of adventure–from being dragged by my pony to running my brother Randy's motorcycle through a fence. Maybe that's why all my stories have action and adventure in them."

== Bibliography ==
=== Rock Harbor Series ===
- Without a Trace (2003)
- Beyond a Doubt (2004)
- Into the Deep (2004)
- Abomination (2007)
- Cry in the Night (2009)
- Silent Night (novella) (2012)
- Beneath Copper Falls (2017)
- Edge of Dusk (2022)

=== YA/Middle Grade Rock Harbor ===
- Rock Harbor Search and Rescue (2003)
- Rock Harbor Lost and Found (2013)

=== Children's Rock Harbor ===
- The Blessings Jar (2013)

=== Mercy Falls Series ===
- The Lightkeeper's Daughter (2010)
- The Lightkeeper's Bride (2010)
- The Lightkeeper's Ball (2011)

=== Standalones ===
- Love Ahoy (2001)
- From Russia with Love (2001)
- The Cattle Baron's Bride (2001)
- Maggie's Mistake (2002)
- Red River Bride (2003)
- Alaska Twilight (2006)
- Fire Dancer (2006)
- Where Shadows Meet (formerly Anathema) (2008)
- Butterfly Palace (2014)
- The Heart Answers (2016)
- To Love a Stranger (2016)
- Because You’re Mine (2017)
- Freedom’s Light (2018)
- Strands of Truth (2019)

=== The Lonestar Series ===
- Lonestar Sanctuary (2008)
- Lonestar Secrets (2009)
- Lonestar Homecoming (2010)
- Lonestar Angel (2011)
- All is Calm (novella) (2014)

=== Aloha Reef Series ===
- Distant Echoes (2005)
- Black Sands (2005)
- Dangerous Depths (2005)
- Midnight Sea (2007)
- Holy Night (novella) (2013)

=== Love Inspired, Steeple Hill ===
- Windigo Twilight (2005)
- Shadow Bones (2005)
- Stormcatcher (2006)

=== Under Texas Stars Series ===
- Blue Moon Promise
- Safe in His Arms (2013)
- Bluebonnet Bride (novella) (2014)

=== The Hope Beach Series ===
- Tidewater Inn (2012)
- Rosemary Cottage (2013)
- Seagrass Pier (2014)
- All Is Bright (2015)

=== Sunset Cove ===
- The Inn at Ocean’s Edge (2015)
- Mermaid Moon (2016)
- Twilight at Blueberry Barrens (2016)

=== Lavender Tides ===
- The View from Rainshadow Bay (2018)
- Leaving Lavender Tides (2018)
- The House at Saltwater Point (2018)
- Secrets at Cedar Cabin (2019)

=== Journey of the Heart series ===
- A Heart's Disguise (2015)
- A Heart's Obsession (2015)
- A Heart's Danger (2015)
- A Heart's Betrayal (2015)
- A Heart's Promise (2015)
- A Heart's Home (2015)

=== Pelican Harbor ===
- One Little Lie (2020)
- Two Reasons to Run (2020)
- Three Missing Days (2021)
