= Migration (Bonobo album) =

Studio album by Bonobo
- Released: 13 January 2017
- Genre: Electronica; ambient; downtempo; experimental
- Length: 61:53
- Label: Ninja Tune
- Producer: Simon Green

Bonobo chronology
The North Borders (2013)	Migration (2017)	Fragments (2022)

Migration is the sixth studio album by British DJ and record producer Simon Green, performing under the name Bonobo. It was released on 13 January 2017 through Ninja Tune. The album was recorded primarily on laptops rather than in a studio. It was supported by the release of several singles, including "Kerala". The album received generally positive reviews from critics and charted internationally, reaching the top five of the UK Albums Chart.

== Background ==
Migration was primarily written and recorded while Green was still on tour for his previous album, The North Borders. After the completion of the tour, Green completed a move from New York City to the Echo Park neighborhood of Los Angeles. The move, as well as the travelling for the tour and the deaths of some family members, led Green to contemplate on themes of identity, migration, and the environment. Because the tour for The North Borders consisted of approximately 175 shows across three continents for about eighteen months, the music for Migration was mainly created on a laptop as opposed to the studio environments of Green's previous albums.

== Artwork ==
Neil Krug served as the art director for the album. Green had tasked Krug to create artwork that was "beautifully sinister". Krug and Green decided that the artwork should be ambiguous and tease a thematically darker narrative. As a result, the artwork, which was captured in four hours, depicts the "Martian" landscapes of the Mojave Desert. The images were then digitally manipulated to add as much colour as possible "without being ridiculous".

== Release ==
The lead single, "Kerala", was released on 3 November 2016. The music video features Gemma Arterton attempting to run away from a meteor in a London suburb. "Break Apart" was released next on 6 December 2016. The third single, "No Reason", was released on 10 January 2017. The album was released by Ninja Tune on 13 January 2017.

As of 12 July 2017, Migration has sold 16,000 copies in the United States.

An alternative music video for "Break Apart" was released on 25 October 2017.

== Critical reception ==
Professional ratings
Aggregate scores
Source	Rating
AnyDecentMusic?	7.2/10
Metacritic	77/100
Review scores
Source	Rating
AllMusic	3.5/5 stars
Exclaim!	8/10
The Guardian	4/5 stars
The Irish Times	3/5 stars
Mixmag	9/10
Mojo	4/5 stars
The Observer	3/5 stars
Pitchfork	7.3/10
Q	4/5 stars
The Times	4/5 stars

Upon release, Migration received positive reviews by music critics. At Metacritic, which assigns a normalised rating out of 100 to reviews from mainstream publications, the album received an average score of 77, based on twenty reviews, indicating "generally favorable" reception.

Stephen Worthy of Mixmag called the album a "music-making masterclass" and praised its political themes and undertones. Writing for Exclaim!, Daryl Keating also highlighted the album's thematic elements: "Bonobo questions the very nature of home ... The result is an extremely reflective record, just a few shades more tranquil than his last two albums, but easily matching their well-produced splendour."

Some reviewers criticised the album for being unenterprising and too similar to Green's previous album, The North Borders. Andrew Ryce of Resident Advisor contrasted the album's themes with its cautious style, writing, "But rather than taking his sound anywhere, Migration stays put." In a mixed review for The Observer, Emily Mackay similarly criticised the album, calling it "a sonically rich album, perfect for gazing dreamily out of windows at passing landscapes, even if it doesn't reach any new destinations".

=== Accolades ===
Migration was nominated for Best Dance/Electronic Album at the 60th Annual Grammy Awards, though the award ultimately went to Kraftwerk for 3-D The Catalogue. The lead track "Bambro Koyo Ganda" was nominated for Best Dance Recording, which was ultimately won by LCD Soundsystem for "Tonite". The album won the Album of the Year award at the 2017 Electronic Music Awards.

== Track listing ==
All tracks are written by Simon Green, except where noted.

Migration track listing
No.	Title	Writer(s)	Length
1.	"Migration"	Green; Jon Hopkins	5:27
2.	"Break Apart" (featuring Rhye)		4:34
3.	"Outlier"		7:55
4.	"Grains"		4:28
5.	"Second Sun"	Green; John Mills-Cockell	3:43
6.	"Surface" (featuring Nicole Miglis)		4:11
7.	"Bambro Koyo Ganda" (featuring Innov Gnawa)		5:02
8.	"Kerala"		3:57
9.	"Ontario"		3:52
10.	"No Reason" (featuring Nick Murphy)	Green; Murphy	7:28
11.	"7th Sevens"		5:07
12.	"Figures"		6:08
Total length:			61:53

== Charts ==
=== Weekly charts ===
Weekly chart performance for Migration
Chart (2017)	Peak position
Australian Albums (ARIA)	12
Austrian Albums (Ö3 Austria)	15
Belgian Albums (Ultratop Flanders)	6
Belgian Albums (Ultratop Wallonia)	20
Canadian Albums (Billboard)	9
Dutch Albums (Album Top 100)	10
Finnish Albums (Suomen virallinen lista)	33
French Albums (SNEP)	35
German Albums (Offizielle Top 100)	11
Hungarian Albums (MAHASZ)	40
Irish Albums (IRMA)	15
Italian Albums (FIMI)	49
New Zealand Albums (RMNZ)	27
Polish Albums (ZPAV)	16
Scottish Albums (OCC)	15
Swiss Albums (Schweizer Hitparade)	5
UK Albums (OCC)	5
UK Dance Albums (OCC)	1
US Billboard 200	59
US Top Dance Albums (Billboard)	1

=== Year-end charts ===
Year-end chart performance for Migration
Chart (2017)	Rank
Australian Dance Albums (ARIA)	42
Belgian Albums (Ultratop Flanders)	119
Dutch Vinyl Albums (MegaCharts)	45

== Certifications ==
Certifications for Migration
Region	Certification	Certified units/sales
United Kingdom (BPI)	Silver	60,000^{‡}
^{‡} Sales+streaming figures based on certification alone.
