= Black Sands Entertainment =

American entertainment company

Black Sands Entertainment, Inc.
- Company type: Private company
- Industry: Entertainment
- Founded: 2016; 10 years ago
- Headquarters: Columbia, Maryland, US
- Area served: Worldwide
- Key people: Manuel Godoy; (Founder and CEO); Geiszel Godoy; (Co-Publisher and CFO)
- Products: Animation; Books; Comics
- Website: www.blacksandsentertainment.com

Black Sands Entertainment, Inc. is an American entertainment company founded in 2016 and based in Columbia, Maryland, US. The company is privately operated and is mainly known for its comic book publishing as well developing animated shorts within Black Sands Studios. It was founded in 2016 by Manuel Godoy and his wife, Geiszel, who serves as an author and producer and distributes comic books aimed towards African mythology, Afrofuturistic titles, and the education of children and adults. The plan is to create a Black entertainment media company that can deliver all kinds of content to Black consumers.

Black Sands publishes a number of graphic novels and comics with Afrofuturist themes, often coded in the non-fictional and fictional genres, and reissues of Afrofuturist titles from comic-book houses like DC and Dark Horse. Manuel and his wife, Geiszel, want to create Black media outside the realm of slavery and within historical means. In the end, creating worlds in which existing power structures are dismantled and Black people thrive.

== History ==
Black Sands Entertainment was established in 2016 by founder and CEO Manuel Godoy to provide indie comics by Black artists, written for Black families about Black people, with a focus on tales of Africa before slavery. The first publishing of the company was the launch of a video game named Kids 2 Kings. This was the original name, however, after Black Sands spent $20,000 on it and game production failed, Godoy transitioned to comic books. Black Sands started a Kickstarter campaign in 2017 and raised $20,000 for comic book production. but with the independent success of their titles, Black Sands Entertainment is transitioning into a publishing company.

The company created Black Sands: The Seven Kingdoms in 2017. The character Ausar, loosely based on the Egyptian god Ausar, was created by Manuel Godoy and the comic follows the time of gods and legends. Ausar is one of the four royal children with superpowers. They embark on an adventure to prove their ability to rule as kings and queens while undermining the secret plans of the great and powerful Sumerian god Marduk! Then, Geiszel released the children's book Mori’s Family Adventures in November 2017. The series will follow a black American family that spends their days traveling the world together, visiting remarkable countries, and having adventures. The first release was based in South Africa. In January 2019, Manuel then released the comic Cosmic Girls. This sci-fi comic follows two girls, one human, and one alien, that travel the galaxy together doing wild and crazy missions for the Common Wealth of Earth.

In 2020, Black Sands Studios was formed as an animation studio leg of Black Sands Entertainment. The independent animated content will be based on the bestselling comics of the Black Sands Entertainment library. It was founded by Manuel Godoy and Teunis de Raat. Teunis was picked up as partner & head of studio. Teunis will guide the development and production with his 25 years of experience as an artist, technical director, creative/technical lead, and VFX Supervisor with companies like Disney, Pixar, and ImageMovers.

In December 2020, Black Sands raised over $1 million on Wefunder, exceeding the company's fundraising goal.

The company launched the Black Sands Publishing app on May 1, 2021, which was Free Comic Book Day and will offer free access to 26 original comic books. The new app offers access to a variety of digital comics series created by Black Sands and about 16 independent publishers and artists. Among their projects are an upcoming animated series and to manage their intellectual property (characters) in other units as they work with other companies in the future.

In January 2022, Black Sands Entertainment was featured in the 13th series of ABC’s “Shark Tank”, represented by Geiszel, Manuel, and partner Teunis. They sought $500,000 in funding for the company for 5 percent of their company's equity. They accepted a handshake offer for $500,000 in funding from Kevin Hart and Mark Cuban in exchange for a 30 percent stake in the business. In November 2022, Kevin Hart and Mark Cuban have closed the deal.

== Titles ==
=== Original series ===
- Black Sands: The Seven Kingdoms
- Cosmic Girls
- Mori’s Family Adventures

== See also ==
- Webtoon
