= Dial 'M' for Monkey (album) =

Studio album by Bonobo
- Released: 17 June 2003
- Genre: Nu jazz; electronica; world; ambient; trip hop
- Length: 41:28
- Label: Ninja Tune; ZENCD80

Bonobo chronology
One Offs... Remixes & B-Sides (2002)	Dial 'M' for Monkey (2003)	It Came from the Sea (2005)

Professional ratings
Review scores
Source	Rating
Allmusic	4/5 stars
Tiny Mix Tapes	4/5 stars

Dial 'M' for Monkey is the second studio album by the British electronic music artist Bonobo. It was released on 17 June 2003.

== Track listing ==
All tracks written and performed by Bonobo.

No.	Title	Length
1.	"Noctuary"	5:22
2.	"Flutter"	4:44
3.	"D Song"	5:20
4.	"Change Down"	4:33
5.	"Wayward Bob"	4:39
6.	"Pick Up" (Flute – Andy Ross)	4:08
7.	"Something for Windy"	1:11
8.	"Nothing Owed" (Saxophone – Ben Cook)	6:16
9.	"Light Pattern"	5:12

The CD includes a QuickTime video of "Pick Up", an animated film with the accompaniment of track 6, produced by Conkerco.

== Trivia ==
The track "Flutter" was the only single released along with the album, with B-sides: "Pick Up (Four Tet Mix)" and "Something (Longer)".

== Use in media ==
- The tracks "Pick Up" and "Flutter" from were featured in the snowboarding game SSX on Tour.
- The track "Flutter" was used for the 2007 CBC Television series jPod, based on the Douglas Coupland novel of the same name.
- The track "Flutter" was used by Film4 in May 2009 on their commercials advertising films that were to be aired.
- "Flutter" appeared on the 3rd episode of the Channel 4 sitcom Nathan Barley.
- The track "Wayward Bob" is featured in the 2003 film Gumball 3000: The Movie.
- The album shares a title with a segment on the Cartoon Network series Dexter's Laboratory.

== Awards ==
In 2012 it was awarded a double silver certification from the Independent Music Companies Association which indicated sales of at least 40,000 copies throughout Europe.

== Release history ==
Region	Date	Label
United Kingdom	9 June 2003	Ninja Tune
France	9 June 2003	Ninja Tune
United States	17 June 2003	Ninja Tune
