= The North Borders =

Studio album by Bonobo
- Released: 21 March 2013
- Genre: Electronic; Trip hop; ambient; chill-out
- Length: 58:43
- Label: Ninja Tune (ZEN195)
- Producer: Bonobo

Bonobo chronology
Black Sands (2010)	The North Borders (2013)	Migration (2017)

Singles from The North Borders
- 1. "Cirrus" Released: 21 January 2013; 2. "First Fires" Released: 20 May 2013

Professional ratings
Aggregate scores
Source	Rating
Metacritic	75/100
Review scores
Source	Rating
AllMusic	4/5 stars
Austin Chronicle	4/5 stars
Clash	9/10
Consequence of Sound	C+
Drowned In Sound	7/10
Exclaim!	7/10
musicOMH	4/5 stars
Pitchfork	6.0
Q	4/5 stars
PopMatters	6/10 stars

The North Borders is the fifth studio album by British musician Bonobo. It was due for release on 1 April 2013, but was released early on 21 March in digital format after a promotional copy was leaked. The album charted at number 29 on the UK Albums Chart. As of 20 January 2017 it had sold 56,993 copies in UK.

== Packaging ==
The artwork for North Borders and its singles were created by Australian art director and album artist Leif Podhajsky.

== Track listing ==
Digital download and CD
No.	Title	Writer(s)	Length
1.	"First Fires" (featuring Grey Reverend)	Simon Green, Larry D. Brow	4:38
2.	"Emkay"	Green	5:25
3.	"Cirrus"	Green	5:52
4.	"Heaven for the Sinner" (featuring Erykah Badu)	Green, Erica Abi Wright	4:09
5.	"Sapphire"	Green	4:47
6.	"Jets"	Green	4:34
7.	"Towers" (featuring Szjerdene)	Green, Szjerdene	3:36
8.	"Don't Wait"	Green	5:17
9.	"Know You"	Green	4:05
10.	"Antenna"	Green	3:32
11.	"Ten Tigers"	Green	4:03
12.	"Transits" (featuring Szjerdene)	Green, Szjerdene	4:20
13.	"Pieces" (featuring Cornelia)	Green, Cornelia Dahlgren	4:27

Vinyl
No.	Title	Writer(s)	Length
1.	"First Fires" (featuring Grey Reverend)	Simon Green, Larry D. Brow	4:38
2.	"Emkay"	Green	5:25
3.	"Don't Wait"	Green	5:17
4.	"Cirrus"	Green	5:52
5.	"Heaven for the Sinner" (featuring Erykah Badu)	Green, Erica Abi Wright	4:09
6.	"Towers" (featuring Szjerdene)	Green, Szjerdene	3:36
7.	"Jets"	Green	4:34
8.	"Antenna"	Green	3:32
9.	"Know You"	Green	4:05
10.	"Ten Tigers"	Green	4:03
11.	"Sapphire"	Green	4:47
12.	"Transits" (featuring Szjerdene)	Green, Szjerdene	4:20
13.	"Pieces" (featuring Cornelia)	Green, Cornelia Dahlgren	4:27

== Charts ==
Chart (2012)	Peak position
UK Albums Chart	29
UK Dance Albums Chart	4
UK Independent Albums Chart	4

== Trivia ==
- The track "Ten Tigers" is probably named after the Ten Tigers of Canton.
- The track "Cirrus" was featured as the closing song of the pilot episode for the AMC show Halt and Catch Fire.

== Certifications ==
Region	Certification	Certified units/sales
United Kingdom (BPI)	Silver	60,000^{‡}
^{‡} Sales+streaming figures based on certification alone.
