= Born Under Saturn =

Studio album by Django Django
- Released: 4 May 2015
- Recorded: 2014
- Studio: Angelic
- Genre: Art rock
- Length: 56:04
- Label: Because Music
- Producers: David Maclean & Neil Comber

Django Django chronology
Django Django (2012)	Born Under Saturn (2015)	Marble Skies (2018)

Born Under Saturn is the second studio album by British art rock band Django Django. It reached number 15 on the UK Albums Chart in May 2015.

== Reception ==
Professional ratings
Aggregate scores
Source	Rating
Metacritic	72/100
Review scores
Source	Rating
AllMusic	4/5 stars
Alternative Press	3.5/5 stars
Clash	7/10
DIY	4/5 stars
Drowned in Sound	8/10
Exclaim!	8/10
Mojo	4/5 stars
MusicOMH	4/5 stars
Paste	8.2/10
Pitchfork	5.6/10
PopMatters	5/10 stars
Under the Radar	8/10 stars

Born Under Saturn received positive reviews from critics. On Metacritic, the album holds a score of 72 out of 100 based on 21 reviews, indicating "generally favorable reviews".

== Accolades ==
Publication	Accolade	Year	Rank
Rough Trade	Albums of the Year 2015	2015	17

== Track listing ==
All tracks are written by David Maclean, Thomas Grace, Vincent Neff, Jim Dixon.

No.	Title	Length
1.	"Giant"	5:54
2.	"Shake & Tremble"	4:19
3.	"Found You"	4:43
4.	"First Light"	4:50
5.	"Pause Repeat"	3:29
6.	"Reflections"	4:20
7.	"Vibrations"	3:08
8.	"Shot Down"	5:09
9.	"High Moon"	4:43
10.	"Beginning to Fade"	3:16
11.	"4000 Years"	4:17
12.	"Break the Glass"	4:30
13.	"The Life we Know"	3:24

== Personnel ==
- Vincent Neff – lead vocals, guitars
- Jim Nixon – bass guitar, backing vocals, keyboards
- Tommy Grace – keyboards, backing vocals, drum programming, samples
- Dave Maclean – drums, percussion, drum programming

Additional musicians

- Lindsey Leven, Sadia McEwen, Asahana Davidson - Backing Vocals on "Giant"
- Rachel Lander - Cello on "Beinging To Fade"
- James Mainwaring - Saxophone on "Reflections" and "4000 Years"

== Tour ==
The band toured the album through Europe and North America, from May 2015 until September 2015.

== Charts ==
Chart performance for Born Under Saturn
Chart (2015)	Peak position
Australian Albums (ARIA)	56
Belgian Albums (Ultratop Flanders)	55
Belgian Albums (Ultratop Wallonia)	67
Dutch Albums (Album Top 100)	60
French Albums (SNEP)	34
Irish Albums (IRMA)	31
Scottish Albums (Official Charts)	11
Swiss Albums (Schweizer Hitparade)	57
UK Albums (Official Charts)	15
US Heatseekers Albums (Billboard)	9
