= Black Sands (album) =

Studio album by Bonobo
- Released: 29 March 2010
- Genre: Electronica; nu jazz; new-age; trip hop; chill-out
- Length: 55:06
- Label: Ninja Tune

Bonobo chronology
Days to Come (2006)	Black Sands (2010)	The North Borders (2013)

Professional ratings
Aggregate scores
Source	Rating
Metacritic	73/100
Review scores
Source	Rating
Allmusic	3.5/5 stars
BBC	(positive)
Drowned In Sound	7/10
Mojo	3/5 stars
musicOMH	4.5/5 stars
PopMatters	7/10 stars
Q	3/5 stars
Sputnikmusic (emeritus)	3.5/5
The Times	4/5 stars
Tiny Mix Tapes	3/5 marks

Black Sands is the fourth studio album by English producer Bonobo. It was released on 29 March 2010.

== Artwork ==
The cover features a photograph taken of Derwentwater, in northern England. The tower in the background is located in Castlerigg (54°35′29.95″N 3°7′3.43″W).

== Track listing ==
All tracks written and performed by Bonobo.

No.	Title	Length
1.	"Prelude"	1:18
2.	"Kiara"	3:50
3.	"Kong"	3:58
4.	"Eyesdown" (featuring Andreya Triana)	5:26
5.	"El Toro"	3:44
6.	"We Could Forever"	4:20
7.	"1009"	4:30
8.	"All in Forms"	4:52
9.	"The Keeper" (featuring Andreya Triana)	4:49
10.	"Stay the Same" (featuring Andreya Triana)	4:45
11.	"Animals"	6:45
12.	"Black Sands"	6:49

Japanese edition bonus track
No.	Title	Length
13.	"Brace Brace"	7:02

== Personnel ==
Credits for Black Sands adapted from album liner notes.

- Bonobo – piano (tracks 1 & 12), bass (tracks 3, 5, 6, 8, 9 & 10), upright bass (tracks 1, 11 & 12), guitars (tracks 3, 8, 9 & 11), classical guitar (tracks 5, 10 & 12), mandolin (track 12), keyboards (tracks 3, 8, 10 & 11), Fender Rhodes (tracks 5, 6 & 9), harmonium (tracks 1, 6 & 12), harp (track 4), xylophone (track 12), music box (track 10)
- Andreya Triana – vocals (tracks 4, 9 & 10)
- Mike Simmonds – violins (tracks 1, 2, 5 & 12), violas (track 5)
- Mike Lesirge – flute (tracks 5 & 12), saxophone (track 5), clarinet (track 12)
- Alan Hardiman – trombone (tracks 5 & 12)
- Ryan Jacob – trumpet (tracks 5 & 12)
- Jack Wyllie – saxophone (tracks 10)
- Tom Chant – saxophone, bass clarinet (tracks 11)
- Graham Fox – drums (track 11)
- Jack Baker – drums (track 12)

== Use in media ==
"All In Forms", appeared in the film House at the End of the Street in 2012. Additionally, "Kong" can be heard during a scene in an artist's studio in the eighth episode of the second season of House of Cards, and Eyesdown can be heard in the background in the restaurant in the second episode of the third season of The Newsroom. The song "Black Sands" is the title-song of the French 2015-movie 'The Measure of a Man'. "Kiara" also appears in the video game Sleeping Dogs.

== Awards ==
As of November 2016, it was certified silver by British Phonographic Industry for 60,000 sold units in UK. As of January 20, 2017 it has sold 72,756 copies in UK.

== Certifications ==
Region	Certification	Certified units/sales
United Kingdom (BPI)	Gold	100,000^{‡}
^{‡} Sales+streaming figures based on certification alone.
