= Medlar (musician) =

British DJ

Medlar is the stage name of the British deep house producer Ned Pegler (born 1985 or 1986). His first releases were published in 2010 under his alias Klic on his co-owned label Hit and Hope. Since 2011 he releases under the London-based Wolf Music label.

He is influenced by Chicago house, Detroit techno, disco and hip hop, but started his career as Drum and Bass DJ in Brighton around 2003 or 2005. Due to an internship at the Brighton-based Label Mr Bongo Records he came in contact with House music and also the later label boss of Wolf Music, Matt Wolf. There he released his first track, "Terrell", in 2011.

== Discography ==
=== Albums ===
as Medlar:

- Sleep (2013)

=== EPs ===
as Klic:

- Dachshund Skank (2010)
- Disco Music (2011)
- Won't (with Lokiboi) (2011)
- Dachshund Skank Remixes (2011)
- Slow Down (with Lokiboi) (2011)

as Medlar:

- "Terrell" on Wolf EP 8 (2011)
- "Floor" on Wolf EP 9 (2011)
- "Can't Stop" on Wolf EP 11 (2012)
- "The Sun", "Knockard Pearl" and "Govern" on Wolf EP 16 (2012)
- "Carry it" on Wolf EP 18 (2013)
- Sleep (Remixes And 12" Versions) (2014)
- Walk (with Dan Shake) (2015)
