= Stealing Sheep =

English pop band

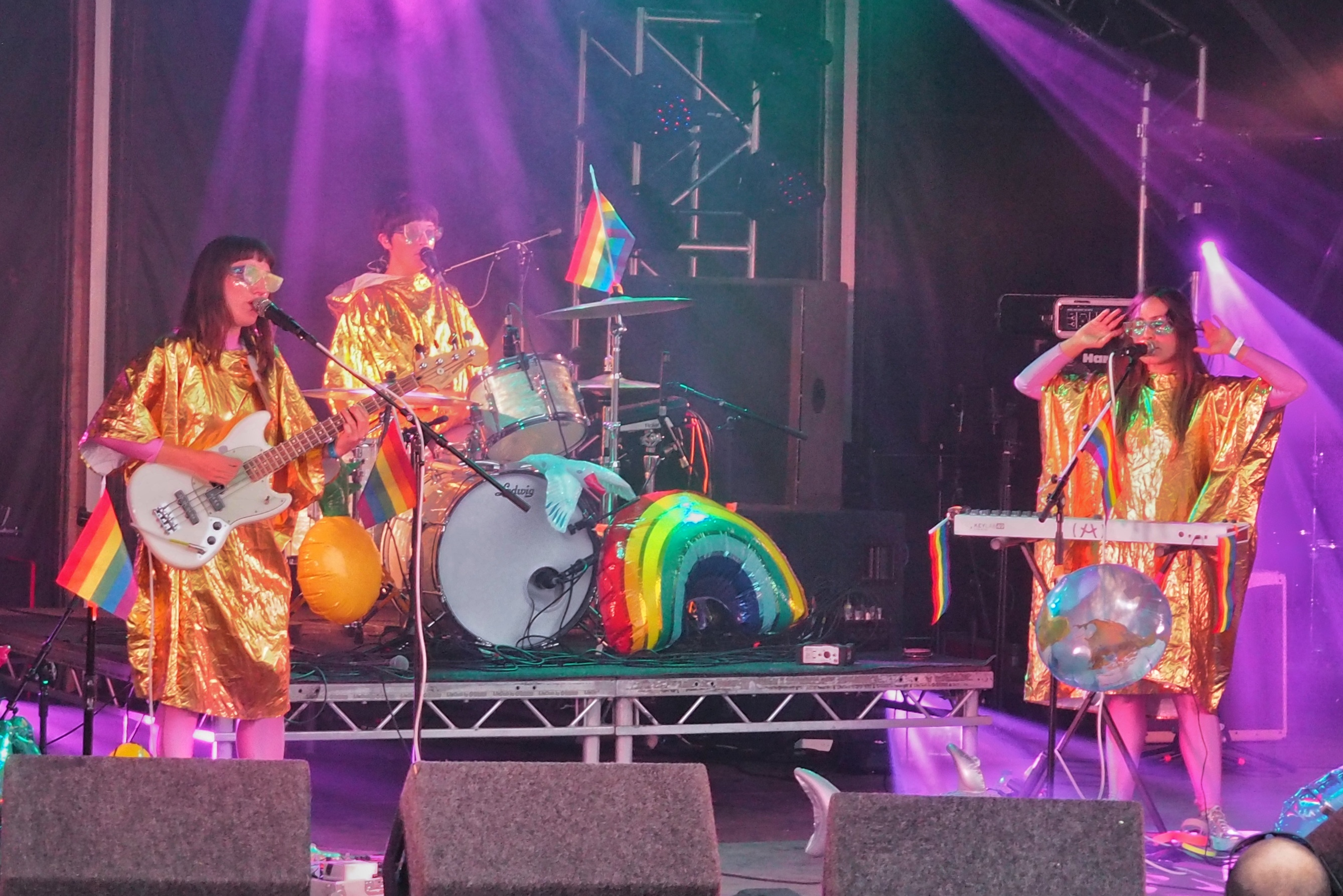

Background information
- Origin: Liverpool, England
- Genres: Pop
- Years active: 2010–present
- Label: Heavenly Recordings
- Members: Rebecca Hawley; Emily Lansley; Luciana Mercer

Stealing Sheep are a pop band from Liverpool, England, who formed in 2010. The three members are Rebecca Hawley (vocals and keys), Emily Lansley (vocals, guitar, bass guitar) and Luciana Mercer (vocals and drum kit).

The band released The Mountain Dogs and I Am the Rain both in 2011. Those were collected on Noah and the Paper Moon in 2012. The debut studio album Into the Diamond Sun was released in 2012 by Heavenly Recordings.

The band's second album, Not Real, was released on 13 April 2015 and their third, Big Wows, followed on 19 April 2019. In November 2021 Stealing Sheep supported Orchestral Manoeuvres in the Dark on their Architecture & More Tour around the UK.

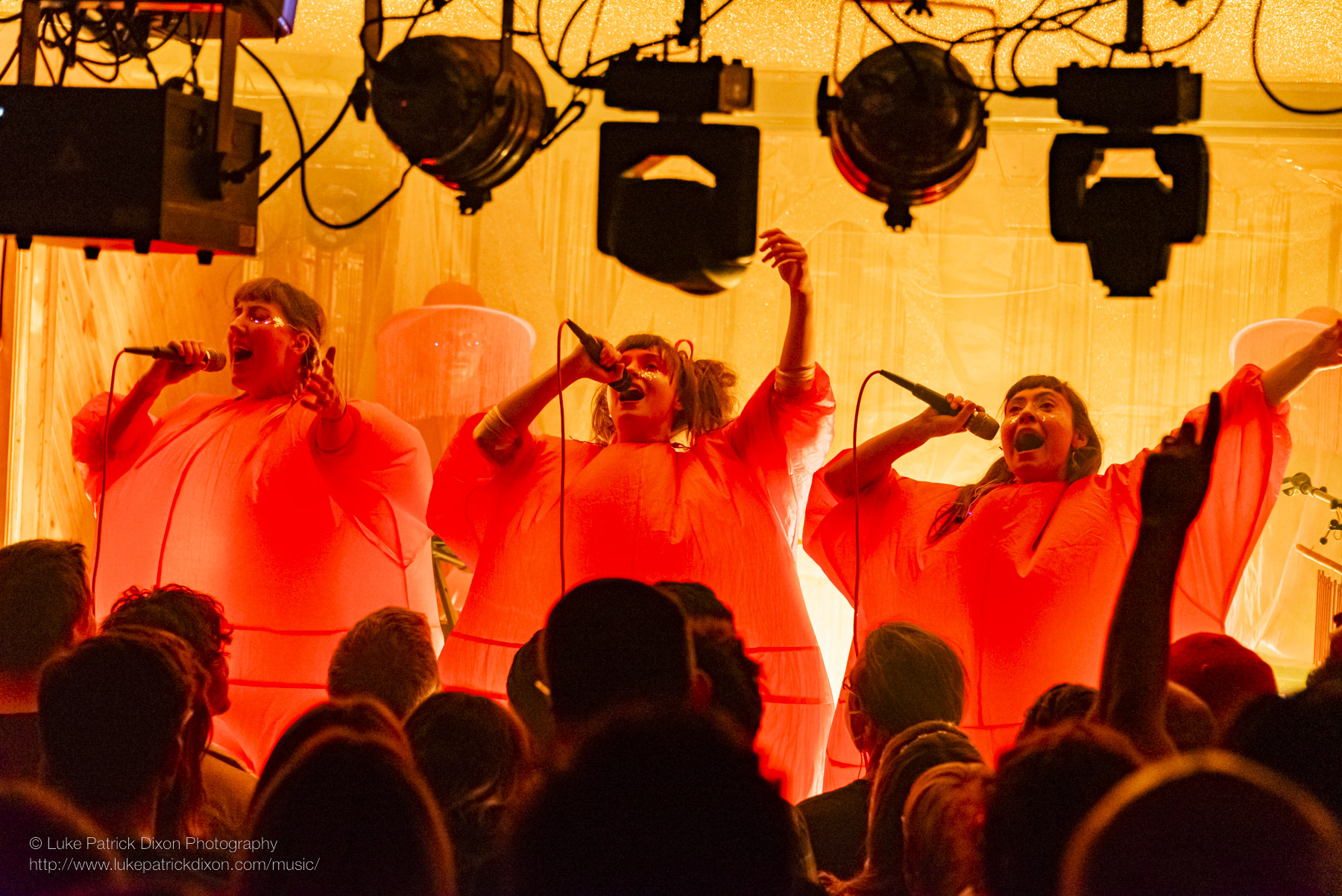
Stealing Sheep performing at The Moth Club November 2022

The band's influences include the Knife, Kraftwerk, Talking Heads, Moondog, Sia, Daft Punk and Can.

== Discography ==
Studio albums

- Into the Diamond Sun (2012, Heavenly Recordings)
- Not Real (2015, Heavenly Recordings)
- Big Wows (2019, Heavenly Recordings)
- La Planète Sauvage (2021, Fire Records, with The Radiophonic Workshop)
- Wow Machine (2022, Both Sides Records)
- GLO (Girl Life Online) (2025, self-released)

EPs

- Stealing Sheep (2009, self-released)
- What If the Lights Went Out? (2010, self-released)
- The Mountain Dogs (2011, Red Deer Club)
- I Am the Rain (2011, Red Deer Club)
- Noah and the Paper Moon (2012, Heavenly Recordings)
