= Fakear =

French electronic music producer (born 1991)

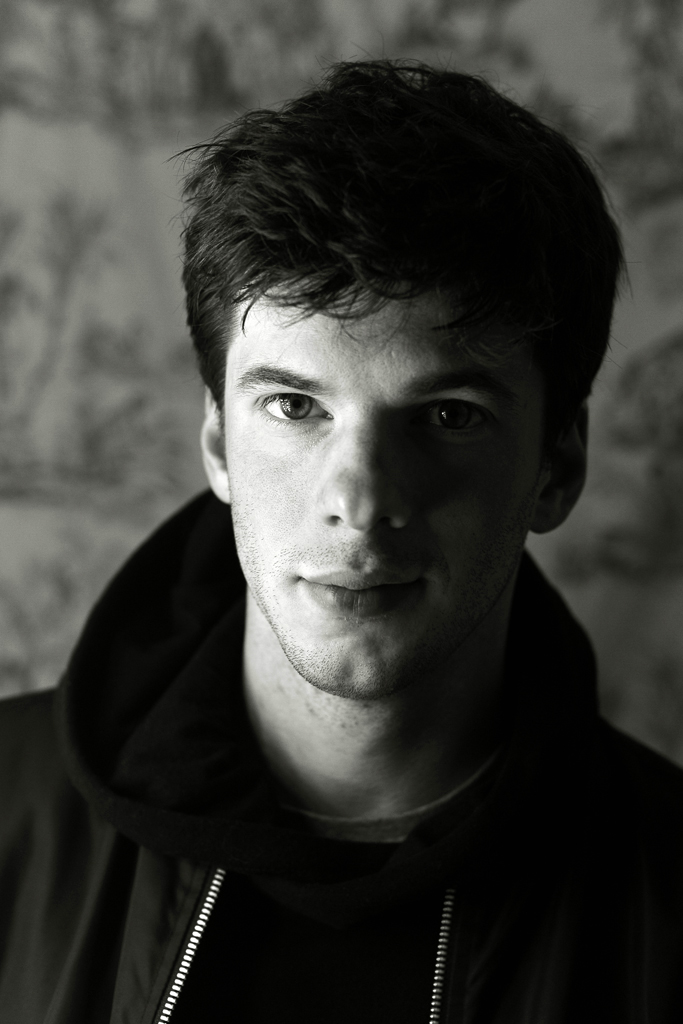

Background information
- Birth name: Théo Le Vigoureux
- Born: 13 May 1991 (age 34); Caen, Normandy, France
- Genres: Electronic
- Years active: 2011–present
- Labels: Nowadays Records; Théo Le Vigoureux; Caroline France

Fakear (/feɪˈkɪər/), born Théo Le Vigoureux on 13 May 1991, is a French DJ, musician, and producer of electronic music.

== Discography ==
Studio albums

- Washin' Machine (2012)
- Animal (2016)
- All Glows (2018)
- Everything Will Grow Again (2020)
- Talisman (2023)
- Hypertalisman (2024)

EPs

- Bird (2011)
- Pictural EP (2011)
- Backstreet EP (2011)
- Dark Lands (2013)
- Morning in Japan (2013)
- Sauvage (2014)
- Vegetal (2016)
- Asakusa (2015)
- Karmaprana (2017)
- EWGA Remixed (2021)
- Voyager (2022)
- Nova (2023)
- Hypertalisman Rebuild (2024)

Live albums

- Cercle: Fakear Live at Tal Mixta, Malta (2018)

Singles

- "Lacrimosa" (2013)
- "Piece of Little Mind" (2013)
- "La belle âme" (2016)
- "Tigers (Thylacine Remix)" (2016)
- "Out of Reach" (2017)
- "Give Me a Sign" (feat. Dana Williams) (2017)
- "Lost in Time" (feat. Polo & Pan, Noraa & Clément Bazin) (2018)
- "5th Season" (with La fine équipe) (2018)
- "Mana" (2018)
- "Nausicaa" (2019)
- "Fugitive" (2019)
- "Kobra" (feat. Pouvoir Magique) (2019)
- "Kanagawa Waves 1831" (with the Geek x VRV & Balkan Bump) (2019)
- "Kanzan" (with CloZee, Pouvoir Magique & Einki) (2020)
- "Carrie" (feat. Alex Metric) (2020)
- "Shantra" (Pouvoir Magique & Einki feat. Fakear) (2021)
- "Sanctuary" (2021)
