= Telephone Thing =

Single by The Fall
- B-side: "British People in Hot Weather"
- Released: January 1990
- Genre: Post-punk
- Length: 4:20
- Label: Cog Sinister
- Songwriter(s): Mark E. Smith, Jonathan More, Matt Black
- Producer(s): Coldcut

The Fall singles chronology
"Cab It Up" (1989)	"Telephone Thing" (1990)	"High Tension Line" (1990)

"Telephone Thing" is a song by British post-punk band the Fall, written by Mark E. Smith with Coldcut members Matt Black and Jonathan More. Produced and mixed by Coldcut, it was released as a single in January 1990 and reached number 58 on the UK singles chart. It also featured on the Fall's twelfth album, Extricate.

== Recording ==
The duo Coldcut first collaborated with Smith on the song ""(I'm) In Deep", one of the tracks on their debut album What's That Noise?. Another track on the album, "My Telephone", featured Lisa Stansfield and was a minor chart hit in 1989. Jonathan More said of Smith, "He thought the vocals and all the rest of the stuff we did on it were shit, but he really liked the guitar, bass and drums, and he gave the cassette to his band to learn these parts." The band — Martin Bramah (guitar), Craig Scanlon (guitar), Steve Hanley (bass), Marcia Schofield (keyboards), and Simon Wolstencroft (drums) — learned the tune, and Mark E. Smith wrote lyrics ranting against telephone tapping at a time when he thought his calls were being intercepted.

Smith said:

[Coldcut's recording] was a misjustice to the tune. That single was a flop and it was rubbish. You see, they compose all their shit on machines, so I got the band to learn it, played naturally. So it's very different indeed. I just think it's topical - like all Fall singles. I think it's good to have a go at things like that - British Rail and British Telecom. It's a natural gripe. One time, I was using the phone a lot and I dialled a number and I could hear people munching sandwiches and talking about my last phone call. I actually rang up the operator and said 'Lookl I'm trying to dial a fucking number here and I can't get through because people are talking about my phone calls! Have you got a bleedin' license to do this?

Smith's lyrics include the lines "How dare you assume I want to parlez-vous with you / Gretchen Franklin, nosey matron thing...". Gretchen Franklin was the actress playing the part of Ethel Skinner, an elderly busybody in the BBC TV soap opera EastEnders. Smith claimed:

I thought I'd made up that name. Coldcut and Craig Leon were going to me 'That's a great name to make up, Gretchen Franklin', it just came out of nowhere. And then I was watching EastEnders and ... it was terrible! Maybe she'll be flattered, you usually find people are flattered. I don't even watch fucking EastEnders. I hate it! It must've just lodged there somewhere, out of the blue. It's subliminal - I've nothing against her - I can't even remember what she looks like now.... OH NO! It's not the woman with the dog is it? It's not!

As well as being released as a single and on the album Extricate, the song featured on several live albums by the Fall.

== Legacy ==
James Murphy paid tribute to the song by using the phrase "I'm tapped" on the LCD Soundsystem song "Movement", copying Smith's pronunciation ("tapped-uh").
