= Extricate =

Studio album by The Fall
- Released: 19 February 1990
- Recorded: Mid–late 1989
- Studio: Southern Studios, London; Swanyard Studios, London; The Manor, Oxfordshire; Wool Hall, Somerset
- Genre: Post-punk; Madchester
- Length: 40:51 (LP and 2007 CD reissue); 54:32 (MC and 1990 CD)
- Label: Fontana
- Producer: Craig Leon; Adrian Sherwood; Coldcut; Mark E. Smith

The Fall chronology
Seminal Live (1989)	Extricate (1990)	Shift-Work (1991)

Singles from Extricate
- 1. "Telephone Thing" Released: 15 January 1990; 2. "Popcorn, Double Feature" Released: 12 March 1990

Professional ratings
Review scores
Source	Rating
AllMusic	4/5 stars
Mojo	3/5 stars
NME	10/10
Pitchfork	7.9/10
Q	3/5 stars
Record Mirror	4/5
The Rolling Stone Album Guide	3.5/5 stars
Sounds	5/5 stars
Spin Alternative Record Guide	7/10
Uncut	5/5 stars

Extricate is the 12th album by the English post-punk band the Fall. It was made immediately after bandleader Mark E. Smith divorced guitarist Brix Smith. Brix's departure helped define the sound of this album: her background vocals and relatively pop-oriented guitar, which had become mainstays of The Fall, are noticeably absent in this release. In one of the more unusual events in the group's career, she was replaced by founding former member Martin Bramah, who had previously left the group in 1979 to form his own group Blue Orchids.

Lead-off single "Telephone Thing" could have been seen as a nod to the Manchester scene of the time as the sound is quite similar to the dance-influenced music that was being released by Happy Mondays and The Stone Roses in 1989. However, its origins were in Smith's previous collaboration with Coldcut on their track "I'm in Deep", which, in turn, led to Coldcut producing the track and "Black Monk Theme Part II", one of two tracks by 60s garage band The Monks to be covered on the album (the other being "Black Monk Theme" – The Fall retitled both tracks). Elsewhere, Bramah, appearing on his first Fall album since Live at the Witch Trials, adds a distinctly raw, even rockabilly sound to some of the songs. However, the album's best-known track was one of the least typical of the group's catalogue: "Bill Is Dead", a slow-paced tender love song which topped John Peel's Festive Fifty that year, the only occasion in the DJ's lifetime when his favourite band would do so. Although originally conceived by Smith and Craig Scanlon as a parody of The Smiths, Smith changed lyrical tack when he decided Scanlon's music deserved better, delivering a highly personal lyric. However, at Smith's insistence, it was not released as a single.

The critical reception to Extricate was largely positive, with Melody Maker suggesting that it was "possibly their finest yet" and NME giving the album a full 10/10. During the Australian leg of the tour accompanying the album, both Martin Bramah and Marcia Schofield were sacked from the group.

The album was re-released in an expanded and re-mastered edition by Universal in May 2007. It would be reissued on vinyl in August 2023, for the first time since 1990, albeit omitting the CD-exclusive bonus tracks.

== Track listing ==
=== Original UK LP ===
Side 1
No.	Title	Writer(s)	Producer(s)	Length
1.	"Sing! Harpy"	Mark E. Smith, Martin Bramah (as "M. Beddington")	Craig Leon	5:24
2.	"I'm Frank"	Smith, Craig Scanlon	Leon	3:21
3.	"Bill Is Dead"	Smith, Scanlon	Leon	4:32
4.	"Black Monk Theme Part I" (originally titled "I Hate You")	The Monks	Leon; Mark E. Smith	4:35
5.	"Popcorn, Double Feature"	Scott English, Larry Weiss	Leon	3:43

Side 2
No.	Title	Writer(s)	Producer(s)	Length
1.	"Telephone Thing"	Smith, Matt Black, Jon More	Coldcut	4:12
2.	"Hilary"	Smith	Leon	2:30
3.	"Chicago, Now!"	Smith	Leon	5:59
4.	"The Littlest Rebel"	Smith, Scanlon, Steve Hanley, Simon Wolstencroft	Adrian Sherwood	3:36
5.	"And Therein..."	Smith, Bramah	Leon; Smith	2:53
Total length:				40:51

=== CD and cassette editions ===
No.	Title	Writer(s)	Producer(s)	Length
1.	"Sing! Harpy"	Smith, Bramah	Leon	5:24
2.	"I'm Frank"	Smith, Scanlon	Leon	3:22
3.	"Bill Is Dead"	Smith, Scanlon	Leon	4:33
4.	"Black Monk Theme Part I"	The Monks	Leon; Smith	4:35
5.	"Popcorn, Double Feature"	English, Weiss	Leon	3:44
6.	"Arms Control Poseur"	Smith, Scanlon, Wolstencroft	Sherwood	4:44
7.	"Black Monk Theme Part II" (originally titled "Oh, How to Do Now")	The Monks	Coldcut	2:01
8.	"Telephone Thing"	Smith, Black, More	Coldcut	4:12
9.	"Hilary"	Smith	Leon	2:30
10.	"Chicago, Now!"	Smith	Leon	5:59
11.	"The Littlest Rebel"	Smith, Scanlon, Hanley, Wolstencroft	Sherwood	3:37
12.	"British People in Hot Weather"	Smith, Scanlon, Hanley, Wolstencroft	Sherwood	3:07
13.	"And Therein..."	Smith, Bramah	Leon; Smith	2:54
14.	"Extricate"	Smith, Scanlon, Hanley, Adrian Sherwood	Sherwood	3:46
Total length:				54:32

- Of the four extra tracks added, "Arms Control Poseur" and "Black Monk Theme, Part II" were released as B-sides to "Popcorn Double Feature", the former in an alternate version. "British People in Hot Weather" was released as the B-side to "Telephone Thing".

=== 2007 reissue ===
==== Disc 1 ====
- as per original UK LP

Disc 2
No.	Title	Writer(s)	Producer(s)	Length
1.	"Telephone Thing" (extended mix) (from "Telephone Thing" 12" single)	Smith, Black, More	Coldcut	4:19
2.	"Telephone Dub" (from "Telephone Thing" 12" single)	Smith, Black, More	Coldcut	4:27
3.	"British People in Hot Weather" (from "Telephone Thing" single)	Smith, Scanlon, Hanley, Wolstencroft	Sherwood	3:07
4.	"Butterflies 4 Brains" (from "Popcorn Double Feature" single)	Smith, Scanlon, Hanley, Wolstencroft	Smith	4:15
5.	"Arms Control Poseur" (single version) (from "Popcorn Double Feature" single)	Smith, Scanlon, Wolstencroft	Sherwood	5:03
6.	"Arms Control Poseur" (from Extricate CD)	Smith, Scanlon, Wolstencroft	Sherwood	4:46
7.	"Zandra" (from limited edition "Popcorn Double Feature" single)	Smith, Bramah	Smith	2:47
8.	"Black Monk Theme Part II" (from limited edition "Popcorn Double Feature" single)	The Monks	Coldcut	2:01
9.	"Extricate" (from Extricate CD)	Smith, Scanlon, Hanley, Sherwood	Sherwood	3:47
10.	"Theme From Error-Orrori" (from the various artist compilation album Home, 1990; originally credited to "Mark E. Smith/M. Beddington/S. Hanley/S. Wolstencroft")	Smith, Bramah, Hanley, Wolstencroft	uncredited	4:11
11.	"Chicago Now!" (Peel Session, December 1989)	Smith	Dale Griffin	5:34
12.	"Black Monk Theme" (Peel Session, December 1989; this is "Part 1")	The Monks	Griffin	4:07
13.	"Hilary" (Peel Session, December 1989)	Smith	Griffin	2:23
14.	"Whizz Bang"" (Peel Session, December 1989; not originally broadcast, later reworked as "Butterflies 4 Brains")	Smith, Scanlon, Hanley, Wolstencroft	Griffin	3:01
Total length:				54:02

== Personnel ==
The Fall

- Mark E. Smith – vocals
- Martin Bramah – guitar, backing vocals
- Craig Scanlon – guitar
- Steve Hanley – bass guitar
- Marcia Schofield – keyboards, percussion, backing vocals
- Simon Wolstencroft – drums

Additional personnel

- Kenny Brady – fiddle
- Charlotte Bill – flute, oboe
- Mike Edwards (of Jesus Jones) – guitar on "Popcorn Double Feature"
- Craig Leon – backing vocals, organ
- Cassell Webb (wife of Craig Leon; credited as "Castle") – backing vocals, organ

Technical

- Craig Leon – production, mixing
- Adrian Sherwood – production, mixing
- Coldcut – production, mixing
- Mark E. Smith – production, mixing
- Alaistar – engineering
- George Shilling – engineering
- Ian Gillespie – engineering
- "A bunch of guys in ponytails" – engineering
- Anthony Frost – front cover painting
- Bob Berry – front cover painting photograph
- Pointblanc – artwork
- Paul Cox – band photography
