= Say Kids What Time Is It? =

"Say Kids What Time Is it?"

Single by Coldcut
- Released: 1987
- Recorded: 1987
- Genre: Instrumental hip hop; golden age hip hop; breakbeat
- Length: 4:46 (Single version); 2:22 (Music video edit)
- Label: Ahead of Our Time
- Songwriter(s): Matthew Cohn, Jonathan More
- Producer(s): Matt Black, Jonathan More

Coldcut singles chronology
"Say Kids What Time Is it?" (1987)	"Beats + Pieces" (1987)

"Say Kids What Time Is It?" is the debut single of British dance music duo Coldcut. It is renowned as one of the first tracks to be built entirely around music sampling.

== Background ==
=== Release of the single ===
The single was originally released in early 1987 as a white label 12" single on Ahead of Our Time Records, with only 500 copies pressed for sale. However, as the song started to pick up some popularity, more copies were pressed, again on the 12" vinyl single.

=== Song background ===
The track was built entirely around various samples. The song started with the sampled line "Say kids, what time is it?" from the theme song to the children's television show Howdy Doody, from which the song took its title. The song sampled many hip hop, funk and soul tracks as well.

Coldcut would later gain more popularity in the music scene with their remix of the Eric B. & Rakim song "Paid in Full", which also incorporated the use of various samples. It also used the "Goodnight, kids" sample originally sampled from Howdy Doody, which was also used in "Say Kids What Time Is It?".

=== Influence ===
Shortly after the release of sample-built records such as "Say Kids What Time Is It?", the popularity of sample-built tracks began to emerge. The tracks "Pump Up the Volume" by M|A|R|R|S and "Theme from S'Express" by S'Express, which both similarly incorporated the sample style of "Say Kids What Time Is It?", both peaked at No. 1 on the UK Singles Chart. Coldcut themselves, still incorporating their sampling style, experienced more success with singles such as "Doctorin' the House".

== Music video ==
The song's low-budget music video consisted of low-quality, grainy scenes of people partying and dancing, with various speech bubbles and subtitles added during some shots.

The video was edited to be only 2 minutes and 22 seconds long, cutting out roughly 2 minutes of the original track.

== Track listing ==
12" white label single (EFA, MS 17082 02)

A1. "Say Kids What Time Is It?"
B1. untitled
B2. untitled
B3. untitled
B4. untitled

12" single (not on label, BOOT 1)

A. "Say Kids (What Time Is It?)"
B1. untitled (instrumental cut-up)
B2. untitled (instrumental cut-up)
B3. untitled (samples for scratching)
B4. untitled (samples for scratching)

12" single (release credited as "Say Kids", Ahead of Our Time, CCUT 8 TL)

A. "Find a Way" (with Queen Latifah)
B1. "Say Kids"
B2. "Untitled (Breaks)"
B3. "Untitled (Breaks)"
