= Listen & Learn (Hexstatic album) =

Solid Steel Presents: Listen & Learn

Compilation album by Hexstatic
- Released: 27 January 2003
- Label: Ninja Tune; ZENCD075

Hexstatic chronology
Rewind (2000)	Solid Steel Presents: Listen & Learn (2003)	Master-View (2004)

Solid Steel chronology
DJ Food & DK: Now, Listen! (2001)	Hexstatic: Listen & Learn (2003)	The Herbaliser: Herbal Blend (2003)

Professional ratings
Review scores
Source	Rating
Allmusic	link

Solid Steel Presents Hexstatic – "Listen & Learn" is a DJ mix album, mixed by Hexstatic, released as part of the Solid Steel mix series.

The album cover features a Speak & Spell – an educational toy, which was popular in the 1980s.

== Track listing ==
1. "Telemetron" (Hexstatic Intro Dub) – Hexstatic
2. "Streetcrawler" – Monophone
3. "Mr. Scruff's Ninja Tune Megamix" (Hexstatic Edit) – DJ Food / "No, No, No" – Dawn Penn
4. "Solid Steel Scratch School"
5. "The Message" – DJ Grandmaster Flash
6. "Funky Mule" – Ike & Tina Turner
7. "Rip Rip" – David Holmes
8. "Funky Kingston" – Toots & the Maytals
9. "Jazzy John's Dub" – Stonebridge
10. "Solid Steel Rock School"
11. "Chrome Jam" – Trunk / "I'm Wild About That Thing" – Coldcut
12. "Aquarius" – Boards of Canada
13. "Easy Thing To Do" (Nightmares on Wax mix) – Shirley Bassey
14. "Daily Intake" – Unsung Heroes
15. "Wildstyle" – Timezone/ "Hip Hop be Bop" – Man Parrish / "Boogie Down Dub" / "Walking On Sunshine" (Acappella) – Rockers Revenge
16. "Apache" – Michael Viner's Incredible Bongo Band
17. "Know How" – Young MC
18. "Do Your Thing" – Charles Wright & the Watts 103rd Street Rhythm Band
19. "Home Shopping" – Bobby Trafalgar
