= Kaleidoscope (DJ Food album) =

Studio album by DJ Food
- Released: April 2000
- Length: 64:35
- Label: Ninja Tune
- Producers: Strictly Kev; PC

DJ Food chronology
A Recipe for Disaster (1995)	Kaleidoscope (2000)	The Search Engine (2012)

Kaleidoscope is a studio album by DJ Food, a collaborative project between Strictly Kev and PC. It was released in April 2000 through Ninja Tune.

== Background ==
DJ Food originally started as a collaborative project between the Coldcut duo Matt Black and Jonathan More. They were subsequently joined by Kevin Foakes, also known as Strictly Kev, and Patrick Carpenter, also known as PC. Kaleidoscope is DJ Food's second studio album, following A Recipe for Disaster (1995). At that time, DJ Food consisted of PC and Strictly Kev.

== Release ==
Kaleidoscope was released in April 2000 through Ninja Tune. On 16 July 2021, the album was reissued in an expanded edition, with a companion album called Kaleidoscope Companion. All tracks on the companion album were recorded around the time of the original Kaleidoscope sessions.

== Critical reception ==
Professional ratings
Review scores
Source	Rating
AllMusic	4.5/5 stars
Pitchfork	9.3/10

Taylor M. Clark of Pitchfork wrote, "DJ Food adhere to no specific genre on Kaleidoscope, dividing the disc nearly equally between derivations of cool and electric jazz and classical music. " He added, "Kaleidoscope does not overpower, but seduces the listener with its subtle blends of percussion and tastefully chosen melodies and backgrounds." Enrique Lavin of CMJ New Music Report stated, "Multicolored rhythms lain over a jazz platter and accompanied by choice samples and ambient embellishments make Kaleidoscope a groove lovers' feast."

== Track listing ==
Kaleidoscope track listing
No.	Title	Writer(s)	Length
1.	"Full Bleed"	K. Brown; Foakes	6:02
2.	"Cookin'"	Carpenter	3:43
3.	"Break"	Carpenter; Jalal Nuriddin	2:20
4.	"The Riff"	Foakes; Jones	4:12
5.	"The Ageing Young Rebel" (featuring Ken Nordine)	Nordine; Carpenter; Foakes	6:03
6.	"The Crow..."	Carpenter	6:13
7.	"Nocturne (Sleep Dyad 1)"	Foakes; Moore	7:16
8.	"Nevermore (Sleep Dyad 2)"	Foakes	8:38
9.	"The Sky at Night"	Carpenter	5:14
10.	"...You"	Foakes	2:46
11.	"Minitoka"	Carpenter	9:24
12.	"Reprise (A Splash of Debussy)"	Carpenter	1:08
Total length:			64:35

Notes

- "Reprise (A Splash of Debussy)" is an extra track on the CD version and the digital version.

== Personnel ==
Credits adapted from liner notes.

- Strictly Kev – production, photography
- PC – production
- Bundy K. Brown – additional programming (1), additional mixing (1)
- Ken Nordine – vocals (5)
- Jamie Tilly – bass guitar (7)
- Ali Tod – mixing assistance
- Sandra Cole – photography
- Alice Ceresole – photography
- Openmind – design

== Charts ==
Chart performance for Kaleidoscope
Chart (2000)	Peak position
UK Independent Albums (Official Charts)	36

Chart performance for Kaleidoscope
Chart (2025)	Peak position
UK Dance Albums (Official Charts)	12
