= The Search Engine =

Studio album by DJ Food
- Released: 23 January 2012
- Length: 55:24
- Label: Ninja Tune

DJ Food chronology
| Kaleidoscope (2000) | The Search Engine (2012) |

The Search Engine is a studio album by DJ Food, a project of Kevin Foakes who is also known as Strictly Kev. It was released on 23 January 2012 through Ninja Tune. It received generally favorable reviews from critics.

== Background ==
DJ Food originally started as a collaborative project between the Coldcut duo Matt Black and Jonathan More. They were subsequently joined by Kevin Foakes, also known as Strictly Kev, and Patrick Carpenter, also known as PC. Black, More, and Carpenter left the project, and Foakes became a sole member of the project.

The Search Engine is DJ Food's first studio album since Kaleidoscope (2000). It includes tracks from three previously released EPs: One Man's Weird Is Another Man's World (2009), The Shape of Things That Hum (2009), and Magpies, Maps and Moons (2011). It features guest appearances from The The vocalist Matt Johnson (on a cover version of The The's song "Giant") and Foetus' JG Thirlwell (on "Prey").

The album's cover art is an illustration by the comic book artist Henry Flint. Kevin Foakes asked him to draw "a cosmonaut, hanging in space, strapped into an unfeasibly large backpack, the kind you could only wear in zero gravity."

The album was released on 23 January 2012 through Ninja Tune. A limited edition of the album comes with a comic-sized booklet, a CD, and a 7-inch flexi-disc.

== Critical reception ==
Professional ratings
Aggregate scores
| Source | Rating |
|---|---|
| Metacritic | 69/100 |
Review scores
| Source | Rating |
| AllMusic | 4.5/5 stars |
| Clash | 5/10 |
| MusicOMH | 4/5 stars |
| PopMatters | 6/10 |
| Record Collector | 4/5 stars |
| The Skinny | 2/5 stars |
| Spin | 4/10 |

According to the review aggregator Metacritic, The Search Engine received "generally favorable reviews" based on a weighted average score of 69 out of 100 from 7 critic scores.

John Bergstrom of PopMatters stated, "Though the interludes have been added to help smooth things out, the album still comes across as a hodgepodge, albeit a pretty good one." He added, "If you have enjoyed previous DJ Food or Ninja Tune releases, The Search Engine has plenty of elements that will sound comfortingly familiar, if not exactly fresh at this stage." Alan Ranta of Exclaim! commented that "The style is mature, intensely smoky and cinematic, recalling trip-hop, gamelan, vintage propaganda, film noir, sci-fi and stag films." Phil Freeman of AllMusic wrote, "Surprising as it may be, coming from masters of the quick-cut DJ collage, The Search Engine is a journey worth taking from beginning to end, uninterrupted." Meanwhile, Will Salmon of Clash called it "a tired, conservative and weirdly insular album."

== Track listing ==
The Search Engine track listing
| No. | Title | Writer(s) | Length |
|---|---|---|---|
| 1. | "All Covered in Darkness Pt. 1" | K. Foakes; K. Nordine; D. Dragon | 4:23 |
| 2. | "Giant" (featuring Matt Johnson) | M. Johnson | 8:30 |
| 3. | "Intermission: A New Language" | P. Carpenter | 0:59 |
| 4. | "The Illectrik Hoax" (featuring Natural Self) | K. Foakes; N. Pearn; Ashton; Stansfield; Kaffinetti; Gould | 3:42 |
| 5. | "Sentinel (Shadow Guard)" (featuring DK) | K. Foakes; D. Knott | 3:26 |
| 6. | "Prey" (featuring JG Thirlwell) | K. Foakes; JG Thirlwell | 4:04 |
| 7. | "In Orbit Every Monday" | K. Foakes | 2:57 |
| 8. | "Outermission: Sheer Fiction" | K. Foakes | 0:52 |
| 9. | "Percussion Map Pt. 1" | K. Foakes | 3:18 |
| 10. | "Magpie Music" (featuring 2econd Class Citizen) | K. Foakes; A. Thomason | 11:18 |
| 11. | "A Trick of the Ear" | K. Foakes | 9:02 |
| 12. | "Colours Beyond Colours" | K. Foakes | 2:53 |
| Total length: | | | 55:24 |

== Personnel ==
Credits adapted from liner notes.

- Strictly Kev – music, mixing (7, 10)
- Dr Rubberfunk – drums (1)
- Jeff Knowler – remixing (1, 4), mixing (2, 5, 6, 9, 10), slide guitar (2)
- Mike Pelanconi – remixing (1, 4)
- Matt Johnson – guest appearance (2)
- Mr. P – remixing (3)
- Natural Self – guest appearance (4)
- DK – guest appearance (5)
- King Cannibal – mixing (5)
- JG Thirlwell – guest appearance (6)
- 2econd Class Citizen – guest appearance (10), mixing (10)
- Bundy K. Brown – mixing (11)
- Jon Reynolds – mixing (12)
- Kevin Metcalfe – mastering
- Openmind – design
- Henry Flint – illustration
- Will Cooper-Mitchell – photography
