= People Hold On =

1989 single by Coldcut

- One of European variants of standard edition

Single by Coldcut featuring Lisa Stansfield

from the album What's That Noise?
- B-side: "Yes, Yes, Yes"
- Released: 13 March 1989
- Genre: Acid house; diva house
- Length: 3:58
- Label: Ahead of Our Time
- Songwriters: Matt Black; Jonathan More; Lisa Stansfield
- Producer: Coldcut

Coldcut singles chronology
"Stop This Crazy Thing" (1988)	"People Hold On" (1989)	"My Telephone" (1989)

Lisa Stansfield singles chronology
"I Got a Feeling" (1983)	"People Hold On" (1989)	"My Telephone" (1989)

Music video
- "People Hold On" on YouTube

"People Hold On" is a song by British band Coldcut and singer-songwriter Lisa Stansfield, released as the first single from the band's debut album, What's That Noise? (1989). It was written by Matt Black, Jonathan More and Stansfield, and produced by Coldcut. The song received positive reviews from music critics and became a commercial success. It was released as a single on 13 March 1989 by label Ahead of Our Time and reached number 11 on the UK Singles Chart and number six on the US Billboard's Dance Club Play chart. The song was remixed by Blaze, Juan Atkins, Dimitri from Paris, Mark Saunders, Eric Kupper, Tyrone Perkins and Masters at Work. A music video was produced to promote the single, directed by Big TV!.

In 2003, "People Hold On" was included on Stansfield's compilation, Biography: The Greatest Hits. In 2006, the Casuals Remix by Ceri Evans was included on Coldcut's album, Sound Mirrors (Videos & Remixes). In 2014, the Full Length Disco Mix of "People Hold On" was included on Stansfield's People Hold On ... The Remix Anthology (also on The Collection 1989–2003).

== Critical reception ==
In a retrospective review, Matthew Hocter from Albumism described "People Hold On" as "an innovative dance track". Bill Coleman from Billboard felt it "deserves to be a multiformat smash. Positive lyrics, killer R&B/dance rhythm, and a stellar performance from Blue Zone U.K. vocalist Stansfield merits immediate attention if you're not already hip." He concluded, "From the forthcoming album What's That Noise?, expect this retro-sounding track to be a fave all summer long. Wonderful." Greg Kot from Chicago Tribune remarked Stansfield's "elastic" voice. Tom Ewing of Freaky Trigger complimented her "as a house vocalist". He added, "Lisa Stansfield was a terrific find: she could play the belter with the best of them, but also provide a calm centre for Coldcut's gleeful cut-and-mix pyrotechnics and pianos. Best of all, she sounded like she was having a tremendous time."

A reviewer from Music & Media said, "An effective mixture of Stansfield's soul voice and a rare groove/house backing. Great dance track with a strong melody." Jerry Smith from Music Week named it "unforgettable". David Quantick from NME wrote, "Their 'People Hold On' is one of the best things done by either Coldcut or Stansfield, a chargingly daft love 'n' peace nonsense anthem that was really a call for drug-addled copulation. Most importantly for Stansfield, it emphasised a '70s soul stance that suited her voice." Edward Hill from The Plain Dealer praised the song as "fabulous". Marisa Fox from Spin complimented it as a "catchy hit". Joe Brown from The Washington Post described it as "propulsive".

== Chart performance ==
"People Hold On" peaked within the top 20 in the United Kingdom, where it reached number 11 on 9 April 1989, during its fourth week on the UK Singles Chart. Additionally, the song was a top-30 hit in West Germany, a top-40 hit in Belgium and the Netherlands, and a top-50 hit in France. On the Eurochart Hot 100, "People Hold On" reached number 26 in April 1989. Outside Europe, it peaked at number six on the US Billboard Dance Club Play chart. In Oceania, it reached numbers 37 and 78 in New Zealand and Australia, respectively. In West Asia, it became a successful top-five hit in Israel, peaking at number four in its third week on the chart, on 30 April 1989.

== Music video ==
The accompanying music video for "People Hold On" was directed by Big TV!. In the video, Stansfield, Coldcut and some dancers performs in front of a purple backdrop. Other times Stansfield performs towards a black background or in front of a fountain. She wears a black/red outfit, red lipstick and her characteristically kiss curls. In between there are technically aquipments, as keyboards, paraboles, radios and speakers, floating in the air.

== Impact and legacy ==
British music publication Fact ranked "People Hold On" number 11 in their list of "21 Diva-House Belters That Still Sound Incredible" in 2014, writing:

Yeah it's cheesy and loved up and utopian – and what? It really hit the spot back then, find yourself in the right situation now and it still does. Also the a cappella has found its way over so many different beats in bootlegs and DJ sets over the years, this track is woven into the very fabric of things.

Electronic dance and clubbing magazine Mixmag ranked it as one of the 20 best songs in their "The 20 Best Diva House Tracks" list in 2019, adding:

The tune put the pair on the map and influential producers like Juan Atkins, Dimitri from Paris and Masters at Work, took notice of the UK duo's talent and each took shots at remixing the track. It's a clean and powerful dance track with a strong melody that marked the beginning of Coldcut's iconic career.

== Track listings ==
- Australian and European 7-inch single
1. "People Hold On" – 3:58
2. "Yes, Yes, Yes" – 3:33
- Australian and European CD single
1. "People Hold On" – 3:58
2. "People Hold On" (Full Length Disco Mix) – 9:24
3. "Yes, Yes, Yes" – 5:40
- Australian and European 12-inch single
1. "People Hold On" (Full Length Disco Mix) – 9:24
2. "Yes, Yes, Yes" (Hedmaster Mix) – 5:40
- European 12-inch single (The Blaze Mix)
1. "People Hold On" (New Jersey Jazz Mix) – 8:49
2. "People Hold On" (Speng Mix) – 6:34
3. "People Hold On" (A Capella) – 2:08
4. "Yes, Yes, Yes" – 5:40
- US 12-inch single
1. "People Hold On" (Full Length Disco Mix) – 9:24
2. "People Hold On" (Speng Mix) – 6:34
3. "People Hold On" (Radio Mix) – 3:58
4. "People Hold On" (New Jersey Jazz Mix) – 8:49
5. "People Hold On" (A Capella) – 2:08
- US 12-inch single (Limited Edition)
1. "People Hold On" (NYC Club Mix) – 7:58
2. "People Hold On" (Dirty Piano Mix) – 5:33
3. "People Hold On" (Perk-Appella Mix) – 6:21
4. "People Hold On" (Radio Mix) – 3:58
5. "People Hold On" (NYC Club Edit) – 4:33
6. "People Hold On" (R.E.T.T. Dub) – 8:07
- US 12-inch single (Masters at Work Mixes)
1. "People Hold On" (MAW Mix 1)
2. "People Hold On" (MAW Mix 2)
3. "People Hold On" (MAW Mix 3)
4. "People Hold On" (MAW Mix 4)

== Charts ==
Weekly chart performance for "People Hold On"
Chart (1989)	Peak position
Australia (ARIA)	78
Belgium (Ultratop 50 Flanders)	32
Europe (Eurochart Hot 100)	26
France (SNEP)	45
Israel (Israeli Singles Chart)	4
Italy Airplay (Music & Media)	12
Luxembourg (Radio Luxembourg)	12
Netherlands (Dutch Top 40 Tipparade)	4
Netherlands (Single Top 100)	37
New Zealand (Recorded Music NZ)	38
UK Singles (Official Charts)	11
US Dance Club Songs (Billboard)	6
US Dance Singles Sales (Billboard)	26
West Germany (GfK)	24

== "People Hold On" (The Bootleg Mixes) ==
"People Hold On (The Bootleg Mixes)"

Single by Lisa Stansfield vs the Dirty Rotten Scoundrels

from the album Lisa Stansfield
- Released: 6 January 1997
- Genre: Dance
- Length: 3:42
- Label: Arista
- Songwriters: Matt Black; Jonathan More; Lisa Stansfield
- Producer: The Dirty Rotten Scoundrels

Lisa Stansfield singles chronology
"Dream Away" (1994)	"People Hold On (The Bootleg Mixes)" (1997)	"The Real Thing" (1997)

Music video
- "People Hold On" (The Bootleg Mixes) on YouTube

In 1996, "People Hold On" was remixed by British producers Dan Bewick and Matt Frost as the Dirty Rotten Scoundrels. The CD single with these Bootleg Mixes was released on 6 January 1997 and charted higher than the original version of the song in 1989, peaking at number four on the UK Singles Chart and topping the UK Dance Singles Chart as well as the US Billboard Dance Club Play chart. The Dirty Rotten Scoundrels took their cue from Armand Van Helden's radical reworking of Tori Amos' "Professional Widow", which topped the UK chart the week that the bootleg mixes debuted.

Because of this success, "People Hold On" (Bootleg Mix) was included on Stansfield's eponymous album (1997) as a bonus track. The music video, directed by Max Abbiss-Biro, does not include any new footage of Stansfield but uses small fragments taken from "Change" and "Someday (I'm Coming Back)" videos. Later, "People Hold On" (Dirty Rotten Scoundrels Mix) was also featured on The Remix Album (1998) and a limited edition of Biography: The Greatest Hits (2003). On 24 October 2006, Dance Vault Mixes of "People Hold On" were released digitally. In 2014, Jon Is the Don Mix of "People Hold On" was included on the deluxe 2CD + DVD re-release of Lisa Stansfield (also on The Collection 1989–2003).

=== Critical reception ===
Scottish Aberdeen Press and Journal wrote, "This bootleg is only going to be available for one week at the start of the New Year and can be expected to do big things. Bearing an uncanny resemblance to Armand Van Helden's remix of Tori Amos' excellent 'Professional Widow', except featuring vocals from Lisa's classic". The newspaper added that "the rush to get a copy will probably see it in the Top Ten. Not bad at all, even if a tad unoriginal."

=== Track listings ===
- European CD single
1. "People Hold On" (Dirty Radio Mix) – 3:42
2. "People Hold On" (Jon Is the Don Mix) – 8:09
- Australian and European CD maxi-single
1. "People Hold On" (Dirty Radio Mix) – 3:42
2. "People Hold On" (Original 7" Version) – 3:58
3. "People Hold On" (Jon Is the Don Mix) – 8:09
4. "People Hold On" (Monjack Dub) – 7:59
5. "People Hold On" (Full Length Disco Mix) – 9:21
- European 12-inch single
1. "People Hold On" (Jon Is the Don Mix) – 8:09
2. "People Hold On" (Original 7" Version) – 3:58
3. "People Hold On" (Monjack Dub) – 7:59
4. "People Hold On" (Full Length Disco Mix) – 9:21
- 2006 US digital Dance Vault mixes
1. "People Hold On" (Dirty Radio Mix) – 3:42
2. "People Hold On" (Original 7" Version) – 3:58
3. "People Hold On" (Jon Is the Don Mix) – 8:09
4. "People Hold On" (Monjack Dub) – 7:59
5. "People Hold On" (Full Length Disco Mix) – 9:21

=== Charts ===
==== Weekly charts ====
Weekly chart performance for "People Hold On" (The Bootleg Mixes)
Chart (1997)	Peak position
Australia (ARIA)	89
Belgium (Ultratop 50 Flanders)	40
Canada Dance/Urban (RPM)	9
Europe (Eurochart Hot 100)	14
Europe Radio Top 50 (Music & Media)	21
Ireland (IRMA)	15
Israel (Israeli Singles Chart)	26
Netherlands (Dutch Top 40 Tipparade)	10
Netherlands (Single Top 100)	71
Scottish Singles Sales (Official Charts)	10
Spain Airplay (Music & Media)	11
Spain Maxi-Singles (AFYVE)	14
UK Singles (Official Charts)	4
UK Dance (Official Charts)	1
US Dance Club Songs (Billboard)	1

==== Year-end charts ====
Year-end chart performance for "People Hold On" (The Bootleg Mixes)
Chart (1997)	Position
UK Singles (OCC)	116
US Dance Club Play (Billboard)	45

=== Certifications ===
Certifications for "People Hold On" (The Bootleg Mixes)
Region	Certification	Certified units/sales
United Kingdom (BPI) Sales since 2005	Silver	200,000^{‡}
^{‡} Sales+streaming figures based on certification alone.

== See also ==
- List of number-one dance singles of 1997 (U.S.)
