= Beats + Pieces =

Single by Coldcut

from the album What's That Noise?
- Released: 1987
- Genre: Industrial hip hop
- Label: Ahead of Our Time
- Songwriter(s): Matthew Cohn, Jonathan More
- Producer(s): Coldcut

Coldcut singles chronology
"Say Kids What Time Is It?" (1987)	"Beats + Pieces" (1987)	"Doctorin' the House" (1988)

"Beats + Pieces" is a single by Coldcut, released in 1987 as the first single from their debut album What's That Noise?.

The song features samples from sources ranging from James Brown, Kurtis Blow and American comedian Flip Wilson.
