= Top Banana (video game) =

1991 video game

- Amiga title screen
- Publisher: Hex
- Composer: Coldcut
- Platforms: Archimedes, Amiga, CDTV, Atari ST
- Release: 1991: Archimedes; 1992: Amiga, ST
- Genre: Platform

Top Banana is a 1991 platform game published by Hex for the Acorn Archimedes, Amiga, Atari ST, and CDTV. The game is about trying to save the planet from environmental threats using love, and in line with the game's environmentalist theme, it was released with recycled cardboard packaging. Top Banana's music was produced by electronic music duo Coldcut, and the game features a techno music video as an introduction. Some reviewers praised Top Banana's techno soundtrack and original environmental plot, while others heavily criticized the game due to its repetitive and difficult gameplay and difficult to parse graphics.

== Plot ==
The planet is threatened by man-made environmental threats - rainforest deforestation, nuclear waste, and climate change. A girl named KT seeks to address the world's environmental issues by spreading love. By stopping threats with love, enemies are transformed into fruit - through these world-saving efforts, KT may gain ultimate wisdom and the title of "Top Banana".

== Gameplay ==
Top Banana is a vertically scrolling platformer with the goal of each level being to reach the top of the level. The player takes the role of KT, and must travel through psychedelic levels while jumping across platforms and throwing hearts to convert planet-damaging enemies into fruit. Enemies include chainsaws, bulldozers, businessmen, and soda cans. The game has a time limit in the form of water that damages the player rising from the bottom of the level over time. Fruit that the player may collect throughout the game awards points, and the player may place in the high score table if enough points are collected.

Top Banana has four stages: the Rain Forest, the Metal-City, the Temple, and the Mind-Scape. Some items have negative effects when walked into and are hazards to be avoided - they cause negative effects such as slowed movement, reversing the game's controls, as well as inverting the colors of the level's graphics for several seconds. Upon taking damage, the player phases through the platforms they are on for several seconds, causing the player to lose progress.

== Development ==
Originally released for the Acorn Archimedes, Top Banana was later ported to Amiga, Atari ST, and CDTV. It was released with recycled cardboard packaging. Many of Top Banana's sprites are taken from videos and television for use in the game, much in the same way audio may be sampled in music, and the game features a techno music video as an introduction. Electronic music duo Coldcut, consisting of Matt Black and Jonathan More, produced the game's music. Chaos theory was used to make the music. Regarding sampling and the future of media, Black said in 1993 that it would be like a "big soup bowl, with everyone dipping in and taking whatever they want". Top Banana's developer & publisher Hex is also known as Hardwire, a company specializing in computer graphics work for music videos. Hex spokesman Robert Pepperell stated in an article in a May 1991 issue of The One that Top Banana was developed because Hex believed "a computer game would be an interesting challenge", and because "Most games look rather sterile. We wanted to do something really different and positive. The technique of video sampling has never been used in a game before. Top Banana really looks and sounds completely different to any other computer game yet written." The game's disk has no copy protection and thus the game's sprites may be edited with graphics software. In 1992 the game was included in Hex's release Global Chaos for CDTV on CD-ROM, alongside remixes of Top Banana's soundtrack.

A single was released to coincide with the release of Global Chaos, and a music video featuring KT promoting the release aired on MTV. The music video was created by Black on a £200 budget using a camcorder, an Acorn Archimedes, a Macintosh, and an Amiga; the Archimedes ran the "processor-intensive routines" such as the video's realtime fractal zoom, the Amiga was used for the majority of the work, including ray tracing and digitized animations, with the Mac "[tying up] loose ends".

Top Banana was playtested in the Netherlands. A demo for Top Banana is featured on Amiga Format issue #32's coverdisk. Playing the Atari ST version on a ST not in the Atari STe model range removes the game's sound, removing music entirely and replacing sound effects with stock sound chip sounds.

Top Banana was included in Superior Software's Archimedes game re-release compilation Play It Again Sam 3, with the games included in the compilation being determined by votes by readers in Acorn User magazine.

== Reception ==
Reception

Review scores
Publication	Score
Datormagazin	75% (Amiga)
GamesMaster	65%
CU Amiga	59% (CDTV)
ST Format	48% (Atari ST)
Amiga Power	45% (Amiga)
Aktueller Software Markt	4/12 (Amiga)
Amiga Joker	16% (Amiga)

Top Banana was unfavorably compared to Rainbow Islands by several critics, with Amiga Power stating that "Rainbow Islands does it all a hundred times better" and CU Amiga calling Top Banana "graphically sickening" and comparing it to "Rainbow Islands with half the features missing".

Amiga Power gave the Amiga version an overall score of 45%, criticizing its gameplay, plot, and graphics, calling the graphics "confusing" and that it's "impossible to see what's going on most of the time". Amiga Power also expressed that there isn't much to do in the game, summarizing its gameplay as "just collecting, shooting, and climbing."

German gaming magazine Amiga Joker gave the Amiga version an overall score of 16%, calling it "ugly", "boring", and "acoustically unbearable" saying that "what you see on your screen will ruin your eyes, destroy your eardrums and kill every last nerve", and concluding that "picking up trash in the park is a more exciting and meaningful environmental game [than Top Banana]."

German gaming magazine Aktueller Software Markt gave the Amiga version an overall score of four out of twelve, giving its sound a score of ten but criticizing its gameplay and graphics. CU Amiga gave the CDTV release of Global Chaos an overall score of 59%, saying that they were disappointed by Global Chaos' music, saying that they were expecting "something special" given Coldcut's involvement.

Swedish gaming magazine Datormagazin gave the Amiga version an overall score of 75% and praised its techno soundtrack and variety in its music, but expressed that differentiating enemies and traps from the background can be difficult, and called the graphics "a bit messy at times", concluding that Top Banana is ""not the best of the best", but still quite original".

British Channel 4 television programme GamesMaster reviewed Top Banana in episode five of season one; the reviewers were contestants on the game show, and gave Top Banana an overall score of 65%. Top Banana was reviewed by three reviewers with differing opinions on the game; one reviewer praised Top Banana's "great" music and "absolutely superb" graphics, while simultaneously calling the game unplayable, while another praised its original environmental plot, but summarized Top Banana as "just another platformer with a beat 'em up in the middle."

A retrospective review in Stuart Ashen's 2017 book Attack of the Flickering Skeletons: More Terrible Old Games You've Probably Never Heard Of describes the game as "a game very much rooted in early ninties rave culture from design to execution". Ashen called it a "badly executed platformer" and called its graphics "an utterly indecipherable, garbled mess".

== See also ==
- Hexstatic
