= Hexstatic =

English electronic music duo

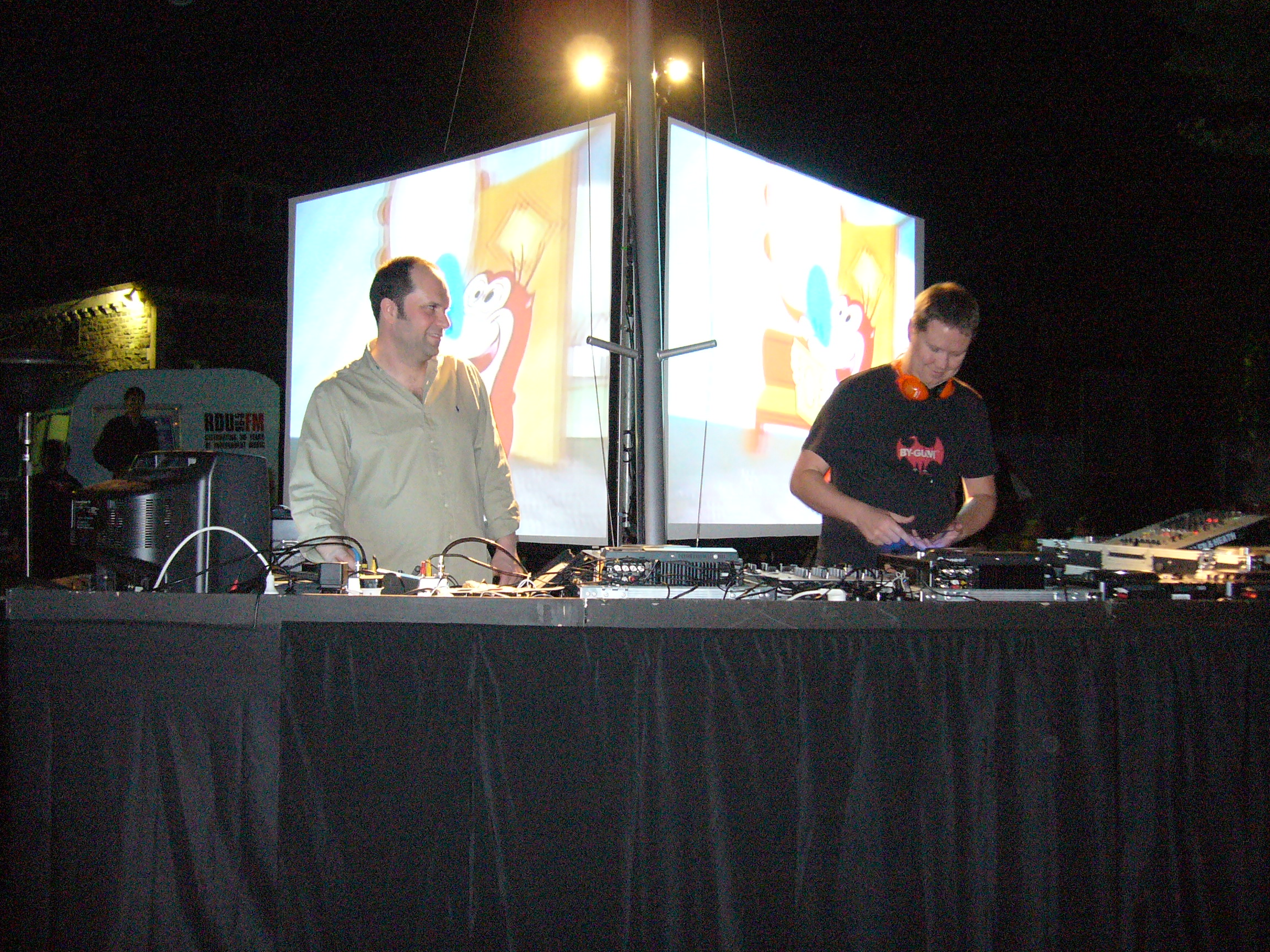
- Hexstatic live in Christchurch, New Zealand, 2006

Background information
- Origin: London, England
- Genres: Electronic; trip hop; house; breakbeat
- Years active: 1997–present
- Labels: Ntone; Ninja Tune
- Members: Stuart Warren Hill; Robin Brunson
- Website: hexstatic.tv

Hexstatic are an English electronic music duo, consisting of Stuart Warren Hill and Robin Brunson, that specializes in creating "quirky audio visual electro." Formed in 1997 after Hill and Brunson met while producing visuals at the Channel 5 launch party, they decided to take over for the original members of the Ninja Tune multimedia collective Hex that had disbanded around the same time. They soon collaborated with Coldcut for the Natural Rhythms Trilogy, including the critically acclaimed A/V single "Timber".

Much of their music involves integrated visual experiences, and both of their main album releases have been CD and DVD combinations; the latest, Master-View, includes 3D "anaglyph" versions of some of their music videos and comes packaged with 3D glasses. Hexstatic has also been instrumental in designing VJ equipment, including the Pioneer DVJ-X1 professional DVD player. Other artists they have worked with include Kris Menace, EBN, Juice Aleem and David Byrne of Talking Heads.

== History ==
The current Hexstatic duo of Stuart Warren Hill and Robin Brunson have been together since 1997. Before that time Stuart Hill had been producing visuals for the Big Chill Festival. and had a visuals company called SP Visuals with Pod Bluman. Brunson had been working in computer animation and producing and DJing for Skint records offshoot Under 5's as Rareforce. Both wanted to combine their video talents with music. They gradually took over for the original Hex group which consisted of graphic design artists Robert Pepperell and Miles Visman and Coldcut members Matt Black and Jonathan More.

=== Hex ===
This first version, known simply as Hex, fused an interest in computer programming and animation with their talent for video design and knowledge of club culture to create a range of multimedia projects. In 1990, they produced music videos for artists such as The Fall and Queen Latifah as well as graphics for television stations. Also that year they created the first pop music video created entirely on home micro computers (Apple Macintosh, Amiga, etc.) for "Coldcut’s Christmas Break." In 1991, they released the video game "Top Banana" along with a 12" single mix of the game's sound track. A year later they included the game along with rave visuals, techno and ambient music all on one CD-ROM billed as a "multi dimensional future entertainment product." The group continued to put out interactive CD-ROM and CD-i titles throughout the mid nineties. During this time they also performed live visuals for clubs and chillouts. Their final contribution came in 1997, when they helped create the CD-ROM version of Coldcut's Let Us Play! album which featured tracks by its own offspring Hexstatic. Hex officially disbanded in 1999 due to internal tensions.

=== Natural rhythms trilogy ===
Prior to meeting Brunson at the Channel 5 launch party in 1997, Stuart Warren Hill had begun working on the Natural Rhythms Trilogy, a collaborative effort with Coldcut and Greenpeace. Stuart approached Greenpeace asking for use of their stock footage of wildlife and logging operations and in return Greenpeace could use the finished project in their campaigns and presentations. The first video was 1997's Frog Jam, which created a rhythmic structure out of short clips of water dripping, frog leaping and tribal drumming and chanting. This was soon followed by Natural Rhythm and Timber. Natural Rhythm featured insects, birds and other wildlife as well as a tribesman playing a flute like instrument. Each video employed increasingly more complex mixing and splicing techniques culminating with the award-winning Timber. Its tone is more plaintively political, opening with majestic images of the sunset over a forest of immensely beautiful trees then quickly shifting with a clap of thunder to a telegraph button punching out the dots and dashes of a Morse code SOS distress call. Images of powerful circular saws, chopping axes, and huge, buzzing chainsaws soon follow. The picture then distorts and images of the indigenous animals appear to the singing of a mournful native woman. The anti-deforestation message is quite clear even before the industrial machinery makes its appearance towards the end of the track. Timber won the award for Best Editing Video Musique in France in 1998 and appeared on Coldcut's 1997 release Let Us Play!.

=== Studio releases and advancement of the AV genre ===
Hexstatic released their first full-length CD in 2000. Entitled Rewind, it was packaged with a 2nd CD-ROM disc that contained videos for each of the album's 11 tracks. The music is similar to Coldcut and has an electro infused sound that reviewer Bob Bannister terms a combination of "South Bronx hip hop [and] the avant-Eurodisco sound of Kraftwerk." The album was created over a two-year period on two 100 MHz Macs that were barely switched off during the production; one 30-second siren sound at the beginning of the track "Machine Toy", took three days to render. For the video track "Deadly Media", Stuart Warren Hill recorded news broadcasts from around the world off of a satellite feed and cropped everything but the newscasters’ mouths to build a random cacophony of voices out of which the spliced-together phase "deadly media" emerges.

Solid Steel Presents Hexstatic - Listen and Learn was their next project. Released in 2003, it was a mix album produced by Robin Brunson of many of the tracks that influenced Hexstatic's own sound. It featured time stretching techniques made possible by the newest CD mixing technology.

In contradiction to many DJ purists who only use vinyl, Hexstatic (and Hex before them) have consistently demonstrated a willingness and even a passion for bleeding edge technologies. In 2004, they consulted with Pioneer on the production of the first DVD turntable with tempo control, the DJV-X1. This machine has the ability to live mix audio and video in the same way one would a simple audio disc.

For Master-View, Hexstatic continued to innovate by creating 3D anaglyph videos for six of the tracks on the DVD portion of the CD/DVD combo release. The single, "Salvador", which features footage of people dancing in the streets of Salvador, Brazil, was voted Best Music Video for 2004 at the Portobello Film Festival.

The band's involvement with current technological development has not lessened its infatuation with older technologies. As can be seen from the Speak & Spell game on the cover of Listen & Learn, the Sinclair ZX80 home computer on Rewind and the View-Master on Master-View, Hexstatic clearly have a penchant for gadgets from the 1970s and 1980s. They have stated that the vector graphics they have used in some of their videos were inspired by the arcade game Battlezone. The samples and computerized vocals of tracks such as "Telemetron" and "Bass Invader" (a play on the Space Invaders game) as well as the use of an Atari 2600 and a Casio V-L Tone on L-Virata, are also signifers of the retro tech aesthetic they cultivate.

A mix CD Pick'n'Mix: An Assortment To Suit All Tastes was released in April 2006. Sanctuary Records gave Robin Brunson access to its large back catalogue of works, resulting in an eclectic mix of hip hop, rock and reggae from artists as diverse as Grandmaster Flash, The Kinks and the Harry J Allstars.

Hexstatic also released a bootleg CD/DVD set under the alias Exactshit (an anagram of Hexstatic). Featuring samples of popular hit songs, only 200 copies were made available at the Big Chill Music Festival 2003 and from the Ninja Tune online store. It has since been more broadly distributed through online file sharing.

When Robots Go Bad was their next studio album and saw the duo pursue a more pop-electro sound that featured several vocalists including London based soul singer Sabirajade and Australian singer/rapper B+. It was released in 2007.

Hexstatic presents Videos, Remixes and Rarities, 2008, was a DVD and CD combo celebrating 10 years of the duos video and audio work. The DVD featured all of their best videos, some previously not available on DVD. The CD featured rare and unreleased tracks and remixes by Hexstatic.

Hexstatic present Trailer Trax was a solo digital release by Robin Brunson and was given away for free via Bandcamp in Dec 2010.

Holotronica is Stuart Warren-Hill's solo AV 3D project. The album was released August 2014, a visual collaboration with Tom Wall of Blinkin Lab. Stuart then needed a way to show 3D visuals to a large audience when performing his album live. After considering the Pepper's Ghost technique, he soon realised this was not a touring solution. Stuart then invented Holo-Gauze. A patented technology for holographic effects that supports stereoscopic 3D. The only gauze that can do this it is also ultra fine and highly reflective giving good screen gain and contrast and becoming invisible to the audience when correctly setup. Holotronica is now based in Bristol and supplying Holo-Gauze, holographic solutions, bespoke 3D content and visuals all over the world and can list clients such as Lady Gaga, Beyonce, Samsung and Eric Prydz.

=== Live performances ===
Since their art crosses a lot of boundaries they have performed at art galleries and cinemas as well as festivals and smaller clubs. After viewing Timber, David Byrne asked Hexstatic to do the visuals for his performance at the 1998 Lisbon Expo. Since then they performed the first ever live AV gig at the Guggenheim in Bilbao as well as at the Pompidou Centre in Paris and the Getty Museum in Los Angeles. In September 2005, they projected video on a huge water screen over the River Thames in London as part of the Thames Festival. They also have performed at the huge Electraglide raves in Japan before 10,000 people.

They completed the world's first audio-visual album which was previewed at the onedotzero festival in London at the ICA. since then they have had a strong relationship and featured in many of the organisations events at home and abroad including Tokyo, Taipei and Stockholm.

Notably, they performed a series of unlicensed "guerrilla gigs" in the streets of London on 10 March 2006 as part of promoting their single "Distorted Minds". They loaded up their equipment in a van and performed a 30-minute set projected on the wall of a local building in each of three sites that they had previously scouted out. The crowds of a couple hundred people each were generally well behaved and the brevity of the performances meant that Hexstatic were on their way to the next location before the police arrived. They escaped with only a single parking ticket.

== Awards ==
- Best Editing Video Musique Awards, France 1998 "Timber" (with Coldcut)
- Portabello Film Festival, Best Music Video 2004 "Salvador"
- No.1 in Top 20 VJ vote DJ Magazine, October 2005
- Focal Awards 2008 - Award for Best Use of Footage in an Advertisement - Diesel 78: "Learn Disco Dance" -

== Discography ==
=== LPs ===
- Rewind (22 August 2000) Ntone
- Solid Steel Presents Hexstatic - Listen & Learn (11 February 2003) Ninja Tune (DJ mix album)
- Master-View (11 October 2004) Ninja Tune
- Pick'n'Mix: An Assortment To Suit All Tastes (24 April 2006) Castle/Discotheque Sanctuary Records (DJ mix album)
- When Robots Go Bad (25 June 2007) Ninja Tune
- Hexstatic presents Videos, Remixes, Rarities (Dec, 2008) Ninja Tune
- Hexstatic present Trailer Trax (May, 2010) Lower Level

=== Singles and EPs ===
- "Timber" (January 1998) Ninja Tune (12" - 5 audio tracks) (CD-Enhanced - 7 audio tracks + 5 videos)
- "Vector EP" (June 2000) Ntone (12" - 4 audio tracks)
- "Ninja Tune EP" (2000) Ntone (12" - 5 audio tracks)
- "Telemetron (Solid Steel Promo)" (March 2003) Ninja Tune (10" - 4 audio tracks)
- "Salvador" (2004) Ninja Tune (DVD - 3 tracks) (12" - 4 audio tracks)
- "Distorted Minds" (14 March 2005) Ninja Tune (CD-Enhanced - 5 audio tracks + 3 videos) (12" - 4 audio tracks)
- "Red Laser Beam" (2007) Ninja Tune (CD-4 audio tracks) (12" - 4 audio tracks)

=== 'Exactshit' bootlegs ===
- Exactshit CD (2003) No Label (CDR - 16 audio tracks)
- Exactshit DVD (2003) No Label (DVD - 10 video tracks)
- Now That's What I Call Exactshit DVD 2 (2006) No Label (DVD - 16 video tracks)
