= Master-View =

Studio album by Hexstatic
- Released: 18 October 2004
- Label: Ninja Tune; ZEN92 (LP); ZENCD92 (CD)

Hexstatic chronology
Listen & Learn (2003)	Master-View (2004)	Pick'n'Mix: An Assortment To Suit All Tastes (2006)

Professional ratings
Review scores
Source	Rating
Allmusic	link

Master-View is the second studio album by Hexstatic. The CD version of the album includes 2 discs - a CD and a DVD. The songs, "Chase Me" and "L-Virata" was used in Tiger Woods PGA Tour 07. "Living Stereo" was used in a Cartoon Network bumper. Chase Me was also used on UEFA Champions League 2004-2005

== Track listing ==
1. "Extra Life"
2. "Chase Me"
3. "Telemetron"
4. "L-Virata"
5. "Perfect Bird"
6. "Salvador"
7. "Living"
8. "Distorted Minds"
9. "That Track"
10. "Toys Are Us"
11. "Pulse"

== DVD track listing ==
The DVD that accompanied the CD album contained the following tracks. A pair of 3-D film glasses were also included in the packaging for use with the 3D videos (tracks 13 - 18):

1. Extra Life (2D video)
2. Chase Me (2D video)
3. Telemetron (2D video)
4. L-Virata (2D video)
5. Perfect Bird (2D video)
6. Perfect Bird (Astroboy version) (2D video)
7. Salvador (2D video)
8. Living Stereo (2D video)
9. Distorted Minds (2D video)
10. That Track (2D video)
11. Toys Are Us (2D video)
12. Pulse (2D video)
13. Telemetron (3D video)
14. Salvador (3D video)
15. Living Stereo (3D video)
16. Distorted Minds (3D video)
17. That Track (3D video)
18. Pulse (3D video)
19. Extra Life (DVD audio)
20. Chase Me (DVD audio)
21. Telemetron (DVD audio)
22. L-Virata (DVD audio)
23. Perfect Bird (DVD audio)
24. Perfect Bird (Astroboy version) (DVD audio)
25. Salvador (DVD audio)
26. Living (DVD audio)
27. Living Stereo (DVD audio)
28. Living Stereo Eclectic Method remix (DVD audio)
29. Distorted Minds (DVD audio)
30. That Track (DVD audio)
31. That Track instrumental (DVD audio)
32. Toys Are Us (DVD audio)
33. Pulse (video mix) (DVD audio)
34. Pulse (CD mix) (DVD audio)
35. Master Mix (mix of the 2D videos listed above)

The DVD also contains the 3D version of the track "Deadly Media" from the previous album Rewind. It can only be viewed by directly accessing track 22 on the DVD using the DVD player's remote control.
