= Man in a Garage =

Single by Coldcut

from the album Sound Mirrors
- Released: 2006
- Genre: House, hip hop
- Label: Ahead of Our Time
- Songwriter(s): Matthew Cohn, Jonathan More, John Matthias
- Producer(s): Coldcut

Coldcut singles chronology
"Everything Is Under Control" (2005)	"Man in a Garage" (2006)	"True Skool" (2006)

"Man in a Garage" is a single by Coldcut, released in 2006 as the second single from the album Sound Mirrors. It features John Matthias on lead vocals.

In 2013, a remix of this by Nick Franglen of Lemon Jelly was used in an advert for the Ford Fiesta.
