= Keleketla! =

Studio album by Keleketla!
- Released: 3 July 2020
- Studio: Trackside Creative Studios, Soweto, South Africa; Denmark Street Studios, London, England; Assault and Battery Studios, London, England
- Genre: World music; electronic music; gqom; afrobeat
- Length: 1:07:59
- Label: Ahead of Our Time
- Producer: Coldcut

Coldcut chronology
| Outside the Echo Chamber (2017) | Keleketla! (2020) |

Singles from Keleketla!
- 1. "Future Toyi Toyi" Released: 21 May 2020; 2. "International Love Affair" Released: 11 June 2020

Keleketla! is the self-titled studio album by British/South African musical project brought together by Johannesburg's Keleketla! Library founders Rangoato Hlasane and Malose Malahlela and English electronic music duo Coldcut. The album's title means "response" in the Sepedi language. It was released on 3 July 2020 via Ahead Of Our Time. Recording sessions took place at Trackside Creative Studios in Soweto, at Denmark Street Studios and at Assault and Battery Studios in London.

== Critical reception ==
Professional ratings
Aggregate scores
| Source | Rating |
|---|---|
| AnyDecentMusic? | 7.7/10 |
| Metacritic | 81/100 |
Review scores
| Source | Rating |
| AllMusic | 4/5 stars |
| Exclaim! | 8/10 |
| Loud and Quiet | 8/10 |
| musicOMH | 4/5 stars |
| PopMatters | 9/10 stars |
| The Guardian | 4/5 stars |

Keleketla! was met with generally positive reviews. At Metacritic, which assigns a normalized rating out of 100 to reviews from professional critics, the album received an average score of 81, based on nine reviews. The aggregator AnyDecentMusic? has the critical consensus of the album at a 7.7 out of 10.

Adriane Pontecorvo of PopMatters praised the album saying, "Consistently exciting, always surprising, and full of soul, it is undoubtedly one of the most remarkable releases of the year to date". AllMusic's Paul Simpson stated, "Keleketla! is a powerful combination of activism and musical exploration, bonding the sounds of several locations and eras in order to express messages of joy, optimism, and revolution". Safiya Hopfe of Exclaim! said, "With contributions from over 20 artists, including such musical giants as Tony Allen and Thabang Tabana, Keleketla! is a collaboration of rare magnitude. It is at once a celebration and a call to action". Jemima Skala of Loud & Quiet said, "Keleketla! breeds an impossibly enticing sense of hope that one day things might be better". Writing for musicOMH, Steven Johnson said, "In short, it’s an album that demonstrates the continuing merit of musical collaboration while also offering a hopeful counterpoint to a world all too often consumed by negativity and strife". The Guardian reviewer Ammar Kalia said, "Here, the component parts of hip-hop, jazz, dub and protest music are pieced together, like the many languages of a diasporic conversation. If the call is for music Keleketla!'s multilingual, effusive response is one worth hearing".

=== Accolades ===
Publications' year-end list appearances for Keleketla!
| Critic/Publication | List | Rank | Ref |
|---|---|---|---|
| PopMatters | The 60 Best Albums of 2020 | 30 | |

== Track listing ==
| No. | Title | Writer(s) | Length |
|---|---|---|---|
| 1. | "Future Toyi Toyi" | Jon More; Matt Black; Tony Allen; DJ Mabheko; Soundz of the South | 4:49 |
| 2. | "International Love Affair" | More; Black; Allen; Gally Ngoveni; Nono Nkoane; Tubatsi Moloi; Thabang Tabane; Sibusile Xaba | 7:17 |
| 3. | "Shepherd Song" | More; Black; Allen; Ngoveni; Nkoane; Moloi; Tabane; Xaba | 8:11 |
| 4. | "Freedom Groove" | More; Black; Allen; Anthony Hamilton | 7:08 |
| 5. | "Crystallise" | More; Black; Yugen Blakrok | 5:17 |
| 6. | "Broken Light" | More; Black; Ngoveni; Nkoane; Moloi; Tabane; Xaba | 6:37 |
| 7. | "5&1" | More; Black; Ngoveni; Nkoane; Moloi; Tabane; Xaba | 4:34 |
| 8. | "Papua Merdeka" | More; Black; Allen; Benny Wenda; Maria Wenda; Koteka Wenda | 6:41 |
| 9. | "Swift Gathering" | More; Black; Joe Armon-Jones | 6:24 |
| 10. | "Future Toyi Toyi" (Edit) | More; Black; Allen; DJ Mabheko; Soundz of the South | 3:28 |
| 11. | "International Love Affair" (Edit) | More; Black; Allen; Ngoveni; Nkoane; Moloi; Tabane; Xaba | 3:40 |
| 12. | "Crystallise" (Edit) | More; Black; Blakrok | 3:46 |
| Total length: | | | 1:07:59 |

Keleketla! – Japanese edition (bonus track)
| No. | Title | Writer(s) | Length |
|---|---|---|---|
| 10. | "Future Toyi Toyi" (Gqom version) | More; Black; Allen; DJ Mabheko; Soundz of the South | 6:14 |
| Total length: | | | 1:13:13 |

== Personnel ==
Coldcut

- Matthew Cohn – backing vocals (tracks: 2, 11), horns arrangement (tracks: 2–4, 11), JammPro MIDI controller (tracks: 5, 9, 12), producer
- Jonathan Richard More – horns arrangement (tracks: 2–4, 11), JammPro MIDI controller (tracks: 5, 9, 12), producer

Vocalists

- Nono Nkoane – vocals (tracks: 2, 3, 6, 7, 11), backing vocals (track 4)
- Tubatsi Moloi – vocals (tracks: 2, 3, 6, 7, 11)
- Thabang Tabane – vocals (tracks: 2, 3, 11)
- Soundz Of The South Collective – vocals (tracks: 1, 10)
- Afla Sackey – backing vocals (tracks: 2, 11)
- Yugen Blakrok – vocals (tracks: 5, 12)
- The Watts Prophets – vocals (track 4)
- Benny Wenda – vocals (track 8)
- The Lani Singers – vocals (track 8)

Instrumentalists

- Tamar Osborn – baritone saxophone (tracks: 2, 4–6, 8, 9, 11, 12), clarinet & bass clarinet (track 9)
- Tony Allen – drums (tracks: 1–4, 8, 10, 11)
- Afla Sackey – percussion (tracks: 1–3, 8, 10, 11), additional percussion (track 6), djembe (track 8)
- Al Riley – percussion (tracks: 1, 2, 10, 11), keyboards (track 4), additional percussion (track 6)
- Ed 'Tenderlonious' Cawthorne – flute (tracks: 1, 2, 6, 10, 11), tin whistle & recorder (tracks: 1, 10)
- Miles James – guitar (tracks: 1, 2, 8, 10, 11)
- Gally Ngoveni – bass (tracks: 2, 3, 6, 7, 11)
- Thabang Tabane – percussion (tracks: 2, 3, 6, 7, 11)
- Shabaka Hutchings – tenor saxophone (tracks: 2, 5, 8, 11, 12)
- Joe Armon-Jones – keyboards (tracks: 3, 4, 7, 9), piano (track 9)
- Martin Perna – horns arrangement (tracks: 2–4, 11)
- Antibalas – horns (tracks: 2–4, 11)
- Sibusile Xaba – guitar (tracks: 2, 3, 7, 11)
- Dele Sosimi – keyboards (tracks: 2, 6, 8, 11)
- Patrick Carpenter – loops & editing (tracks: 2, 11)
- DeeJay Random – scratches (tracks: 5, 12)
- Chris "The Jungle Drummer" Polglase – drums (track 6)
- Tubatsi Moloi – flute (track 7)
- Darren "Sangita" Evans – piano (track 8)
- Eska Mtungwazi – strings (track 9)

Technicals

- Eric Lau – mixing
- Al Riley – engineering, recording, additional mixing
- Andrew Curnow – engineering, recording
- Dion Monti – engineering, recording
- Hugh Fothergill – engineering
- Guy Katsav – engineering
- Matt Colton – mastering

== Charts ==
| Chart (2020) | Peak position |
|---|---|
| UK Independent Albums (OCC) | 38 |
