= My Telephone =

Single by Coldcut featuring Lisa Stansfield

from the album What's That Noise?
- Released: 22 May 1989
- Recorded: 1989
- Genre: Electronic; acid house
- Length: 5:26
- Label: Ahead of Our Time
- Songwriters: Matt Black; Jonathan More; Lisa Stansfield
- Producer: Coldcut

Coldcut singles chronology
"People Hold On" (1989)	"My Telephone" (1989)	"Coldcut's Christmas Break" (1989)

Lisa Stansfield singles chronology
"People Hold On" (1989)	"My Telephone" (1989)	"This Is the Right Time" (1989)

Music video
- "My Telephone" on YouTube

"My Telephone" is a song recorded by British band Coldcut featuring Lisa Stansfield, released as a single from Coldcut's debut album, What's That Noise? (1989). It was written by Matt Black, Jonathan More, Stansfield, Ian Devaney, Andy Morris and Tim Parry, and produced by Coldcut.

The recording provided the basis for the song "Telephone Thing" by post-punk band The Fall, recorded with Coldcut and released in January 1990.

== Critical reception ==
Jerry Smith from Music Week wrote, "Having just had a massive hit with the unforgettable "People Hold On", Coldcut lift another track from their current What's That Noise? LP. It's a more innovative number but still with an irresistible hook in the chorus harmonies and set to give them yet more success."

== Music video ==
A music video was produced to promote the single, directed by Big T.V. It doesn't feature Stansfield.

== Track listings ==
- European 7" single
1. "My Telephone" (Edit) – 3:50
2. "Theme from Evil Eddy" – 3:41
- European CD maxi single
1. "My Telephone" (Edit) – 3:50
2. "My Telephone" (Redial) – 7:20
3. "Theme from Evil Eddy" (Hedmaster Mix) – 7:17
- European 12" single
1. "My Telephone" (Redial) – 7:20
2. "Theme from Evil Eddy" (Hedmaster Mix) – 7:17
- European 12" single (Disconnect Mixes)
1. "My Telephone" (Disconnect Mixes Parts 1–4) – 10:33
2. "Chase from Evil Eddy" – 2:29
3. "My Telephone" (Disconnect Mixes Parts 5–8) – 6:41
- French 12" single
1. "My Telephone" (Redial) – 7:20
2. "People Hold On" (Dimitri Remix) – 6:45

== Charts ==
Chart (1989)	Peak position
UK Singles (OCC)	52
West Germany (Official German Charts)	62
