= James Heather =

Musical artist

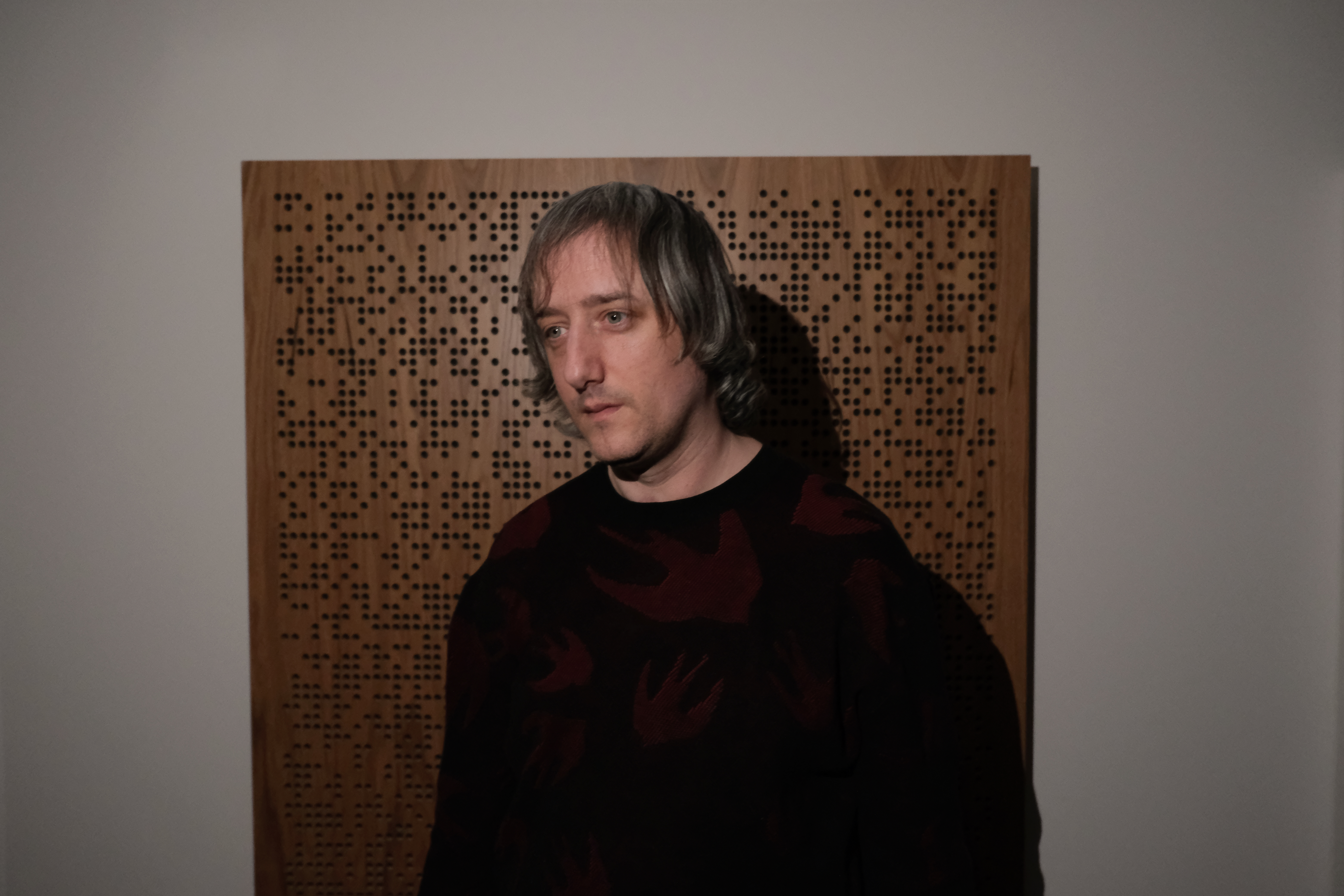
- James Heather

Background information
- Born: Southampton, UK
- Genres: Modern classical, ambient, electronic
- Occupation: Musician
- Instrument: Piano
- Years active: 2017–present
- Label: Ahead of Our Time
- Website: www.jamesheather.com

James Heather (born 16 March 1980) is a British pianist and composer based in London. He releases music on Ninja Tune founders Coldcut's other record label Ahead of Our Time. Heather released his debut album, Stories from Far Away on Piano, on 18 August 2017. Heather followed up with the album Reworks in December 2018. Heather released his second studio album, Invisible Forces, in 2022. As of June 2019, Heather curates and hosts the monthly Moving Sounds radio show on Soho Radio.

His composition style, which Heather calls "Pulse Music", puts his faith in human instinct and fluid dynamics over notation or a metronome dictating what might happen, evolving music through improvisations over time and gradually moulding what will be the final recorded arrangement.

== Early life ==
Heather was born in Southampton. As a child, his grandfather taught him composition and how to manipulate the tuning of piano strings, whilst his grandmother on the other side used to dabble in improvisations.

At the age of 11 he started writing his own compositions inspired by a love of Ludwig van Beethoven and Claude Debussy, his favorite composers. From his parents' garden he was also able to overhear his older neighbour, who had set up a acid house pirate radio station and this also inspired him in his early compositions.

With this classical and jazz grounding and using the structure, ambience, and melody from electronic and post-rock music, he created a fresh take to solo piano music.

=== Road traffic accident ===
In 2008, Heather nearly died after he was involved in a road traffic accident with a cement mixer while cycling, leaving him in a coma and in intensive care. His finger was skewed in the crash, and he wondered whether he would ever be able to play piano as well again. He remarked at the time that "when I eventually started to recover, I began taking my musical sketches more seriously. I found solitude channeling my feelings into compositions."

In 2023, James Heather worked with the T. S. Eliot Prize winning poet Roger Robinson, alongside Penelope Trappes and Specimens to write Hidden Angel (Hackney Road Studio Session) on the 15th anniversary of the accident, it was a rework of his own solo piano composition Hidden Angel, which was a letter of forgiveness in musical form to the Cement Mixer driver.

== Career ==
Heather has collaborated with Dawn Richard, Mumdance and Roger Robinson (King Midas Sound), played piano on Coldcut's Autumn Leaves track from 2021, did an official rework of Ninja Tune act The Cinematic Orchestra, and played on bills with Laura Marling, Jóhann Jóhannsson and Lubomyr Melnyk. Additionally, he has also played at festivals such as Glastonbury, Wilderness and Seachange among others.

Heather's first release in 2017 was Modulations: EP1, seven tracks written in various headspaces' on Coldcut's Ahead of Our Time label. His debut album in 2017 was Stories from Far Away on Piano. This was a more unified conceptual piece of work and the album concept centered on Heathers interpretations of real-world news stories. The album received reviews from The Line of Best Fit, The Arts Desk, Loud and Quiet, Mixmag, Uncut, Exclaim, Mojo and others. The album reached number 14 in the official Billboard Classical Crossover Albums chart. Heather followed up with the Reworks album in December 2018. The album contained a selection of tracks from Modulations: EP 1 and Stories from Far Away on Piano, and includes reworks by DJ Seinfeld, Mary Lattimore, and Sarah Davachi, and new additional string quartet versions by Heather himself. The album was released on Ninja Tune founders Coldcut's original label, Ahead of Our Time. In May 2019, Heather performed at that year's Green Man in Crickhowell, Wales.

Heather released the EP Modulations: EP2 on 28 May 2021 on Ahead of Our Time. In October 2021, Heather curated a mix called Classical Focus for the BBC. In November 2021, Heather released an EP with Japanese composer Ryuichi Sakamoto. In 2022, Heather released his second album Invisible Forces on the Ahead of Our Time label. The album focuses on becoming aware of invisible forces around everyone. This was to help deepen the understanding of self and a person's connection to the world. The Invisible Forces album was reviewed in Clash, Financial Times, Mojo, Uncut, Electronic Sound and others.

On 9 June 2022, Heather delivered a piano performance, premiered/hosted by Mahogany Sessions, a YouTube channel, combining two songs from his latest album, Invisible Forces, at the nightclub, Printworks warehouse in London, UK.

On 26 October 2022 James Heather was asked to play the Steinway Series at London's Royal Albert Hall.

Invisible Forces was nominated for a Libera Award in the US for Best Classical Record in 2023.

On 29 March 2023, James Heather was invited to contribute to the official Piano Day Compilation Vol.2, set up by Nils Frahm. Heather contributed the track 'Borders' which featured the artist Sinemis.

James Heather released a new collection of reworks on 3 November 2023, for the Reworks: Vol2 album where artists including Mogwai, Voces8, Coldcut, KMRU, Abul Mogard and Nailah Hunter reimagined his work. The live video with Voces8 was chosen as Gramophone Magazines video of the day.

== Discography ==
=== Albums ===
- Stories from Far Away on Piano, 2017
- Reworks, 2018
- Invisible Forces, 2022
- Reworks: Vol2, 2023

=== EPs ===
- Modulations: EP1, 2017
- Modulations: EP2, 2021
