= Sound Mirrors =

Studio album by Coldcut
- Released: January 2006
- Genres: Electronica, hip-hop
- Length: 55:05
- Label: Ninja Tune
- Producer: Coldcut

Coldcut chronology
People Hold On — The Best of Coldcut (2004)	Sound Mirrors (2006)

Professional ratings
Review scores
Source	Rating
AllMusic	link
Okayplayer	link
Pitchfork	6.5/10

Sound Mirrors is the fifth studio album by Coldcut. It was released in January 2006. Four singles were released from the album including the Top 75 hit "True Skool" with Roots Manuva.

== Track listing ==
=== CD ===
1. "Man in a Garage" (feat. John Matthias)
2. "True Skool" (feat. Roots Manuva)
3. "Just for the Kick" (feat. Annette Peacock)
4. "Walk a Mile in My Shoes" (feat. Robert Owens)
5. "Mr Nichols" (feat. Saul Williams)
6. "A Whistle and a Prayer" (feat. Fog)
7. "Everything Is Under Control" (feat. Mike Ladd & Jon Spencer)
8. "Boogieman" (feat. Amiri Baraka)
9. "Aid Dealer" (feat. Soweto Kinch)
10. "This Island Earth" (feat. Mpho Skeef)
11. "Colours the Soul" (feat. Dom Spitzer)
12. "Sound Mirrors"
13. "The State We're In" (feat. Lu Grady) (Japanese bonus track)
14. "Just for the Kick (Version 1)" (Japanese bonus track)

A 2 CD edition features tracks 1–12 shown above on CD 1. The second CD features 3 tracks from 'People Hold On - The Best of Coldcut' and the disc is named 'Coldcut Classic 4 + 1'. CD 2 features the following tracks: 1. Beats + Pieces, 2. Paid in Full (Coldcut Remix - 7 Minutes of Madness) - Eric B + Rakim, 3. Stop this Crazy Thing, 4. Autumn Leaves, 5. Everything is Under Control (Qemists Remix).

=== Vinyl ===
The double vinyl LP has a slightly different track listing as it opens with the then forthcoming singles "True Skool" and "Walk a Mile in My Shoes" with all other tracks appearing in the same order as the CD. While such changes are sometimes made to vinyl versions to ensure sides are of a similar length, this is not the case as the only two tracks that would have been on different sides (i.e. "Just for the Kick" should be on side one and "Walk a Mile in My Shoes" should be on side two) are almost identical in length (both just over five minutes long).

==== Side one ====
1. "True Skool" (feat. Roots Manuva)
2. "Walk a Mile in My Shoes" (feat. Robert Owens)
3. "Man in a Garage" (feat. John Matthias)

==== Side two ====
1. "Just for the Kick" (feat. Annette Peacock)
2. "Mr Nichols" (feat. Saul Williams)
3. "A Whistle and a Prayer" (feat. Fog)

==== Side three ====
1. "Everything Is Under Control" (feat. Mike Ladd & Jon Spencer)
2. "Boogieman" (feat. Amiri Baraka)
3. "Aid Dealer" (feat. Soweto Kinch)

==== Side four ====
1. "This Island Earth" (feat. Mpho Skeef)
2. "Colours the Soul" (feat. Dom Spitzer)
3. "Sound Mirrors"

== Singles ==
Single	Release date	UK Singles Chart
"Everything is Under Control"	14.11.2005	93
"Man in a Garage"	09.01.2006	95
"True Skool"	17.04.2006	61
"Walk a Mile in My Shoes"	14.08.2006	103

== Commercial use ==
- The song "True Skool" was heavily used in the promotion of, and eventually became the main theme for, the video game FIFA Street 2.
- The song "Mr Nichols" has been used as background music for one of the bumps on Adult Swim.
- The track "Sound Mirrors" (Beats Mix) is part of the Sleeping Dogs video game soundtrack.
- The song "Everything is Under Control" is used as a track in Driver: San Francisco.
