= DJ Food =

British electric musician

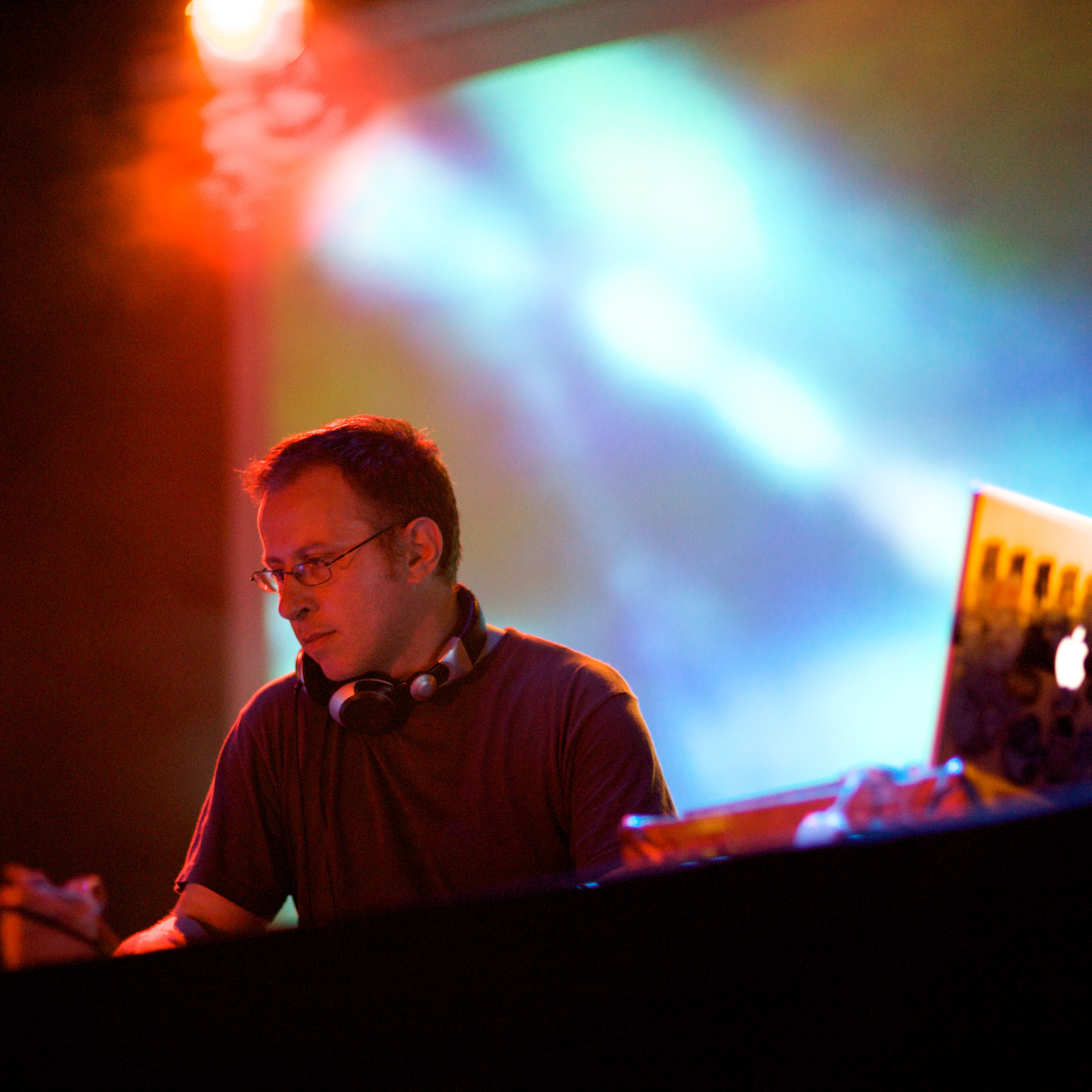
- Strictly Kev as DJ Food at Moldejazz, 2009.

Background information
- Origin: London, England
- Genres: Electronic, IDM, trip hop, breakbeat, downtempo, nu jazz, acid jazz
- Years active: 1992–present
- Label: Ninja Tune
- Members: Strictly Kev
- Past members: Matt Black; Jonathan More; Patrick Carpenter
- Website: www.djfood.org

DJ Food is an electronic music project currently headed by Kevin Foakes (also known as Strictly Kev). It was conceived in 1990 by Jonathan More and Matt Black of Coldcut and the Ninja Tune record label. It has since included various lineups of More, Black, Patrick Carpenter (known as PC), Foakes, and others, before finally being formed only of Foakes.

== History ==
Originally conceived by the members of Coldcut on the Ninja Tune record label, the project started in 1990 on the premise of providing metaphorical "food for DJs". DJ Food released the Jazz Brakes series, with Jazz Brakes Volume 3 being the most successful. The records consisted of collections of breaks, loops and samples that could be used for mixing, remixing and producing.

Later DJ Food albums have developed with shades of Latin, dub, breakbeat, ambient, and drum and bass.

The 1995 album A Recipe for Disaster was a conscious move away from the Jazz Brakes volumes to form more of an identity as an artist, and a remix album of tracks from all six LPs, entitled Refried Food was released the following year. The more recent release, Kaleidoscope (2000), featured guest artists including Bundy K. Brown (formerly of Tortoise, Directions in Music, Pullman) and voiceover artist and jazz poet, Ken Nordine.

== Members ==
DJ Food started as a Coldcut side project from Jonathan More and Matt Black. Along the way they met Patrick Carpenter (known as PC). A loose collaborative team began to form including Paul Brook, Paul Rabiger, Kevin Foakes a.k.a. Strictly Kev and Issac Elliston.

Although keeping their hand in as DJs on the albums, Black and More could not perform DJ sets twice in one night under the aliases of both Coldcut and DJ Food, so they handed the mantle of live performances over to PC and Strictly Kev. Later, PC became so involved with the Cinematic Orchestra that he decided to quit DJ Food, leaving Strictly Kev as the sole director of the project. He has since contributed three remixes to The Shape of Things That Hum EP in 2009.

== Discography ==
=== Albums ===
- Jazz Brakes Vol. 1 (1990)
- Jazz Brakes Vol. 2 (1991)
- Jazz Brakes Vol. 3 (1992)
- Jazz Brakes Vol. 4 (1993)
- Jazz Brakes Vol. 5 (1994)
- A Recipe for Disaster (1995)
- Refried Food (remix album) (1996) – re-released with additional remixes
- Kaleidoscope (2000)
- The Search Engine (2012)
- The Good Food Guide (2012) – compilation
- Citizen Void (2020) – as Celestial Mechanic, with Saron Hughes
- Kaleidoscope Companion (2021, Ahead Of Our Time) – a compilation of versions, alternate mixes, and unreleased ideas from Kaleidoscope, plus the Kaleidoscope LP

=== DJ mix albums ===
- Blech II: Blechsdöttir (1996, Warp) – mixed by PC and Strictly Kev (as Strictly).
- "Sonic Soup" on MLO: Plastic Apple (1996, Aura Surround Sounds) – 56 minute mix by DJ Food as Disc 1 of the three CD set
- Coldcut & DJ Food vs DJ Krush: Cold Krush Cuts (1997, Ninja Tune)
- Solid Steel Presents DJ Food & DK: Now, Listen! (2001, Ninja Tune) – mix album for Ninja Tune's Solid Steel mix series, with producer DK
- Solid Steel Presents DJ Food & DK: Now, Listen Again! (2007, Ninja Tune)
- You Don't Know Ninja Cuts - DJ Food's 1000 Mask Mix (2008, Ninja Tune) – compilation mixed by Strictly Kev

=== Internet only releases ===
- Raiding the 20th Century - Words & Music Expansion (2004, digital self-release on UbuWeb and Ninja Tune limited edition) – a history of cut-up music with Paul Morley as narrator, originally aired in January 2004 on XFM's The Remix
- More Volts: The Funky Eno (2010, digital self-release on SoundCloud) – a mix of Brian Eno tracks
