= When Robots Go Bad =

Studio album by Hexstatic
- Released: June 22, 2007
- Genre: Electronica, trip hop, house
- Length: 50:07
- Label: Ninja Tune; ZEN134 (LP); ZENCD134 (CD)

Hexstatic chronology
Pick'n'Mix: An Assortment To Suit All Tastes (2006)	When Robots Go Bad (2007)

When Robots Go Bad is the third studio album released by Hexstatic. The album features vocals from Ema J, female MC B+, Sabirajade and MC Profisee from Scottish group Scotland Yard MCs and Great Ezcape.

== Track listing ==
1. "Red Laser Beam" (3:28)
2. "Roll Over" (feat. Sabirajade) (5:06)
3. "Tokyo Traffic" (4:20)
4. "Freak Me" (feat. B+) (3:55)
5. "Prom Night Party" (Hexstatic Remix) (4:11)
6. "Tlc" (4:19)
7. "Move On" (feat. Ema J & Profisee) (3:59)
8. "A Different Place" (feat. B+) (3:56)
9. "Subway" (feat. Profisee) (3:23)
10. "Lab Rat Interlude" (2:48)
11. "Newton’s Cradle" (3:48)
12. "Newaves" (3:08)
13. "Bust" (3:46)
