= Doctorin' the House =

Single by Coldcut featuring Yazz and the Plastic Population

from the album What's That Noise?
- Released: February 1988
- Genre: Acid house
- Length: 3:45
- Label: Ahead Of Our Time; Virgin
- Songwriters: Yasmin Evans; Winston Riley; Matthew Cohn; Allan Hedley
- Producer: Coldcut

Coldcut singles chronology
"Beats + Pieces" (1987)	"Doctorin' the House" (1988)	"Stop This Crazy Thing" (1988)

Music video
- "Doctorin' the House" on YouTube

Yazz and the Plastic Population singles chronology
"Doctorin' the House" (1988)	"The Only Way Is Up" (1988)

"Doctorin' the House" is a song by English electronic music duo Coldcut with British singer Yazz, released in February 1988 by Ahead Of Our Time and Virgin as the second single from their debut album, What's That Noise? (1989). The track incorporates samples from various sources, mainly TV and film dialogue. It peaked at number six on the UK Singles Chart in March 1988 and spent four weeks in the top 10, making it Coldcut's biggest UK hit single. It also peaked at number one in Zimbabwe and number three on the US Billboard Hot Dance Club Play chart.

== Critical reception ==
Steve Lamacq from NME wrote, "Squelchy bass rummages around in its footwear looking for wildlife, but finds only a sweetly crisp vocal line, looking imploringly destitute. The lush singing creams off the top layer of jaggedness, defusing the critical edge, but not quite making it a safe bet for easy promotion (radio wise and the like). It may gather a brutal dancefloor efficiency, but the appeal is limited. Off stump at the most." In 2024, Classic Pop ranked "Doctorin' the House" number 14 in their list of "Top 20 80s House Hits".

== Formats and track listings ==
- 7" single
1. "Doctorin' the House" — 3:45
2. "Doctorin' the House" (theftapella) — 4:03
- 12" maxi
1. "Doctorin' the House" (vocal) — 5:38
2. "Doctorin' the House" (speng) — 6:14
- 12" maxi – remixes
1. "Doctorin' the House" (the upset remix) — 6:04
2. "Doctorin' the House" (acid shut up) (dub) — 6:04
3. "Doctorin' the House" (acid shut up) (trak) — 6:04

== Charts ==
=== Weekly charts ===
Chart (1988)	Peak position
Australia (ARIA)	45
Belgium (Ultratop 50)	40
Finland (Suomen virallinen lista)	19
Ireland (IRMA)	16
Netherlands (Dutch Top 40)	26
Netherlands (Single Top 100)	20
New Zealand (RIANZ)	33
UK Singles (OCC)	6
US Hot Dance Club Play (Billboard)	3
West Germany (Media Control Charts)	11
Zimbabwe (ZIMA)	1

=== Year-end charts ===
Chart (1988)	Position
Canada Dance/Urban (RPM)	9
