= What's That Noise? =

Studio album by Coldcut
- Released: April 1989
- Genres: Electronic, house, alternative hip-hop
- Labels: Tommy Boy/Reprise/Warner Bros., 25974 (US), Big Life (UK), Ahead of Our Time (UK)
- Producer: Coldcut

Coldcut chronology
What's That Noise? (1989)	Some Like It Cold (1990)

Singles from What's That Noise?
- 1. "Beats + Pieces" Released: 1987; 2. "Doctorin' the House" Released: 1988; 3. "Stop This Crazy Thing" Released: 1988; 4. "People Hold On" Released: 1989

Professional ratings
Review scores
Source	Rating
AllMusic	3/5 stars
Robert Christgau	B
The Encyclopedia of Popular Music	4/5 stars
The Rolling Stone Album Guide	3.5/5 stars

What's That Noise? is the debut album by Coldcut, released in 1989.

Guests on the album include: Lisa Stansfield on "People Hold On" and "My Telephone", Mark E. Smith (the Fall) on "(I'm) In Deep", Junior Reid on "Stop This Crazy Thing", Queen Latifah on "Smoke 1" and Yazz on "Doctorin' the House".

The album peaked at No. 20 on the UK Albums Chart and at No. 103 on the Australian ARIA chart.

== Critical reception ==
The album was featured in the book 1001 Albums You Must Hear Before You Die.

Trouser Press wrote: "In between the vocal tracks are various 'Beats & Pieces', as one title has it: samples, melodies and grooves that help flesh out What's That Noise?, a patchy but generally rewarding debut." The Stranger called the album a "classic LP [that] married cut-and-paste techniques with old-fashioned songwriting smarts."

== Track listing ==
=== 1989 UK release ===
Side A

1. "People Hold On" (featuring Lisa Stansfield) – 3:58
2. "Fat (Party and Bullshit)" – 4:34
3. "(I'm) in Deep" (featuring Mark E. Smith) – 5:23
4. "My Telephone" (featuring Lisa Stansfield) – 5:26
5. "Theme from "Reportage"" – 1:35
6. "Which Doctor?" – 4:59

Side B

1. "Stop This Crazy Thing" (featuring Junior Reid) – 5:57
2. "No Connection" – 3:34
3. "Smoke 1" – 4:51
4. "Doctorin' the House" (Say R Mix) featuring Yazz – 5:18
5. "What's That Noise?" – 2:56

Some copies also contained a separate bonus 12" with the following tracklisting:

Side 1

1. "Beats & Pieces" (Mo Bass Remix) – 5:55
2. "Stop This Crazy Thing" (Hedmaster Mix) – 7:03

Side 2

1. "Maker Brake"
2. "Greedy's Back"
3. "Drawmasters Squeeze"
4. "Trak 22"

=== 1989 US release ===
1. "People Hold On" (featuring Lisa Stansfield) – 3:58
2. "Fat (Party and Bullshit)" – 4:17
3. "(I'm) in Deep" (featuring Mark E. Smith) – 5:08
4. "My Telephone" (featuring Lisa Stansfield) – 4:54
5. "Theme from "Reportage"" – 1:35
6. "Which Doctor?" – 4:30
7. "Stop This Crazy Thing" (featuring Junior Reid) – 5:15
8. "No Connection" – 3:34
9. "Smoke Dis One" (Featuring Queen Latifah) – 5:40
10. "Not Paid Enough" – 7:23
11. "What's That Noise?" – 2:28
12. "Beats & Pieces" (Mo Bass Remix) – 6:00
13. "Stop This Crazy Thing" (Hedmaster Mix by Adrian Sherwood) – 7:00

== Personnel ==
- Jonathan More – drum machine, bass, percussion, keyboard, engineering, turntable, sampler
- Matt Black – synthesizer, drum machine, keyboard, engineering, turntable, sampler
- Tony Harris – engineering
- George Shilling – engineering
- Lisa Stansfield – vocals
- Barry Clempson – engineering
- Ian Devaney – piano, keyboard
- Merlin T. – engineering
- Dave Campbell – engineering
- John Jamieson – keyboard
- Junior Reid – vocals
- Snowboy – percussion
- Mark E. Smith – vocals
- Cleveland Watkiss – backing vocals
- Queen Latifah – vocals
- Yasmina Evans – vocals
