= Timber (Coldcut and Hexstatic song) =

Single by Coldcut and Hexstatic

from the album Let Us Play!
- Released: January 1998
- Genre: Electronic
- Length: 4:30
- Label: Ninja Tune
- Songwriter(s): Jonathan More, Matt Black, Stuart Warren-Hill
- Producer(s): Coldcut, Stuart Warren-Hill

"Timber" is a song by UK dance act Coldcut with Hexstatic.

"Timber" contains audio samples of logging activities from a Greenpeace film about rainforest destruction, as shown in the original video for the song, and was conceived by the band as a protest against the excesses of the logging industry.

The 2001 Guinness Book of Records listed the song under Most Music Videos For One Song, since there are five different videos for the song: the original mix, the EBN remix, the LPC remix, the Clifford Gilberto remix and the Gnomadic remix. The Timber EP contains 7 versions of the song.
