= Yugen Blakrok =

South African rapper

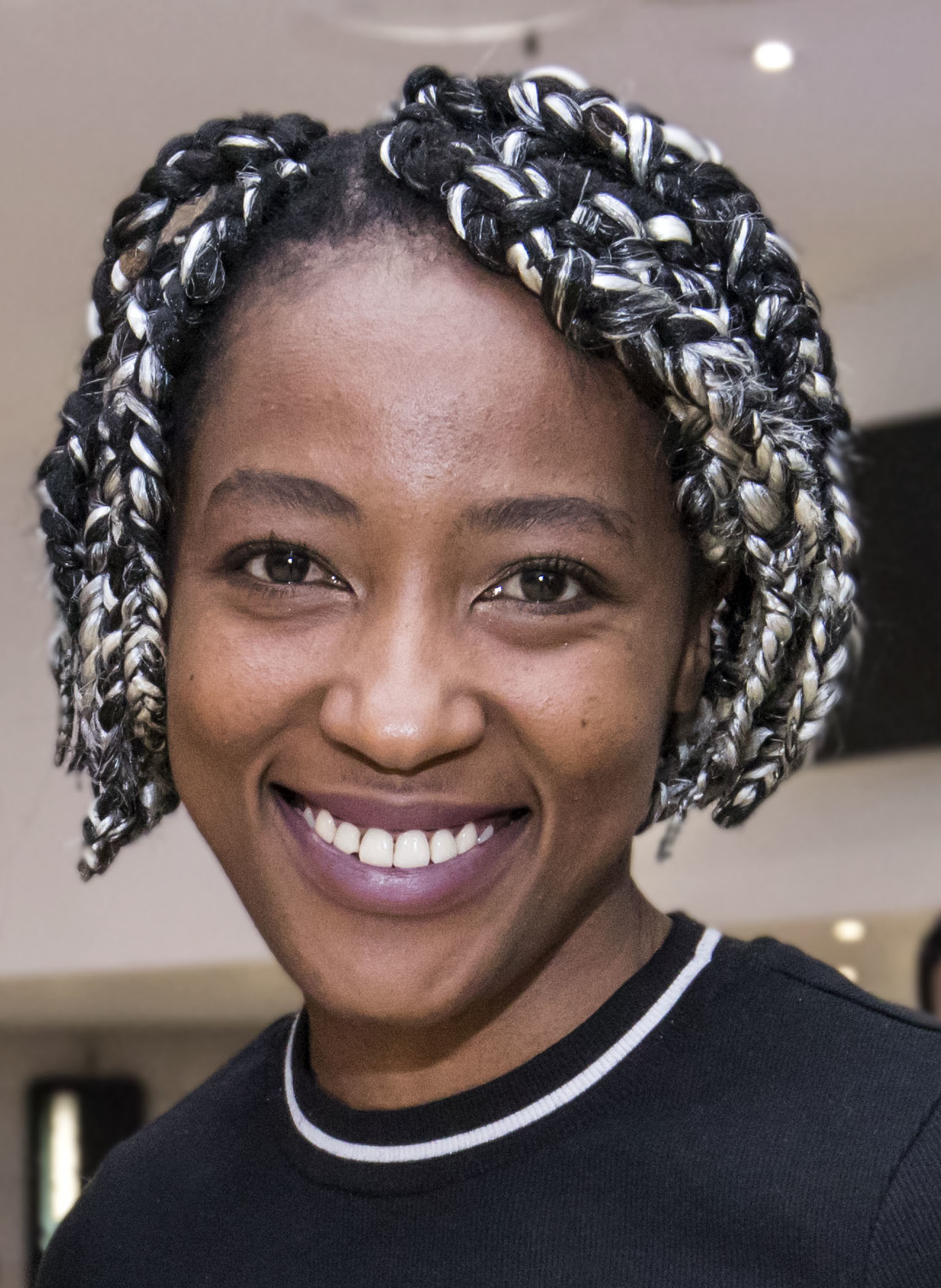
- Blakrok in 2018

Background information
- Born: Queenstown, South Africa
- Genres: South African hip hop; trip hop; experimental hip hop
- Occupations: Rapper; singer; songwriter
- Years active: 2008–present
- Labels: Iapetus Records; I.O.T. Records
- Website: https://yugenblakrok.bandcamp.com/

Yugen Blakrok is a South African rapper. She is best known for her performance on the track "Opps" with Vince Staples from the Kendrick Lamar-produced soundtrack to the movie Black Panther.

== Biography ==
Originally from Queenstown, Blakrok started emceeing in Yeoville, Johannesburg in 2007 with the Recess Poetry crew. In 2009 she joined producer Kanif the Jhatmaster's label Iapetus Records, and released her debut album Return of the Astro-Goth in 2013. The strength of her debut would earn her three nominations at the 2014 South African Hip Hop Awards and her first international tours. With newfound recognition she was invited to contribute to the Black Panther soundtrack and the soundtrack to the video game Cyberpunk 2077. Her second album, Anima Mysterium was released in 2019 and features collaborations with fellow South African musicians as well as Kool Keith; she performed the track "Morbid Abakus" from the album on COLORS. Her musical and cultural influences are eclectic, ranging from Wu-Tang Clan to Credo Mutwa to Carl Jung.

== Discography ==
=== Albums ===
- Return of the Astro-Goth (2013)
- Anima Mysterium (2019)
- The Illusion of Being (2025)

=== Singles ===
- "Carbon Form" (2018)
- "Picture Box" (2019)
- "Gorgon Madonna" (2019)
- "Pedestal" (2022)
- "Outnumbered" (2024)
- "Niacin" (2024)

=== Contributing artist ===
- Black Panther: The Album, Interscope (2018) - Track 5, "Opps" with Vince Staples and Kendrick Lamar
- Epic Beard Men This Was Supposed To Be Fun, (2019) - Track 12 "Foresight"
- Cyberpunk 2077: Radio, Vol. 1 (Original Soundtrack), Lakeshore Records (2020) - Track 4, "Metamorphosis"
- Keleketla! (2020) - Track 5, "Crystallise" with Tamar Osborn
- Wax Tailor The Shadows of Their Suns (2021) - Track 12, "Dusk To Dusk"
