= Let Us Play! =

Studio album by Coldcut
- Released: September 8, 1997
- Genres: Electronica, trip hop, hip-hop
- Label: Ninja Tune
- Producer: Coldcut

Coldcut chronology
Coldcut & DJ Food Fight (1997)	Let Us Play! (1997)	Let Us Replay! (1999)

Singles from Let Us Play!
- 1. "Timber" Released: January 1998

Professional ratings
Review scores
Source	Rating
AllMusic	3.5/5 stars
NME	5/10
Pitchfork	8.9/10
Uncut	4/5 stars

Let Us Play! is the fourth album by Coldcut, released in 1997. It was their first album to be released on their own label, Ninja Tune. It was featured in the video game LittleBigPlanet for the PlayStation Portable.

== Track listing ==
=== LP version ===
==== Side one ====
1. "Return to Margin"
2. "Atomic Moog 2000 (Post Nuclear Afterlife Lounge Mix)"
3. "Noah's Toilet"

==== Side two ====
1. "More Beats + Pieces (Daddy Rips It Up Mix)"
2. "Rubaiyat"
3. "Pan Opticon"

==== Side three ====
1. "Music 4 No Musicians"
2. "Space Journey"
3. "Timber"

==== Side four ====
1. "Every Home a Prison"
2. "Cloned Again"
3. "I'm Wild About That Thing (The Lost Sex Tapes: Position 1)"

=== CD version ===
==== Disc one ====
1. "Return to Margin"
2. "Atomic Moog 2000 (Post Nuclear Afterlife Lounge Mix)"
3. "More Beats + Pieces (Daddy Rips It Up Mix)"
4. "Rubaiyat"
5. "Pan Opticon"
6. "Music 4 No Musicians"
7. "Noah's Toilet"
8. "Space Journey"
9. "Timber"
10. "Every Home a Prison" [featuring Jello Biafra]
11. "Cloned Again"
12. "I'm Wild About That Thing (The Lost Sex Tapes: Position 1)"

==== Disc two ====
1. "Atomic Moog 2000 (Bullet Train)"

+"interactive toybox full of Coldcut games, toys & videos"

=== VHS version ===
1. "Return to Margin"
2. "Atomic Moog 2000 (Post Nuclear After Life Lounge)"
3. "Noah’s Toilet"
4. "More Beats and Pieces (Daddy Rips It Up Mix)"
5. "Rubaiyat"
6. "Pan Opticon"
7. "Music 4 No Musicians"
8. "Space Journey"
9. "Timber"
10. "Every Home a Prison"
11. "Cloned Again"
12. "I’m Wild About That Thing (The Lost Sex Tapes: Position 1)"
