= Rewind (Hexstatic album) =

Studio album by Hexstatic
- Released: 22 August 2000
- Genre: Electronic, acid jazz, trip hop
- Length: 41:56 NTONECD43
- Label: Ntone; NTONE43 (LP); NTONECD43 (CD)

Hexstatic chronology
Rewind (2000)	Listen & Learn (2003)

Professional ratings
Review scores
Source	Rating
AllMusic	link
Pitchfork Media	5.0/10 link

Rewind is the debut album by Hexstatic, released on Ntone (sister label to Ninja Tune) in March 2000. The album cover features a 1980 home computer, the Sinclair ZX80.

== Track listing ==
1. "Rewind Intro"
2. "Communication Break-Down"
3. "Deadly Media"
4. "Ninja Tune"
5. "Kids Can Dance"
6. "Robopop"
7. "Vector"
8. "The Horn"
9. "Auto"
10. "Machine Toy"
11. "Bass Invader"

The vinyl version of the album contains two additional tracks:

- "Timber" (Hardwood Mix)
- "Robopop" (Cyclon Attack Mix)
