= Hex (VJ group) =

Hex

Hex, or Hex Media, were a London-based multimedia group founded in the early 1990s by artist Robert Pepperell, coder Miles Visman and the DJ duo Coldcut. The group set out to exploit the creative potential of, what was then, the new media technologies of CD-ROM, multimedia, interactive computing, video sampling and portable video projection.

Working across a wide range of media - from computer games to art exhibitions - the group pioneered many new media hybrids, including live audiovisual jamming, computer-generated audio performances, and interactive collaborative instruments.

Their work was published on a series of interactive CD-ROMs, and exhibited widely - including at the JAM exhibition in London's Barbican Gallery in 1996 – and through the 'in-house' music label, Ninja Tune.

The group dispersed in the late 1990s, with later members Stuart Warren Hill and Robin Brunson going on to form the VJ outfit Hexstatic.

== Partial list of output ==
- Top Banana
- Total Chaos
