= Coldcut =

English electronic music duo

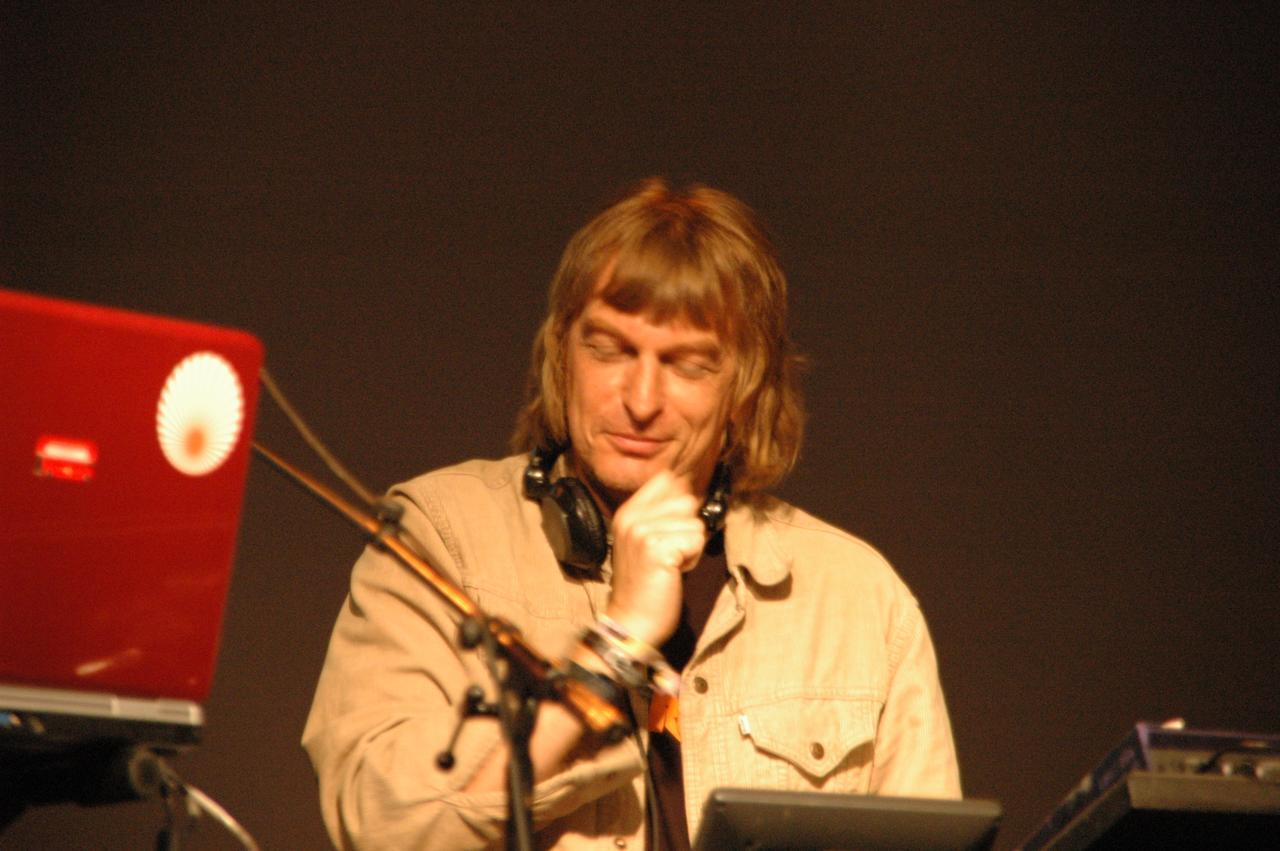
- Matt Black at a Coldcut performance, 2006

Background information
- Origin: London, England
- Genres: Electronic; house; hip-hop; trip hop; downtempo
- Years active: 1986–present
- Label: Ninja Tune (current) Tommy Boy/Reprise/Warner Bros. (former)
- Members: Matt Black; Jonathan More
- Website: Coldcut.net

Coldcut are an English electronic music duo composed of Matt Black and Jonathan More. Credited as pioneers for pop sampling in the 1980s, Coldcut are also considered the first stars of UK electronic dance music due to their innovative style, which featured cut-up samples of hip-hop, soul, funk, spoken word and various other types of music, as well as video and multimedia. According to Spin, "in '87 Coldcut pioneered the British fad for 'DJ records'".

Coldcut's records first introduced the public to pop artists Yazz and Lisa Stansfield, through which these artists achieved pop chart success. In addition, Coldcut has remixed and created productions on tracks by Eric B & Rakim, James Brown, Queen Latifah, Eurythmics, INXS, Steve Reich, Blondie, the Fall, Pierre Henry, Nina Simone, Fog, Red Snapper, and BBC Radiophonic Workshop.

Beyond their work as a production duo, Coldcut are the founders of Ninja Tune, an independent record label in London, England (with satellite offices in Los Angeles and Berlin) with an overall emphasis on encouraging interactive technology and finding innovative uses of software. The label's first releases (the first four volumes of DJ Food - Jazz Brakes) were produced by Coldcut in the early 1990s, and composed of instrumental hip-hop cuts that led the duo to help pioneer the trip hop genre, with artists such as Funki Porcini, the Herbaliser and DJ Vadim.

== Music career ==
=== 1980s ===
In 1986, computer programmer Matt Black and ex-art teacher Jonathan More were part-time DJs on the rare groove scene. More also DJed on pirate radio, hosting the Meltdown Show on Kiss FM and worked at the Reckless Records store on Berwick Street, London where Black visited as a customer. The first collaboration between the two artists was "Say Kids What Time Is It?" on a white label in January 1987, which mixed The Jungle Book's "King of the Swingers" with the break from James Brown's "Funky Drummer". The innovation of "Say Kids..." caused More and Black to be heralded by SPIN as "the first Brit artists to really get hip-hop's class-cutup aesthetic". It is regarded as the UK's first breaks record, the first UK record to be built entirely of samples and "the final link in the chain connecting European collage-experiment with the dance-remix-scratch edit". This was later sampled in "Pump Up the Volume" by MARRS, a single that reached number one in the UK in October 1987.

Though Black had joined Kiss FM with his own mix-based show, the pair eventually joined forces on its own show later in 1987 called Solid Steel. The eclectic show became a unifying force in underground experimental electronic music and is still running, celebrating 25 years in 2013.

The duo adopted the name "Coldcut" and set up a record label called Ahead of Our Time to release the single "Beats + Pieces" (one of the formats also included "That Greedy Beat") in 1987. All of these tracks were assembled using cassette pause button edits and later spliced tape edits that would sometimes run "all over the room". The duo used sampling from Led Zeppelin to James Brown. Electronic act the Chemical Brothers have described "Beats + Pieces" as the "first bigbeat record", a style which appeared in the mid-1990s.

Coldcut's first mainstream success came when Julian Palmer from Island Records asked them to remix Eric B. & Rakim's "Paid in Full". Released in October 1987, the landmark remix is said to have "laid the groundwork for hip hop's entry into the UK mainstream", becoming a breakthrough hit for Eric B & Rakim outside the U.S., reaching No. 15 in the UK, and the top 20 in a number of European countries. It featured a prominent Ofra Haza sample and many other vocal cut ups as well as a looped rhythm which later, when sped up, proved popular in the Breakbeat genre. Off the back of its success in clubs, the Coldcut "Seven Minutes of Madness" remix ended up being promoted as the single in the UK.

In 1988, More and Black formed Hex, a self-titled "multimedia pop group", with Mile Visman and Rob Pepperell. While working on videos for artists such as Kevin Saunderson, Queen Latifah and Spiritualized, Hex's collaborative work went on to incorporate 3D modelling, punk video art, and algorithmic visuals on desktop machines. The video for Coldcut's 'Christmas Break' in 1989 is arguably one of the first pop promos produced entirely on microcomputers.

In 1988, Coldcut released Out to Lunch With Ahead of Our Time, a double LP of Coldcut productions and re-cuts, and the various aliases under which the duo had recorded. This continued the duo's tradition of releasing limited available vinyl.

The next Coldcut single, released in February 1988, moved towards a more house-influenced style. "Doctorin' the House", which debuted singer Yazz, became a top ten hit, and peaked at No. 6. In the same year, under the guise Yazz and the Plastic Population, they produced "The Only Way Is Up", a cover of a Northern soul song. The record reached No. 1 in the UK in August, and remained there for five weeks, becoming 1988's second biggest selling single. Producer Youth of Killing Joke also helped Coldcut with this record. The duo had another top hit in September with "Stop This Crazy Thing", which featured reggae vocalist Junior Reid and reached number 21 in the UK.

The single "People Hold On" became another UK Top 20 hit. Released in March 1989, it helped launch the career of the then relatively unknown singer Lisa Stansfield. Coldcut and Mark Saunders produced her debut solo single "This Is the Right Time", which became another UK Top 20 hit in August as well as reaching No. 21 on the U.S. Billboard Hot 100 the following year.

As the duo started to enjoy critical and commercial success, their debut album What's That Noise? was released in April 1989 on Ahead of Our Time and distributed by Big Life Records. The album gave "breaks the full length treatment", and showcased "their heady blend of hip-hop production aesthetics and proto-acid house grooves". It also rounded up a heap of unconventional guest features, quoted by SPIN as having "somehow found room at the same table for Queen Latifah and Mark E. Smith". The album's track "I'm in Deep" (featuring Smith) prefigured the indie-dance guitar-breaks crossover of such bands as the Stone Roses and Happy Mondays, utilizing Smith's freestyle raucous vocals over an acid house backing, and also including psych guitar samples from British rock band Deep Purple. What's That Noise? reached the Top 20 in the UK and was certified Silver.

=== 1990s ===
Coldcut's second album, Some Like It Cold, released in 1990 on Ahead of Our Time, featured a collaboration with Queen Latifah on the single "Find a Way". Though "Find a Way" was a minor hit in the UK, no more singles were released from the album. The duo was given the BPI "Producer of the Year Award" in 1990. Hex - alongside some other London visual experimenters such as iE - produced a series of videos for a longform VHS version of the album. This continued Coldcut and Hex's pioneering of the use of microcomputers to synthesize electronic music visuals.

After their success with Lisa Stansfield, Coldcut signed with her label, Arista. Conflicts arose with the major label, as Coldcut's "vision extended beyond the formulae of house and techno" and mainstream pop culture (CITATION: The Virgin Encyclopedia Of Nineties Music, 2000). Eventually, the duo's album Philosophy emerged in 1993. Singles "Dreamer" and "Autumn Leaves" (1994) sung by vocalist Janis Alexander were both minor hits but the album did not chart.

"Autumn Leaves" had strings recorded at Abbey Road, with a 30-piece string section and an arrangement by film composer Ed Shearmur. The leader of the string section was Simon Jeffes of Penguin Cafe Orchestra. Coldcut's insistence on their friend Mixmaster Morris to remix "Autumn Leaves" led to one of Morris' most celebrated remixes, which became a minor legend in ambient music. It has appeared on numerous compilations.

In 1990, whilst on their first tour in Japan (which also featured Norman Cook, who later became Fatboy Slim), Matt and Jon formed their second record label, Ninja Tune, as a self-titled "technocoloured escape pod", and a way to escape the creative control of major labels. The label enabled them to release music under different aliases (e.g. Bogus Order, DJ Food), which also helped them to avoid pigeonholing as producers. Ninja Tune's first release was Bogus Order's "Zen Brakes". The name Coldcut stayed with Arista so there were no official Coldcut releases for the next three years.

During this time, Coldcut still produced for artists on their new label, releasing a flood of material under different names and continuing to work with young groups. They additionally kept on with Solid Steel on Kiss FM and running the night club Stealth (Club of the Year in the NME, The Face, and Mixmag in 1996).

In 1991, Hex released their first video game, Top Banana, which was included on a Hex release for the Commodore CDTV machine in 1992, arguably the first complete purpose-designed multimedia system. Top Banana was innovative in that it used sampled graphics, contained an ecological theme and a female lead character (dubbed "KT"), and its music changed through random processes. Coldcut and Hex presented this multimedia project as an example of the forthcoming convergence of pop music and computer-game characters.

In 1992, Hex's first single - "Global Chaos" / "Digital Love Opus 1" - combined rave visuals with techno and ambient interactive visuals. In November of that year, Hex released Global Chaos CDTV, which took advantage of the possibilities of the new CD-ROM medium. The Global Chaos CDTV disk (which contained the Top Banana game, interactive visuals and audio), was a forerunner of the "CD+" concept, uniting music, graphics, and video games into one. This multi-dimensional entertainment product received wide coverage in the national media, including features on Dance Energy, Kaleidoscope on BBC Radio 4, What's Up Doc? on ITV and Reportage on BBC Two. i-D Magazine was quoted as saying, "It's like your TV tripping".

Coldcut videos were made for most songs, often by Hexstatic, and used a lot of stock and sampled footage. Their "Timber" video, which created an AV collage piece using analogous techniques to audio sample collage, was put on heavy rotation on MTV. Stuart Warren Hill of Hexstatic referred to this technique as: "What you see is what you hear". "Timber" (which appears on both Let Us Play, Coldcut's fourth album, and Let Us Replay, their fifth) won awards for its innovative use of repetitive video clips synced to the music, including being shortlisted at the Edinburgh Television and Film Festival in their top five music videos of the year in 1998.

Coldcut began integrating video sampling into their live DJ gigs at the time, and incorporated multimedia content that caused press to credit the act as segueing "into the computer age". Throughout the 90s, Hex created visuals for Coldcut's live performances, and developed the CD-ROM portion of Coldcut's Let Us Play and Let Us Replay, in addition to software developed specifically for the album's world tour. Hex's inclusion of music videos and "playtools" (playful art/music software programs) on Coldcut's CD-ROM was completely ahead of the curve at that time, offering viewers/listeners a high level of interactivity. Playtools such as My Little Funkit and Playtime were the prototypes for Ninja Jamm, the app Coldcut designed and launched 16 years later. Playtime followed on from Coldcut and Hex's Synopticon installation, developing the auto-cutup algorhythm, and using other random processes to generate surprising combinations. Coldcut and Hex performed live using Playtime at the 1st Sonar Festival in 1994. Playtime was also used to generate the backing track for Coldcut's collaboration with Jello Biafra, "Every Home a Prison".

In 1994, Coldcut and Hex contributed an installation to the Glasgow Gallery of Modern Art. The piece, called Generator, was installed in the Fire Gallery. Generator was an interactive installation which allowed users to mix sound, video, text and graphics and make their own audio-visual mix, modelled on the techniques and technology used by Coldcut in clubs and live performance events. It consisted of two consoles: the left controlling how the sounds are played, the right controlling how the images are played.

As part of the JAM exhibition of "Style, Music and Media" at the Barbican Art Gallery in 1996, Coldcut and Hex were commissioned to produce an interactive audiovisual piece called Synopticon. Conceived and designed by Robert Pepperell and Matt Black, the digital culture synthesiser allows users to "remix" sounds, images, text and music in a partially random, partially controlled way.

The year 1996 also brought the Coldcut name back to More and Black, and the pair celebrated with 70 Minutes of Madness, a mix CD that became part of the Journeys by DJ series. The release was credited with "bringing to wider attention the sort of freestyle mixing the pair were always known for through their radio show on KISS FM, Solid Steel, and their steady club dates". It was voted "Best Compilation of All Time" by Jockey Slut in 1998.

In February 1997, they released a double pack single "Atomic Moog 2000" / "Boot the System", the first Coldcut release on Ninja Tune. This was not eligible for the UK chart because time and format restrictions prevented the inclusion of the "Natural Rhythm" video on the CD. In August 1997, a reworking of the early track "More Beats + Pieces" gave them their first UK Top 40 hit since 1989.

The album Let Us Play! followed in September and also made the Top 40. The fourth album by Coldcut, Let Us Play! paid homage to the greats that inspired them. Their first album to be released on Ninja Tune, it featured guest appearances by Grandmaster Flash, Steinski, Jello Biafra, Jimpster, The Herbaliser, Talvin Singh, Daniel Pemberton and Selena Saliva. Coldcut's cut 'n' paste method on the album was compared to that of Dadaism and William Burroughs. Hex collaborated with Coldcut to produce the multimedia CD-ROM for the album. Hex later evolved the software into the engine that was used on the Let Us Play! world tour.

In 1997, Matt Black - alongside Cambridge based developers Camart - created real-time video manipulation software VJAMM. It allowed users to be a "digital video jockey", remixing and collaging sound and images and trigger audio and visual samples simultaneously, subsequently bringing futuristic technology to the audio-visual field. VJAMM rivalled some of the features of high-end and high cost tech at the time. The VJAMM technology, praised as being proof of how far computers changed the face of live music, became seminal in both Coldcut's live sets (which were called a "revelaton" by Melody Maker and DJ sets. Their CCTV live show was featured at major festivals including Glastonbury, Roskilde, Sónar, the Montreux Jazz Festival, and John Peel's Meltdown. The "beautifully simple and devastatingly effective" software was deemed revolutionary, and became recognized as a major factor in the evolution of clubs. It eventually earned a place in the American Museum of the Moving Image's permanent collection. As quoted by The Independent, Coldcut's rallying cry was "Don't hate the media, be the media'". NME was quoted as saying: "Veteran duo Coldcut are so cool they invented the remix - now they are doing the same for television."

Also working with Camart, Black designed DJamm software in 1998, which Coldcut used on laptops for their live shows, providing the audio bed alongside VJAMM's audiovisual samples. Matt Black explained they designed DJamm so they "could perform electronic music in a different way – i.e., not just taking a session band out to reproduce what you put together in the studio using samples. It had a relationship to DJing, but was more interactive and more effective." Excitingly at that time, DJamm was pioneering in its ability to shuffle sliced loops into intricate sequences, enabling users to split loops into any number of parts.

In 1999, Let Us Replay! was released, a double-disc remix album where Coldcut's classic tunes were remixed by the likes of Cornelius (which was heralded as a highlight of the album, Irresistible Force, Shut Up And Dance, Carl Craig and J Swinscoe. Let Us Replay! pieces together "short sharp shocks that put the mental in 'experimental' and still bring the breaks till the breakadawn". It also includes a few live tracks from the duo's innovative world tour. The CD-ROM of the album, which also contained a free demo disc of the VJamm software, was one of the earliest audiovisual CD- ROMs on the market, and Muzik claimed deserved to "have them canonized...it's like buying an entire mini studio for under $15".

=== 2000s ===
In 2000, the Solid Steel show moved to BBC London.

Coldcut continued to forge interesting collaborations, including 2001's Re:volution as an EP in which Coldcut created their own political party (The Guilty Party). Featuring scratches and samples of Tony Blair and William Hague speeches, the 3-track EP included Nautilus' "Space Journey", which won an Intermusic contest in 2000. The video was widely played on MTV. With "Space Journey", Coldcut were arguably the first group to give fans access to the multitrack parts, or "stems" of their songs, building on the idea of interactivity and sharing from Let Us Play.

In 2001, Coldcut produced tracks for the Sega music video game Rez. Rez replaced typical video-game sound effects with electronic music; the player created sounds and melodies, intended to simulate a form of synesthesia. The soundtrack also featured Adam Freeland and Oval.

In 2002, while utilizing VJamm and Detraktor, Coldcut and Juxta remixed Herbie Hancock's classic "Rockit", creating both an audio and video remix.

Working with Marcus Clements in 2002, Coldcut released the sample manipulation algorthm from their DJamm software as a standalone VST plugin that could be used in other software, naming it the "Coldcutter".

Also in 2002, Coldcut with UK VJs Headspace (now mainly performing as the VJamm Allstars developed Gridio, an interactive, immersive audio-visual installation for the Pompidou Centre as part of the Sonic Process exhibition. The Sonic Process exhibition was launched at the MACBA in Barcelona in conjunction with Sónar, featuring Gridio as its centerpiece. In 2003, a commission for Graz led to a specially built version of Gridio, in a cave inside the castle mountain in Austria. Gridio was later commissioned by O2 for two simultaneous customised installations at the O2 Wireless Festivals in Leeds and London in 2007. That same year, Gridio was featured as part of Optronica at the opening week of the new BFI Southbank development in London.

In 2003, Black worked with Penny Rimbaud (ex-Crass) on Crass Agenda's Savage Utopia project. Black performed the piece with Rimbaud, Eve Libertine and other players at London's Vortex Jazz Club.

In 2004, Coldcut collaborated with American video mashup artist TV Sheriff to produce their cut-up entitled "Revolution USA". The tactical-media project (coordinated with Canadian art duo NomIg) followed on from the UK version and extended the premise "into an open access participatory project". Through the multimedia political art project, over 12 gigabytes of footage from the last 40 years of US politics were made accessible to download, allowing participants to create a cut-up over a Coldcut beat. Coldcut also collaborated with TV Sheriff and NomIg to produce two audiovisual pieces "World of Evil" (2004) and "Revolution '08" (2008), both composed of footage from the United States presidential elections of respective years. The music used was composed by Coldcut, with "Revolution '08" featuring a remix by the Qemists.

Later that year, a collaboration with the British Antarctic Survey (BAS) led to the psychedelic art documentary Wavejammer. Coldcut was given access to the BAS archive in order to create sounds and visuals for the short film.

Coldcut produced a radio play in 2004 in conjunction with Hari Kunzru for BBC Radio 3 (called Sound Mirrors).

Coldcut returned with the single "Everything Is Under Control" at the end of 2005, featuring Jon Spencer (of Jon Spencer Blues Explosion) and Mike Ladd. It was followed in 2006 by their fifth studio album Sound Mirrors, which was quoted as being "one of the most vital and imaginative records Jon Moore and Matt Black have ever made", and saw the duo "continue, impressively, to find new ways to present political statements through a gamut of pristine electronics and breakbeats" (CITATION: Future Music, 2007). The fascinating array of guest vocalists included Soweto Kinch, Annette Peacock, Ameri Baraka, and Saul Williams. The latter followed on from Coldcut's remix of Williams' "The Pledge" for a project with DJ Spooky.

A 100-date audiovisual world tour commenced for Sound Mirrors, which was considered "no small feat in terms of technology or human effort". Coldcut was accompanied by scratch DJ Raj Pannu and AV artist Juxta, in addition to guest vocalists from the album, including UK rapper Juice Aleem, Roots Manuva, Mpho Skeef, Jon Spencer and house legend Robert Owens.

Three further singles were released from the album including the Top 75 hit "True Skool" with Roots Manuva. The same track appeared on the soundtrack of the video game FIFA Street 2.

Sponsored by the British Council, in 2005 Coldcut introduced AV mixing to India with the Union project, alongside collaborators Howie B and Aki Nawaz of Fun-Da-Mental. Coldcut created an A/V remix of the Bollywood hit movie Kal Ho Naa Ho.

In 2006, Coldcut performed an A/V set based on "Music for 18 Musicians" as part of Steve Reich's 70th birthday gig at the Barbican Centre in London. This was originally written for the 1999 album Reich Remixed.

Coldcut remixed another classic song in 2007: Nina Simone's "Save Me". This was part of a remix album called Nina Simone: Remixed & Re-imagined, featuring remixes from Tony Humphries, Francois K and Chris Coco.

In February 2007, Coldcut and Mixmaster Morris created a psychedelic AV obituary/tribute Coldcut, Mixmaster Morris, Ken Campbell, Bill Drummond and Alan Moore (18 March 2007). Robert Anton Wilson tribute show. Queen Elizabeth Hall, London: Mixmaster Morris. (28 August 2009) to Robert Anton Wilson, the 60s author of Illuminatus! Trilogy. The tribute featured graphic novel writer Alan Moore and artist Bill Drummond and a performance by experimental theatre legend Ken Campbell. Coldcut and Morris' hour and a half performance resembled a documentary being remixed on the fly, cutting up nearly 15 hours' worth of Wilson's lectures.

In 2008, an international group of party organisers, activists and artists including Coldcut received a grant from the Intelligent Energy Department of the European Union, to create a project that promoted intelligent energy and environmental awareness to the youth of Europe. The result was Energy Union, a piece of VJ cinema, political campaign, music tour, party, art exhibition and social media hub. Energy Union toured 12 EU countries throughout 2009 and 2010, completing 24 events in total. Coldcut created the Energy Union show for the tour, a one-hour Audio/Visual montage on the theme of Intelligent Energy. In presenting new ideas for climate, environmental and energy communication strategies, the Energy Union tour was well received, and reached a widespread audience in cities across the UK, Germany, Belgium, The Netherlands, Croatia, Slovenia, Austria, Hungary, Bulgaria, Spain and the Czech Republic.

Also in 2008, Coldcut was asked to remix the theme song for British cult TV show Doctor Who for the program's 40th anniversary. In October 2008, Coldcut celebrated the legacy of the BBC Radiophonic Workshop (the place where the Doctor Who theme was created) with a live DJ mix at London's legendary Roundhouse. The live mix incorporated classic Radiophonic Workshop compositions with extended sampling of the original gear.

Additionally in 2008, Coldcut remixed "Ourselves", a Japanese No. 1 hit from the single "&" by Ayumi Hamasaki. This mix was included on the album Ayu-mi-x 6: Gold.

Starting in 2009, Matt Black, with musician/artist/coder Paul Miller (creator of the TX Modular Open Source synth), developed Granul8, a new type of visual fx/source Black termed a "granular video synthesiser". Granul8 allows the use of realtime VJ techniques including video feedback combined with VDMX VJ software.

From 2009 onwards, Black has been collaborating with coder and psychedelic mathematician William Rood to create a forthcoming project called Liveloom, a social media AV mixer.

=== Recent work ===
In 2010, Coldcut celebrated 20 years of releasing music with its label, Ninja Tune. A book entitled Ninja Tune: 20 Years of Beats and Pieces was released on 12 August 2010, and an exhibition was held at Black Dog Publishing's Black Dog Space in London, showcasing artwork, design and photography from the label's 20-year history. A compilation album was released on 20 September in two formats: a regular version consisting of two 2-disc volumes, and a limited edition which contained six CDs, six 7" vinyl singles, a hardback copy of the book, a poster and additional items. Ninja Tune also incorporated a series of international parties. This repositioned Ninja as a continually compelling and influential label, being one of the "longest-running (and successful) UK indie labels to come out of the late-1980s/early-90s explosion in dance music and hip-hop" (Pitchfork, 28 September 2010). Pitchfork claimed it had a "right to show off a little".

In July 2013, Coldcut produced a piece entitled "D'autre" based on the writings of French poet Arthur Rimbaud, for Forum Des Images in Paris. The following month, in August, Coldcut produced a new soundtrack for a section of André Sauvage's classic film Études sur Paris, which was shown as part of Noise of Art at the BFI in London, which celebrated 100 years of electronic music and silent cinema. Coldcut put new music to films from the Russolo era, incorporating original recordings of Russolo's proto-synths.

In 2014, Coldcut did three soundtracks as part of the project New City, a series of animated skylines of the near future developed by Tomorrow's Thought Today's Liam Young, with accompanying writing from sci-fi authors Jeff Noon, Pat Cadigan and Tim Maughan.

Most recently, Coldcut released Ninja Jamm, a music making app, for Android and iOS, in collaboration with London-based arts and technology firm Seeper. Geared toward both casual listeners and more experienced DJs and music producers, the freemium app allows users to download, remix and make music with samplepacks and tunepacks that feature pro quality sample libraries and also original tracks and mixes by Coldcut, as well as other Ninja artists, creating something new altogether. With the "intuitive yet deep" app, users can turn instruments on and off, swap between clips, add glitches and effects, trigger and pitch-bend stabs and one-off samples, and change the tempo of the track instantly. Users can additionally record as they mix and instantly upload to SoundCloud or save the mixes locally. Tunepack releases for Ninja Jamm are increasingly synchronised with Ninja Tune releases on conventional formats. To date, over 30 tunepacks have been released, including Amon Tobin, Bonobo, Coldcut, DJ Food, Martyn, Lapalux, Machinedrum, Raffertie, Irresistible Force, FaltyDL, Shuttle, Starkey. Ninja Jamm was featured by Apple in the New and Noteworthy section of the App Store in the week of release and it received over 100,000 downloads in the first week. Coldcut are developing Ninja Jamm further after the Android release garnered acclaim from the Guardian, Independent, Gizmodo and many more reviewers.

In 2017, Ahead of Our Time released the album Stories from Far Away on Piano by James Heather, and also released its follow up in 2022, the album Invisible Forces.

On 6 December 2017, BBC Radio 4 broadcast a play, Billie Homeless Dies at the End by Tom Kelly with electronic music by Coldcut.

In 2020, Coldcut appeared on the global music/afrobeat album Keleketla! (with artists such as Tenderlonious, Tamar Osborn, Sibusile Xaba, Thabang Tabane and Tony Allen), which was released on their Ahead of Our Time Records label.

On 19 November 2021, Ahead of Our Time released an ambient compilation curated out of old and new compositions and extra sequencing with the help of Mixmaster Morris. The compilation featured music by Ryuichi Sakamoto, Julianna Barwick, Daniel Pemberton, Kaitlyn Aurelia Smith, Sigur Rós, Laraaji and many more artists, purposefully ranging in prominence.

== Discography ==
=== Albums ===
List of albums, with selected chart positions
Title	Album details	Peak chart positions	
Title	Album details	UK	AUS
What's That Noise?	Released: 1989	20	103
Some Like It Cold	Released: 1990		153
Philosophy	Released: 1993		—
Let Us Play!	Released: 1997; Label: Ninja Tune	33	153
Sound Mirrors	Released: 2006	—	—

=== Singles ===
Year	Single	Peak positions										Album
Year	Single	UK	IRE	NED	BEL (FLA)	FRA	SWI	GER	AUS	NZ	US Dance	Album
1987	"Say Kids What Time Is It?"	—	—	—	—	—	—	—	—	—	—	Single only
1987	"Beats + Pieces" (featuring Floormaster Squeeze)	—	—	—	—	—	—	—	—	—	—	What's That Noise?
1988	"Doctorin' the House" (featuring Yazz & the Plastic Population)	6	16	20	40	—	4	11	45	33	3	What's That Noise?
1988	"Stop This Crazy Thing" (featuring Junior Reid & the Ahead of Our Time Orchestra)	21	—	22	24	—	19	28	83	—	32	What's That Noise?
1989	"People Hold On" (featuring Lisa Stansfield)	11	—	37	32	45	—	24	78	38	6	What's That Noise?
1989	"My Telephone" (featuring Lisa Stansfield)	52	—	—	—	—	—	62	—	—	—	What's That Noise?
1989	"Coldcut's Christmas Break"	67	—	—	—	—	—	—	—	—	—	Singles only
1990	"Coldcut' Megamix" (France only)	—	—	—	—	—	—	—	—	—	—	Singles only
1990	"Find a Way" (featuring Queen Latifah)	52	—	85	—	—	—	—	—	—	—	Some Like It Cold
1993	"Dreamer"	54	—	—	—	—	—	—	107	—	—	Philosophy
1993	"Autumn Leaves"	50	—	—	—	—	—	—	—	—	—	Philosophy
1997	"Atomic Moog 2000 / Boot the System"	—	—	—	—	—	—	—	—	—	—	Let Us Play!
1997	"More Beats + Pieces"	37	—	—	—	—	—	—	—	—	—	Let Us Play!
1998	"Timber" (with Hexstatic)	86	—	—	—	—	—	—	—	30	—	Let Us Play!
2001	"Re:volution" (as Coldcut & the Guilty Party)	67	—	—	—	—	—	—	—	—	—	Single only
2005	"Mr. Nichols" (featuring Saul Williams) (promo only)	—	—	—	—	—	—	—	—	—	—	Sound Mirrors
2005	"Everything Is Under Control" (featuring Jon Spencer and Mike Ladd)	93	—	—	—	—	—	—	—	—	—	Sound Mirrors
2006	"Man in a Garage" (featuring John Matthias)	95	—	—	—	—	—	—	—	—	—	Sound Mirrors
2006	"True Skool" (featuring Roots Manuva)	61	—	—	—	—	—	—	—	—	—	Sound Mirrors
2006	"Walk a Mile in My Shoes" (featuring Robert Owens)	103	—	—	—	—	—	—	—	—	—	Sound Mirrors
2016	"Everyday Another Sanction" (as Coldcut x On-U Sound featuring Chezidek)	—	—	—	—	—	—	—	—	—	—	Outside the Echo Chamber
"—" denotes releases that did not chart or were not released.

=== Compilations and mix albums ===
- ColdKrushCuts (mixed by Coldcut / DJ Food + DJ Krush) (1996)
- Journeys by DJ: 70 minutes of Madness (1995)
- Let Us Replay! (1999)
- Cold-Cut-Outs (2002)
- People Hold On — The Best of Coldcut (2004)
- Coldcut Selection Deal
- @0 (with Mixmaster Morris) (2021)

=== Other ===
- Zen Brakes [as Bogus Order] (1990)
- Only Heaven EP (2016)
- Outside the Echo Chamber [as Coldcut x On-U Sound] (2017)
