= Matt Black (DJ) =

British DJ and musician

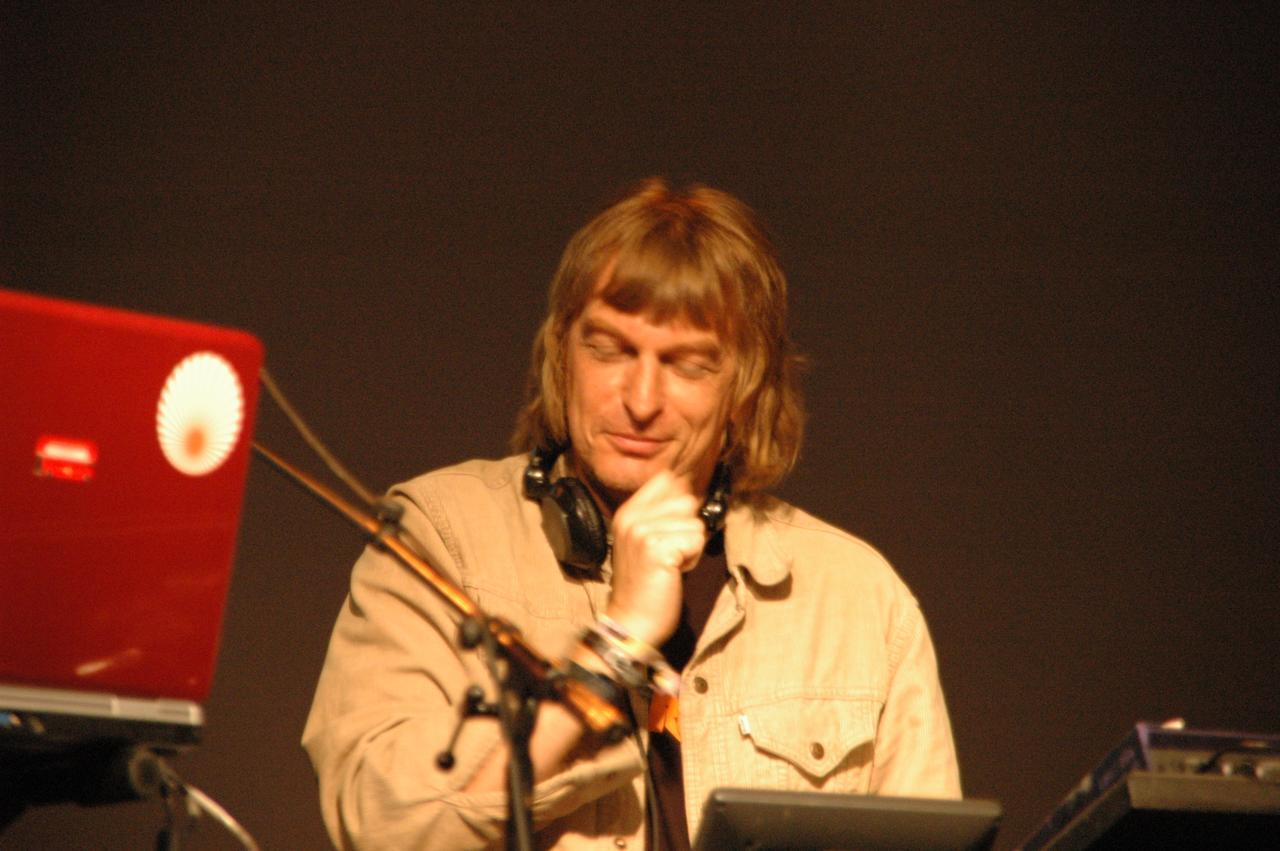
Matt Black during a Coldcut performance, 2006.

Matthew Cohn, known by the stage name Matt Black, is a British DJ and one half of music duo Coldcut (along with Jonathan More), who founded the Ninja Tune record label.

As a student at New College, Oxford, he was a member of a band called The Jazz Insects, whose first single was played by John Peel in his radio show.

Black is one of the inventors of the VJamm software used in the Coldcut live shows and also co-developed a "granular video synthesizer" titled Granul8. He is also a founding member of the (now defunct) VJ group Hex, and of the VJ group The VJamm Allstars with whom he continues to perform shows and has also worked alongside Crass Agenda as part of the Savage Utopia project.

Cohn is the grandson of the architect and designer Wells Coats.
