= List of Ninja Tune artists =

This is a complete full list artists who have recorded for Ninja Tune Records. Listed in parentheses are names of Ninja Tune affiliated labels, under which the artist recorded (Big Dada, Brainfeeder, Counter Audio, Girls Music, Motion Audio and Ntone).

- Last updated on 21 April 2012

== A ==
- Airborn Audio
- Agung Gede
- Ammoncontact
- Amon Tobin
- Andreya Triana
- Animals on Wheels
- Antibalas Afrobeat Orchestra
- Antipop Consortium (Big Dada)
- Apple

== B ==
- Bang On! (Big Dada)
- Ben Böhmer
- Blockhead
- Bogus Order
- Bonobo
- The Bug
- Busdriver (Big Dada)

== C ==
- Chris Bowden
- The Cinematic Orchestra
- Clifford Gilberto
- Clusterfunk
- Coldcut

== D ==
- Daedelus (Brainfeeder/Ninja Tune)
- The Death Set
- Deco Child
- DELS (Big Dada)
- Diplo (Big Dada)
- DJ Food
- DJ Kentaro
- DJ Seinfeld
- DJ Vadim
- DK
- Dorian Concept
- The Dragons
- Dwight Trible
- Dynamic Syncopation
  - DSP
- Dwight Trible

== E ==
- Emika
- Eskmo
- Euphoreal

== F ==
- FaltyDL
- Fink
- Flanger
- Floating Points
- Fog
- Funki Porcini

== G ==
- Gideon
- Ghislain Poirier
- Gorse panshawe (formerly Slugabed)
- Grasscut

== H ==
- The Heavy
- The Herbaliser
- Hex
- Hexstatic
- Hint
- Homelife
- Hot Sugar

== I ==
- Igor Boxx
- Illuminati of Hedfunk
- The Invisible
- The Irresistible Force

== J ==
- Jade
- Jaga Jazzist
- Jammer
- Juice Aleem

== K ==
- Kid Koala
- King Cannibal
- King Geedorah MF Doom (Big Dada)
- KT and Hex

== L ==
- Lapalux
- Letherette
- Loka
- London Funk Allstars
- The Long Lost
- Lorn (Brainfeeder/Ninja Tune)

== M ==
- Max & Harvey
- Mr. Scruff (Ninja Tuna)

== N ==
- Neotropic
- Nonplace Urban Field
- NW1 & Born 2 B

== O ==
- One Self

== P ==
- Plug
- Poirier
- Pest
- Please
- Producers for Bob

== Q ==
- The Qemists

== R ==
- Raffertie
- Rainstick Orchestra
- Roots Manuva (Big Dada)

== S ==
- Shuttle
- Sim Fane
- Sixtoo
- Skalpel
- Spank Rock (Big Dada)
- Speech Debelle (Big Dada)
- Starkey
- Stateless
- Steinski and Mass Media
- Sticky (Big Dada)
- Super Numeri

== T ==
- T Love
- Toddla T
- Treva Whateva
- Ty (Big Dada)

== U ==
- Ulanbator
- Up, Bustle and Out

== W ==
- Wagon Christ
- Wiley (Big Dada)

== Y ==
- Yeule
- Yppah

== Z ==
- Zero dB

== 0-9 ==
- 9 Lazy 9

== See also ==
- List of record labels
- List of independent UK record labels
