= Xen Cuts =

Compilation album by Various artists
- Released: 19 September 2000
- Length: 3:53:10
- Label: Ninja Tune; ZENCD049; ZENCD049X

Various artists chronology
Zentonedada (1999)	Xen Cuts (2000)	Solesides Greatest Bumps (2000)

Xen Cuts is a compilation album released by Ninja Tune independent record label on their tenth anniversary. The album was released in a four-piece vinyl recording (ZEN49), as two-disc CD (ZENCD049) and as a three-disc CD (ZENCD049X) versions, with the third disc "Xen Cuts Missed Flipped and Skipped" also released separately (ZENCD49C). The compilation consists mainly of B-sides and other tracks previously unreleased on CD.

== Track listing ==
=== Disc one ===
1. "The Xen To One Ratio" - Steinski – 1:03
2. "Showtime" - Big Dada Sound – 4:45
3. "2 Tha Left" (featuring Mass Influence) - Dynamic Syncopation – 3:21
4. "QMS" - T-Love – 5:00
5. "8pt Agenda" (featuring Latyrx) - The Herbaliser – 5:00
6. "Ug" - Mr. Scruff – 4:33
7. "Memories" (featuring Shorti) - Neotropic – 3:12
8. "Rhythm & Blues Angus Steakhouse" - Cabbageboy – 4:25
9. "Saboteur" (Roots Manuva version) - Amon Tobin – 4:22
10. "Your Revolution (version)" (featuring Sarah Jones) - DJ Vadim – 4:53
11. "Nepalese Bliss" (Jimpster mix) - The Irresistible Force – 5:17
12. "Emperor's Main Course" - Kid Koala – 4:04
13. "Give It Up" - Coldcut – 5:08
14. "Hip Hop Barrio" - Up, Bustle and Out – 4:35
15. "Blue Flames" - Quannum MC's – 5:05
16. "Night Night Theme" - The Infesticons – 4:06
17. "I Hear The Drummer" - Luke Vibert – 4:07
18. "Ninjah (We Are Ninja)" (featuring Frank Chickens) - Fink – 5:15

=== Disc two ===
1. "The Joy Of X (Spotters Delight)" - Flexus Intro (Strictly Kev of DJ Food) – 1:44
2. "The 10th Victim" - The Clifford Gilberto Rhythm Combination – 4:18
3. "Soul Pride" - Neptune (PC and Jason Swinscoe of The Cinematic Orchestra) – 6:36
4. "Los Locos Cubanos (Snowboy's Batarumbaconga mix)" - Up, Bustle and Out – 4:23
5. "Down & To The Left" - Amon Tobin – 5:21
6. "My Life's In These Bottles" - Loka – 5:28
7. "Original Sins" - Chris Bowden – 7:36
8. "Restless" - The Clifford Gilberto Rhythm Combination – 5:32
9. "Build A Church With Your Fear" - Animals on Wheels – 6:39
10. "The Ageing Young Rebel (Gentle Cruelty)" (featuring Ken Nordine) - DJ Food – 8:28
11. "Quicksilver Loom" - Flanger – 8:20
12. "Big Sea (edit)" - Funki Porcini – 4:34
13. "Arcane" - Arc – 4:21
14. "Big Amoeba Sound" - Max & Harvey – 4:00

=== Disc Three (Xen Cuts Missed Flipped and Skipped) ===
1. "Twice The First Time" - Saul Williams – 4:32
2. "More Beats & Pieces" (John McEntire Tortoise mix) - Coldcut – 6:03
3. "Dubble (Organ Swell)" - Funki Porcini – 6:55
4. "No Mind" - Happy Campers – 5:02
5. "Peace Pt. 1" - DJ Food – 4:52
6. "Happy Band" - Mr. Scruff – 5:06
7. "Drunk Trumpet" (Live At The Metro, Chicago) - Kid Koala – 3:55
8. "Non Lateral Hypothesis" - DJ Vadim – 5:26
9. "Ninja Tune (Enter The Augmenter)" (The Process mix) - Hexstatic – 4:08
10. "Movements" (Live At Inside Tracks) - Roots Manuva – 4:25
11. "Tried By 12" (Squarepusher remix) - East Flatbush Project – 2:56
12. "Feel'n You & Me" - Sukia vs. DJ Food – 6:20
13. "Channel 1 Suite" (Four Tet remix) - The Cinematic Orchestra – 7:36
14. "Bad Sex" (featuring Chris Morris) - Amon Tobin – 5:45
15. "Bruce Lee MC (edit)" - Quincy – 4:38

== Reception ==
Professional ratings
Review scores
Source	Rating
AllMusic	3/5 stars
Pitchfork Media	(9.1/10)
Select	4/5 medals

Select gave the album a four out of five rating, stating that "Though so big it occasionally get airless, if you persevere it soon becomes clear how this is one of the highest quality labels in the land."
