= Good Heavens (band) =

Australian musical group

- Origin: Sydney, New South Wales, Australia
- Genre: Indie rock
- Years active: 2011–2013
- Label: Rice Is Nice/Inertia
- Past members: Sarah Kelly; Myles Heskett; Chris Ross

Good Heavens were an Australian indie rock band. Formed in 2011 by Sarah Kelly (ex-the Red Sun Band) on lead vocals, with ex-Wolfmother (2004–08) musicians Chris Ross (on bass and keyboard) and Myles Heskett (on drums), both were also in the Slew (2009–10). The trio's first album, Strange Dreams, was released via Rice Is Nice in August 2012.

== History ==
Good Heavens were formed two years after the break up of Sarah Kelly's previous band, the Red Sun Band, in 2009. Kelly continued to write music, and approached Julia Wilson of Sydney indie label, Rice is Nice, about recording and releasing a new album. Wilson recommended working with Myles Heskett, who in turn suggested Chris Ross. Since departing Wolfmother in 2008, Heskett and Ross had recorded as members of North American electronic artists, the Slew, with Kid Koala, but they were between projects by late 2010. Kelly described the group's influences, "for Chris and Myles it would be Pink Floyd and Black Sabbath, whereas I’d be more The Beatles."

Good Heavens' first single, "It's not Easy Being Mean", was released in July 2012, a year after they formed. It was followed by their first album, Strange Dreams, in August. The Sydney Morning Herald's Douglas Fry determined, "[they] craft what could have been a contrived – but is actually a compelling – debut album... [it features] time travel through '70s Aussie pub rock into Owlsley's California. Psychedelic wandering and balls-out power riffs bound by pop sensibility. Pinches of Moog for some willowy MSG... Vocals like make-up sex; bitter and sad and soothing and hot." They issued a music video for the title track, which was directed by Adam Harding.

Good Heavens performed at the Boogie 7 festival in Tallarook in late March 2013. In May of that year Heskett and Ross provided a song writing workshop, including "[their] collaboration with award winning songwriter Sarah Kelly." Gillian Harrison of Happy Mag described the group, "one of the many Australian psychedelic, 70's inspired, indie rock bands swanning their goods and passion for the era... [which] successfully find a fusion between the female high range vocals and the solid thumping guitar slamming and measured percussion."

== Discography ==
=== Albums ===
- Strange Dreams (August 2012) – Rice Is Nice/Inertia Records (RIN017)

=== Singles ===
- "It's Not Easy Being Mean" (July 2012) – Rice Is Nice
