= Space cadet =

Space Cadet is a 1948 science-fiction novel for young adults by Robert A. Heinlein.

Space cadet may also refer to:

== Arts and entertainment ==
=== Comics ===
- Space Cadet (comic), a 1965 feature in the British Ranger magazine
- Space Cadet (graphic novel), 2011, by Kid Koala—with an accompanying music CD

=== Film ===
- Space Cadet (2024 film), a film starring its executive producer Emma Roberts
- Space Cadet (2025 film), a Canadian animated film by Kid Koala

=== Music ===
- "Space Cadet" (song), 2019, by Metro Boomin
- Space Cadet (EP), 2019, by Beabadoobee
- Space Cadet Solo Flight, a 1981 album by KC and the Sunshine Band
- "Space Cadet", a song by Kyuss from Welcome to Sky Valley
- "Space Cadet", a song by hip-hop artist Kollision from album Control The Streets Vol. 1
- Space Cadets, a band with Jim Capaldi on drums

=== Television ===
- Space Cadets (game show), a 1997 British television comedy panel show
- Space Cadets (TV series), a 2005 hoax event and reality show on British television
- "Space Cadet" (Recess episode)
- "Space Cadet" (Family Guy), an episode of Family Guy

=== Video games ===
- Space Cadet, a table in the Full Tilt! Pinball computer pinball simulation game
- Space Cadet, the lowest rank for a player in the arcade video game Gorf, the rank at which players start the game

== Other uses ==
- Space-cadet keyboard, a 1978 computer keyboard layout with seven modifier keys
- Various slang uses of space cadet derived from the novel and its spin-offs

== See also ==
- Tom Corbett, Space Cadet, 1950s literary and audiovisual spin-offs of Heinlein's novel created by Joseph Greene
- Stace Cadet, an Australian electronic music producer and DJ
