= Shadow Records =

- Parent company: Knitting Factory Records
- Founded: 1995
- Distributor(s): Instinct Records
- Genre: Electronic, abstract hip hop, nu jazz, drum and bass, instrumental hip hop, chillout
- Country of origin: US
- Location: New York
- Official website: http://www.shadowrecords.com/

Shadow Records was launched in 1995 as a sub-label of Instinct Records, with a focus on the more organic side of the underground electronic music scene. The label's first release in 1995, Abstrackt Workshop, featured performances by DJ Krush, Funki Porcini, and Marden Hill in addition to songs from labels like Pussyfoot and Yellow Productions.

The next step included a 2-year involvement with the UK beat label Ninja Tune. This partnership introduced the likes of Funki Porcini, DJ Food, 9 Lazy 9, Up, Bustle and Out, Hedfunk, and London Funk Allstars to US audiences.

Shadow went on to release US debut CDs from DJ Krush, DJ Cam, Cujo, Shantel, James Hardway and Ollano. Shadow Records has also brought an array of artists to the US, having worked with such European underground labels as Stereo Deluxe, Freerange, Cup Of Tea, Five Star Recordings, Recordings Of Substance, Hospital, nineBAR, Infracom, and DiY.

Shadow continues with exploration into the experimental side of electronic music, with a series of mix CDs from the likes of DJ Cam, Kruder & Dorfmeister and Jimpster. Future mix CDs include Jack Dangers (Meat Beat Manifesto, Tino Corp.), and Carl Craig.

== Adventures in Foam controversy ==
Following Amon Tobin's (formerly Cujo) success with Bricolage under Ninja Tune, Shadow Records re-released Adventures in Foam, an early album of the artist's, with unapproved artwork and mistitled tracks. Such was the discrepancy that Ninja Tune saw fit to produce its own re-release in 2002, stating its position on Shadow Records' conduct rather harshly in the process.

== Artists ==
- The 13th Sign
- 808 State
- 9 Lazy 9
- Alphazone (US)
- Anthea
- Blend
- Bluescreen
- Carl Craig
- Count Basic
- Cujo
- Da Germ
- Deadly Avenger
- Differenz
- Digital Alkemist
- disJam
- DJ Cam
- DJ Food
- DJ Krush
- DJ Spooky That Subliminal Kid
- Droid
- Echostar
- Funki Porcini
- Frost
- Fugitive Elf
- Futique
- Goo
- Greg Long
- Hedfunk
- Hybrid Device
- Illform / Quentin's Ladder
- Jimpster
- Justice
- Le Gooster
- London Funk Allstars
- Magnetic
- Marschmellows
- Mujaji
- Nostramus
- Obo
- The Odd Toot
- Ollano
- The Poets Of Rhythm
- Raucous a/k/a Sabotage
- Saru
- Sector
- Shantel
- Sharpshooters
- Shawn Francis
- Spaceways
- Trigga Rick
- Ultralights
- Up, Bustle & Out

== Compilations ==
- Abstract Workshop - A Collection Of Trip Hop And Jazz (1995, SDW-12002-1/SDW001-2, 2xLP/CD)
- Five Star Galaxy Part One (1995, SDW020-2, CD)
- Ninja Tune USA - If Ya Can't Stand Da Beatz, Git Outta Da Kitchen (1996, SDW008-2, 2xCD)
- Abstrakt Workshop 2 (1996, SDW009-2, CD)
- Earthrise.Ninja.2 (1996, SDW-12010-1/SDW013-2, 12"/2xCD)
- Blunted: The Edinburgh Project (1996, SDW016-2, CD)
- Pure Abstrakt (1996, SDW019-2, CD)
- Five Star Galaxy Part 1 (1996, UR 21CD, CD)
- Five Star Galaxy Part Two: The Galaxy Strikes Back (1997, SDW023-2, CD)
- Blunted 2 (1997, SDW024-2, CD)
- Earthrise.Shadow.3 (1997, SDW026-2, CD)
- Joint Ventures (1997, SDW032-2, CD)
- State Of The Nu-Art (1997, SDW033-2, CD)
- Rewired Rhythms (1998, SDW034-2, CD)
- Songs Of The Siren (1998, SDW036-2, CD)
- State Of The Nu-Art Volume 2 (1998, SDW041-2, CD)
- Pure Abstrakt - Adventures In Dub (1998, SDW042-2, CD)
- Next Step Drum-n-Bass (1998, SDW043-2, CD)
- Cinematique, Scenes From a Movie (1998, SDW045-2, CD)
- Theatre Of Sound (1998, SDW047-2, CD)
- Conversions - A K&D Selection (1999, SDW051-2, CD)
- Drum 'N' Bass Conspiracy (1999, SDW053-2, CD)
- DiY Served Chilled (1999, SDW054-2, CD)
- Still Searchin (1999, SDW055-2, CD)
- Songs Of The Siren 2 (1999, SDW056-2, CD)
- Earthrise.Back.2.The.Beat (1999, SDW058-2, CD)
- Freebass Breakz And Sub Phunk Beats (1999, SDW060-2, CD)
- Rewired Rhythms 2 (1999, SDW062-2, CD)
- Beatz By Design (1999, SDW066-2, CD)
- Scrambled (2000, SDW080-2, CD)
- Blunted (2000, SDW093-2, CD)
- Ninja Tune: The Shadow Years (2001, SDW094-2, 2xCD)
- Shadow: Hard Sessions (2001, SDW095-2, CD)
- ¡Hello Friends! (2001, SDW097-2, CD)
- Shadow: Hed Sessions (2001, SDW099-2, CD)
- Si-Con (2001, SDW100-2, CD)
- Mainhatten Sound (2001, SDW108-2, CD)
- Through Rose Tinted Glasses (2001, SDW109-2, CD)
- Mush Filmstrip (Frame 1) (2001, SDW111-2, CD)
- Gomma Audio No. 1 (2001, SDW114-2, CD)
- Munich Manhattan (2001, SDW119-2, CD)
- Blunted 3 (2001, SDW120-2, CD)
- Elf Soulbound (2001, SDW121-2, CD)
- Undercurrents (2001, SDW122-2, CD)
- What Goes 'Round(2002, SDW12021, CD)
- The Yellow Room(2002, SDW126-2, CD)
- Shadow: Trance Sessions(2002, SDW127-2, CD)
- Modern Mantra Unmixed Vinyl Version (2002, SDW12021, 12")
- Audio.nl (2002, SDW131-2, CD)
- Shadow Masters New, Used, & Absurd (2002, SDW134-2, 2xCD)
- Hard Sessions 2 (2002, SDW136-2, CD)
- Hed Sessions 2 (2002, SDW153-2, CD)
- Dubtribe Sound System Vs. Chillifunk Recordings: Heavyweight Soundclash (2002, SDW154-2, CD)

== See also ==
- List of record labels
