= Scratchappyland =

EP by Kid Koala
- Released: 1997
- Genres: Turntable; hip-hop
- Length: 14:56
- Label: Ninja Tune
- Producer: Kid Koala

Professional ratings
Review scores
| Source | Rating |
|---|---|
| AllMusic | 4/5 stars |

Scratchappyland is an EP by Kid Koala, containing selections from the Scratchcratchratchatch mixtape. It was released in 10" format by Ninja Tune (ZEN10KK). Due to heavy use of unlicensed samples, the 10" has a label with 'for promotional use only - not for resale' printed on it.

== Track listing ==
Side A

1. "Start Hear"
2. "Dinner With Yoda"
3. "Statics Waltz (Lo-Fi Version)"
4. "Tricks N' Treats"

Side B

1. "Made From Scratch"
2. "Jhaptal"
3. "Taboo Soda"
4. "Almost Easy Listening"
5. "The Mushroom Factory"
6. "Thank You, Good Night, Drive Safely"
