= Live from the Short Attention Span Audio Theater Tour!! =

Live From the Short Attention Span Audio Theater Tour!!

Live album by Kid Koala
- Released: 8 March 2005
- Recorded: November 2003
- Genre: Turntable, Hip hop
- Label: Ninja Tune; ZENCD101

Kid Koala chronology
Some of My Best Friends Are DJs (2003)	Live From the Short Attention Span Audio Theater Tour!! (2005)	Your Mom's Favorite DJ (2006)

Professional ratings
Review scores
Source	Rating
Allmusic	2.5/5 stars

Live From the Short Attention Span Audio Theater Tour!! is a live album by Kid Koala. It was recorded at Lock 17 in London in November 2003.

The album contains two discs - a CD and a DVD - and includes a bingo card. It was recorded live on a tour of his previous album, Some of My Best Friends Are DJs and his graphic novel, Nufonia Must Fall.

San was backed up by P-Love and DJ Jester The Filipino Fist on the tour and live gigs featured turntablism, comedy, animations and bingo.:

== Track listing ==
1. "Stompin At Le Savoi"
2. "Page 275"
3. "Drunk Trumpet"
4. "Skanky Panky"
5. "Page 298"

The DVD contains the DJs performing the five tracks from the audio CD plus extras including a "random bingo image generator" and music videos featuring animations by Monkmus:

- "Tremors"
- "Knife In Back"
- "Birdhead"
- "Basin Street Blues"
