= 12 Bit Blues =

Studio album by Kid Koala
- Released: September 17, 2012
- Length: 41:15
- Label: Ninja Tune

Kid Koala chronology
Your Mom's Favorite DJ (2006)	12 Bit Blues (2012)	Music to Draw To: Satellite (2017)

12 Bit Blues is a studio album by Canadian DJ Kid Koala. It was released on the Ninja Tune label on September 17, 2012. It peaked at number 21 on Billboard's Top Dance/Electronic Albums chart, as well as number 6 on the Blues Albums chart.

== Recording ==
The album was recorded on an E-mu SP-1200, a 1987 drum machine and sampler known for its use in early hip hop. On the album, Kid Koala used it to manipulate old blues recordings. In making the album, Kid Koala did not use sequencing software, choosing instead to layer tracks of scratching and cutting on top of the manipulated blues samples.

== Critical reception ==
Professional ratings
Aggregate scores
Source	Rating
Metacritic	80/100
Review scores
Source	Rating
ABC News	favorable
AllMusic	4/5 stars
BBC	favorable
MSN Music (Expert Witness)	A−
Now	favorable

At Metacritic, which assigns a weighted average score out of 100 to reviews from mainstream critics, 12 Bit Blues received an average score of 80% based on 9 reviews, indicating "generally favorable reviews".

PopMatters named it the 6th best Canadian album of 2012.

== Track listing ==
No.	Title	Length
1.	"1 Bit Blues (10,000 Miles)"	4:01
2.	"2 Bit Blues"	3:28
3.	"3 Bit Blues"	2:56
4.	"4 Bit Blues"	3:54
5.	"5 Bit Blues"	4:37
6.	"6 Bit Blues"	4:27
7.	"7 Bit Blues"	4:32
8.	"8 Bit Blues (Chicago to NY to LA)"	4:10
9.	"9 Bit Blues"	2:16
10.	"10 Bit Blues"	2:08
11.	"11 Bit Blues"	3:14
12.	"Denouement"	1:37

== Charts ==
Chart	Peak position
US Top Dance/Electronic Albums (Billboard)	21
US Blues Albums (Billboard)	6
