= Mr Brubakers Strawberry Alarm Clock =

Studio album by Neotropic
- Released: 19 October 1998
- Recorded: 1997–1998
- Studios: Neotropic Media Centre, Shoreditch; Ninebar Studios; Justice League Studios, San Francisco
- Genres: Breakbeat techno; trip hop; IDM; sampledelia; experimental
- Length: 74:55
- Label: Ntone
- Producer: Neotropic

Neotropic chronology
15 Levels of Magnification (1996)	Mr Brubakers Strawberry Alarm Clock (1998)	La Prochaine Fois (2001)

Mr Brubakers Strawberry Alarm Clock is the second studio album by British electronic artist Riz Maslen under her pseudonym Neotropic, released in 1998 on Ntone. Maslen produced the album herself, and conceived it in part to musically vent some of her emotions and frustrations after several personal issues in her life. While the album has some similarities with her debut album, 15 Levels of Magnificence (1996), Mr Brubakers is more abstract, textured and eclectic, featuring specific elements from IDM and trip hop among other genres to create a unique sound. Several guest performers also appear on the record, including vocalists Paul Jason Fredericks and Nina Barry and guitarist Gary Lucas.

The album was critically acclaimed upon its release, with journalists praising its unusual, unique sound. In 2015, Fact Magazine featured the album in their list of the greatest trip hop albums. The album also received some radio success, and charted on several airplay charts. Maslen promoted the album with a tour in the United Kingdom and Europe and several shows in Australia.

== Background and recording ==
Riz Maslen began making electronic music in the early 1990s after teaching herself how to utilise a local recording studio. She released her first recording, "Bubble Dub", on the various artists compilation Bastard Tracks under the Neotropic pseudonym in 1994, and followed this with a string of singles and remixes before releasing her critically acclaimed debut album 15 Levels of Magnification (1996), which was noted for melding a number of electronic styles. After suffering several personal issues in her life, Maslen conceived her second album under the moniker, Mr Brubakers Strawberry Alarm Clock, as a means to vent her frustrations musically.

The majority of the album was recorded at Neotropic Media Centre, Shoreditch, with the exceptions being "Insane Moon", which was recorded at Ninebar Studios, and "Vent", which was recorded live on 4 April 1998 at Justice League Studios, San Francisco. Jamie Finch engineered the sessions, while Sean Magee edited the resulting material. Guests on the album include Paul Jason Fredericks, who provided vocals for "Insane Moon", Nina Barry, who provided vocals for "Gutted", and guitarist Gary Lucas who appears on "Vent". The majority of the compositions on the album were published by Big Orange Cat Music.

== Composition ==
Although Mr Brubakers Strawberry Alarm Clock bears some similarity to 15 Levels of Magnification in that both albums consist of "sampledelic, slightly atmospheric, breakbeat techno" with dusty breakbeats, Mr Brubakers is more abstract and adventurous than its predecessor, and introduces several elements from IDM while simultaneously avoiding that genre's "random, artificial bent." The album is noted for being very textured, containing unique beats and "a thick pulse," and although the record is beat-based and incorporates many samples, it also exhibits what Randall Roberts of CMJ New Music Monthly describes as "an obvious attention to the miniature, the patience to examine them, and the desire to communicate the unspeakable with pinpoint accuracy." The music also incorporates several psychedelic and garage flourishes which are said to be "more reminiscent of the 1960s" than 1998. Louise Grey of The Independent, meanwhile, called the album "a deft work, combining a real feeling for sonic depth and texture with compositional nous."

"The cover and title of the Strawberry Alarm Clock album are appropriate: Riz Maslen’s electronic music sounds distinctly clockwork-mechanical but also has a pleasure-centred succulence."

— Fact Magazine

Although most of the album is instrumental, it is Neotropic's first album features human voices, while still avoiding the creation of songs in a conventional sense. It has described as a dark album with light moments; in the words of Tomas Palermo, "the dark elements of Mr. Brubakers alternate with ripples of sweetness. But light is scarce throughout many of the album's heavier tracks." Maslen said the album's darkness was a therapy to help her cope with personal issues she was having at the time: "I guess dark is a good description. There is a little light heartedness thrown in for good measure, but at the time of writing the album I had a lot of personal shit going down in my life and this was, I guess, a form of therapy for me, vent all of my frustrations and emotions through the music, and also a good way of exorcising all those demons."

"Ultra Freaky Orange" features "data manipulation" by Bin Dogs, whilst the tense "Underviolent Objects" features a "wheezing" electro pulse which underlines a 'paranoid' string accompaniment and car alarm sound effects. The beats on the track are inspired by Brooklyn hip hop, with drum effects reminiscent of M.O.P. and Boot Camp Clik. Maslen's approach to beats and effects have been highlighted on the tracks "Vacetious Blooms" and "Improved Industrial Dwellings". "Gutted" features guest vocalist Nina Berry and lovesick lyrics that have been compared to PJ Harvey. "Vent", which features guitar from Gary Lucas, begins with a sample of a young girl singing "Lizzie Borden took an axe, gave her husband 40 whacks," and is said to be one of several Neotropic compositions which flash a "cannily female sensibility". Will Hermes of Spin felt that the tracks's "Glock-cocking percussion" evokes "Robert de Niro's battle-dressing scene from Taxi Driver as reimagined by Lara Croft."

== Album title and artwork ==
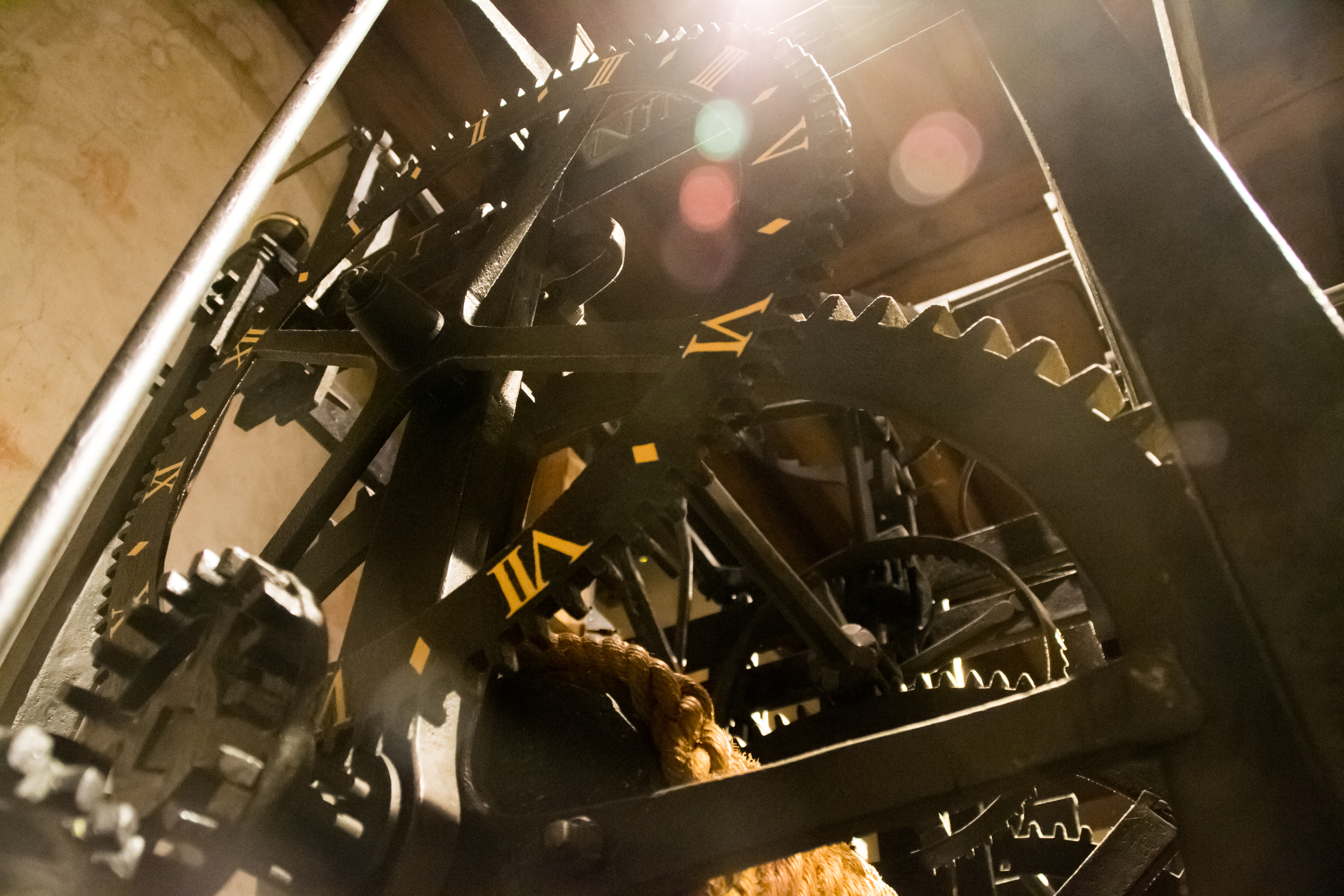
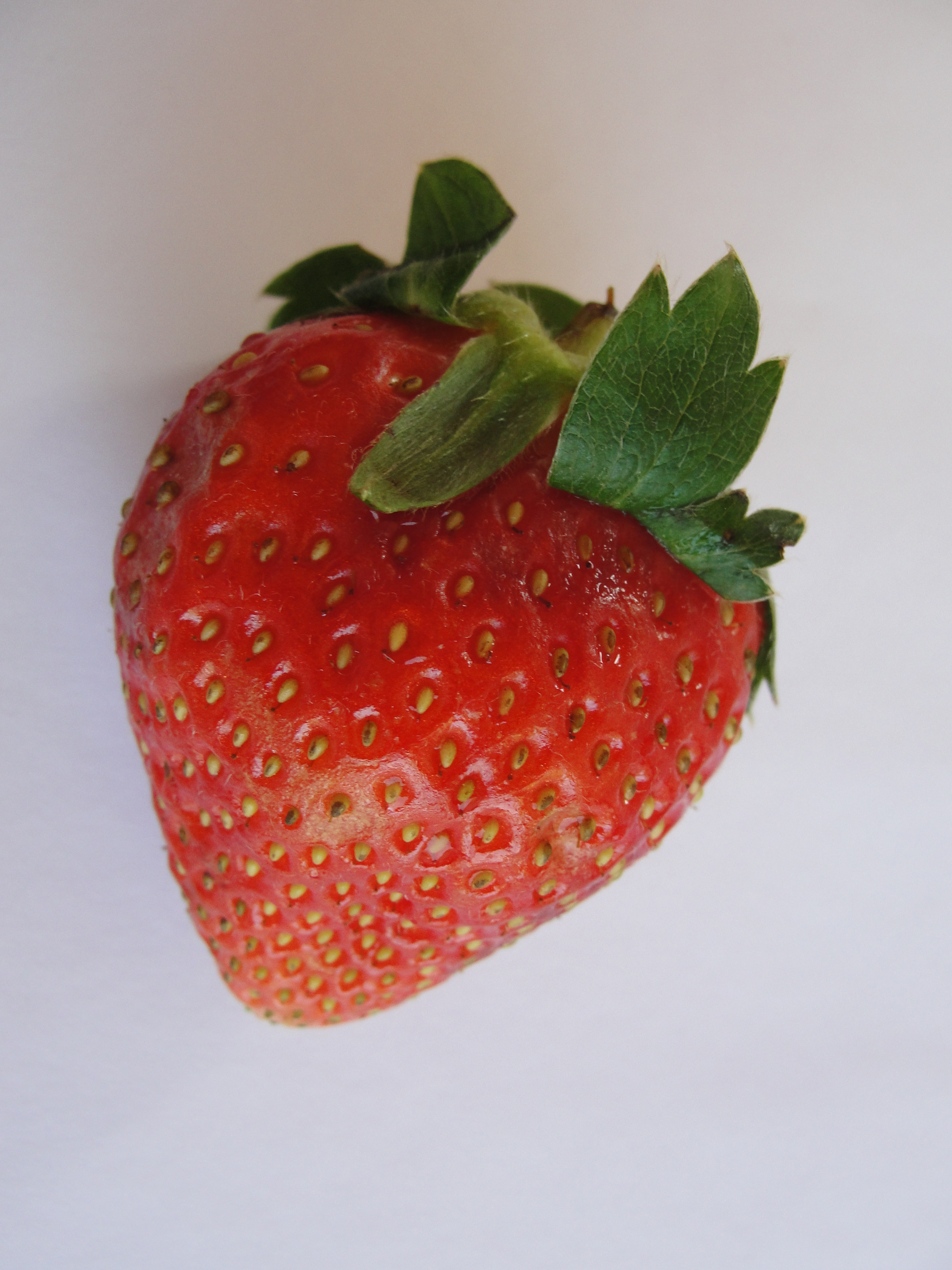
DJ Food used multiple clockwork parts and a single strawberry to create a literal presentation of the album title for the artwork.

The album title, Mr Brubakers Strawberry Alarm Clock, with "Brubakers" spelt without an apostrophe, takes its name from the 1980 prison drama film Brubaker and from 1960s acid rock band Strawberry Alarm Clock, a band who played a role in "the counter-culture's evolution towards the electronic era." Journalists hold different opinions as to whether the album title fits the album; Louise Grey of The Independent called it a "sixties-ish title" which could "deceive" listeners, while Fact magazine feel it matches the "clockwork" feel of the music. DJ Food of Opemind, who felt the title was representative of Maslen going "all psychedelic with her titles," designed the album sleeve, unusually choosing to create a literal representation of the album title. He visited Brick Lane, London, to purchase a large bag of clock parts and a basket of strawberries, and then created a "cage" of clockwork, positioning the strawberry in the centre. Taking his creation into his flat's back garden on a sunny day, he sprayed the strawberry in order to make the fruit appear fresh, and Nancy Brown then photographed this for the front cover.

== Release and reception ==
Professional ratings
Review scores
Source	Rating
AllMusic	3/5 stars
CMJ New Music Monthly	(favourable)

Mr Brubakers Strawberry Alarm Clock was released on 19 October 1998 by Ntone, Ninja Tune's sister label which focused on experimental electronic music. "Ultra Freaky Orange" had already been released as a single in 1997, with its B-sides consisting of numerous remixes of the track. The album charted in several radio airplay charts, including the RPM chart, a chart compiled by CMJ New Music Monthly which combined airplay reports of electronic music from numerous commercial, non-commercial and college radio stations, where it peaked at number 9. In June 1999, the album also reached number 172 on KZSU's radio airplay chart.

In a contemporary review of the album, Keith Farley of AllMusic rated it three stars out of five and felt that "Maslen's way with beats and effects" had not suffered during the producer's absence. Although he commented that the album is "not quite as compulsively listenable as 15 Levels of Magnification," he conceded this was "hardly a drawback" given that album's "uncompromising excellence." Randall Roberts of CMJ New Music Monthly said the album was "one of the most interesting, and beautiful, beat-based records of the year," praising Maslen's attention to detail and "perfect, unique beats." He said it contained "some unidentifiable characteristic" that separated it "from the avalanche of electronic releases." Louise Gray of The Independent felt that the "dark, eerie and multi-layered" album was "the next logical step on from the likes of Massive Attack or Portishead." Thom Dibdin of The List hailed Maslen for making a 'scary', unpredictable record, noting how the ambient introduction gives way to harsher styles.

In 2015, Fact Magazine ranked the album at number 31 in their list of "The 50 Best Trip-Hop Albums of All Time"; the magazine called the album "one of the trip-hop era's hidden gems" and noted it was "one of the few full-lengths on this list that still sound truly bizarre and alien." They said that the album "was probably 'too future' for most beatheads" as Maslen "avoided many of the trappings" of both trip hop and IDM with the album. In 2014, the magazine ranked "Vacetious Blooms" at number 56 in their list of "The 100 greatest IDM tracks." ROCKRGRL said that, like Maslen's other releases, the album was "starkly original." Frank D. Nieto of Motormouthmedia named it as one of his 10 favourite albums of 1998. After the release of the album, Maslen chose to continue pursuing her prolific work ethic and did not take a break, instead promoting the album with tours of United Kingdom and Europe and three Australian gigs, as well as helping Paul Jason Fredrick produce his own album.

== Track listing ==
All tracks written by Maslen except where noted.

1. "Mr Brubakers Strawberry Alarm Clock" – 10:52
2. "Ultra Freaky Orange" – 4:56
3. "Under Violent Objects" – 5:07
4. "Insane Moon" (Maslen, Paul Jason Fredericks) – 4:22
5. "What Will I Do Now" – 1:29
6. "Vacetious Blooms" – 4:32
7. "Beached" – 5:32
8. "Improved Industrial Dwellings" – 5:37
9. "Apple Sauce" – 4:45
10. "Saucer Song" – 4:21
11. "Gutted" (Maslen, Fredericks) – 4:32
12. "You're Grinding Me Down" – 7:13
13. "Sideshow Man" – 3:09
14. "Vent" – 3:58
15. "Cremation" – 4:28

== Personnel ==
Adapted from the liner notes of Mr Brubakers Strawberry Alarm Clock

- Riz Maslen – producer, writing
- Jamie Finch – engineer
- Sean Magee – editing
- Voda – mastering
- Openmind – design
- Mr Orange – other (construction)
- Nancy Brown – photography
- Paul Jason Fredericks – vocals (track 4), writing (tracks 4, 11)
- Nina Barry – vocals (track 11)
- Gary Lucas – guitar (track 14)
