= Kazuko's Karaoke Klub =

Kazuko's Karaoke Klub is a Channel 4 chat show, hosted by Japanese performance artist Kazuko Hohki of the Frank Chickens in which she interviewed celebrity guests who then had to sing karaoke versions of hit songs of the time.

The production company for the programme was called Monkey Games and it aired at prime time on Thursday evenings in 1989. Guests included Spike Milligan, Jimmy Savile, Lynne Perrie, Margi Clarke, Janice Long, John Cooper Clarke, Claire Rayner, Frank Sidebottom and Michael Winner.

== Series overview ==
- Pilot Episode: 28 December 1988 – Paul Boateng MP, Ruby Wax and Sandie Shaw.

=== Series 1 ===
The only series was broadcast on Thursday Evenings during late Spring to early Summer, most episodes were filmed in Glasgow however a few were in Manchester.

- 25 May 1989: George Wendt, Spike Milligan and Jimmy Savile
- 1 June 1989: Eline E Smith, Stuart Anderson and Billy Bragg
- 8 June 1989: Michael Winner, Claire Rayner and Tom Robinson
- 15 June 1989: Janice Long, John Cooper Clarke and Frank Sidebottom,
- 22 June 1989: Magnus Magnusson, Professor Ross Harper and Pam Hogg
- 29 June 1989: Margi Clarke, Jonathan King & Brinsley Forde
- 6 July 1989: Michael Fish and The Dubliners
- 13 July 1989: Gavin Friday, Lynn Perrie
