= Some of My Best Friends Are DJs =

Studio album by Kid Koala
- Released: October 7, 2003
- Genre: Turntablism; hip hop; sound collage
- Length: 34:58
- Label: Ninja Tune
- Producer: Kid Koala

Kid Koala chronology
Carpal Tunnel Syndrome (2000)	Some of My Best Friends Are DJs (2003)	Live from the Short Attention Span Audio Theater Tour!! (2005)

Some of My Best Friends Are DJs is the second studio album by Canadian turntablist Kid Koala, released on Ninja Tune in 2003. It peaked at number 26 on the UK Independent Albums Chart.

== Critical reception ==
Professional ratings
Aggregate scores
Source	Rating
Metacritic	78/100
Review scores
Source	Rating
AllMusic	4.5/5 stars
Alternative Press	4/5
Blender	3/5 stars
Entertainment Weekly	B+
HipHopDX	7/10
Pitchfork	7.4/10
Resident Advisor	4.0/5
Rolling Stone	3/5 stars
Spin	A
The Village Voice	B+

On Metacritic, Some of My Best Friends Are DJs received an average score of 78 out of 100 based on 16 reviews, indicating "generally favorable reviews".

Sam Samuelson of AllMusic gave the album 4.5 stars out of 5, saying: "More subtle than Carpal Tunnel Syndrome, Some of My Best Friends Are DJs shows a serious artist crafting his medium."

In an article for the Los Angeles Times, Susan Carpenter described the album as "sound collage to the extreme, a comedic smorgasbord that makes excellent use of some of the more bizarre spoken-word snippets that have been committed to vinyl over the years."

== Track listing ==
No.	Title	Length
1.	"Strat Hear"	0:05
2.	"Basin Street Blues"	4:47
3.	"Radio Nufonia"	0:51
4.	"Stompin' at Le Savoi"	2:04
5.	"Space Cadet 2"	3:22
6.	"Grandmaphone Speaks"	0:14
7.	"Skanky Panky"	3:23
8.	"Flu Season"	1:10
9.	"Robochacha"	1:45
10.	"Elevator Hopper"	1:35
11.	"Annie's Parlour"	4:02
12.	"On the Set of Fender Bender"	2:21
13.	"More Dance Music"	4:39
14.	"Vacation Island"	4:21
15.	"Negatron Speaks"	0:19

== Charts ==
Chart (2003)	Peak position
UK Independent Albums (OCC)	26
