= Carpal Tunnel Syndrome (album) =

Studio album by Kid Koala
- Released: February 22, 2000
- Genres: Turntablism; electronica; experimental hip hop; trip hop
- Length: 37:52
- Label: Ninja Tune
- Producers: Kid Koala; Bullfrog

Kid Koala chronology
Scratchcratchratchatch (1996)	Carpal Tunnel Syndrome (2000)	Some of My Best Friends Are DJs (2003)

Carpal Tunnel Syndrome is the debut studio album by Canadian turntablist Kid Koala, released on Ninja Tune in 2000. It peaked at number 33 on the UK Independent Albums Chart. It was nominated for Alternative Album of the Year at the 2001 Juno Awards.

== Production ==
Carpal Tunnel Syndrome was made by hand-cutting vinyl records onto an 8-track recorder without computer splicing or samplers. The album took Kid Koala 4 years to record, more than the 6 months he originally told Ninja Tune it would take.

== Critical reception ==
Professional ratings
Review scores
Source	Rating
AllMusic	5/5 stars
Alternative Press	4/5
Muzik	4/5 stars
NME	7/10
Pitchfork	7.6/10
The Rolling Stone Album Guide	4/5 stars
Uncut	4/5 stars
The Village Voice	B+

Steve Huey of AllMusic said: "It's capable of making turntablism engaging to a wider audience." He added, "[Kid Koala is] able to bring so much personality and entertainment value to his work, which makes Carpal Tunnel Syndrome arguably the most appealing turntablist album yet released." Matt Byrnie of PopMatters said, "Kid Koala's real charm is not his virtuosity, per se, but his ability to express the simple joy of playing with records."

In 2018, the album won the Polaris Heritage Prize Jury Award in the 1996–2005 category.

== Track listing ==
No.	Title	Length
1.	"Strut Hear"	0:59
2.	"Nerdball"	1:43
3.	"Fender Bender"	3:54
4.	"Drunk Trumpet"	2:57
5.	"Roboshuffle"	2:40
6.	"Barhopper 1"	1:58
7.	"Music for Morning People"	3:47
8.	"Naptime"	1:34
9.	"A Night at the Nufonia"	3:53
10.	"Temple of Gloom"	4:16
11.	"Scurvy"	4:16
12.	"Like Irregular Chickens"	1:55
13.	"Barhopper 2"	3:13
14.	"Roll Credits"	0:49

== Charts ==
Chart (2000)	Peak position
UK Independent Albums (Official Charts)	33
