= Your Mom's Favorite DJ =

Studio album by Kid Koala
- Released: September 25, 2006
- Studio: The Record Room, Montreal
- Genre: Turntablism, hip hop
- Length: 33:37
- Label: Ninja Tune
- Producer: Kid Koala, The Slew

Kid Koala chronology
Live from the Short Attention Span Audio Theater Tour!! (2005)	Your Mom's Favorite DJ (2006)	12 Bit Blues (2012)

Professional ratings
Review scores
Source	Rating
AllMusic	4/5 stars
Christgau's Consumer Guide	(3-star Honorable Mention)
Okayplayer	3.5/5 stars

Your Mom's Favorite DJ is the third studio album by Canadian turntablist Kid Koala, released on Ninja Tune in 2006. The album features three rock-influenced “Slew Test” tracks that were later included in different, extended form on 100%, the 2009 debut release from Kid Koala’s collaborative band project The Slew.

== Critical reception ==
Marisa Brown of AllMusic gave the album 4 stars out of 5, saying, "as a fun, informative celebration of Koala's decade of work, it's absolutely great." Brian Hull of Okayplayer said, "Your Mom's Favorite DJ is laden with blues, fuzzed out guitars, Dixieland, and more sampled dialogue than most records can boast in lyrics."

David Downs of East Bay Express listed it on his "Best Records of 2006" list.

== Track listing ==
No.	Title	Length
1.	"Left Side" (Start Heeeeears Koala / Stoppin' Traffic / Tracks Etc. / Slew Test 1 / Lunch with Pavlov / Robo-Cookie Factory / Things'll Be Good Again / Dinner at 1:00 A.M. / Party at Eric's!)	14:15
2.	"Right Side" (Slew Test 2 / Gimme a K! / Mosquito vs. Waterbuffalo / Slew Test 3 / Paper Route Days / Nufonia Noise Consultation Committee / The Denouement)	19:17
3.	"Bonus Cricket"	0:05

== Personnel ==
Credits adapted from liner notes.

- Kid Koala – production, turntables, drawing, character
- The Slew – production
- Vid Cousins – mixing
- Sarah Register – mastering
- Sekondhandprojects.com – layout
- Pat Hamou – layout
- Paul Labonté – text, photography
- Louisa Schabas – set, shading
- Ryhna Thompson – management
