= The Red Sun Band =

Australian musical group

- Origin: Sydney, Australia
- Genres: Indie-rock, Dream pop, shoegaze
- Years active: 2001–2009
- Label: Enchanted Recordings
- Past members: Sarah Kelly; Lizzie Kelly; John Matthews; Kate Wilson; David Olliffe; Joe Hammond; Nicholai Danko; Jasper Fenton

The Red Sun Band (styled as theredsunband) were a rock band from Sydney, Australia. For most of the band's run, it was composed of sisters Sarah (guitar, lead vocals) and Lizzie Kelly (keyboards, tambourine, backing vocals), as well as drummer John Matthews.

The band's sound was inspired by acts such as Mazzy Star and Cat Power, both for their production ethic and the treatment of the lead vocals. On the local front, the band received support from the numerous mid-late 1990s Australian bands who played a brand of atmospheric indie-rock informed by the shoegaze movement of the early 1990s, such as Sounds Like Sunset and Gersey, who gave the band their earliest support slots. The Red Sun Band played with such artists as Cat Power, Magic Dirt, Youth Group and The Panics, and were on the bill for the Big Day Out festival in both 2005 and 2009.

== History ==
The band originally played as a two-piece, with Sarah on bass and John Matthews on guitar. Serendipitously, the two founding members of the group had previously met at kindergarten. "In the class photo we are the two kids at the front holding the sign 'Arncliffe West Public School Year Kindi 1986'", wrote Matthews on the band's official site.

The pair performed in two-piece format before the addition of Kate Wilson on drums, who was followed by David O’Leaf (aka David Olliffe, originally of The Vines). Wilson would go on to play with Sydney bands The Laurels and The Holy Soul. The best known line-up of the band came in 2003 after the departure of O’Leaf, with Matthews switching to drums and Kelly to guitar. This made way for the addition of Kelly's younger sister, Lizzie, on keyboards. Not unlike bands such as The Dandy Warhols, early My Bloody Valentine or The Doors, The Red Sun Band employed keyboard bass, rather than electric bass.

The band's debut album Peapod was released in 2004 on Slanted Recordings and produced by Magic Dirt's Dean Turner – credited as Dean Dirt. It was recorded in St. Kilda at Hothouse Studios, the studio of former Kids in the Kitchen bass player Craig Harnath.

On 27 March 2006, Sarah Kelly was awarded the Jessica Michalik Music Endowment by the Australasian Performing Right Association (APRA).

On 24 November 2007 during a show at the Northcote Social Club in Melbourne, Sarah announced that John Matthews had quit the band four days previously. The band went on to perform with drummers Joe Hammond, Nicholai Danko & Jasper Fenton. They released their second studio album, The Shiralee, in 2008.

In 2009, the band separated permanently. Lizzie Kelly moved to Toronto, while Sarah Kelly remained in Australia, forming The Jewel & The Falcon with Patrick Matthews (John Matthews' brother) and later Good Heavens with former Wolfmother members Chris Ross and Myles Heskett. According to Sarah Kelly, the band's separation came as a result of the departure of John Matthews and the death of Dean Turner.

== Discography ==
=== Albums ===
- Peapod, August 2004, Slanted Recordings
- The Shiralee, June 2008, Enchanted Recordings

=== Singles ===
- Pavement (CD single), November 2003, Slanted Recordings
- Sleep Forever (CD single), April 2004, Slanted Recordings
- Devil Song (7 inch single), July 2004, Slanted Recordings
- The Eagle (7 inch single), 2008, The Passport Label

=== EPs ===
- Like An Arrow (CD EP), November 2007, Enchanted Recordings
