= Slugabed (musician) =

- Birth name: Greg Feldwick
- Also known as: gorse panshawe
- Origin: London, England
- Genres: Dubstep; g-funk; experimental
- Occupation: Producer
- Labels: Ninja Tune, Planet Mu

Greg Feldwick, better known by his stage name Slugabed or gorse panshawe is a British electronic music producer based in London, England.

== Life and career ==
Feldwick first started producing music on his PlayStation console at age 16. He later moved on to using FL Studio to produce with use of an external drum sampler.

On 7 May 2012, Feldwick released his debut album Time Team on Ninja Tune, which he claims was inspired by "fannies, pubes and nervousness". Tom Howard from NME described the release as "intergalactic, ambient, Rustie-ish drug music", and Andrew Gaeric from Pitchfork noted musical influences from g-funk and dubstep.

Feldwick has collaborated with Triantafyllidis on Still Life With Platypus for FACT Magazine. The half-hour AV production set explored a wide range of experimental sounds.
