= Frank Chickens =

British-Japanese musical group

Kazuko Hohki (with Tomoko Minamazaki and Ray Hogan) in rehearsal with Frank Chickens in 1998

Frank Chickens are a Japanese musical group based in London, who have performed songs mainly in English since 1982.

They were nominated for the 1984 Edinburgh Comedy Award for their performance at the Edinburgh Festival Fringe. In the same year, their single "Blue Canary" was number 42 in BBC DJ John Peel's Festive Fifty, a poll of his listeners' favourite tracks of the year. The band recorded 28 songs over five sessions for Peel between 1983 and 1989.

In 1989 they hosted a television chat show on Channel 4 entitled Kazuko's Karaoke Klub.

One of the founders of the group, Kazuko Hohki, performs as a theatre artist and performance artist. She also sang with the group Kahondo Style who released 'My Heart’s In Motion' (1985) and 'Green Tea and Crocodiles' (1987). She is married to record producer Grant Showbiz.

In 2010 the group won the Foster's Edinburgh Comedy God Award, after the public responded to an e-mail sent in anger by comedian Stewart Lee to the organisers of the award.

The band was named by Kazuko Hohki after a brand of Japanese pencil.

== Discography ==
Singles

- "We Are Ninja" / "Fujiyamamama", (Kaz 1984)
- "We Are Ninja (Not Geisha)", (Kaz 1984)
- "Blue Canary", (Kaz 1984)
- "Blue Canary" (12"), (Kaz 1984)
- "Yellow Toast", (Kaz 1987)
- "Do the Karaoke" / "Jackie Chan", (Kaz 1989)
- "Annabella" / "Different", (Eggy Pop 1996)
- "We Are Ninja Remix Collection ", (Ninja Tune 2000)

Albums

- We Are Frank Chickens, (Kaz 1984)
- Get Chickenized, (Flying Lecords 1987)
- The Best of Frank Chickens, (Kaz 1987) (reissue of We Are Frank Chickens contains 5 additional tracks, including "Fujiyamamama" and "Blue Canary")
- Club Monkey, (Flying Lecords 1988)
- Pretty Frank Chickens, (Chico Chica 1992) [only released in Japan]
- Yukasita – Underfloor World, (Creative Man Disc/Toy's Factory 1994)

Compilations

- Shellfish Bamboo appeared on Mad Mix II, a compilation cassette tape given away with the New Musical Express in 1983
- The 90 Days - The Original Soundtrack, (1992) Contributed 3 tracks.
- Xen Cuts (Ninja Tune 2000), contained new version of "We Are Ninja (Not Geisha)".
- What Would This Record Have Sounded Like If John Cale Had Had Some Setback And Cinzia La Fauci And Alberto Scotti Had Taken His Place (Snowdonia 2003), "Not Right" (1 track contribution to Stooges cover album)
- "Blue Canary" appears on the compilation album Kat's Karavan: The History Of John Peel On The Radio.
