= Space Cadet (graphic novels) =

Space Cadet is a 2011 graphic novel written by Kid Koala, and was released on September 19 in the UK and Europe, and October 25 in North America. Like his previous graphic novel, Nufonia Must Fall, Space Cadet comes with a soundtrack CD. Drawn completely on etchboards, the story is about a female astronaut and was inspired by the birth of Kid Koala's daughter Maple.

In 2025, the graphic novel was adapted into a Canadian animated film Space Cadet directed by Kid Koala himself in his directorial debut.
