= Scratchcratchratchatch =

Mixtape by Kid Koala
- Released: November 1996
- Genre: Turntablism, hip hop
- Length: 30:02
- Label: Ninja Tune

Kid Koala chronology
Scratchcratchratchatch (1996)	Carpal Tunnel Syndrome (2000)

Professional ratings
Review scores
Source	Rating
AllMusic	link

Scratchcratchratchatch is the debut mixtape of turntablist Kid Koala. There were reports of only 500 copies released initially, but it was picked up by Ninja Tune records. They continue to sell it in its original format as a cassette tape. Due to heavy use of unlicensed samples, the cassette has a label with 'for promotional use only' printed on it.

== Track listing ==
Side A:

1. "Start Hear"
2. "Emperors Crash Course In Cantonese"
3. "Tubanjo"
4. "The Prank Call"
5. "Dinner With Yoda"
6. "Statics Waltz (Lo-Fi Version)"
7. "Tricks N' Treats"
8. "Made From Björk"

Side B:

1. "Made From Scratch"
2. "Capone's Theme Park"
3. "Fashion Lesson"
4. "Medieval Retrowax"
5. "Jhaptal"
6. "Taboo Soda"
7. "Almost Easy Listening"
8. "The Mushroom Factory"
9. "Thank You, Good Night, Drive Safely"
