= Space Cadet (2025 film) =

2025 Canadian animated film

- Film poster
- Directed by: Kid Koala
- Written by: Mylène Chollet
- Produced by: Ginette Petit; Michel Pradier
- Edited by: Corinne Merrell; Alain Baril
- Music by: Eric San
- Layouts by: Corinne Merrell
- Production company: Les Film Outsiders
- Distributed by: Sphere Films International
- Release dates: February 16, 2025 (Berlinale); November 13, 2026 (United States)
- Running time: 86 minutes
- Country: Canada

Space Cadet is a 2025 Canadian animated film directed by Kid Koala in his directorial debut from his 2011 graphic novel of the same name. Adapted for film by Mylène Chollet, it is a dialogue-free musical fable about a young astronaut and her guardian robot which explores grief, loss and love across generations. The film is a tomorrow-days lullaby about finding your place in the universe.

The film had its world premiere at the 75th Berlin International Film Festival on 16 February 2025 in the Generation Kplus section. It will be released in select US theatres on 13 November 2026, by Viva Pictures.

== Plot ==
Astronaut Stella Astridia acquires a Guardian Robot to help raise her daughter, Celeste. But Stella is lost in a mission, and so the Guardian bot must raise Celeste on its own. Celeste and the Bot form a deep bond; they frequently compete with each other at origami.

Celeste eventually graduates and becomes an astronaut herself. She is assigned a mission to retrieve plant life from other planets. She leaves the Guardian bot a gift of a paint set. The bot spends its time alone eagerly learning to paint, starting with still lifes. But due to its age, the Guardian bot is increasingly unable to maintain its full memory base. But its memories of important moments in the lives of both it and Celeste are so precious that the bot refuses to delete them, even though their maintenance makes the bot more inoperative.

Celeste collects various plant samples. But she picks up a signal coming from an area in space forbidden to exploration; a signal her mother cited in her notes. Determined to track the source of the signal, Celeste enters the forbidden region and finds a planet filled with cephalapod-like monsters that eat energy. The monsters make Celeste's ship crash, but the ship can recharge using solar panels. On the planet she finds a plant resembling a venus flytrap. This plant makes the signal when it emits bubbles of energy that the monsters eat. Celeste finds that when she plays a tune on her xylophone she can induce the plant to emit a bubble. So she uses her origami skills to make giant horns on her ship. Once the ship is powered up, she plays the music through the horns, making all the plants emit a huge number of bubbles. The monsters go after the bubbles, allowing her to escape.

Celeste returns home only to find the Guardian bot has stopped working. Robot doctors are unable to fix it. At home, she discovers that the Guardian bot was able to make paintings of all its precious memories of her. Celeste tearfully brings the Bot to the robot recycling center. But the people there tell her that she can donate the Bot to a charity, where they will repair and reprogram the Bot to be a new Guardian bot for a child in need. Celeste selects a girl who has similar interests to her and donates the Bot to her.

Months later, the girl sends a package to Celeste. The Guardian Bot no longer has its old memories, but it continues to paint, and has painted many moments of its time with the new girl. Celeste now brings the Bot's paintings with her on missions. At the memorial of her mom, Celeste leaves an origami version of the Guardian Bot.

== Production ==
Production began in 2023 with an expected completion date in late 2024. About the film, Eric San said, "The story is told through the lens of guardian and child, technology and humankind, past and present. It touches on themes of connectivity and everyone’s innate power to evolve."He added, Space Cadet is on ode to love and life... a tomorrow-days lullaby about finding your place in the universe." "Space Cadet is a testament to the power of quiet, shared moments."

== Release ==
The film had its World premiere in the Generation Kplus section of the 75th Berlin International Film Festival on 16 February 2025.

Canada’s Sphere Films International acquired the sales rights of film, and will release it in Canada.

The film competed in the Contrechamp competition at the 2025 Annecy International Animation Film Festival held in June 2025. Space Cadet had its North American premiere at the 2025 Toronto International Film Festival on 11 September 2025 in the Centrepiece section.

It opened the 2025 Festival du nouveau cinéma on 8 October 2025. It was screened in the 'Special screening Section' of the 70th Valladolid International Film Festival.

In February 2026, it was presented for its United States premiere in the feature films section of the 41st Santa Barbara International Film Festival.

It was released in select U.S. theaters on November 13, 2026.

== Reception ==
The film was named to the Toronto International Film Festival's annual year-end Canada's Top Ten list for 2025.

== Accolades ==
Award	Ceremony date	Category	Recipient(s)	Result	Ref(s)
Berlin International Film Festival	23 February 2025	Generation Kplus Crystal Bear for Best Feature Film	Kid Koala	Nominated	
2025 Annecy International Animation Film Festival	14 June 2025	Contrechamp Competition	Kid Koala	Nominated	
Toronto Film Critics Association	2 March 2026	Best Animated Film	Kid Koala	Runner-up	
Rendez-vous Québec Cinéma	2026	Youth Jury Prize (Prix du jury en herbe)	Kid Koala	Won	
