= 9 Lazy 9 =

Italian electronic music group

9 Lazy 9 is an Italian electronic music group, consisting of Keir Fraser, James Braddell, Gianluca Petrella (trombone), Mishael Levron (guitar), Manù Bandettini (flute) and Adriano Tirelli (bassoon). Keir Fraser is credited as Keir Fraserello. James Braddell is a.k.a. Funki Porcini, performing under the guise of Giacomo Braddellini.

== Discography ==
=== Albums ===
- Paradise Blown (1994, Ninja Tune, ZEN9/ZENCD9, 2xLP/CD)
- Electric Lazyland (1994, Ninja Tune, ZEN14/ZENCD14, 2xLP/CD)
- The Herb (1995, Shadow, SDW002-2, CD)
- Sweet Jones (2003, Ninja Tune, ZEN79/ZENCD79, LP/CD)
- Bedsofaland (2009, self-released via Bandcamp)
- Serpentine (2022, self-released via Bandcamp)
- Jam 9 (2024, self-released via Bandcamp)
- Tormentone (2026, self-released via Bandcamp)

=== Singles ===
- "Take Nine" (1993, Ninja Tune, ZEN1217, 12")
- "In the Mood" (as 8 Lazy Bastards) (1993, Beat Bop, BBOP 003, 12")
- "Black Jesus" (1994, Ninja Tune, ZEN1222, 12")
- "Electric Lazyland (Journeyman Mix)" (1995, Ninja Tune, ZEN1238, 12")
- "Try This Rhythm" (2020, self-released via Bandcamp)

=== Compilation appearances ===
- "Train (Marden Hill Remix)" on Ninja Cuts - Funkjazztical Tricknology (1995, Ninja Tune, ZEN15/ZEN15R/ZENCD15, 2xLP/3xLP/CD)

=== Remixes ===
- Cybophonia - "Azona Pop (9 Lazy 9 Remix)" on Azona Pop (2001, Irma Records/Irma On Canvas, IC 201, 12")
- Pressure Drop - "Back2Back (Surya vs 9 Lazy 9 Remix)" on Food of Love (2001, One Eye, 1I LP001, 3x12")
- Funki Porcini - "Six Minutes in Manchester (9 Lazy 9 Mix)" (2011, self-released via Bandcamp)
- Funki Porcini - "The Devil Drives (9 Lazy 9 Mix)" (2011, self-released via Bandcamp)
- Funki Porcini - "Things Gettin' Rough (9 Lazy 9 Mix)" (2019, self-released via Bandcamp)
- Funki Porcini - "Studio Five (9 Lazy 9 Remix)" (2019, self-released via Bandcamp)
