= Si Begg =

English EDM DJ, musician and record producer

- Also known as: Buckfunk 3000, Cabbage Boy, S.I. Futures
- Born: Simon Begg; 1972 (age 53–54); Leicester, England
- Genres: Electronic dance music
- Occupations: Record producer, DJ
- Years active: 1993–present
- Labels: Caipirinha; Novamute; Ntone
- Website: www.SiBegg.com

Si Begg (born 1972) is an English electronic dance music DJ, musician and record producer. His recording career began in 1993 and he has used a number of different pseudonyms and band names, and released music in different styles on several record labels.

He has also recorded music for short films, television advertisements and video games and has performed sound design work for television channels including the BBC, Channel 4 and MTV. Most recently he has provided the soundtrack for the hit Netflix sitcom Lovesick.

== History ==
Si Begg studied at Trinity School and Mid Warwickshire college, becoming interested in electronic music from an early age. Begg confessed that the first electronic-based record he ever heard was "Probably Jean Michel Jarre; my uncle used to be into his stuff, and used to play it in the car. My brother's mate's dad also had Tubular Bells and stuff like that. I remember being really into all the sounds and noises, the total futurism. And I was right into Star Wars and Tron and all those kinda kids' sci-fi things."

Listening to John Peel's BBC Radio 1 show in the late 1980s, Begg was introduced to early Chicago acid. This influenced him to move away from playing guitar and drums with schoolmates and toward creating cut-up electronica with fellow electronic musicians, under the group name Cabbage Head Collective.

== Career ==
Begg initially gained experience working as a sound engineer in the early 1990s, helping to produce live music and studio albums for other artists, and began DJing in 1991. He began creating his own music in 1993, and a year later, released 3 EPs with techno artist and fellow Cabbage Head alumni Cristian Vogel, under the band name "Inevitable Technology". The pair later founded a record company, Mosquito, in 1997. During this time, Begg assembled a recording studio (which is now located in Harrow, in northwest London), and learned about A&R and label management.

He moved to London in the 1990s. Begg's works as Cabbage Boy were subsequently released on their Ninja Tune sub-label, Ntone. Begg released his solo debut album Commuter World on Caipirinha Productions in 1998. He continued to release 12" singles on a variety of small independent record labels (including his own).

In 2001, he released The Mission Statement on the Mute Records subsidiary Novamute, going by the name of as S. I. Futures. This was followed by another Si Begg album, Director's Cut (2003)

Since 2005, he has also released mp3 files on Digital Distortions and further singles on another label that he founded himself, Noodles Recordings and its sub-labels, Noodles Institute of Technology and Noodles Discothèque, which he called "the stupidest recording organisation in the world". The description comes from the fact that the label releases such a wide variety of musical styles, a tactic most labels would avoid.

In addition to working as a recording artist, he also performs live DJ sets throughout Europe. He currently has two DJ residencies in London, Big Beat Boutique at Scala and Freakin the Frame at The End. He has also worked as a remixer.

Begg's compositions have been featured in films, TV shows and trailers placed by Elephant Music.

== Pseudonyms and collaborations ==
Begg has recorded under variety of names, both as a solo artist and in collaboration with other artists. He explains that it is a "necessity because of the way the industry kind of works. Because a lot of people want exclusive names and there's just no way I could. If there was one label that I felt was my home and I didn't want to do stuff for other labels then that would be fine, but no single label is willing to release my full output – my full kind of range. So I have to come up with these different projects all the time.",

Solo recording names include:

- Si Begg
- Bigfoot
- Bigfoot Futures Ltd
- Buckfunk 3000
- Cabbage Boy / Cabbageboy
- Culture Cruncher
- Dr. Nowhere versus The Maverick DJ
- Lenny Logan / Lenny "The Stylus" Logan (one Lenny Logan track featured "Zygmunt Janowski", who, again, is actually Si Begg)
- S. I. Futures

Band names include:

- Bigfoot & Maverick DJ
- Cabbage Head Collective (with Cristian Vogel, Tim Wright (of Germ, Neil Landstrumm and Anthony Michael Alexander)
- Inevitable Technology (with Cristian Vogel)
- State of the Art (with Tony Thorpe of The Moody Boys)
