= Zero dB =

zero dB
- Genres: Hard Jazz; Hip Hop; Broken beat Brazilian
- Occupation(s): Record producer DJ; Artist
- Years active: 2000 – present
- Labels: Fluid Ounce Records; Ninja Tune

zero-dB specialty is Hard Jazz, Hip Hop, Broken beat, Brazilian trip hop. They signed to Ninja Tune and are associated with artists like Mr Scruff and the Herbaliser, Roots Manuva. They began producing music in 2000, when they released their first album, EP Party Girl. The artists' popularity increased as the group zero-dB toured across Asia, America and Europe.

== Discography ==
- Party Girl (2000)
- Bongos, Bleeps and Basslines (2006)
- Heavyweight Gringos LP (2008)
