= FaltyDL =

American electronic musician and producer

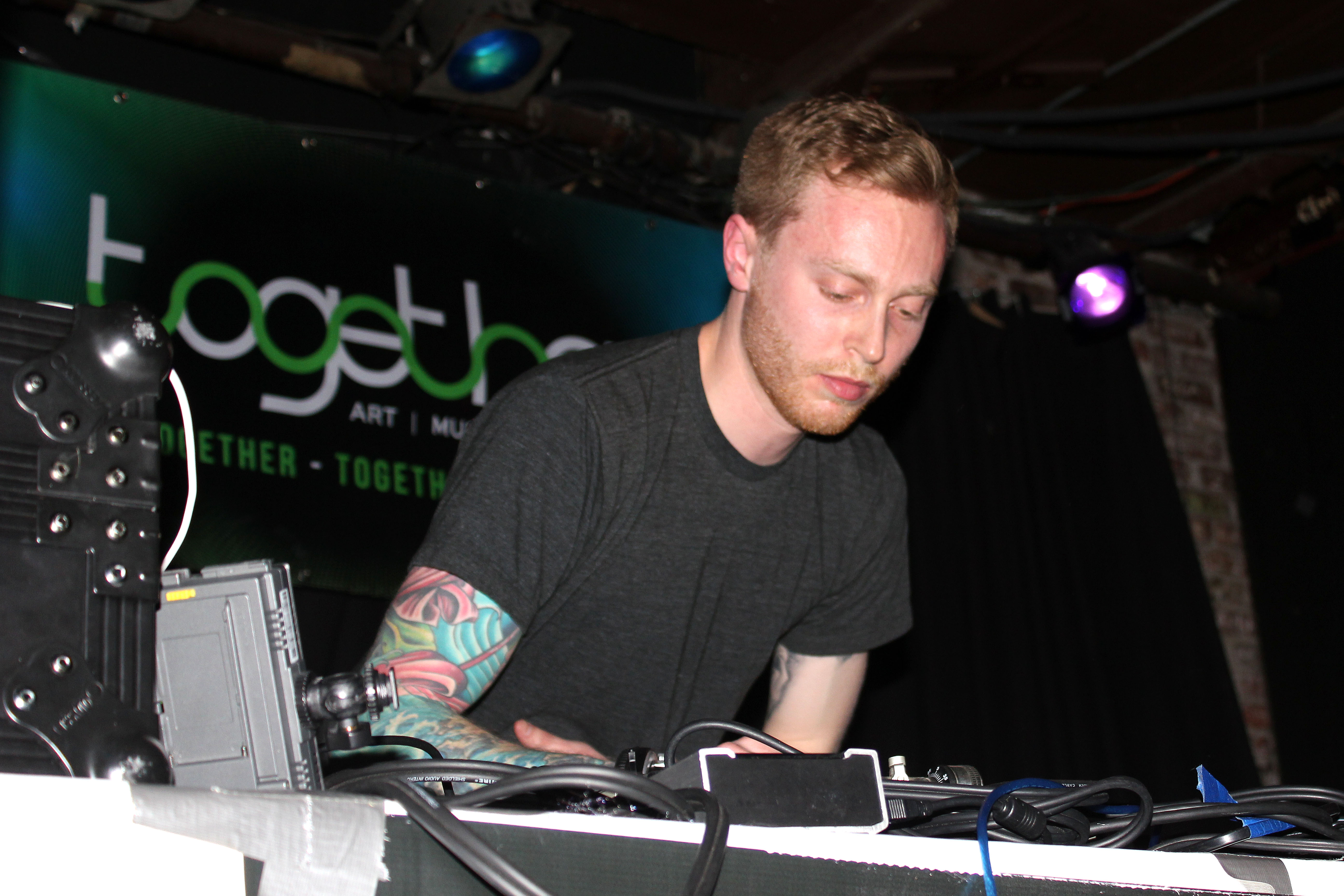
- April 5, 2012 on Together Festival, Boston

Background information
- Birth name: Andrew "Drew" Lustman
- Born: May 13, 1983 (age 42) New Haven, Connecticut, United States
- Origin: New Haven, Connecticut, United States
- Genres: House, UK garage, electronica, experimental, techno
- Occupation(s): Record producer, DJ
- Instrument(s): Keyboard, Samples
- Years active: 2007-present
- Labels: Ninja Tune, Planet Mu, Hypercolour
- Website: faltydl.tumblr.com

Drew Lustman (born May 13, 1983), also known as FaltyDL, is an American, New York-based record producer and electronic musician originally from New Haven, Connecticut.

In November 2008, he signed with electronic music label Planet Mu, who released his first two full-length albums, Love Is A Liability (2009) and You Stand Uncertain (2011). In January 2011, he signed with London-based label Ninja Tune, who released Atlantis (2011) and the single Straight & Arrow (2012), which features a remix by Four Tet. His third album, Hardcourage, was co-released on January 21, 2013, through Ninja Tune and his own record label, Blueberry Records. The label was named after the blueberry hill his grandmother owned. His fourth album In the Wild (2014) was also released by Ninja Tune. In 2015 he released The Crystal Cowboy under his own name for Planet Mu Records. In Fall 2016 he released his latest full-album Heaven Is for Quitters exclusively through Blueberry Records. His current newest release is If All the People Took Acid - EP, released January 2019.

FaltyDL has remixed tracks for Seun Kuti, Mount Kimbie, The xx, Scuba, Photek, Anthony Shake Shakir, and opened for Radiohead's show at Roseland Ballroom in September 2011.

FaltyDL is known for performing on stage with his MacBook

== Discography ==
Albums

- Neurotica (Planet Mu, 2025)
- In The Wake Of Wolves (CPU Records, 2024)
- A Nurse To My patience (Blueberry, 2022)
- Heaven Is for Quitters (Blueberry, 2016)
- The Crystal Cowboy (Planet Mu, 2015)
- In the Wild (Ninja Tune, 2014)
- Hardcourage (Ninja Tune, 2013)
- You Stand Uncertain (Planet Mu, 2011)
- Love Is a Liability (Planet Mu, 2009)

Singles & EPs

- "Our House Is Barnhus" (Studio Barnhus, 2023)
- "The Wrath EP" (Studio Barnhus, 2021)
- "Recluse Let Loose" (Blueberry, 2020)
- "Flechazo" (Studio Barnhus, 2019)
- "One For UTTU EP" (Unknown To The Unknown, 2019)
- "If All the People Took Acid EP" (Blueberry, 2019)
- "Taste of Acid EP" (Hypercolour, 2018)
- "Three Rooms EP" (Hypercolour, 2018)
- "Wondering Mind" (Aus Music, 2017)
- "Mean Streets Part Three" (Swamp 81, 2016)
- "River Girl / Do You Box?" (Blueberry, 2015)
- "Visceral" (Ninja Tune, 2015)
- "Rich Prick Poor Dick" (Ninja Tune, 2015)
- "Danger" (Ninja Tune, 2014)
- "She Sleeps (Part 1)" (Ninja Tune, 2013)
- Straight & Arrow (Ninja Tune, 2012)
- Hardcourage (Ninja Tune, 2012)
- Mean Streets Part Two (Swamp 81, 2012)
- Atlantis (Ninja Tune, 2011)
- Make It Difficult (All City, 2011)
- Hip Love (Ramp, 2011)
- Mean Streets Part One (Swamp 81, 2011)
- Endeavour (Planet Mu, 2010)
- All in the Place (Rush Hour Current Direct, 2010)
- Phreqaflex (Planet Mu, 2010)
- To London (Ramp, 2009)
- Bravery EP (Planet Mu, 2009)
- Party (Ramp, 2009)
- Rapidly Harvested Asparagus EP (Napalm Enema, 2007)
- Beat Lumber (Unfun, 2007)
- Callipygian Female Flattery (fizx, 2007)

Remixes

- "Closer" by Vondelpark (band) (R&S Records, 2014)

== Films and animations ==
- Drugs (feat. Rosie Lowe) (2016)
- Wolves (2015)
- Watch a Man Die (2015)
- New Haven (2014)
- Dionysos Short Film (2014)
- Straight & Arrow (2012)
- My Light, My Love (2011)
- Dionysos Visualization (2011)
