= Funki Porcini =

English musician and film maker

- Born: James Patrick Darcy Braddell; 13 October 1959 (age 66); London, England
- Genres: Downtempo, trip hop, electronic
- Occupations: Musician, filmmaker
- Years active: 1983–present
- Labels: Ninja Tune; Shadow Records; Sideburn Recordings; Crippled Dick Hot Wax!
- Website: Official website

James Patrick Darcy Braddell (born 15 April 1962) is an English musician and filmmaker who uses the stage name of Funki Porcini. "Funki Porcini" is a twist on "Funghi Porcini", the Italian name of the mushroom Boletus edulis, commonly known as "penny bun".

He spent ten years in Italy making music for film and television. Thereafter, he returned to England. In 1994, he signed to independent record label Ninja Tune and set up his own studio, The Uterus Goldmine.

He has also recorded as a member of 9 Lazy 9 (a.k.a. 8 Lazy Bastards), under the pseudonym Giacomo Braddellini; and released the EP "Float On" (1995), as a member of short-lived band Purr, along with DJ N4Eric (a.k.a. Toona) and Stuart Warren-Hill of Hexstatic.

== Discography ==
- Hed Phone Sex (1995, Ninja Tune)
- Love, Pussycats and Carwrecks (1996, Ninja Tune)
- The Ultimately Empty Million Pounds (1999, Ninja Tune)
- Fast Asleep (2002, Ninja Tune)
- Plod (2009, Independent)
- On (2010, Ninja Tune)
- One Day (2011, Independent)
- Le Banquet Cassio (2013, Independent)
- Conservative Apocalypse (2016, Independent)
- The Mulberry Files (2018, Independent)
- Studio 59 (2019, Independent)
- Boredom Never Looked So Good (2020, Independent)
- Motorway (2020, Independent)
- Drift To This (2021, Independent)
- Where the Sauce is Deluxe (2022, Independent)
- Incredible Vinyl (2023, Independent)
- Modern Hymns for Modern Things (2025, Independent)
