= The Slew =

Multinational electronic music group

- Years active: 2009
- Members: Kid Koala; Dynomite D Chris Ross; Myles Heskett

The Slew is a multinational rock-influenced electronic music project consisting of Canadian turntablist Kid Koala, American producer Dynomite D, and Australian rock musicians Chris Ross and Myles Heskett, formerly of the band Wolfmother.

== History ==
The group first came together in 2005, when Kid Koala and Dynomite D were approached to compose music for the soundtrack to a documentary film by filmmaker Jay Rowlands. The film eventually fell through, but the group continued to collaborate on music, and released an album, 100%, in 2009, which features an "oddly fascinating blend of funky samples and vintage rockism" as well as some uncredited, possibly sampled vocals. The album includes several tracks that were first featured in different form on the 2006 Kid Koala album Your Mom's Favorite DJ.

The group went on a tour of nine cities to promote the album. The live shows were a combination of turntable work from the two DJs and high energy rock performance from the former Wolfmother members.

In 2010, the Slew performed at the Vancouver International Jazz Festival. Also in 2010, it was reported that the band was at work on a second album and had enlisted Mike Patton and Jon Spencer to contribute vocals.

== Discography ==
- 100% (2009, Puget Sounds)
