= Nufonia Must Fall =

2003 graphic novel by Kid Koala

- Author: Kid Koala
- Genre: Science fiction
- Publisher: ECW Press
- Publication date: April 2003
- ISBN: 1-55022-558-8

Nufonia Must Fall is a graphic novel written by turntablist Kid Koala. The book is accompanied by a CD soundtrack, produced by Kid Koala. It is published by ECW Press.

== Summary ==
The plot involves an older model of robot falling in love with a human woman while dealing with his obsolescence and his jobs being replaced with a newer model of robot. The graphic novel is 300 pages long, drawn in monochrome, and has no dialogue.

== Live performance ==
Due to the success of the book, the author Kid Koala developed a live show where the characters are played by puppets accompanied by live music.
