= Animals on Wheels =

- Born: Andrew Coleman
- Genres: Intelligent dance music
- Occupation: Record producer
- Label: Ninja Tune
- Website: animalsonwheels.co.uk

Animals on Wheels is the stage name of Andrew Coleman, an electronic musician based in Cambridge.

Coleman collaborated with Adam Butler (a.k.a. Vert) to form Bovinyl, an independent record label, and released his first EP, Baits Bite, in 1996. The EP is named after Bates Bite lock on the River Cam where Coleman lived and produced music on his houseboat.

In 1997, he signed with Ninja Tune and released another EP, Cooked EP. He then went on to release various albums and EPs including Designs and Mistakes in 1997 on Ninja Tune; and Nuvol I Cadira in 1999 also on Ninja Tune. He released material on other labels as well. He published the EP Dummy on the LaMadameAvecLaChien label in 2009.

Coleman collaborated with Mike King (a.k.a. iCON the Mic King / MiC K!NG) under the name Robots with Hearts.

Since 2012, Coleman has been releasing tracks regularly on his SoundCloud account.
