= Jimpster =

- Born: Jamie Odell
- Origin: Braintree, Essex, United Kingdom
- Genres: Deep house, house, jungle, acid jazz, electronica
- Occupations: Producer, DJ
- Years active: 1997–present
- Website: www.myspace.com/jimpster

Jimpster (a.k.a. Audiomontage, a.k.a. Franc Spangler, real name Jamie Odell) is a British deep house producer and DJ. Together with Tom Roberts, he founded the labels Freerange Records and Delusions of Grandeur. While producing his own tracks and playing live shows, Jimpster has also worked on remixes, including a remix of the song 400 years by Bob Marley.

== Biography ==
Born into a musical family, Jimpster was influenced and encouraged by his father Roger Odell who is the drummer in the jazz-funk band Shakatak. It was there that he was first exposed to electronic synthesizers and recording equipment at around age 10. He also has two children named Stan & Spike (Aged 16 & 13) He started Freerange records in 1996, a label that has since found a niche in deep house with artists like Shur-I-Kan and Milton Jackson. Jimpster played in a live electronica band, The Bays, from 2002 until 2007, but eventually decided to focus on djing and his record label.

In 2007, his label Freerange was voted Best British Label by DJ Mag, in 2010 he won the Beatport titles: Best Deep House Producer and Best Deep House Remix of the year.

== Discography ==
=== Studio albums ===
- Martian Arts (1997), Instinct Ambient
- Messages From the Hub (1999), Kudos
- Live At Soundofspeed (2000), Soundofspeed
- Domestic Science (2002), Kudos
- Amour (2006), Freerange Records
- Porchlight and Rocking Chairs (2013), Freerange Records
- Silent Stars (2017), Freerange Records

=== Singles and EPs ===
- Initial EP (1996), Freerange Records
- Interconnect EP (1997), Kudos
- Deepdown EP (2001), Kudos
- Martian Arts (1996), Freerange Records
- Perennial Pleasures (1997), Kudos
- Seeing Is Believing (2000), Kudos
- State of Mind (2002), Kudos
- Armour LP Sampler (2006), Freerange
- Square Up (2006), Buzzin' Fly Records
- Dangly Panther (2008), Freerange Records
- Sleeper (2009), Freerange Records
- Forever And A Day EP (2010), Delusions of Grandeur
- Painted Lady EP (2014), Delusions of Grandeur
- The Sun Comes Up (2017), Freerange
- Crave (2017), Freerange
- Burning Up / Becoming Cyclonic (2018), Burn
- Curve EP (2018), Freerange

=== Compilations ===
- Special Double Artist Ten Inch Set (1997), Instinct Ambient
- Scrambled (2000), Shadow Records
