= Riz Maslen =

English electronic musician

Riz Maslen is an English electronic musician. During the mid-1990s, she worked with 4hero and Future Sound of London. After playing keyboards for the Beloved, she took out a loan, built a home studio and created her first albums there. In 1995, she signed as Neotropic under the label Ntone and soon after as Small Fish with Spine to Oxygen Music Works in New York. She continues to be a prominent figure in experimental electronic music.

== Discography ==
=== Neotropic ===
- Tumble Weed EP - N-Tone - 1995
- 15 Levels of Magnification LP - N-Tone - 1995
- Laundrophonic EP - N-Tone - 1996
- 15 Levels of Magnification Remixes EP - N-Tone - 1997
- Ultra Freaky Orange EP - N-Tone - 1998
- Mr Brubaker's Strawberry Alarm Clock LP - N-Tone - 1998 (Fact Magazine ranked the album at 31 on its list of "The 50 Best Trip-Hop Albums of All Time" in 2015)
- La Prochaine Fois LP - N-Tone - 2001
- "Sunflower Girl" 7" - N-Tone - 2002
- White Rabbits LP - Mush - 2004
- Prestatyn EP - Council Folk Recordings - 2006
- Whiter Rabbits 2 x LP - Squids Eye Records - 2008
- Equestrienne LP - Council Folk Recordings - 2009

=== Small Fish with Spine ===
- Stickleback EP - Oxide - 1996
- The Hilltop EP - Apollo - 1996
- Fugu EP - Oxide - 1996
- I Hate Your Remixes EP - Oxide - 1996
- Fugu Remixed EP - Oxide - 1996
- Ultimate Sushi LP - Oxide - 1999

=== Remix work ===
Tracks by Mantronik, Low, Frank Chickens, Sky Crys Mary, DJ Food, Ekko, Mich Gerber, Skinny Puppy, Ulver, Thread, Fujiya & Miyagi and papercutz.

== Filmography ==
- Dish - written and directed by Meloni Poole, Film Four and Film Council. Shown at London Film Festival 2001 and competition at International Film Festivals.
- Remote Control - Kohoutek documentary at various film events around London.
- Murder in Paradise - documentary for Channel 4 broadcast early 2002.
- La Prochaine Fois - directed Riz Maslen, shown at Leeds film festival 2000, Pompidou Centre in Paris 2000 and Sundance Film Festival 2002.
- Vigilarie - Riz Maslen and Kaffe Matthews. A film about surveillance as part of the Future Sonic Festival in Manchester 2001, FutureSonic Tour 2004 Bristol / Birmingham / Liverpool.

=== Videogame work ===
Maslen also provided vocals to the Grand Theft Auto: Liberty City Stories soundtrack.
