= Kid Koala =

Canadian DJ and musician

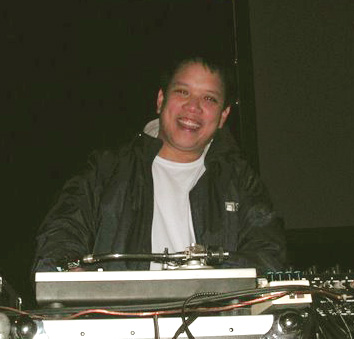
- Kid Koala in 2007

Background information
- Born: Eric Yick Keung San; December 5, 1974 (age 51)
- Origin: Vancouver, British Columbia, Canada
- Genres: Turntablism; electronica; experimental hip hop; trip hop
- Occupations: DJ
- Instruments: Turntables
- Labels: Ninja Tune; Arts & Crafts Productions
- Member of: Deltron 3030; The Slew
- Formerly of: Lovage
- Website: kidkoala.com

Eric Yick Keung San (born December 5, 1974), better known by his stage name Kid Koala, is a Canadian scratch DJ, music producer, theatre producer, film composer, multimedia-performer and visual artist. His career began as a scratch DJ in 1994. Kid Koala works with genres as eclectic as hip hop, ambient, alternative, contemporary classical, blues, classic rock, and traditional jazz. He has released 5 solo albums on Ninja Tune, and 3 on Arts & Crafts Records, the most recent being Music to Draw To: IO featuring Trixie Whitley. He has also released two award-winning graphic novels: Nufonia Must Fall and Space Cadet. He has been a member of Deltron 3030, Lovage, and the Slew, and has collaborated with artists such as Gorillaz and the Afiara String Quartet.

Kid Koala has toured with Radiohead, Beastie Boys, Arcade Fire, Money Mark, A Tribe Called Quest, Mike Patton, DJ Shadow and the Preservation Hall Jazz Band. He has contributed to scores for the films The Great Gatsby, Baby Driver, Scott Pilgrim vs. The World, Men, Women & Children, Shaun of the Dead and Looper, among others. He has composed music for the National Film Board of Canada, Cartoon Network, Sesame Street and Adult Swim. He has also been commissioned to create music for runway shows for Belgian fashion designer Dries Van Noten.

Kid Koala's live shows range from touring turntable carnivals like Vinyl Vaudeville, to immersive multimedia shows like Nufonia Must Fall, the Storyville Mosquito, Satellite Turntable Orchestra and his Space Cadet Headphone Concert; each of which express his unique form of storytelling with music, animation, film and interactive entertainment.

Kid Koala has toured six continents and lives with his wife and two daughters in Montreal, Canada.

== Early life and education ==
San was born in Vancouver to parents from Hong Kong. His grandparents were from Guangdong. He grew up speaking English and Cantonese, listening to jazz and studying classical piano. As a teenager, his tastes drifted to rock music and hip hop.

San attended Sir Winston Churchill Secondary School in Vancouver, British Columbia, Canada, but graduated from Thomas Sprigg Wootton High School, in Rockville, Maryland, U.S., and went on to study elementary education at McGill University, in Montreal, Quebec.

== Career ==
San began by distributing copies of his demo tape Scratchcratchratchatch to students living in residence at McGill. He is well known for his enigmatic style of turntablism, which uses an unusual collection of samples. He has used samples of music from Charlie Brown television specials, old comedy sketch routines (including those that mock turntablism), people sneezing, and people reading a menu in Cantonese.

In 2000, San released his album, Carpal Tunnel Syndrome. He designed and illustrated the cover for this and his later albums. A comic book he drew is included as the liner notes. Following the release of the album, Kid Koala embarked on an extensive tour, during which he opened for a number of musicians, including Radiohead and Björk. The cabaret-style tour throughout North America, Europe and Australia, known as The Short Attention Span Theatre, featured an unpredictable opening act—three DJs (Kid Koala, P-Love, and DJ Jester the Filipino Fist) on eight turntables set up like a band, and a bingo game at intermission among other quirky surprises. Following this tour Kid Koala has performed DJ sets in Asia, as well as in Iceland, Eastern Europe, Russia, and South America whilst working on a new book and a multimedia puppet show.

San released a full-length graphic novel, Nufonia Must Fall, which includes a soundtrack CD he composed. Some of my Best Friends are DJs includes a chess set as part of the packaging.

San popularized a method of playing the turntable like a melodic instrument, where a long, single note is dragged under the needle at different speeds, creating different pitches. Since this method of adjusting pitch is imprecise, the resulting notes waver and bend. Thus, in the song "Drunk Trumpet," San uses this method with a trumpet note to simulate a drunken trumpet player, interspersing drunken vocals to complete the effect. When playing live, San often uses records cut with custom sounds from which he creates his own songs.

During the 2010 San Diego Comic-Con, Kid Koala performed before a special free showing of the movie Scott Pilgrim vs. the World. The next year at Comic-Con, he performed before a special premiere of the television series NTSF:SD:SUV::.

In June 2013, his studio album 12 Bit Blues was longlisted for the 2013 Polaris Music Prize.

In June 2014, the Kid Koala's Nufonia Must Fall Live made its world premiere at Toronto's Luminato Festival. Directed by K. K. Barrett, (Oscar-nominee for Her), this live adaptation of the graphic novel unfolds via a real-time filming of more than a dozen miniature stages, a full crew and cast of puppets. San and the Afiara Quartet provide live scoring on piano, strings and turntables. San also has another project debuting at Luminato Festival entitled The Lost Train, a collaboration between San and Joe Beef's Chef Frédéric Morin. The two joined to create a series of "imaginary journeys with real food and music", inspired by their respective passion for trains. Taking place at a secret location, the experience will remain a mystery with the guests being taken to an undisclosed location, and will feature a specially created course by Morin and a live set of entirely new material by Kid Koala.

In early 2017, San released an album, Music to Draw To: Satellite, in collaboration with Icelandic singer Emilíana Torrini. He released a follow-up in early 2019, Music to Draw To: Io, in collaboration with Belgian singer Trixie Whitley.

In 2023, he entered production on the animated film Space Cadet, his directorial debut as a filmmaker. The film had its world premiere at the 75th Berlin International Film Festival, 2025. Also in 2023, San released his seventh album as Kid Koala, Creatures of the Late Afternoon, which included a complete board game in a limited edition.

== Discography ==
=== Solo projects ===
==== Albums ====
- 2000: Carpal Tunnel Syndrome
- 2003: Some of My Best Friends Are DJs
- 2006: Your Mom's Favorite DJ
- 2012: 12 Bit Blues
- 2017: Music to Draw To: Satellite
- 2019: Music to Draw To: Io
- 2023: Creatures of the Late Afternoon

==== EPs and singles ====
- 1996: Scratchappyland (selections from Scratchcratchratchatch)
- 2000: Emperor's Main Course in Cantonese
- 2003: Basin Street Blues
- 2012: "2 bit Blues", "6 bit Blues"
- 2017: "Collapser" (featuring Emilíana Torrini)
- 2018: "All for You" (featuring Trixie Whitley)
- 2018: "Allotropic"

==== DVDs ====
- 2005: Live from the Short Attention Span Audio Theater Tour!! - 5 track live EP with accompanying DVD containing the video of the live performance plus 4 music videos

==== Books ====
- 2003: Nufonia Must Fall - graphic novel with accompanying 17 minute audio CD (ECW Press)
- 2011: Space Cadet - graphic novel with accompanying soundtrack CD (Uni Books)

==== Other ====
- 1996: Scratchcratchratchatch - mixtape demo album, limited to 500 copies and initially released on cassette only.
- 2010: Solid Steel: Music to Draw To... (Mixtape)
- 2018: Floor Kids (Original Video Game Soundtrack)

==== Remixes ====
- 1997: Coldcut - "More Beats and Pieces (Obsessive Behaviour Version)"
- 1998: DJ Vadim - "Vad Forgive Me (Bullfrog Kid Koala Mix)"
- 2001: Kalyanji-Anandji - "Third World Lover" (Kid Koala and Dynamite D remix)
- 2002: Fog - "Check Fraud (Kid Koala's Space Cadet E002 Mix)"
- 2002: Dan the Automator - "Untitled" (featuring Damon Albarn and Mos Def) (Kid Koala Remix)
- 2003: Amon Tobin - "Untitled" with Kid Koala
- 2004: Lederhosen Lucil - "Semi-Sweet"
- 2004: Noveltones - "The Gonk"
- 2005: The Free Design - "An Elegy" (Kid Koala and Dynamite D remix)
- 2005: Yusef Lateef - "Bamboo Flute Blues (Kid Koala Remix)"
- 2007: Pierre Lapointe - "25-1-14-14"
- 2008: Jack Johnson - "Angel"
- 2009: Bell Orchestre - "Icicles / Bicycles (Kid Koala Remix)"
- 2011: Amon Tobin - "Ruthless (Kid Koala Remix)"
- 2013: Emeli Sandé and the Bryan Ferry Orchestra - "Crazy in Love (Kid Koala Version)"
- 2013: Trixie Whitley - "Irene (Kid Koala Remix)"

==== Appearances ====
- 2001: Gorillaz - Gorillaz (Parlophone)
- 2004: Handsome Boy Modeling School - White People (Elektra)
- 2006: Peeping Tom - Peeping Tom (Ipecac)
- 2007: Josh Haden - Devoted (Diamond Soul)
- 2014: MC Frontalot - Question Bedtime (Level Up)

=== Group projects ===
- 1998: Bullfrog - Bullfrog Theme (independent)
- 1998: Ninja Tune - Ninja Cuts: Funkungfusion (Ninja Tune)
- 2000: Bullfrog - EP1 (Independent)
- 2000: Bullfrog - EP2 (Independent)
- 2000: Deltron 3030 - Deltron 3030 (75 Ark)
- 2000: Deltron 3030 - "Virus" (75 Ark)
- 2001: Deltron 3030 - Deltron 3030: The Instrumentals (75 Ark)
- 2001: Deltron 3030 - "Positive Contact" (75 Ark)
- 2001: Lovage - Music to Make Love to Your Old Lady By (75 Ark)
- 2001: Lovage - Music to Make Love to Your Old Lady By: The Instrumentals (75 Ark)
- 2001: Bullfrog - s/t (Ropeadope)
- 2004: Bullfrog / Robertson - Deeper Shade of Green (independent)
- 2007: Martin Tétreault & Kid Koala - s/t (Phon-O-Victo)
- 2009: The Slew - 100% (Puget Sounds)
- 2013: Deltron 3030 - Event 2 (Bulk)

=== Video games ===
- 2013: BattleBlock Theater (The Behemoth)
- 2017: Floor Kids (Hololabs Studio Inc.)
- 2021: Riders Republic (Ubisoft)
- 2025: South of Midnight (Microsoft)

== Film ==
=== Composer ===
- 2005: Strum (short) – original music
- 2005: A Girl's Guide to Modern Dating (short) – original music
- 2006: Jaime Lo, Small and Shy (short) – original music
- 2017: 3 Amigonauts (TV series) – theme music composer

=== Contributor ===
- 2010: Scott Pilgrim vs. the World (feature) – contributor to the original score
- 2013: The Great Gatsby
- 2017: Baby Driver – contributor to the original score

=== Director ===
- 2025: Space Cadet animated film, it will premiere at the Berlinale in February 2025.

== See also ==
- List of Quebec musicians
- Music of Quebec
