= Up, Bustle and Out =

- Origin: England
- Genres: Trip hop, electronic, jazz, nu jazz, hip hop, funk, acid jazz, Cuban music, jazz hip hop
- Years active: 1994–present
- Label: Ninja Tune
- Members: Rupert Mould; Senor Cuffy; Dave Cridge; Eugenia Ledesma

Up, Bustle and Out are musicians and recording artists - Rupert Mould (also known as Señor Rudi) from Bristol, Senor Cuffy (Spanish Guitarist), Dave Cridge (Beat Keeper and tour/soundsystem dj) Eugenia Ledesma (percussion and Vocals) UK. They have released a number of albums and singles on the Ninja Tune independent record label.

Their music combines electronic music, jazz, hip-hop and funk, but with a distinctly international flavour, particularly South American and Cuban influences. The two Master Sessions albums were co-written by Cuban flautist and orchestrator, Richard Egües.

== Discography ==
- The Breeze Was Mellow (As The Guns Cooled In The Cellar) (April 1994, Ninja Tune, Cat: ZENCD13)
- One Colour Just Reflects Another (May 1996, Ninja Tune, Cat: ZENCD19)
- Light 'em Up, Blow 'em Out (May 1997, Ninja Tune, Cat: ZENCD27)
- Rebel Radio Master Sessions Vol.1 (Jun 2000, Ninja Tune, Cat: ZENCD46)
- Master Sessions Vol 2 (July 2001, Ninja Tune, Cat: ZENCD58)
- Urban Evacuation (10 February 2003, Unique Records, Cat: UNIQ0692)
- City Breakers (7 October 2004, Routes Music, Cat: RTS01) (double vinyl only)
- The Mexican Sessions (June 2006)
- City Breakers - 18 Frames Per Second (Due for release 30 January 2006, Collision Records)
- Istanbul's Secrets, with Sevval Sam (February 2008, Collision Records, Cat: CCT3017-2) - double CD, vocal and dub versions
- Soliloquy, (April 2010, Collision Records, Cat: CCT3020-2)

There is also a limited-edition version of Rebel Radio Master Sessions Vol.1 (Cat: ZENCD46BK) that includes a book entitled "The Rebel Radio Diary".
