= Ninja Tune =

English record label

- Parent company: BMG Rights Management (2026–present)
- Founded: 1990; 36 years ago
- Founder: Matt Black; Jonathan More
- Distributors: [PIAS]; Redeye Distribution; Universal Music Group (2026–present)
- Genre: Electronic; downtempo; dance; hip-hop; experimental
- Country of origin: England
- Location: London
- Official website: ninjatune.net

Ninja Tune is an independent record label based in London, with a satellite office in Los Angeles. It was founded in 1990 by musicians Matt Black and Jonathan More, known collectively as Coldcut. The label was established as an outlet for Coldcut to explore a style distinct from that of the mainstream music industry. In March 2026, the label and its publishing arm were acquired by Concord, which in turn would be acquired by BMG Rights Management in September of the same year.

== History ==
=== 1990–1999 ===
Following a Coldcut tour in Japan with Norman Cook (a.k.a. Fatboy Slim, then of Beats International) the label lifted its moniker and aesthetic from the Japanese TV shows of the 1950s and 1960s based on the Ninja. With their first releases in the early 1990s, Ninja Tune went on to "usher in trip-hop/instrumental hip-hop" according to Pitchfork.

After Coldcut's success with their first label, Ahead of Our Time, contractual issues prevented them from releasing anything under their name. Ninja Tune's inaugural release was Coldcut's (under the name Bogus Order) house break collection Zen Brakes Vol. 1 in 1990. The label's profile increased when Coldcut, as DJ Food, released their funky hip-hop jazz-breaks album, Jazz Brakes Vol. 1, which "blew up" in the DJ circuit, according to Record Collector. DJ Food's Jazz Brakes series were intended as source material for DJs and producers who worked with breaks and beats.

In 1992, Peter Quicke joined as label manager, as did Patrick Carpenter, a.k.a. PC, who joined Coldcut as a sound engineer. Steinski, a big inspiration behind Coldcut's initial forays into music, released his first Ninja Tune EP as Steinski and Mass Media in the same year. According to Nate Patrin, the single "builds on a catchy loop of the Jackson 5's 'It's Great to Be Here' and creates one of the few anti-Gulf War protest songs of the era, transforming [U.S. President George H. W.] Bush's speech into a pop hook ('Regrettably, we now believe/ That only force will make him leave') and interspersing quotes from Jello Biafra ('don't hate the media, become the media!') and Mario Savio's famous 1964 address to the Berkeley Free Speech Movement."

Between 1994 and 1997, Ninja explored the instrumental hip-hop beats sound (often known as trip hop). Its pioneering influence on the genre became more prevalent with the label's first compilation, Funkjazztical Tricknology, in 1995. The genre originated in England as a successor to acid house, taking influence from acid jazz and funk, and using hip-hop style breakbeats rather than the mechanical four-on-the-floor drum rhythm of house.

The ongoing success of the Solid Steel radio show, and its subsequent syndication across the globe, broadcast the Ninja brand across the airwaves. The late-night Saturday show cut all manner of beats, samples, and loops into a chaotic musical blend. The show's 'everything but the kitchen sink' approach continued through Coldcut's "utterly brilliant" Journeys by DJ series of mix compilations in 1995. The title 70 Minutes of Madness was a nod to Coldcut's earlier Eric B & Rakim remix, and included sounds from Depth Charge, DJ Food, Plastikman, Mantronix, Harold Budd and the Doctor Who theme.

In 1994, Matt Black's close friend Mixmaster Morris introduced Matt to Openmind – a DJ & design collective in Camberwell – at the Telepathic Fish chill-out club they were running. Openmind included Kevin Foakes a.k.a. Strictly Kev of DJ Food. After submitting a re-styled company logo he was employed by Ninja Tune in the capacity of overall design consultant. Matt Black also invited Foakes to Ninja's recording studio, where he eventually joined the many hands at work on DJ Food's 1995 album, Recipe for Disaster (which also included Patrick Carpenter a.k.a. PC, Isaac Elliston, Paul Rabiger and Paul Brooks).

With their two 1994 albums, Paradise Blown and Electric Lazyland, 9 Lazy 9 helped spawn the funky, subterranean sound for which Ninja Tune would earn its early acclaim, combining hip-hop and funk breakbeats with jazz-influenced sound.

Coldcut's "Timber" video – an AV collage piece using analogous techniques to audio sample collage – was put on heavy rotation on MTV, and won awards for its innovative use of repetitive video clips synced to the music, including being shortlisted at the Edinburgh Television and Film Festival in their top five music videos of the year in 1998.

In 1995, Matt Black created Pipe, Ninja's first website. The label's current website, ninja tune.net, was developed by the following year.

Also in 1996, Ninja Tune expanded across the ocean, opening its Montreal office to manage distribution across North America.he book Integrated Performance Management described Ninja Tunes as devising "a term that perfectly expresses the antitheses between chaos and order."

n 1997 Ninja Tune's sister label Big Dada was launched. Coldcut's fourth album Let Us Play! was released in September 1997, making its way to the Top 40, reaching No. 33 in the UK Charts. Let Us Play! paid homage to the greats that inspired them. Their first album to be released on Ninja Tune, it featured guest appearances by Grandmaster Flash, Steinski, Jello Biafra, Jimpster, The Herbaliser, Talvin Singh, Daniel Pemberton and Selena Saliva. Hex collaborated with Coldcut to produce the multimedia CD-ROM for the album. Hex later evolved the software into the engine that was used on the Let Us Play! world tour.

In 1999, Let Us Replay! was released, a double-disc remix album where Coldcut's classic tunes were remixed by Cornelius (the opener of the album, which was heralded as a highlight of the album), Irresistible Force, Shut Up and Dance, Carl Craig and J Swinscoe. Spin Magazine stated that Let Us Replay! pieces together "short sharp shocks that put the mental in 'experimental' and still bring the breaks till the breakadawn." It also includes a few live tracks from the duo's innovative world tour. The CD-ROM of the album, which also contained a free demo disc of the VJamm software, was one of the earliest audiovisual CD- Roms on the market, and Muzik claimed deserved to "have them canonized...it's like buying an entire mini studio for under $15."

Mr. Scruff's Keep It Unreal was released in the summer of 1999. Filled with bubbly breakbeats, slick horn sizzles, and bristling house beats, the album opened with BBC Radio 1 DJ Mary Ann Hobbes asking, "Are you ready Mr. Scruff?"

At some point in 1999, the U.S. Federal Communications Commission decided that DJ Vadim and Sarah Jones' pro-women empowerment record Your Revolution was "indecent" for radio. The decision ended up in court in 2002, where arguments were advanced for freedom of speech, freedom of expression and to argue the double standards of the ban and fine.

=== 2000–2010 ===
In 2000, Ninja Tune celebrated its first decade of music with Xen Cuts, a three-CD, six-LP boxed set that provided a collection of its artists. Mark Richardson with Pitchfork called the effort a "mostly downtempo affair." It featured the likes of Latyrx (Lyrics Born and Lateef), The Herbaliser, Kid Koala, Luke Vibert, Clifford Gilberto, Amon Tobin, and Funki Porcini.

Also in 2000, Kid Koala released Carpal Tunnel Syndrome, "a playfully arranged montage of quirky sound bites, rhythmic scratching, and fluid hip hop beats." Deriving sample material from both comedy albums and sound effects records, and jazz and funk vinyl, the release received much critical success. It was called "brilliant" and "humorous" in the book Minority Report: An Alternative History of English-language Arts in Quebec. Kid Koala cut two further highly acclaimed albums for Ninja, 2003's Some of My Best Friends Are DJs and 2006's Your Mom's Favorite DJ.

In 2001, Roots Manuva delivered his second album, Run Come Save Me, which was deemed one of the albums of the year by The Independent. Similarly, Mojo described it as "not just a landmark UK hip hop album, but a landmark hip hop album period". The album charted at number 33 in the UK Charts. "Witness (1 Hope)", the first single off the album, charted at No. 45 and was declared by AllMusic as being "the best British rap single since Tricky's 'Aftermath'." Run Come Save Me won a nomination for the 2002 Mercury Music Award, and was called by The Times "Too maverick, too brilliantly original a talent to be tethered by mere genre or geography."

Also in 2001 Cornwall's Luke Vibert joined Ninja Tune. Growing up amongst contemporaries Aphex Twin and Tom Middleton/Global Communication, Vibert had made a name for himself in experimental electronica, though his name has always been hard to pin down: he operates under several different aliases. With the moniker Wagon Christ, Vibert released Musipal on Ninja, which NME called "an intriguing procession of cheeky collages."

Mr. Scruff's second album on Ninja Tune, Trouser Jazz, was released on 9 September 2002. It charted at 29 on the UK Chart.

In 2003, Simon Green, a.k.a. Bonobo, released his first proper Ninja album, Dial 'M' for Monkey, a subliminally seductive collection of atmospheric instrumentals. A live version of Bonobo soon took to the road, which seeped into the production of 2006's Days to Come, an album that blurs the line between a programmed and live sound and created "a daydream vibe embedded within its moodiness."

Blurring lines further, Coldcut collaborated with American video mashup artist TV Sheriff in 2004 to produce their cut-up entitled Revolution USA. The tactical-media project (coordinated with Canadian art duo NomIg) followed on from the UK version and extended the premise "into an open access participatory project," according to author Graham Meikle. Through the multimedia political art project, over 12 gigabytes of footage from the last 40 years of US politics were made accessible to download, allowing participants to create a cut-up over a Coldcut beat. Coldcut also collaborated with TV Sheriff and NomIg to produce two audiovisual pieces "World of Evil" (2004) and "Revolution '08" (2008), both composed of footage from the United States presidential elections of respective years. The music used was composed by Coldcut, with "Revolution '08" featuring a remix by The Qemists.

Roots Manuva climbed back into the limelight at the beginning of 2005, with his deft album Awfully Deep. His third album, which reached number 24 in the UK Charts, was celebrated by critics for his growth as an artist, with NME calling it "a set of immense maturity that never rubs your nose in its thematic complexity, compositional innovation, and thunderous thump-beats."

The Cinematic Orchestra scored a new soundtrack, Man with a Movie Camera, for a screening of the visionary 1929 Russian silent feature, Man with a Movie Camera, for the 2000 Portuguese Film Festival Fantasporto. The following year it was performed at the opening gala of Portugal's year as European Capital of Culture in Porto in front of 3000 people. The material written for this film score laid the groundwork for what would be The Cinematic Orchestra's second full-length, Every Day, released in May 2002, and one of Ninja's best-selling albums. Roots Manuva featured on the track "All Things to All Men", which later soundtracked the final scenes of the 2006 movie Kidulthood. The Cinematic Orchestra's albums grew increasingly ambitious over the years, with 2007's Ma Fleur album marking a move away from beats, and embracing folk influences. The album was based on the work of photographer Maya Hayuk (who commissioned 11 pictures based on three short stories recounting the journey from birth to death), and conceived by Swinscoe as the premise for the score of an imaginary film. Album track "To Build a Home" became one of Ninja's top tracks of all time (with its fan video clocking up nearly 9 million plays), and track "TBAH" features vocals from Patrick Watson, which became the band's most successful song.

Following Jason Swinscoe's vocal appreciation of Jaga Jazzist's 2001 album A Livingroom Hush, the Norwegian jazz band signed to Ninja Tune to re-release A Livingroom Hush in 2002, followed by The Stix later that year, and their fourth album What We Must in 2005.

Coldcut returned with the single "Everything Is Under Control" at the end of 2005, featuring Jon Spencer (of Jon Spencer Blues Explosion) and Mike Ladd. It was followed in 2006 by their fifth studio album Sound Mirrors, which was quoted as being "one of the most vital and imaginative records Jon More and Matt Black have ever made", and saw the duo "continue, impressively, to find new ways to present political statements through a gamut of pristine electronics and breakbeats." The fascinating array of guest vocalists included Soweto Kinch, Annette Peacock, Amiri Baraka, and Saul Williams.

Ninja connected with L.A. filmmaker and photographer B+, who had filmed Keepintime: Talking Drums Whispering Vinyl, a short movie documenting a meeting between jazz/funk drummers Paul Humphrey and James Gadson, and a bunch of turntablists who now scratched and sampled their breakbeats, including DJ Shadow, Cut Chemist and the Beat Junkies. This project snowballed into a live concert featuring the drum duo jamming along with the turntablists – and included extra guests Madlib and DJ Numark. In 2005, Ninja released Keep in Time: A Live Recording, a CD/DVD package that included remixes from King Britt, Oh No, J Rocc, and AmmonContact.

Back in London, having previously scored a place with his college band E.V.A. on the 1996 Ninja 12" One Track Mind, Fin Greenall subsequently signed to the label as a solo artist, under the name Fink. First releasing Fresh Produce – an atmospheric set of downtempo instrumental hip-hop tracks – on sister label Ntone in 2000, it was 2006's Biscuits for Breakfast album that set Fink officially on Ninja Tune. Two subsequent full-lengths – 2007's Distance and Time and 2009's Sort of Revolution (which featured song-writing collaborations with John Legend) have seen Fink further develop this new sound.

On the topic of sound, noise manipulator Amon Tobin came back around at the beginning of 2007 with Foley Room, his sixth studio album, and a long player that was called his "darkest work yet." Tobin was inspired by the work of Foley artists: a Foley room is where the sound effects are recorded for films; Foley artists use their imagination and ingenuity to make the right noise for the situation they are presented with. Amon and a team of assistants headed out into the streets with high-sensitivity microphones and recorded found sounds from tigers roaring to cats eating rats, from wasps to falling chickpeas, kitchen utensils to motorbikes to water dripping from a tap. Added to this were the sounds of The Kronos Quartet, Stefan Schneider (of To Rococo Rot), and Sarah Pagé, Tobin traveling from Foley rooms in Montreal to San Francisco to Seattle and back as he collected them (the CD release is accompanied by a short DVD, Foley Room: Found Footage, documenting the recording process).

Kevin Martin began developing his sound further as The Bug, after other projects such as GOD, Techno Animal, Ice, and Curse of the Golden Vampire. The Bug's second album in 2003, Pressure, demonstrated a fully formed aesthetic – stark spaces, gleefully subsonic bass – holding collaborations with vocalists such as Toastie Taylor, Wayne Lonesome and Daddy Freddy. 2008's London Zoo, meanwhile, was The Bug's third album – and first for Ninja Tune. Recorded over three years with its maker living in his studio, without a kitchen or shower, the album included collaborations with Warrior Queen, Tippa Irie, Burial, Kode9 collaborator Spaceape, and even singer-toaster Ricky Ranking showing up on three tracks. Erik Martiny said it is a "multivocal, spoken-sung, collaborative album." It appeared in many outlets' "best of 2008" lists.

The year 2008 launched Ninja Tune's You Don't Know, their sixth official label sampler, and, like its predecessors, contained high-quality picks from their major releases, with select remixes and a few rarities. While 2007's Well Deep multimedia package shed light on Big Dada, Ninja Cuts drew a healthy cross-section from all three Ninja-associated labels.

2008 also marked Daedelus' first official Ninja album, Love to Make Music To, after their previous albums Exquisite Corpse and Denies the Day's Demise had been licensed by Ninja Tune. The album showcased the L.A. artist's diverse nature and their skills as a multi-instrumentalist as well as their engrossing stylistic shifts. Additionally that year (a year after their 2007 Stompbox 12"), The Qemists released their debut album, Join the Q. AllMusic said that the group had constructed "some of the most energetic breakbeats of the late 2000s".

In 2008, an international group of party organizers, activists, and artists – including Coldcut – received a grant from the Intelligent Energy Department of the European Union, to create a project that promoted intelligent energy and environmental awareness to the youth of Europe. The result was Energy Union, a piece of VJ cinema, a political campaign, a music tour, a party, an art exhibition, and social media hub. Energy Union toured 12 EU countries throughout 2009 and 2010, completing 24 events in total. Coldcut created the Energy Union show for the tour, a one-hour Audio/Visual montage on the theme of Intelligent Energy. In presenting new ideas for climate, environmental, and energy communication strategies, the Energy Union tour was well received, and reached a widespread audience in cities across the UK, Germany, Belgium, The Netherlands, Croatia, Slovenia, Austria, Hungary, Bulgaria, Spain, and the Czech Republic.missing reference

Speech Debelle's debut album, 2009's Speech Therapy, finally scored Big Dada a Mercury Prize, after prior nominations for Roots Manuva's Run Come Save Me and Ty's Upwards. With the album, NME called her: "one to seriously watch."

=== 2010–present ===
A book entitled Ninja Tune: 20 Years of Beats and Pieces was released on 12 August 2010, and an exhibition was held at Black Dog Publishing's Black Dog Space in London showcasing artwork, design, and photography from the label's 20-year history. A "stunning futurespective" compilation album was released on 20 September in two formats – a regular version consisting of two 2-disc volumes, and a limited edition (of 3,500 copies), containing six CDs, six 7" vinyl singles, a hardback copy of the book, a poster, and additional items. It featured new music from Amon Tobin (also as Two Fingers), Roots Manuva, The Cinematic Orchestra, Kid Koala, Mr. Scruff, The Bug, King Geedorah, Zomby, Bonobo, Toddla T, Daedelus, Dorian Concept, Floating Points, Wagon Christ, cLOUDDEAD and many others. It also included new remixes from Switch, Autechre, Benga, Cut Chemist, Modeselektor, Roots Manuva, Diplo, Gold Panda, Mark Pritchard, Rustie, Prefuse 73, 808 State, Joe Goddard, King Jammy, The Orb, Micachu, Gaslamp Killer, Kronos Quartet, Mala, El-P (and El-B) and many more. In The Independent's "Album of the Week" review, the compilation was deemed "a glorious celebration of Ninja Tune's audio splendor."

As part of the 20th anniversary, Ninja Tune produced 20 different events around the world. Ninja Tune sold out Royal Albert Hall in London, with The Cinematic Orchestra, Amon Tobin, and Dorian Concept all presenting a one-off orchestral performance with the London Metropolitan Orchestra arranged by composer Ilan Eshkeri. For a separate London event, Ninja also placed a legendary rave in 3 rooms in a car park behind the Tate Modern with all of their artists in one place for the first time (artists included Coldcut, Mr. Scruff, Roots Manuva, Toddla T, The Bug, Daedelus, Kid Koala, Bonobo, Dj Food + DK, Mark Pritchard, DJ Kentaro, Dorian Concept, XXXchange (Spank Rock), DELS, Floating Points, Jammer, Dark Sky, and Offshore). For the Ninja XX gig in New York, the label's venue (Santos Party House) was shut down unexpectedly, moving the event at the last minute to the Bowery.

In October 2011, Ninja Tune's massive "Ninja Tune XX" campaign won "Innovative Marketing Campaign of the Year" at the 2011 AIM Awards.

It was around this time that Ninja Tune began expanding its roster in an interesting new direction, co-signing underground labels with whom they felt artistically aligned. In February 2010, LA-based producer Flying Lotus, a.k.a. Steven Ellison, announced his Brainfeeder imprint had partnered with Ninja Tune to handle manufacturing, marketing, and distribution for Brainfeeder everywhere outside the US. In April 2010, Sheffield-born producer and DJ Toddla T (who had originally arrived at Ninja having produced parts of Roots Manuva's 2008 album, Slime & Reason, which reached number 22 in the UK Charts) also signed his Girls Music record label to Ninja Tune for distribution, manufacturing, and marketing, in addition to signing a three-album deal. In June 2012, Ninja announced a partnership with underground artist Actress and his Werkdiscs imprint, home to Zomby's Where Were U in 92?, Actress's Hazyville, and various records by Lukid and Lone.

Also in 2010, Bonobo's own Black Sands album marked his fourth full-length. It pushed Bonobo's sound "much more steeped in beat-making, creating deluxe, post-dance soundscapes", and achieved worldwide commercial success. In February 2012, Ninja followed up with a remix album, Black Sands Remixed, which featured re-imaginings from producers such as Lapalux, Mark Pritchard, Machinedrum and FaltyDL.

A couple of months before, in November 2011, New York producer FaltyDL had made his debut on the Ninja roster with his Atlantis EP, a "smoother and shuffler" ride than most of his earlier work. His work for Ninja was deemed "calm and focused, a trend that continued on his third album", Hardcourage, released in January 2012. Ruth Saxelby with Pitchfork said the album was "sure-footed and big-hearted, accessible and yet cerebral."

Jaga Jazzist returned in 2010 with their strongest release to date, One-Armed Bandit, which featured new members within Jaga Jazzist's ranks and included "tropical polyrhythms, modernist patterns, and even techno-inspired synth sequences."

Another release that pushed Ninja to new sonic territories came from London-based artist Floating Points at the end of 2010 with 'Post Suite / Almost in Profile'. The Floating Points Ensemble is an instrumental ensemble headed by himself on Fender Rhodes and Sequential Circuits Pro One and Prophet keyboards. The double A-side 10" vinyl single featured two tracks by the full Ensemble, recorded and mixed at Abbey Road Studios for the Ninja Tune XX twentieth anniversary celebration.

In 2010, a sound designer from Berlin (by way of Bristol), Emika, brought a new sound to the label, with her melodic, R&B tinged bass-heavy 'Double Edge.' Her self-titled debut was later released in 2011, Billboard said that Emika came close to "bridging the minimalist menace" of Bristol dubstep to " breathy accessible vocals and classical piano." On her 2013 follow-up, 'DVA,' Emika shifted her song writing style, focusing on political and personal themes.

In March 2011, another exploratory bass cadet – Dorian Concept – released his first Ninja EP, Her Tears Taste Like Pears. It proved to be a "solid example of the kind of genius Concept, himself something of a child piano prodigy, is capable of."

The following May saw the release of a much-awaited album from Amon Tobin, ISAM, which set a new benchmark for live electronic music. Tobin decided to step away from previous DJ centric performances, and instead provided a large-scale live audio/visual experience to select cities around the world. Developed alongside V Squared Labs, Leviathan, Vello Virkhaus & Matt Daly, Alex Lazarus, Vitamotus Design Studio, and Stefano Novelli, the show featured a 25' x 14' x 8' multi-dimensional/ shape shifting 3D art installation surrounding Tobin and enveloping him and the audience in a 3D experience. Tobin conceptualized the show as a projection-mapped "visual score" to the music from ISAM. The show completed a sold-out 15-show run through US and Canada, in addition to five sold-out UK/EU shows. In 2012, ISAM Live returned with a larger tour, starting at Coachella and traveling to Sydney Opera House, London's Brixton Academy, New York's Hammerstein Ballroom, Greek Theatre (Los Angeles), Sonar (Barcelona), as well as full European and US tours throughout summer and fall. In May 2012, Ninja Tune released an Amon Tobin box set (7 × CD, 2 × DVD, 6 × Vinyl, 10").

At the beginning of 2012, Speech Debelle returned to Big Dada, after much critical speculation about leaving the label. She returned from her Mercury Prize win to release another critically acclaimed album, 'Freedom of Speech.' According to Scottish magazine The Skinny, this album had "a verve and vigor that more than justify the early hype." The "refreshingly outspoken" album went on to "trounce all expectations" and was awarded CD of the week by Evening Standard.

In 2009, Ninja's longest-serving artist, DJ Food a.k.a. Strictly Kev, released the 2009 EP 'One Man's Weird Is Another Man's World,' and its 2010 follow-up 'The Shape of Things That Hum' made up two-thirds of a forthcoming album. In January 2012, 'The Search Engine' was released as the first DJ Food album in 11 years. As an album release event, DJ Food created his most ambitious live gig to date: a bespoke AV live show for London's only public planetarium, in conjunction with astronomers from The Royal Observatory Greenwich, using art from The Search Engine, images from Kev's visual archive, plus a wealth of material provided by the astronomers themselves. Kev adapted his content to fit Montreal's Stratosphere in July.

In mid-2012, The Bug announced that after "London Zoo," he set out a new genre and sub-label with Ninja Tune: Acid Ragga. Releasing a set of 7"s, in June the first Bug track – "Can't Take This No More" – unleashed featuring the legendary Daddy Freddy, while on the flip "Rise" featured Inga Copeland of Hype Williams. The "Ganja Baby" 7-inch was released shortly afterward, featuring Daddy Freddy, followed by the 2 x 10" Filthy EP featuring rapper Danny Brown and long-time collaborator Flowdan.

In August 2012, London-based band The Invisible dropped their second album, the "cerebral yet instantly accessible" 'Rispah,' on Ninja Tune, having been recorded in Brighton – with producer Richard File. The trio's self-titled debut album (produced by Matthew Herbert) in 2009 was nominated for the Mercury Prize and selected as critics choice for iTunes album of the year. The band's tongue-in-cheek definition of their style of music is 'Experimental Genre-Spanning Spacepop'.

In 2012, Ninja Tune also struck a deal with the game developer United Front Games and their publisher Square Enix for their game Sleeping Dogs. Ninja Tune was featured as an in-game radio channel available to the player during gameplay, one of the ten total. The station featured a select group of works by the real-life Ninja Tune record and their then-artist lineup, including works by Bonobo, Lorn, Emika, Stateless, Two Fingers, and Cinematic Orchestra among others, for a total of 18 tracks.

Ninja Tune scored well at Gilles Peterson's Worldwide Awards 2013, with Brainfeeder winning "Label of the Year" – and Ninja Tune scoring 2nd – with the public vote. Invisible's Rispah also won Album of the Year.

In typical pioneering fashion, in February 2013, Ninja Tune spearheaded the launch of Beat Delete – a new service for out-of-press vinyl. The demise of Sony DADC warehouse in Edmonton (destroyed during the London riots in the summer of 2011), left many independent labels ravaged. Ninja Tune launched a website Beat Delete as a pledge scheme enabling fans to partially fund the release of rare collectibles.

In April 2013, Coldcut released Ninja Jamm, an iOS music remix app, in collaboration with London-based arts and technology firm Seeper. Geared toward both casual listeners and more experienced DJs and music producers, the freemium app allows users to download and remix "Tunepacks" that feature original tracks and mixes by Coldcut, as well as other Ninja artists, creating something new altogether. With what Billboard called the "intuitive yet deep" remixer, users can turn instruments on and off, swap between clips, add glitches and effects, trigger and pitch-bend stabs and one-off samples, and change the tempo of the track instantly. Users can additionally record as they mix and instantly upload to SoundCloud or save the mixes locally. Tunepack releases for Ninja Jamm are increasingly synchronized with Ninja Tune releases on conventional formats. To date over 20 tune packs have been released, including Amon Tobin, Bonobo, Coldcut, DJ Food, Martyn, Emika, Machinedrum, Raffertie, Irresistible Force, Falty DL.

In March 2013, Bonobo unleashed his highly anticipated follow-up to Black Sands, the triumphant and revelatory The North Borders. Hailed as being sumptuous and accomplished, the album featured Erykah Badu, Motion Audio artist Grey Reverend, British singer Szjerdene and Swedish singer-songwriter Cornelia. Visual artist Cyriak's video for Bonobo's "Cirrus" was a cascading visual mantra that hit over 1 million views. The album charted at number 29 on the UK Album Charts. The following November, Bonobo released his contribution to the Late Night Tales series with a 21-track selection, which Bonobo described as ranging "from neo-classical to more abstract electronic pieces to spiritual jazz." Bonobo's popularity in the live spectrum continues to grow, having sold out a Roundhouse Ninja Tune festival in 2013 and Sydney Opera House. He has a live performance scheduled at Alexandra Palace in November 2014.

Another popular Ninja Tune artist, Travis Stewart, a.k.a. NYC/Berlin artist Machinedrum signed up with the label in 2013, first releasing Eyesdontlie that July, a single which XLR8R donned "quite possibly deeper and more ambitious than anything we've heard from Stewart to date." After releasing a second 12" ("Gunshotta Ave") the following month, Machinedrum released his full LP Vapor City at the end of September 2013. With Pitchfork calling the album "visceral," it is n album about an imaginary metropolis, Vapor City received much acclaim from critics and DJs alike, even landing three live performances on the Boiler Room (New York, Berlin, and London). Machinedrum claimed it was his biggest and boldest project to date.

In January 2014, Big Dada released a deluxe European edition of Killer Mike and El-P's Run the Jewels album, featuring new artwork, a new colour vinyl LP + 12" release plus deluxe CD and download editions.

Ninja Tune also released Actress' fourth album, Ghettoville in January 2014. The exquisite

In April 2014, new Ninja Tune signing Kelis released a raw soul record entirely produced by TV on the Radio's Dave Sitek. Kelis says of the signing: "I'm really happy to be partnering with Ninja Tune on my new record. This is the album I've wanted to make for a long time."

In May 2014, "UK festival favorite" Mr. Scruff released his fifth LP on Ninja Tune, entitled Friendly Bacteria. Meanwhile, The Bug is continuing his series of "Acid Ragga" singles throughout 2014, leading up to his next full-length later in the year, Angels & Devils. Names that The Bug has worked with on the project (in addition to Inga Copeland and Daddy Freddy) include Death Grips, Gonjasufi, Grouper, JK Flesh (Godflesh/Jesu), The Spaceape, Flowdan, Warrior Queen and Earth's Dylan Carlson.

On 2 November 2014, Young Fathers' "Dead" entered the official Top 100 UK album chart for the first time, four days after their Mercury success, debuting at 35.

On 30 October 2015, Big Dada's Roots Manuva released his 9th studio album entitled Bleeds, receiving positive reviews in most publications, currently holding an 80% score on Metacritic.

Kamasi Washington's album The Epic was released in May 2015 via Flying Lotus' Brainfeeder to critical acclaim. It appeared on numerous 'Best of 2015' lists, including publications such as NPR Music, The Guardian, Pitchfork, Vice's Noisey, MOJO, Uncut, Rolling Stone and many more.

Bonobo released his sixth album, Migration, in January 2017. It was announced on 3 November 2016 with the release of the single "Kerala" and an official video. The official video for the single is directed by Bison (Jon Hopkins/London Grammar/Rosie Lowe), featuring lead Gemma Arterton (Quantum of Solace/Inside No. 9). The album artwork was designed by Neil Krug (Boards of Canada/Lana Del Rey). The album features Nick Murphy, Rhye, Innov Gnawa and Hundred Waters. The album and the track "Bambro Koyo Ganda" were nominated for the 60th Annual Grammy Awards for Best Dance Recording and Best Dance/Electronic Album. The album peaked higher in the UK chart (number 5) and in the US (number 59). In 2018, Bonobo's "Migration" album also won Album of the Year at the 2017 Electronic Music Awards and Bonobo was also nominated for Live Act of the Year. Around the release of the album, Bonobo performed sold-out shows at venues such as Brixton Academy and Alexandra Palace.

On 19 May 2017, Ninja Tune Founders Coldcut and Adrian Sherwood released their collaborative debut album Outside The Echo Chamber via Ninja imprint Ahead of Our Time. Collaborators that featured on the album included Lee "Scratch" Perry, Roots Manuva, Junior Reid, Ce'Cile, Sugar Hill Gang alumni Skip McDonald and Doug Wimbish on Guitar and Bass respectively and production from Toddla T.

In 2017 Ahead of Our Time released the album Stories From Far Away on Piano by James Heather, and also released its follow-up in 2022, the album Invisible Forces.

After signing to Ninja Tune in 2017, Belfast-based duo Bicep released their long-awaited debut album Bicep, which reached the Top 20 of the UK Album Charts and received positive reviews on its release, with support from publications such as Pitchfork, The Guardian, Resident Advisor and a cover feature on Mixmag. They went on to play a sold-out show at London's Roundhouse.

A Moment Apart, Odesza's third studio album was released on 8 September 2017 on Ninja Tune imprint Counter Records. It reached #3 on the Billboard 200 while topping the Top Electronic/Dance Albums Chart. It was nominated for Best Dance/Electronic Album, with "Line of Sight" also nominated for Best Dance Recording, at the 60th Annual Grammy Awards in 2018. The duo was also nominated for Producer of the Year at the 2017 Electronic Music Awards.

Young Fathers' third studio album, Cocoa Sugar, was announced with the single "In My View" on 17 January 2018. The album was released to critical acclaim on 9 March 2018. The album entered the UK Albums Chart at number 28, making it the band's highest-charting album. Due to their support of Palestinians through the BDS movement, the band was dropped from the 2018 Ruhrtriennale line-up.

Berlin based South Korean Dj and Producer Peggy Gou released her EP Once in March 2018, with lead single "It Makes You Forget (Itgehane)", on which she sings in Korean, receiving widespread radio play on stations like BBC Radio 1, BBC 6 Music and more. This earned Peggy a place on the publication Dazed's top 100 artists of the year.

Following the release of the 'Audio Track 5' EP and live performances at the Strelka Institute (Moscow), Barbican Centre and the Tate Modern, electronic producer and musician Darren Cunningham AKA Actress and the London Contemporary Orchestra released a full album of their collaboration on 25 May 2018 entitled 'LAGEOS'. Originally performed at the Barbican in February 2016, the project was curated by Boiler Room and London Contemporary Orchestra with support from Arts Council England and Ninja Tune.

In December 2017, Ninja artist Helena Hauff became the first ever female DJ to be named BBC Radio 1's Essential Mix of the year. She was also rated number 1 in Crack Magazine's "50 Most Exciting DJs Right Now" 2017. On 3 August 2018 the Hamburg-based Techno producer and DJ released her album "Qualm." The album currently holds an 82% rating on Metacritic indicating "Universal acclaim", with five-star write-ups in publications such as The Guardian.

The subsidiary label Technicolour released Yu Su's Watermelon Woman EP in 2019.

== Union recognition ==
In January 2026, Ninja Tune signed a voluntary union recognition agreement with Bectu, the media and entertainment sector of the trade union Prospect, covering all staff roles outside senior management and leadership positions. Bectu described the agreement as a first for a UK record label and said it followed around 18 months of recruitment and negotiations with the company. After recognition, the union began working with Ninja Tune management on issues raised by members both before and after the agreement. Bectu negotiations officer Sam Gipson said staff at the label had approached the union because they wanted "a greater voice in their workplace", and that building membership and discussing issues, "together with a willingness by Ninja management to negotiate, made voluntary recognition possible". The agreement was signed while Ninja Tune was still independent; the label and its publishing arm, Just Isn't Music, were acquired by Concord in March 2026, and Concord was in turn acquired by BMG Rights Management in September 2026.

== Design ==
As the imprint grew, Ninja became an 'anti-corporate' brand, supporting the work of visual artists, filmmakers, and mavericks of all media through running its club nights and helping disseminate the work of its artists across the globe. From its very beginnings, Ninja Tune sought a strong visual identity. This is in part due to Michael Bartalos (whose original logo was a monochrome woodcut of a hooded ninja brandishing his long sword) and Mark Porter, Matt Black's friend from Oxford, Ninja's first art director who defined the logo and overall aesthetic (in addition to creating Ninja's striking yellow and black in-house record bags), and subsequently became Art Director at The Guardian. It was the arrival of Kevin Foakes as an in-house designer in 1994 that developed the logo to its current international recognition and became largely responsible for some of the label's most iconic artwork. Working as Openmind, Foakes has designed many of Ninja's album sleeves, including memorable covers for Amon Tobin, Coldcut, and Funki Porcini's 2002 album Fast Asleep. He's also commissioned acclaimed outside talent for several key projects.

Foakes' Ninja logo has found its way in diverse remix forms onto DJ bags (the "Wax Sack"), cigarette lighters, T-shirts, turntable slip-mats, iPod skins (bearing the slogan "Remember vinyl?"), sunglasses by Japanese company Less Than Human and the label's brand of cigarette rolling papers ("Ninja Skins"). French urban vinyl specialists Rolito also marketed a Foakes-designed toy Ninja, who came armed with a 3" CD of Ninja Tunes.

Ewan Robertson (a.k.a. Offshore) and Oscar Bauer, were integral co-designers for Ninja Tune or Big Dada, responsible for iconic covers such as Wiley's Playtime Is Over, the Roots Manuva slime-head for Slime & Reason and Bonobo's Black Sands triptych.

Some Ninja Tune artists, meanwhile, design their sleeves. One example is Mr. Scruff, whose cartoon illustrations are emblazoned across much of his catalog and merchandise. Another prodigious cartoonist who designs his sleeves is Kid Koala. Kid Koala's Nufonia Must Fall graphic novel, published in 2003 by ECW Press in association with Ninja Tune, 2000 debut album, Carpal Tunnel Syndrome, and its 2003 follow-up Some of My Best Friends Are DJs came accompanied by Koala-illustrated comic books.

Other unique promotional Ninja Tune items include Coldcut's Top Trump-inspired Control Cards, Amon Tobin ear-plugs, Kid Koala-illustrated playing cards, Mr. Scruff-designed jigsaw puzzles, Scruff-branded tins of tuna-in-brine (to promote his 2008 LP Ninja Tuna, which was available pre-loaded on a tuna-shaped USB stick), The Heavy and TTC-branded condoms, and plastic travelcard wallets emblazoned with artwork from Big Dada's Well Deep compilation and Roots Manuva's Slime & Reason album.

As part of Ninja Tune's 20th Anniversary in 2010, 3500 Ninja Tune XX box sets were released, all housed in limited edition hi-spec packaging designed and conceived by Ninja artwork legend Openmind. In May 2013, golden ticket holders for Bonobo's Camden Roundhouse gig in London were given a limited edition 12" for Bonobo's "Cirrus", which came in a gatefold plastic cover with "zoetrope" viewer stand and art print, with picture disc art by Cyriak. In January 2014, Werkdiscs boss Actress released a boxset for a collection of photos presented by Hard Format, which included Ghettoville as vinyl and CD, as well as—for the first time on vinyl—a 2 LP white vinyl edition of Hazyville and CD. The box set also contained a 40-page art book, all carefully encased in a black "elephant-skinned" outer box.

Bonobo has collaborated with art director Leif Podhajsky and photographer Pelle Crépin to create covers for some of his albums. The cover of his 2010 album Black Sands was designed by design studio Oscar & Ewan and features an image taken by Crépin. The three cover photographs form a triptych around Derwentwater in the Lake District. They were taken at each point on the map with each view capturing the place of the next photograph and the last photograph capturing the place of the first. The abstract cover for Bonobo's 2013 follow-up album The North Borders was created by Leif Podhajsky using a polaroid image of a wave. Podhajsky also provides the artwork for Bonobo's Flashlight EP in 2014, its cover art is a gold lava effect forming the inside sleeve glimpsed through tiny holes in a dark grey die-cut cover for the vinyl product. Leif Podhajsky again collaborated with Ninja Tune on the artwork for Kelis' 2014 album Food.

For the release of Bonobo's sixth album Migration in January 2017, the album artwork was designed by Neil Krug. The physical artwork included photography of the Mojave Desert, with Krug capturing footage using a drone. This drone footage would come to form the video for Break Apart feat. Rhye. He drove to the desert in the middle of the night to photograph the area just before sunrise, avoiding the sun's intense heat. The shots were then superimposed with various effects such as flames. The LP was accompanied by a special edition booklet containing meditations on themes from the album, the deluxe version housed in a gold-embossed PVC sleeve.

In 2017, Belfast-based duo Bicep released their debut album Bicep, with artwork created by design team Royal Studio in partnership with AnaTypes Type, Xesta Studio and Lyft Studio. Photographs of textures were digitally transformed, modulated, coloured, gridded, and gridded over and over again in hundreds of different formations. These arrangements of textures in different colourways were then sent to Bicep, who would select their highlights from each.

The artwork for Young Fathers' 2018 album Cocoa Sugar was created by photographer Noni Julia & creative director Tom Hingston.

== Partnerships ==
=== Solid Steel ===
Pre-dating Ninja Tune is the radio show Solid Steel, set up by Coldcut in 1988, and later joined by DJ Food and DK. What initially began as a radio show on then-pirate Kiss FM went on to become a weekly 2-hour mix show broadcast online and syndicated to numerous radio stations around the world, with highlights available as a podcast on iTunes. Solid Steel is also the name of a series of DJ mix CDs from the label and various club nights showcasing the talents of the Solid Steel DJs and several Ninja Tune artists.

The show, which celebrated its 25th anniversary in 2013, showcases a varied blend of left-field tunes, the broadest beats, and forward-thinking selections. Being a freestyle eclectic mix, the weekly two-hour show was described by The Quietus as being "the past mashed with the present plus a dash of the future."

In addition to Solid Steel, Ninja Tune has conducted regularly podcast interviews with their roster under the name The Ninja Tune Podcast.

=== Big Dada ===
Hip-hop label Big Dada was set up by journalist and writer Will Ashon in 1997. Big Dada was created with a similarly open-minded remit to sister label Ninja Tune, traversing the boundaries between hip-hop, grime and ragga. Born out of frustration over acts going unappreciated elsewhere, Big Dada swiftly cemented itself as a force in its own right. The name came up about Ashton's love of Kool Keith, who he had described in print as the "Mac Dada", as a combination of mac daddy and Dadaism.

Big Dada began releasing 12"s in the summer of 1997, the first couple of which were produced by Luke Vibert. The label's debut release, Misanthropic, featured Alpha Prhyme, a.k.a. Juice Aleem, soon to become a member of crew New Flesh for Old, who would release their own Electronic Bombardment on Big Dada that September. Since then, Big Dada has become home to many well-known artists in hip hop and beyond, including essential British hip hop artist Roots Manuva (Mercury Prize nominee), Mercury Prize winner Speech Debelle, UK hip hop artist TY (whose 2003 Upwards album was also Mercury nominated). Roots Manuva's album releases have been integral to the label, including Brand New Second Hand, Run Come Save Me, Awfully Deep, Slime & Reason and 4everevolution. Other notable artists include Diplo, cLOUDDEAD, Juice Aleem, DELS, Young Fathers (Mercury Prize Winner 2014), and Spank Rock, with a roster that's as prolific as it is varied. In the words of The Guardian, "Heaven help the music hack who tries to pigeonhole Big Dada's output."

In 2021, the label was relaunched as "a label run by Black, POC & Minority Ethnic people for Black, POC & Minority Ethnic artists."

=== Brainfeeder ===
Brainfeeder is an independent record label based in Los Angeles, California, founded by Warp Records recording artist Flying Lotus in 2008, focusing on electronic music and instrumental hip-hop, among other styles of music.

=== Werkdiscs ===
Werkdiscs (formerly spelled as Werk Discs) is a British independent record label based in London. Originally a club night started by Darren J. Cunningham a.k.a. Actress, Ben Casey and Gavin Weale in the early 2000s,[11] Werkdiscs released their first record in the summer of 2004.

=== Ntone ===
Ntone, Ninja Tune's first sister label, debuted in 1994, specializing in avant-garde music and more electronically inclined ambiance. Animals on Wheels, Cabbageboy, Hexstatic and Neotropic were among the artists on the bill. According to Peter Quicke, Ntone was "for ambient and techno and other stuff that did not quite fit Ninja Tune, but that we liked and did not want to limit ourselves from releasing." The earliest release, AntiStatic (TONE 1) by Hex in February 1994, and the final, Sunflower Girl (NTONE 45) by Neotropic in 2001, were a collision of spacey dub and mellow ambient house.

== Artists ==
=== Ninja Tune: current ===
- Actress (Werkdiscs / Ninja Tune)
- Amon Tobin
- Anz
- Agung Gede
- Ammoncontact
- Andreya Triana
- Ash Koosha
- A Winged Victory for the Sullen
- Barry Can't Swim
- Ben Böhmer
- Bicep
- Black Country, New Road
- Blockhead
- Bonobo
- Bronson
- The Bug
- The Cinematic Orchestra
- Coldcut
- Congo Natty
- corto.alto
- Dedekind Cut
- DJ Food
- Dorian Concept
- FaltyDL
- Fink
- Floating Points
- Forest Swords
- Fcukers
- Georgia Anne Muldrow
- Glass Beams
- The Heavy
- Helena Hauff
- Hiatus Kaiyote
- Iglooghost
- India Jordan
- The Invisible
- Jaga Jazzist
- Jameszoo
- Jayda G
- Jordan Rakei
- Julianna Barwick
- Lee Bannon
- Kadhja Bonet
- Kae Tempest
- Kamasi Washington
- Keleketla!
- Kelis
- King Geedorah
- King Midas Sound
- Lapalux
- Leon Vynehall
- Letherette
- Little Dragon
- Lorn
- Lou Rhodes
- Louis Cole
- Lukid
- Machinedrum
- Maribou State
- Marie Davidson
- Martyn
- Metronomy
- Modeselektor
- Mr. Scruff
- Nabihah Iqbal
- Nathan Fake
- Octo Octa
- ODESZA
- Onyx Collective
- Peggy Gou
- Phantoms
- Portico
- Róisín Murphy
- Roots Manuva
- Ross From Friends
- salute
- Sampa the Great
- Sarathy Korwar
- Speech Debelle
- Taylor McFerrin
- Teebs
- Thundercat
- Tycho
- Yeule
- Young Fathers

=== Ninja Tune: alumni ===
- 9 Lazy 9
- Animals on Wheels
- Antibalas
- Cabbageboy
- Daedelus
- The Death Set
- DJ Kentaro
- DJ Vadim
- Dwight Trible
- Emika
- Eskmo
- Funki Porcini
- Grasscut
- The Herbaliser
- Hexstatic
- Hint
- Jesse Boykins III & MeLo-X
- Kelis
- Kid Koala
- The Long Lost
- Portico
- Raffertie
- Neotropic
- Park Hye Jin
- Pest
- Poirier
- The Qemists
- Quannum
- Saul Williams
- Sixtoo
- Skalpel
- The Slew
- Stateless
- Super Numeri
- Submotion Orchestra
- Toddla T
- Up, Bustle and Out
- Wagon Christ
- Yppah
- Zero dB

=== Big Dada: current ===
- Busdriver
- Congo Natty
- Dels
- Kae Tempest
- Roots Manuva
- Young Fathers

=== Big Dada: alumni ===
- Antipop Consortium
- Cadence Weapon
- Clouddead
- Diplo
- Dobie
- Juice Aleem
- K-the-I???
- King Geedorah
- Bigg Jus
- Spank Rock
- Speech Debelle
- Thavius Beck
- Thunderheist
- TTC
- Ty

=== Ntone ===
- 2 Player
- Animals on Wheels
- Cabbageboy (Si Begg)
- Drome (Bernd Friedmann)
- Fink
- Flanger
- Hex
- Hexstatic
- Journeyman
- Juryman
- Neotropic (Riz Maslen)
- Omnium (Snap Ant)
- Purr (Funki Porcini)
- Real Life
- Rhys Chatham
- Transcend

== See also ==
- Lists of record labels
- List of electronic music record labels
- List of independent UK record labels
