= Plus+ =

Defunct social gaming network

Plus+ was a social networking, game discovery and multiplayer platform launched by Ngmoco in June 2009. It was similar to Xbox Network, allowing users to interact with other players while playing. The Plus+ Network had approximately 14 million registered users in October 2010.

On March 31, 2013, Plus+ servers were shut down along with the games that were supported.

== Games ==
The following is a list of games that have been published by Ngmoco and therefore support Plus+:

- Charadium (2010) - A Pictionary style game.
- Dr. Awesome (2008)
- Dropship (2009)
- Eliminate Pro (2009) - A free online-multiplayer first-person shooter (FPS) Quake-style death match game by Ngmoco. Also includes various add-ons which give free power cells.
- Eliminate CO-OP (2010) - A free extension to Eliminate Pro which enables to play co-operative 2-player matches against AI Robots in any Eliminate Pro version.
- GodFinger (2010)
- MazeFinger (2008)
- Rolando (2008) - A game similar to LocoRoco for the PlayStation Portable which involves using the iPhone's accelerometer to move "Rolandos" around to beat missions.
- Rolando 2: Quest for the Golden Orchid (2009) - The second installation in the Rolando series.
- Star Defense (2009) - A three-dimensional tower defense game by Ngmoco.
- Topple (2008)
- Topple 2 (2009)
- Touch Pets: Dogs (2009)
- We Rule (2010) - A FarmVille style game by newtoy and Ngmoco that involves you building a kingdom.
- We Farm, We City - sequels to We Rule
- Word-Fu (2009)
- Word-Fu Plus (2009)
- Word-Fu Plus French (2009)
- Word-Fu Plus Japanese (2009)

== See also ==
- Mobage
- List of social gaming networks
