= Mr. Scruff =

English record producer and DJ (born 1972)

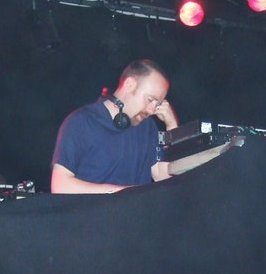
- Scruff performing live DJ set at the Savoy, Cork, Ireland, on 30 May 2008.

Background information
- Born: Andrew Carthy; 10 February 1972 (age 54); Macclesfield, Cheshire, England
- Origin: Greater Manchester, England
- Genres: Electronic; trip hop; house; nu jazz; downtempo; electro swing
- Occupations: Record producer; disc jockey
- Instruments: Digital audio workstation (DAW); sampler; turntables
- Years active: 1992–present
- Labels: Ninja Tune; Pleasure Music
- Website: www.MrScruff.com

Andrew Carthy (born 10 February 1972), known professionally as Mr. Scruff, is an English record producer and DJ. He lives in Stretford, Greater Manchester and studied fine art at the Psalter Lane campus of Sheffield Hallam University. Before he could make a living from his music alone, he worked as a shelf stocker in the Hazel Grove branch of Kwik Save.

His stage name was inspired by his scruffy facial hair as well as his trademark loose-lined drawing style. He has been DJing since 1992, at first in and around Manchester, then nationwide. He is known for DJing in marathon sets (often exceeding six hours), his eclectic musical taste, his love of a "nice cup of tea," and the quirky home-produced visuals and animations associated with his music. In an interview, he said, "It's about putting a lot of effort in and paying attention to detail. I get annoyed if I don't take risks. I'm very hard on myself."

== Career ==
In his twenties, Mr. Scruff's first 12" vinyl, "Hocus Pocus," was released on the small Manchester-based label Rob's Records. Subsequent singles and his first album (Mr. Scruff) followed, released on Rob's Records subsidiary Pleasure Music. After a brief spell working with Mark Rae, he moved to the larger Ninja Tune label and subsequently released the albums Keep It Unreal and Trouser Jazz.

His most notable hit, "Get a Move On!", is built around "Bird's Lament (In Memory of Charlie Parker)" by Moondog and has been used in several commercials, ranging from Lincoln and Volvo automobiles to France Télécom and GEICO insurance. The song also samples Shifty Henry's "Hyping Woman Blues" and led to a renewal of interest in Henry's compositions.

In 2004, Mr. Scruff released Keep It Solid Steel Volume 1, the first of what is intended to be a series of several DJ mixed compilation CDs for Ninja Tune's Solid Steel series of artist mixes. These mixes are designed to recreate the eclectic genres one would expect to hear at a Mr. Scruff club night. In November 2006, Ninja Tune confirmed that the eighth Solid Steel record would be mixed by J Rocc and the ninth would be Volume 2 from Mr. Scruff. Other Solid Steel mixes have been released by fellow Ninja Tune artists including The Herbaliser, Hexstatic, DJ Food, and Amon Tobin.

He has a wide array of remixes to his name and has also produced tracks for others – notably "Echo of Quiet and Green" for sometimes-collaborator Niko on her 2004 album Life on Earth. Niko returned the favour by appearing on the track "Come Alive" from the Trouser Jazz album.

Having performed regularly at The Big Chill Festival in Eastnor Castle deer park, Ledbury, Herefordshire, Mr. Scruff was asked in 2006 to select the tracks for the compilation album, Big Chill Classics.

July 2008 saw the release of Southport Weekender Volume 7, a double album released in the Southport Weekender series, recorded in a purpose-built holiday village in Southport, Merseyside. The first disc was mixed by German nu jazz DJs Jazzanova, and the second was mixed by Mr. Scruff, whose contribution is a mix of soul music.

In 2008, a new independent record label, Ninja Tuna, was founded, a collaboration between Mr. Scruff and the Ninja Tune label. Mr. Scruff's most recent singles and the album Ninja Tuna were all released on the new label.

A US-only release of the album on MP3 came with 10 additional tracks from the Ninja Tuna recording sessions, under the title Bonus Bait. A CD version of this supplementary album was released in the UK in February 2009.

On 19 May 2014, Ninja Tuna released Mr. Scruff's fifth studio album, Friendly Bacteria.

== Style ==
=== Artwork ===
Mr. Scruff's album and single cover art, music videos, merchandise and his official website are noted for their whimsical cartoonish look; the cartoons are drawn by Mr. Scruff himself in what he calls "potato style." The images and animations are also projected onto large screens during his gigs. Scruff also drew cartoons for music magazines such as Jockey Slut in the 1990s.

=== Tea ===
Mr. Scruff began selling tea from a small room at the Manchester club, the Music Box (where he was resident DJ around 2000), with the proceeds going to charity. When he started touring, Mr. Scruff took the enterprise with him and gained a reputation for being the DJ with the teashop. When appearing at festivals, such as Big Chill and WOMAD, tea stalls or tents were erected and were open for the duration of the festivals. Mr. Scruff subsequently started an online tea company, Make Us a Brew, and produced his own range of fair trade teabags which used to be sold in department store chains Selfridges, Waitrose and Booths. His official website still sells branded tea-related paraphernalia including teapots, mugs and tea towels, but the tea is no longer sold as the Make Us a Brew company was dissolved in September 2013.

He was the joint owner (with his manager Gary McClarnan) of Teacup Kitchen, located in Thomas Street, Manchester, though this closed in March 2020 with the first COVID-19 lockdown and never reopened.

=== Fish ===
Most of Mr. Scruff's studio albums contain tracks about fish, whales and other sea-life, which cut up recordings of voiceovers from children's stories and nature documentaries to create surreal and silly stories. They began with the track "Sea Mammal" (featuring a sample from Boogie Down Productions' track "Part Time Sucker"), released on the single "Hocus Pocus" (1995). It is also the opening track on Scruff's first album. This was followed by "Wail" (as a homophone for "Whale"), also on his first album. Keep It Unreal (1999) featured the tracks "Shanty Town" and "Fish," the latter of which features samples from the likes of David Attenborough and David Bellamy. The album Trouser Jazz (2002) closes with another cut-up track, "Ahoy There!", noted as featuring an appearance from "Albert Ross" (albatross).

Mr. Scruff has stated that he is unlikely to record any further fish-based cut-up tracks. However, marine references continue in his work, including the track "Shrimp" from Trouser Jazz and the title and cover art of his albums, especially Ninja Tuna (2008) and its companion release, Bonus Bait (2009).

=== Hot Pot ===
Mr. Scruff and Treva Whateva (his Ninja Tune label-mate and friend from Stockport) recorded a weekly hour-long radio show (with frequent guest, Jon Hill), some episodes of which can still be found on samurai.fm.

== Discography ==
=== Albums ===
==== Studio albums ====
- Mr. Scruff (Pleasure Music, 9 May 1997)
- Keep It Unreal (Ninja Tune, 14 July 1999) UK No. 175
- Trouser Jazz (Ninja Tune, 16 September 2002) UK No. 29
- Mrs. Cruff (Ninja Tune, reissue of Mr. Scruff with additional tracks, 5 May 2005) UK No. 195
- Ninja Tuna (Ninja Tune, 6 October 2008) UK No. 60
- Bonus Bait (Ninja Tune, 9 February 2009)
- Friendly Bacteria (Ninja Tune, 19 May 2014)

==== Mix and compilation albums ====
- Heavyweight Rib Ticklers (Compilation album, Unfold Recordings, 11 February 2002)
- Keep It Solid Steel Volume 1 (DJ mix album, Ninja Tune, 1 January 2004)
- Big Chill Classics (Compilation album, Resist Music, 21 August 2006)
- Southport Weekender Volume 7 (DJ mix album – Disc 2 mixed by Mr. Scruff, Concept Records, 21 July 2008)
- Mr. Scruff Feat. Alice Russell (Music Takes Me Up, 2008)

=== Singles ===
- "Hocus Pocus" (Rob's Records, March 1995)
- "The Frolic EP Part 1" (Pleasure Music / Pinnacle Records, 15 January 1996)
- "The Frolic EP Part 2" (Pleasure Music / Pinnacle Records, 16 February 1996)
- "Limbic Funk" (Pleasure Music, 29 July 1996)
- "Large Pies EP" (Cup of Tea Records, 7 April 1997)
- "How Sweet it Is" / "Is it Worth It?" (with Spikey T) (Grand Central Records, 13 June 1997)
- "Pigeon" (Pinnacle Records, 6 June 1997)
- "Chipmunk / Fish / Happy Band" (Ninja Tune, 10 March 1998)
- "Get a Move On!" (Ninja Tune, 26 April 1999) UK No. 139
- "Honeydew" (Ninja Tune, 22 October 1999) UK No. 129
- "Hocus Pocus" (re-release, Rob's Records, 7 May 2001)
- "Get a Move On! / Ug" (re-release, Ninja Tune, 6 August 2001) UK No. 83
- "Shrimp!" (Ninja Tune, 27 May 2002) UK No. 78
- "Beyond / Champion Nibble" (Ninja Tune, 23 September 2002) UK No. 125
- "Sweetsmoke" (Ninja Tune, December 2002) UK No. 75
- "Sweetsmoke Remixes" (Ninja Tune, April 2003) UK No. 91
- "Giffin" (Ninja Tune, 20 October 2003)
- "Chicken in a Box / Spandex Man" (Ltd edition, Ninja Tune, 11 April 2005)
- "Donkey Ride / Giant Pickle" (with Quantic, Ninja Tuna, 12 May 2008)
- "Kalimba / Give Up To Get" (Ninja Tuna, 14 July 2008) (featured as sample music in Windows 7)
- "Music Takes Me Up" (Ninja Tuna, 15 September 2008)
- "Get on Down / Hold On" (Ninja Tuna, 1 December 2008)
- "Whiplash / Bang The Floor / Cat & Mouse" (Ninja Tuna, 9 February 2009)
- "This Way / Hairy Bumpercress" (Ninja Tuna, 9 March 2009)
- "Nice Up The Function / Listen Up" (Ninja Tuna, 6 April 2009)
- "Bunch of Keys / Cat & Mouse Version 2" (Ninja Tuna, 8 June 2009)
- Mr Scruff Vs Kirsty Almeida – "Pickled Spider" (Ninja Tuna, 14 June 2010)
- "Wobble Control" (Ninja Tuna, 9 May 2011)
- "Feel It / Bounce" (Ninja Tuna, 3 October 2011)
- "Be The Music" (Ninja Tuna, 28 September 2012)
- "Render Me (Remixes)" (with Denis Jones, Ninja Tune, 2 June 2014)
- "Feel Free (Scruff’s 12" Re-Tweak)” (Ninja Tune, 8 August 2014)
- "We Are Coming (Max Graef Remix)” (Ninja Tune, 8 September 2014)
- "Joy of Brass Remixes (Mr. Scruff vs Phil France)” (Gondwana Records, 29 September 2017)
- "Kalimba (Petko Turner Edit)” (Ninja Tune, 10 January 2018)

=== Collaborations ===
Mr. Scruff has collaborated with:

- DJ Spooky – "Murderah Style" appeared on the compilation album Tribal Gathering 96 (Universe, 1 October 1996)
- Mark Rae – "How Sweet It Is" and "Gotta Have Her" both appeared on the compilation album Central Heating (Grand Central Records, 25 November 1996)
- Tony D – "Flavour" featuring Mark Rae, Mark 1 and Mr. Scruff, from the album Pound For Pound (Grand Central Records, 15 September 1997)
- Mark Rae – "The Squirrel" appeared on the compilation album Central Heating 2 (Grand Central Records, 17 April 2000)
- Peter Nice Trio vs. Mr. Scruff – "Harp of Gold" from the compilation album Out Patients (Hospital Records, 30 May 2000)
- Fingathing – "Just Practice" featuring Mr. Scruff, from the album The Main Event (Grand Central Records, 20 November 2000)
- Quantic – "It's Dancing Time" from the compilation album Shapes One (Tru Thoughts, 1 September 2003)
- Quantic – "Giraffe Walk" from Quantic's album, One Off's Remixes and B Sides (Tru Thoughts, 6 February 2006)
- Swell Sessions – "No No" from the album Swell Communications (Freerange Records, 24 September 2007)
- Quantic – "Donkey Ride" (Ninja Tune, 12 May 2008)
- Kaidi Tatham – "Fresh Noodles" (Prime Numbers, 30 November 2009)
- Kirsty Almeida – "Pickled Spider" (Ninja Tune, 30 April 2010)

Several of Mr. Scruff's records also feature guest vocalists and musicians. These include Sneaky (from Fingathing), Roots Manuva, Niko, Braintax, Alice Russell and Danny Breaks. Both Scruff and Roots Manuva have expressed an interest in recording a full album together, though the artists' schedules have prevented this from happening.

=== Covers by other artists ===
- "Get a Move On" was covered by Quantic's Soul Orchestra, on the album Pushin' On (Tru Thoughts, 5 May 2005).

== Song appearances ==
- The last segment from the documentary movie Scratch (2001), entitled "Full Circle," features a different mix of "Spandex Man" with additional samples.
- The opening scene of the Malcolm in the Middle episode "Evacuation" features "Blackpool Roll".
- Episodes of the Channel 4 TV comedy show Spaced featured the tracks "Spandex Man," "Chipmunk" and "Blackpool Roll" from the Keep It Unreal album.
- "Spandex Man" was also used on the BBC series Top Gear, is often used on the BBC Three show The Real Hustle and features in the films SW9 and Gumball Rally 3000.
- The song "Ug" from the album Trouser Jazz is used in numerous Weebl and Bob cartoons, including the very first one entitled "Pie." The pie as a motif later recurred in one of Mr. Scruff's videos ("Sweetsmoke").
- "Get a Move On" has been used in advertisements (including Volvo and Lincoln automobiles), television shows (like the BBC's snooker highlights, Bargain Hunt and The Apprentice), and Kenny Anderson's section of the skateboarding video One Step Beyond. The song was chosen by Victoria Wood as one of her eight favourite records on Desert Island Discs.
- "Blackpool Roll" was used in New Zealand by television network TV ONE (now TVNZ 1) as background music as part of their branded channel advertising and show listings. It also appears in the game Rolando 2.
- "Fish" was used in episode 4 of Diane Morgan's sitcom Mandy. The song is also used by Nexus Studios for the Virgin Atlantic safety video, which features the voices of Vic Reeves and Dani Behr and by Thomson Reuters for their UK Customer Service hold music.
- Several Mr. Scruff tracks appeared on Rolando, a game for Apple's iPhone and iPod Touch devices in 2008. The game, developed by HandCircus and published by Ngmoco, features the tracks "Ug," "Stockport Carnival," "Spandex Man," "Donkey Ride," "Kalimba," "Shrimp," and "Mice at the Organ."
- The track "Kalimba" (from the album Ninja Tuna) is included in the sample music folder on computers running Windows 7.
- "So Long" and "Get a Move On" (from the album Keep it Unreal) have been featured on Cartoon Network's Adult Swim during commercial breaks.
- "Pickled Spider" was featured in the Solid Steel podcast episode "Revenge of The Nerd" as part of a mash-up by DJ Cheeba.
- "Champion Nibble" from Trouser Jazz was used in the video game Forza Horizon 2.
- A poster for "Beyond (feat. Seaming To)" appears on the office wall in the British television comedy The IT Crowd.
