= Rolando (video game) =

2008 video game

- Game logo
- Developer: HandCircus
- Publisher: ngmoco
- Designers: Simon Oliver (game); Mikko Walamies (art)
- Engine: Box2D; Royal Edition; Unity
- Platform: iOS
- Release: December 18, 2008; Royal Edition; April 3, 2019
- Genres: Adventure, puzzle
- Mode: Single-player

Rolando is a puzzle-adventure video game developed by studio HandCircus and published by Ngmoco. It was released for iOS on December 18, 2008, and uses the Box2D game engine.

Rolando's gameplay revolves around navigation of "Rolandos", small ball-like creatures, throughout a fictional world known as "Rolandoland". Rolando received generally positive reviews, with criticism aimed at the games resemblance to LocoRoco. A sequel, Rolando 2: Quest for the Golden Orchid, was released in 2009. A third game was announced and later cancelled.

After being unplayable on newer devices since 2017, Rolando was later re-released in the form of a remake, Rolando: Royal Edition, on April 3, 2019.

A new remake was released under the title Rolando Deluxe on Steam on 17 April 2024.

== Story ==
The goal of the game is to save Rolandoland from an invasion of little shadow creatures. The inhabitants of Rolandoland are the Rolandos, which are little ball-shaped creatures. Rolandos must be directed to safety by tilting the iPhone or iPod Touch and using different bonus items like conveyor belts and elevators.

The Rolandos proceed through a series of worlds before eventually finding and defeating the leader of the shadow creatures.

== Gameplay ==
Rolando gameplay

Each stage has a required number of Rolandos that must escape if the player wants to advance to the next stage. Players can manipulate objects in the world and can tilt an iPhone or iPod Touch to move the Rolandos through the stage. The player rolls the Rolandos either one at a time or in groups, selected by drawing boxes over the intended Rolandos. By swiping one's finger up, the selected Rolandos jump. The player gets help from the Rolando commandos, an elite group of sticky balls who grip surfaces and defy gravity. Contrary to normal Rolandos, these creatures can also stick to the ceiling. This game also features tutorial levels in the first world, which explain the controls and how to play. One may be very familiar with the controls, but it will take a long time to master them.

== Music and art ==
The soundtrack for Rolando is largely from the discography of DJ Mr. Scruff, who lent many of his songs to the game. Such songs include "Spandex Man" (from Keep It Unreal), "Shrimp", "Ug" (from Trouser Jazz), "Donkey Ride", "Kalimba", "Stockport Carnival" (from Ninja Tuna), and "Mice at the Organ" (from the Large Pies EP). Simon Oliver, Rolando's creator, called Mr. Scruff's contribution "icing on the cake" for the game.

Art for the game was created by Finnish illustrator Mikko Walamies. Oliver sent Walamies videos, level layouts, and other development media without ever meeting the illustrator in person. However, Oliver described the relationship positively, saying that their "ideas always seem to be in sync." Walamies made available high-resolution art from Rolando on his website in February 2009.

=== Version history ===
Version 1.1 of the game was released on March 16, 2009 and includes five secret levels with the Honeycup Meadows theme.

Version 1.2 of the game was released on April 21, 2009 and added two more secret levels based on the Fire Canyon theme, and reveals the remaining secret levels as locked icons, bringing the final level count to fifty-six levels. The game was updated weekly with more levels until the release of Rolando 2: Quest for the Golden Orchid.

Rolando Lite was released February 4, 2009 and includes the first eight levels in Honey Cup Meadows, and later, one secret level in the Rolando Lite 1.1 update.

In 2017, Rolando became unavailable on iOS devices using iOS 11 or later due to its 32-bit nature.

An enhanced PC port titled Rolando Deluxe was released onto Windows via Steam platform on 17, April 2024, featuring "fanciest, most polished and snappy version of Rolando" that the developer has "ever released, with redesigned levels, speedrunning challenges, new visual effects, support for mouse & keyboards and joypads and tightened up controls and balancing".

== Reception ==
Reception

Aggregate scores
Aggregator	Score
GameRankings	92%
Metacritic	(Royal Edition) 80/100

Review scores
Publication	Score
Edge	7/10
Eurogamer	8/10
IGN	9.5/10
Pocket Gamer	5/5 (Royal Edition) 3.5/5
TouchArcade	(Royal Edition) 5/5
Slide To Play	4/4

IGN gave the game a 9.5 out of 10 rating. The game was voted as Best iPhone Game of 2008 by the Boston Herald, VentureBeat, and 148Apps and is winner of Pocket Gamer's Platinum Award. Edge Online gave Rolando a 7 out of 10 rating, criticizing the game for using graphics and ideas similar to LocoRoco.

The Royal Edition was nominated for "Best Mobile Game" at the Develop:Star Awards.

== Sequel ==
In February 2009, ngmoco announced two sequels to Rolando. Rolando 2: Quest for the Golden Orchid is similar to its predecessor in that it is a puzzle-based platformer, however, new characters and settings allow new types of movement and some offensive action against the antagonists. The focus of this quest is to cure the two sages of the kingdom of a disease using the mysterious "Golden Orchid".

Also new to Rolando 2 are "Golden Idols" which, when acquired, will allow a player to skip some of the more challenging puzzles. Golden Idols are found throughout the levels of Rolando 2.
