= Rolando 2 =

2009 video game

- Logo for Rolando 2: Quest for the Golden Orchid
- Developer: HandCircus
- Publisher: ngmoco
- Designer: Simon Oliver
- Artist: Mikko Walamies
- Writer: Micah Ian Wright
- Composer: Mr. Scruff
- Platform: iOS
- Release: NA: July 3, 2009
- Genres: Adventure, puzzle
- Modes: Single-player, multiplayer

Rolando 2: Quest for the Golden Orchid is an adventure video game developed by HandCircus, published by Ngmoco, and distributed by Apple Inc. for iPhone and iPod Touch. Rolando 2 was released on July 3, 2009. It is the sequel to Rolando, which was released in 2008. The game follows creatures called "Rolandos" who can be moved around the playing areas by players via the iPhone's accelerometer and the multi-touch features. The game features artwork by Mikko Walamies and music by Mr. Scruff. The game features nonlinear gameplay where players decide how the story plays out.

== Story ==
The story begins with the Sages of the Kingdom of Rolando being infected with a disease, the "Kilgorean Flu". The king orders explorer Sir Richard to lead a team of Rolandos to Stormtop Mountain, to retrieve the Golden Orchid: the only thing that can save the Sages from the curse, and cure them of the flu. Sir Richard has different types of Rolandos to help him succeed in retrieving the Golden Orchid, such as those who can move large objects, dive underwater, and perform other unique navigational skills.

Upon reaching the Isle of Fontanis, the Rolandos split up, but all head in the same general direction across the island. They all meet at Stormtop Mountain, the location of the Golden Orchid. However, the Orchid is guarded by Uqishthatuximon, a gigantic, tree-shaped monster. The Rolandos manage to destroy Uqishthatuximon, and claim the Orchid. They then head back down the mountain, and reach their ship.

The Rolandos sail back to the Kingdom, and Sir Richard enters, being congratulated by the residents on the way to the castle. The Sages are cured, and begin to thank Richard, but another Rolando, Edward, drops in, and announces himself as the new king of the Kingdom. The game ends as the King pleads to their god, "Finger", to save them.

== Gameplay ==
Players tilt the device to guide Rolandos past obstacles to collect crystals and reach the exit within a time limit.

Rolando 2 consists of 46 different levels, which span six chapters. The levels are in a 2.5D environment, although the Rolandos remain in 2D as in the original. The object in each level is to use the accelerometer and multitouch features on the iPhone or iPod Touch to guide the Rolandos to the exit of each level, while avoiding various traps and pitfalls. Players move Rolandos by tilting the device in the direction that the players want the Rolandos to go in. The players must get a set minimum number of Rolandos to the exit. There are multiple paths players can take to lead the Rolandos to the exit. If a Rolando makes contact with one of a certain type of object (e.g., an enemy), it becomes dazed; if a similar object contacts a dazed Rolando, then the Rolando dies. As a new feature which was not in Rolando, players can collect crystals that are scattered throughout the levels. The game rates players at the end of each level, according to the number of Rolandos who reach the exit, the time it takes to get the minimum number of Rolandos to the exit, and the number of crystals collected. Throughout the levels there are other devices designed to help the Rolandos out, such as vehicles that move them around the levels, bombs that destroy obstacles, plants that serve as platforms for them, and turrets that can be used to dispatch enemies, and hit targets.

Rolando 2 contains several new elements that were not in its predecessor. One of them is levels requiring Rolandos to deal with water. Whereas heavier Rolandos sink to the bottom of a water-filled level, smaller Rolandos float on the water's surface. In addition, in some levels, players need to guide the king to the exit by tilting the entire level, a feature similar to that found in the bonus stages of the original Sonic the Hedgehog. In these levels, players also receive the ability to break blocks, using a cannon activated by their finger. Some levels allow Rolandos to inflate balloons to navigate chasms. Other new features include items called "Idols" that allow players to skip levels, medals that can be used to increase users' scores on Plus+ accounts (a system that is similar to that used for Xbox Live), and the ability to post high scores and level completion times on online leaderboards.

== Reception ==
Reception

Aggregate scores
Aggregator	Score
GameRankings	95%
Metacritic	90/100

Review score
Publication	Score
Pocket Gamer	4.5/5

Rolando 2 has received much praise from reviewers for its unique gameplay elements, artwork, sound, and replayability. Levi Buchanan from IGN lauded the game for its artwork, new features, level design, and replayability. He also praised the music, saying that it "sounds like Mr. Scruff was listening to everything from Boards of Canada to Bobby Womack and just synthesized it all for this game". Tracy Erickson from Pocket Gamer praised the game for its new gameplay mechanics, increased accessibility, and the ability to purchase tracks of Mr. Scruff's music from the iTunes Store. Trevor Sheridan from AppDevice.com said that Rolando 2 is "by far the best platformer in the [Apple] App store". Like Buchanan and Erickson, he praised the game's sound, which, according to him, "sets the standard for what other titles should strive for". He praised the replayability, saying that the incorporation of the Plus+ network adds to it. Criticisms of the game were few. Buchanan noted the game's higher-than-normal price, but said that the price is "entirely appropriate for this premium-quality game".

== Possible sequel ==
Rolando 3 was scheduled to be released before the end of 2009, but was delayed and then canceled because the game no longer fit with ngmoco's new policy to only release free games.

At GDC 2014, the developers announced the game Seabeard, which has a different setting, and other protagonists, but has a similar aesthetic and whimsiness.
