= Keep It Solid Steel Volume 1 =

Mr Scruff Presents: Keep It Solid Steel Volume 1

Compilation album by Mr. Scruff
- Released: 1 January 2004
- Recorded: 2003
- Genre: Hip hop, electronica, reggae
- Length: 68:26
- Label: Ninja Tune; ZEN84 (LP); ZENCD84 (CD)

Mr. Scruff chronology
Trouser Jazz (2002)	Mr Scruff Presents: Keep It Solid Steel Volume 1 (2004)	Mrs Cruff (2005)

Solid Steel chronology
Amon Tobin: Recorded Live (2004)	Mr Scruff: Keep It Solid Steel Volume 1 (2004)	DJ Kentaro: On the Wheels of Solid Steel (2005)

Professional ratings
Review scores
Source	Rating
Allmusic	4/5 stars

Keep It Solid Steel Volume 1 is Mr. Scruff's first DJ mix album, recorded for Ninja Tune's Solid Steel series. According to his site, it is the first of 4: "This first CD, of a four-part series, covers in its 74 minutes bouncy reggae, classic hip hop, deep soul, rare funk, dancefloor jazz, heavy beats and left-field electronic nuggets."

== Track listing (CD) ==
1. "Intro" – Mr. Scruff
2. "Ing" – Mungo's Hi Fi
3. "Waterhouse Rock (Groove Corporation mix)" – Big Youth
4. "Black Milk" – Eight From The Egg
5. "Going Way Back" – Just Ice
6. "Time Machine" – Chocolate Milk
7. "Flashback" – The Arsonists
8. "Back in the Day" – Erykah Badu
9. "My Kung Fu" – UTD
10. "Ego Trippin" – Ultramagnetic MCs
11. "Wrong Girls To Play With (dub)" – Papa Austin with The Great Peso
12. "Tell Me How" – Sarah Winton
13. "Recognition" – Demon Boyz
14. "Check the Vibe" – Dred Scott
15. "Funky For You" – Mark Rae vs Deadbeats
16. "Dopest Verse" – Madkap
17. "Disney On Acid" – 2day & 2moro / "Learn To Be Strong (acapella)" – Cappo
18. "Impressions (pt.3)" – The Peddlers
19. "Carrefour" – Luis Enriquez
20. "Funky Axe" – Spaghetti Head
21. "Highland Park" – Connie Price & The Keystones
22. "Sweetie Pie" – Stone Alliance
23. "Bounce Ta This" – Showbiz & AG
24. "Check It" – Lords of the Underground
25. "Deep Waters" – Microdisiacs
26. "Searching For Mr Manuva" – Border Crossing
27. "Pins & Needles" – Tipper
28. "Detchibe" – Prefuse 73
29. "CPU Song" – Little Miss Trinitron
30. "Fairplay" – Soul II Soul
31. "You Have Got To Have Freedom" – Pharoah Sanders

== Track listing (LP) ==
1. "Ing" – Mungos HiFi
2. "Waterhouse Rock" – Big Youth
3. "Black Milk" – Eighth From The Egg
4. "Ego Trippin" – Ultramagnetic MCs
5. "Recognotion" – Demon Boyz
6. "Bounce Ta This" – Showbiz & AG
7. "Deep Waters" – Microdisiacs
8. "Dopest Verse" – Madkap
9. "Disney On Acid" – 2day & 2moro
10. "Sweetie Pie" – Stone Alliance
11. "You Have Got To Have Freedom" – Pharoah Sanders
12. "Impressions (pt.3)" – The Peddlers
13. "Time Machine" – Chocolate Milk
14. "My Kung Fu" – UTD
15. "Carrefour" – Luis Enriquez Bacalov
16. "Funky Axe" – Spaghetti Head
17. "Check the Vibe" – Dred Scott
18. "Tell Me How" – Sarah Winton
19. "Wrong Girls To Play With (dub)" – Papa Austin with The Great Peso
