= The Drowning (video game) =

2013 video game

- Developer: Scattered Entertainment
- Publisher: DeNA/Mobage
- Engine: Unity
- Platform: iOS
- Release: AU: April 11, 2013; WW: August 3, 2013
- Genre: First-person shooter
- Mode: Single-player

The Drowning is a 2013 first-person shooter video game developed by Swedish studio Scattered Entertainment and published by DeNA/Mobage for iOS. Version 1.0 of the game soft launched in the Australasia region on April 11, 2013. A more complete version of the game (Version 1.11) was released internationally on August 3. The game is available under the freemium business model. An Android release was released in 2014. The game's main selling points are its uniquely adapted touchscreen-specific control scheme and "console quality" graphics. Although the graphics were generally praised by critics, the game received mixed to negative reviews, with much criticism aimed at the in-app purchase system and repetitive gameplay.

== Gameplay ==
The game offers two methods of control. The first, and the one upon which the game was primarily marketed, is a system developed specifically for the game and uniquely adapted for touchscreen devices. To shoot, the player taps the screen with two fingers and the player character fires at the middle point between the two taps. To zoom, the player pinches and expands their fingers on the screen. To move, the player taps on the screen where they want to go and the character automatically moves around obstacles until he reaches the designated spot. To strafe, the player swipes left or right on the screen using two fingers. To look around, the player swipes in any direction with one finger, although there is also a shortcut button for instant 180 degree turns. To switch weapons, the player taps on the character's weapon. A more traditional touchscreen first-person shooter setup is also available, with two virtual joysticks, one for moving, one for shooting.

Each level in the game features two types of play mode; attack and defend. Game progression is based upon a crafting system, which also offers upgrades for the character's weapons. As the game advances, certain levels can only be played if the player has crafted the correct item. For example, to craft the car, which is necessary to get to the third section of the game, the player needs a lug nut, which is only found in "The Shore" level. However, "The Shore" can only be played after the player has crafted a weapon capable of zooming. Such a weapon can only be crafted after the player has collected necessary components, which are randomly awarded on various other levels. The items necessary to upgrade and craft new items are randomly awarded to the player at the end of each level, based upon the number of stars they have achieved. Operating on a five star scale, scoring one to three stars results in "common" items, while scoring four or five stars results in a "rare or better" item.

Pictured is the player character fighting an enemy in the game's post-apocalyptic world.

The game uses multiple currencies. Energy (in the form of "Gas cans") is necessary to play the game. Each time the player plays a level, their gas total drops by one. When there is no gas left, the player can no longer play, and can either buy more gas using Gold or must wait until their supply has automatically replenished. "Black" is necessary for crafting new items and upgrading weapons, and is awarded at the end of each level. If the player does not have enough Black to craft an item necessary for advancing the story, they must play previous levels, or purchase Black using Gold. "Flares" can be used at the end of each level to raise the player's score by one star. Flares can be randomly awarded during the game or purchased using Gold. "Silver" is necessary to activate "Charlotte's Bounty", which randomly awards a single prize in the form of an item, a weapon, a gas can, a flare or more silver. Silver is awarded randomly at the end of a level. "Gold" can be used to purchase any of the other currencies, and is only available using real-world money.

== Plot ==
The game is set in 2021. Ten years prior to the opening of the game, 3,000 blackbirds fell out of the sky in Beebe, Arkansas. As scientists proved at a loss to explain how or why the birds had died, similar phenomenon began to occur all over the world. People began to panic, fearing Armageddon was at hand. Several months later the "Black" came. A thick black oil washed in to coastlines, turning anyone who came into contact with it into zombie-like creatures whose goal is to drag the living down into the Black.

The game begins with the unnamed protagonist on a boat, which is subsequently attacked by several oil creatures. He makes it ashore and is about to be overwhelmed by creatures, when he is saved by a woman named Charlotte. Together, they head to a nearby house where they find a note from the presumed-dead owner explaining how to turn the Black into fuel for vehicles. They follow the instructions and get an old car working. Inside the car, they find another note from the man explaining he has left an old boat in a nearby fishing village. They head there, and find another note in the boat. The man speculates that the origin of the Black may be an oil rig off the coast and they should get to his old speedboat on the next island. In the speedboat, another note explains that the Black may be stopped if explosives are dropped down the borehole of the rig. To do so, however, they will need a helicopter, which they can find on the roof of a nearby hospital. They get to the helicopter and head out towards the rig, spotting another helicopter flying away from the island. They tune in to its radio frequency and learn it is on a rescue mission but has reported no signs of life on the islands. As they land on the rig, Charlotte reveals that the old man was her father. They fling the explosives into the borehole, but rather than sealing the spillage of Black, it opens the leak even more, and hundreds of oil creatures begin to scale the rig as an unmoving Charlotte watches them approach her. Later that day, the narrator has returned to the old man's house. He sees a helicopter flying overhead, which drops a package containing a note. The note commends him on his attempt to seal the borehole, and promises to return and evacuate him once it has refueled.

== Development ==
"We believe that the touch system we've created is the future of controlling FPSes on smart devices."

— Ben Cousins

The game was developed by Scattered Entertainment, led by Battlefield producer Ben Cousins. With the aim of appealing to "hardcore players," the developers designed the control scheme specifically for use on touch-sensitive devices. According to Cousins, "We were unsatisfied with the FPSes on mobile devices, and I think from our research, I think a lot of the potential audience who are really interested in the genre have a phone or a tablet, and they're not satisfied with what they've got out there. [We've developed] a control system which is designed for touchscreens that you can play with just one hand, with just two fingers in fact on one hand, and one that really fluidly fits in with the way that we hold these devices and the usage patterns of these devices. So we're really proud that we've created a control system which kind of unlocks the potential of this genre on the platform." In January 2013, Game Informer's Matt Miller said the game was "one of the more ambitious mobile titles we've seen. I'm excited to see if the team can match its impressive visuals and narrative depth with equally enthralling gameplay."

Some of the story elements in the game's prologue were based on a real incident which occurred in Arkansas in 2011, "when thousands of black birds fell from the sky."

== Reception ==
Reception

Aggregate score
Aggregator	Score
Metacritic	55/100

Review scores
Publication	Score
Destructoid	5/10
Eurogamer	4/10
GamesMaster	52%
Gamezebo	4/5
Hyper	6/10
MacLife	2.5/5
Pocket Gamer	2/5
VentureBeat	50/100
VideoGamer.com	5/10
Digital Spy	2/5
National Post	5/10

The Drowning received "mixed" reviews according to the review aggregation website Metacritic.

Gamezebo's Joe Jasko was one of the few critics to give the game a positive review, praising the arena-based nature of the gameplay and the control scheme. Although he was critical of the energy system, writing, "the whole inclusion of this energy system just seems a bit archaic to the game's otherwise pretty fair and generous freemium model," he concluded positively with: "While other mobile FPS games might still be drowning in a sea of shoddy touchscreen controls, The Drowning offers just enough moments of ingenuity and potential insights to these traditional issues that gamers will always be able to keep coming up for refreshing breaths of air."

148Apps' Carter Dotson's criticisms pertained to the integration of the IAP system into the gameplay, saying: "the actual game at the heart of The Drowning is largely a shallow free-to-play machine. The missions, involving both arena-based attack segments and defence missions a la CoD Zombies, are all about two minutes in length. They're friendly for pick-up-and-play gameplay, but are mostly just empty calories. The game is also always concerned with pressuring the player into obtaining more randomly-obtained items for crafting, trying to sell more MobaCoins to spend on gas cans to keep playing, and flares to get rarer items from levels where the maximum reward level is usually incredibly difficult to obtain. It's not really possible to actually enjoy The Drowning for what it is."

Slide to Play's Tyler Feasel criticized the arena-based gameplay, and argued that a standard campaign mode would have been preferable. He was especially critical of the energy system, saying: "To wait 30 minutes to "earn" a few minutes of gameplay is deflating and leaves the experience with a sour taste." He concluded that "The Drowning doesn't feature a solid story or nuanced gameplay, but its solid arcade-shooting mixed with a nice amount of unlocks helps deliver a positive gameplay experience. Unfortunately this fun is crippled by an unbalanced timer system that limits game time in favor of an in-app purchase." MacLife's Chris Pereira said: "While certainly enjoyable at times, The Drowning's free-to-play implementation hampers the game to an inexcusable degree." Chris Carter of Destructoid was critical of the control system, writing, "the overly-simplistic layout does not work." However, his strongest criticisms were in relation to the IAP system, writing, "in the hands of another developer, The Drowning would have been something special. Without the energy mechanic and constant drip-fed weapon and item parts, I could easily see myself destroying an entire afternoon blasting apart zombies." Eurogamer's Dan Whitehead was even more critical. He called the control system "a clumsy and unnatural way to play an FPS." He was also heavily critical of the IAP system's integration into the core gameplay, saying: "This is a game that cannot wait to start asking you to pay, and has at least four interlocked currencies designed to make you feel like you should. To assume that sort of aggressive monetisation isn't a factor in the game's obstructive, uphill design, which ekes out progress to non-paying players painfully slowly, is to be willfully blind to how this sort of thing works." He concluded that The Drowning "is a transaction machine first, a headline-grabbing control scheme second and an actual game a distant third." Pocket Gamer's Peter Willington was equally critical, writing, "First-person shooters today are far more complex than The Drowning ever attempts to be. [...] Playing The Drowning is like travelling back in time to the Quake era - walk about a level and shoot everything until you win." He called the game "a failed experiment," writing: "The game ultimately fails at reinventing first-person shooter controls [...] fails at opening up the first-person shooter to the freemium model [...] fails at being a decent first-person shooter [...] It suffers from a paucity of enemy types, locations that barely change the way you play, minimal peripheral awareness, and some of the most rote shooting available on a touchscreen device."

== Film adaptation ==
On September 23, 2014 Deadline Hollywood reported that Radar Pictures had hired Olympus Has Fallen writers Creighton Rothenberger and Katrin Benedikt to adapt the game into a movie.
