= Kalimba (disambiguation) =

Kalimba are a family of African musical instruments of the lamellophone family.

Kalimba may also refer to:

- Kalimba (video game), a video game for the Xbox One released in 2014 by Danish developer Press Play
- Kalimba Music, an American record label
- "Kalimba Story", 1974 song by Earth, Wind & Fire
- "Kalimba", a song by electronica artist Mr. Scruff on the 2008 album Ninja Tuna

== People ==
Kalimba is a given name. It may refer to:

- Kalimba Edwards (born 1979), American football player
- Kalimba (singer) or Kalimba Marichal (born 1982), Mexican singer
