= Get a Move On! =

Single by Mr. Scruff

from the album Keep It Unreal
- B-side: 1999 single "Do You Hear?" "Ambiosound"; 2001 re-release "Ug" "Ug Beats"
- Released: 1999 single May 1999; 2001 re-release 6 August 2001
- Genre: Electro swing
- Length: 3:25 (Single version) 3:26 (Radio edit) 7:36 (Album version)
- Label: Ninja Tune
- Composer(s): Andrew Carthy

"Get a Move On!" is a song by English record producer and disc jockey Andrew Carthy under his alias Mr. Scruff, featuring Fingathing member: Sneaky, on bass. The song is featured as the third track from his second studio album and major label debut, Keep It Unreal. It was first released as a three-track single in May 1999; then re-released on 6 August 2001 as a three-track single featuring "Ug" as its B-side, which later appears on his next album: Trouser Jazz. The song samples "Bird's Lament" by Moondog, alongside vocals from T-Bone Walker's "Hypin' Woman Blues". It also contains samples of the song "That's the Blues" by Rubberlegs Williams.

== Track listing ==
=== 1999 single ===
Vinyl release

1. "Get a Move On!" – 7:32
2. "Do You Hear?" – 6:54
3. "Ambiosound" – 3:34

CD release

1. "Get a Move On!" (Radio Edit) – 3:26
2. "Do You Hear?" – 6:53
3. "Ambiosound" – 3:34
4. "Get a Move On!" – 7:32

=== 2001 re-release ===
Vinyl release

1. "Get a Move On!"
2. "Ug"
3. "Ug Beats"

CD release

1. "Get a Move On!" (Radio Edit)
2. "Ug"
3. "Get a Move On!"

== Music video ==
A frame from the music video for "Get a Move On!".

The music video for "Get a Move On!" was featured on the CD release of the 2001 single as part of its enhanced CD feature. The music video features frames of Carthy's drawings in sepia tone. Elements of the music video include repeating segments, three-dimensional animation, wavy-like animation, beat synchronization, film-like effects, and unique angles. The video is directed by Carthy and Warren Edmond.

== Charts ==
=== 1999 release ===
Weekly chart performance for 1999 release of "Get a Move On"
Chart (1999)	Peak position
UK Dance (OCC)	18
UK Indie (OCC)	27
UK Singles (OCC)	139

=== 2001 re-release ===
Weekly chart performance for 2001 release of "Get a Move On" / "Ug"
Chart (2001)	Peak position
UK Dance (OCC)	13
UK Indie (OCC)	17
UK Singles (OCC)	83
