= List of social gaming networks =

A social gaming network is an online platform or service that allows people to download games, communicate, or play online with other players. Many networks offer additional features to enhance gameplay, such as achievements or leaderboards.

This is a list of notable social gaming networks and services across desktop, mobile, and console.

== Active ==
Name	Platforms	Launched	Monthly active users
Battle.net	PC	January 1997	
Discord	Web, PC, Mobile	May 13, 2015	150,000,000
EA App	PC, Console	November 11, 2005	
Epic Online Services	PC, Mobile, Console	May 13, 2020	
Game Center	Mobile (iOS)	September 8, 2010	
Google Play Games	Mobile (Android)	July 24, 2013	
GOG.com	PC	February 22, 2008	
GREE	Mobile	December 2004	
Mobage	Mobile	February 2009	
Nintendo Switch Online	Mobile, Console (Nintendo Switch)	September 18, 2018	32,000,000
PlayStation Network	Mobile, Console (PlayStation)	November 11, 2006	110,000,000
Roblox	PC, Mobile, Console	September 1, 2006	
Steam	PC, Mobile, Console (Steam Deck)	September 12, 2003	120,000,000
Twitch	Web, PC, Mobile, Console	June 6, 2011	140,000,000
Ubisoft Connect	PC, Mobile, Console	November 17, 2009	
Xbox network	PC, Mobile, Console, Cloud (Xbox)	November 15, 2002	100,000,000

== Defunct ==
Name	Platforms	Launched	Discontinued
DGamer	Web, Console (Nintendo DS)	May 15, 2008	March 15, 2013
GameClub	Mobile	October 5, 2019	2025
Gameloft Live	Web, Mobile	2008	
GameSpy	PC	1999	February 21, 2013
Heat.net	PC	1997	October 31, 2000
Mplayer.com	PC	1996	2001
Nintendo Network	Console (Wii U/Nintendo 3DS)	January 26, 2012	April 8, 2024
Nintendo Wi-Fi Connection	Console (Wii/Nintendo DS)	November 14, 2005	May 20, 2014
OpenFeint	Mobile	February 19, 2009	December 14, 2012
PlayNET	Commodore 64	1984	1987
PlayOnline	Mobile, Console	June 6, 2000	March 31, 2016
Plus+	Mobile	June 2009	March 31, 2013
Rockstar Games Social Club	PC, Console	April 29, 2008	July 17, 2025
Scoreloop	Mobile	2008	December 1, 2014
Total Entertainment Network	PC	June 1995	October 1999
Wireplay	PC	June 1996	2014
World Opponent Network	PC	1996	November 1, 2008
XBAND	Console (Super NES, Sega Genesis)	November 19, 1994	April 30, 1997
