= GodFinger =

- GodFinger Appstore Icon
- Developer(s): Wonderland Software
- Publisher(s): ngmoco
- Platform(s): iOS
- Release: iPhone, iPod Touch; June 17, 2010; iPad; April 3, 2010
- Genre(s): God game
- Mode(s): Single-player

GodFinger was a god game developed by Wonderland Software and published by ngmoco for iOS. It is no longer available for download on the iPhone, iPod Touch and the iPad on the App Store or iTunes. Although a free app, customers are able to buy in-app purchases.

A trailer was released alongside the launch of GodFinger on June 7, 2010.

GodFinger was removed from the App Store on February 1, 2013. The service for this app ceased, and it became unusable on March 31, 2013.

== Gameplay ==
In GodFinger, players assume the role of God. The player starts off at level 1, in control of their own planet. The aim of the game is to expand this planet, earn money, and buy decorations, earn followers (people) and buildings and gain experience to level up. Players are in control of followers that live on their planet. Players gain more followers as they level up or from building certain buildings. More buildings and shrines become available as the player levels up. Players are also in control of other powers such as terraforming the planet, rain, floods, lightning, sun, and fire. These powers are gained and upgraded as the player levels up. Using these powers also uses up mana. Players start off the game with 10 mana and it recharges over time. As players level up, their maximum mana grows. Players can also earn mana as a reward for planet visiting. The process of mana-making can be made faster by making followers worship at the totem pole/shrine. Players gain experience by completing different goals and by using powers and gaining gold. Gold is gained by making followers farm; eventually, these followers will become exhausted and can be taken to certain buildings to recharge. Players can also gain money by zooming out of their planet and visiting friends' planets. There they can enchant followers which bring in money for the player and the owner of the follower enchanted. Players can purchase awe as a paid download. Awe can be used to speed up farming and building and can also be used to purchase items. The game also includes the Plus+ network.

== Sequel ==
A sequel to GodFinger entitled GodFinger 2 was released on the App Store in 2016 by JiggeryPokery. Before being released worldwide on May 19, 2016, GodFinger 2 was initially soft launched on the Canadian App Store in 2014 by DeNA but was eventually removed. The new title expands the first one drastically. With the addition of civic constructions, crops and storage barns players now have to gather different resources to answer followers' prays in order to gain stars, which are used to level up as opposed to the regular experience (XP) bar. Game mechanics are much more complex and vary from the original GodFinger, making the gameplay more similar to a farm-themed tycoon game like Hay Day. In spite of these changes, core gameplay elements of the first title have remained in the sequel, such as the God powers like: the Rain, the Storm, the Fire and the Terraform (with minor tweaks and the simplified activation of these, the powers no longer need the designated cloud/sun to activate, instead, the player has an interface on the bottom-right to switch between these, the desired power can then simply be activated by holding down anywhere in the sky area and swiping down with the finger); iconic elements like the original followers, the round-shaped planet and the ability to visit other players' planets also make an appearance in the new game and have been left unmodified (with the exception of the planet-visiting mechanic, now simplified and activated through the press of a button on the user interface). The art style has also been radically changed. As of January 2022 God Finger 2 is no longer on the App Store.

== Legacy ==
At first, reviews were mixed and fans were disappointed that the new game differed from the original. On June 17, 2017, in celebration of the 7th anniversary of the first title, JiggeryPokery brought back the classic GodFinger with the update 2.0.1. Players are again able to experience 2010's GodFinger All Stars by building a Time Portal, which unlocks once the player reaches level 10 and unlike any other construction in the game, the Time Portal can be built for free. Once built, the player can dive into the classic iPhone version of GodFinger immediately, and can switch back to the modern game at any time using the "Return2" button on the top-right side of the screen. Awe points are regularly purchasable through in-app purchases.
