= Solid Steel Presents Amon Tobin: Recorded Live =

Live album by Amon Tobin
- Released: June 2004
- Recorded: 2003
- Genre: Electronica
- Length: 63:22
- Labels: Ninja Tune; ZENCD090
- Producer: Amon Tobin

Amon Tobin chronology
Verbal Remixes & Collaborations (2003)	Solid Steel Presents Amon Tobin: Recorded Live (2004)	Chaos Theory - Splinter Cell 3 Soundtrack (2005)

Solid Steel chronology
The Herbaliser: Herbal Blend (2003)	Amon Tobin: Recorded Live (2004)	Mr Scruff: Keep It Solid Steel Volume 1 (2004)

Professional ratings
Review scores
Source	Rating
AllMusic	4/5 stars
Pitchfork Media	7.4/10
Tiny Mix Tapes	5/5 stars
Resident Advisor	4/5 stars

Solid Steel Presents Amon Tobin: Recorded Live is an album by drum and bass artist Amon Tobin mixed live using the Final Scratch software. It was recorded live, as the title suggests, in Melbourne, Australia during 2003 for Ninja Tune's Solid Steel radio series. The European version of the album was first released in June 2004 and then the U.S. version later in September. Track listings vary on the US version.

There exist radio directors cut mixes which includes all the songs which could not be used on the album due to licence problems.

== Track listing ==
1. Intro - Amon Tobin
2. Chronic Tronic - Amon Tobin / Dark Lady - DJ Food
3. Twister - Tipper
4. Verbal - Amon Tobin
5. Remix By AFX - AFX
6. Got Numb - Mob Nation
7. Pressure Cooker - Cherrystones
8. Soul Soul Soul - As One
9. Science Fu (part 1) - Danny Breaks
10. Marine Machines - Amon Tobin
11. Interlude - You's A Jaco Pastorius Looking Motherfucker
12. Schmalla - Facs & Scythe
13. Couger Merkin - Amon Tobin
14. Higher Rates - Silent Witness & Break
15. Cuba (Original) - T Power
16. Moon Palace - Icarus
17. Reactionary - Controller 7
18. Nakatali - Topo Gigio
19. Yasawas - Amon Tobin / Night Life - Amon Tobin / Fear - Amon Tobin
20. Escape - Amon Tobin / Deep Impact - Future Prophecies
21. Spanner in the Worx - Exile
22. Allergic - Deep Roots
23. Completely Real - Suspicious Circumstance
24. Total Recall - Silent Witness & Break
25. Sittin Here - Dizzee Rascal
26. Proper Hoodidge - Amon Tobin
27. Four Ton Mantis - Amon Tobin / Hey Blondie - Amon Tobin
28. Venus in Furs - The Velvet Underground

n
