= Go (Japanese company) =

Japanese taxi company

Coordinates: 35°39′39″N 139°44′26″E

GO Inc.
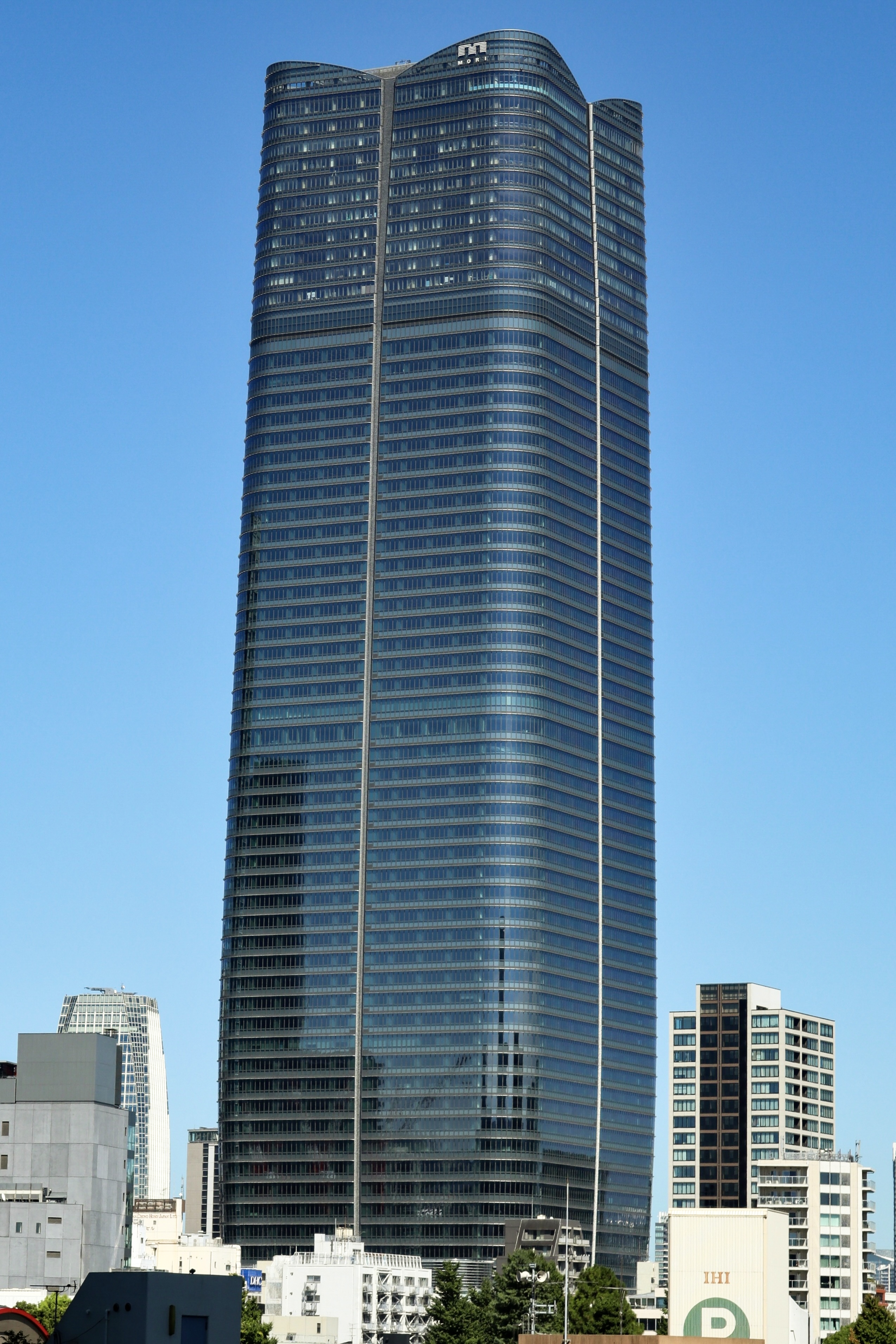
- Azabudai Hills Mori JP Tower, where the company is headquartered
- Formerly: JapanTaxi Co., Ltd. Mobility Technologies Co., Ltd.
- Type: Joint-stock company
- Industry: Vehicle for hire
- Founded: August 1977; 48 years ago in Tokyo, Japan
- Headquarters: 106-0041; Azabudai Hills Mori JP Tower; 23rd floor 1-3-1; Azabudai, Minato, Tokyo, Japan
- Area served: Japan
- Key people: Ichiro Kawanabe, chairman and CEO
- Products: Rideshares; taxis
- Website: goinc.jp

GO株式会社 Inc. (English: GO Inc.) is a Japanese ride-hailing and taxi company headquartered in Minato, Tokyo, that provides the "GO" app and engages in taxi-related business. It also holds licenses for travel and employment agencies. Its largest shareholders are Nihon Kotsu and DeNA. The company was previously known as JapanTaxi Co., Ltd., and Mobility Technologies Co., Ltd., and it rebranded itself on 1 April 2023 to match the name of its flagship app.

== Overview ==
GO Inc. operates within the travel and vehicle-for-hire industry throughout Japan, including taxi services, with a focus on the ride-hailing app "GO". It was established in 1977 as a subsidiary of Nihon Kotsu's computer systems branch (Nihon Kotsu Calculation Center Co., Ltd., and from 1992, Nihon Kotsu Data Services Co., Ltd.)

In 2010, the company began developing and providing taxi dispatch apps such as "National Taxi Dispatch" for operators throughout Japan. As competition in the app market grew, the company changed its name to JapanTaxi Co., Ltd., in 2015, and the app became "JapanTaxi" in 2018.

The current structure was established in 2020, when JapanTaxi merged with DeNA's MOV division, which provided the taxi dispatch app "MOV", and changed its name to Mobility Technologies Co., Ltd. It began developing its own dispatch app based on "MOV" and named it "GO" within the same year.

On 1 April 2023, the company became GO Inc. On 24 November 2023, GO Inc. moved its headquarters to Azabudai Hills Mori JP Tower.

== Brands and projects ==
=== GO ===
Operates a taxi dispatch app and provides business support systems to affiliated taxi operators.

=== GO BUSINESS ===
GO BUSINESS is a taxi management service for corporations.

=== GO CALL ===
GO CALL is a taxi dispatch system for public facilities that operates via proprietary terminals through which users can request a taxi.

=== GO Dine ===
GO Dine is a food delivery service specializing in high-end restaurants.

=== Customer Search Navigation ===
Customer Search Navigation is a demand-forecasting service for taxi drivers belonging to member companies. Operating through an in-vehicle terminal, the service provides navigation directions to areas where future demand for taxis is predicted to be high.

=== DRIVE CHART ===
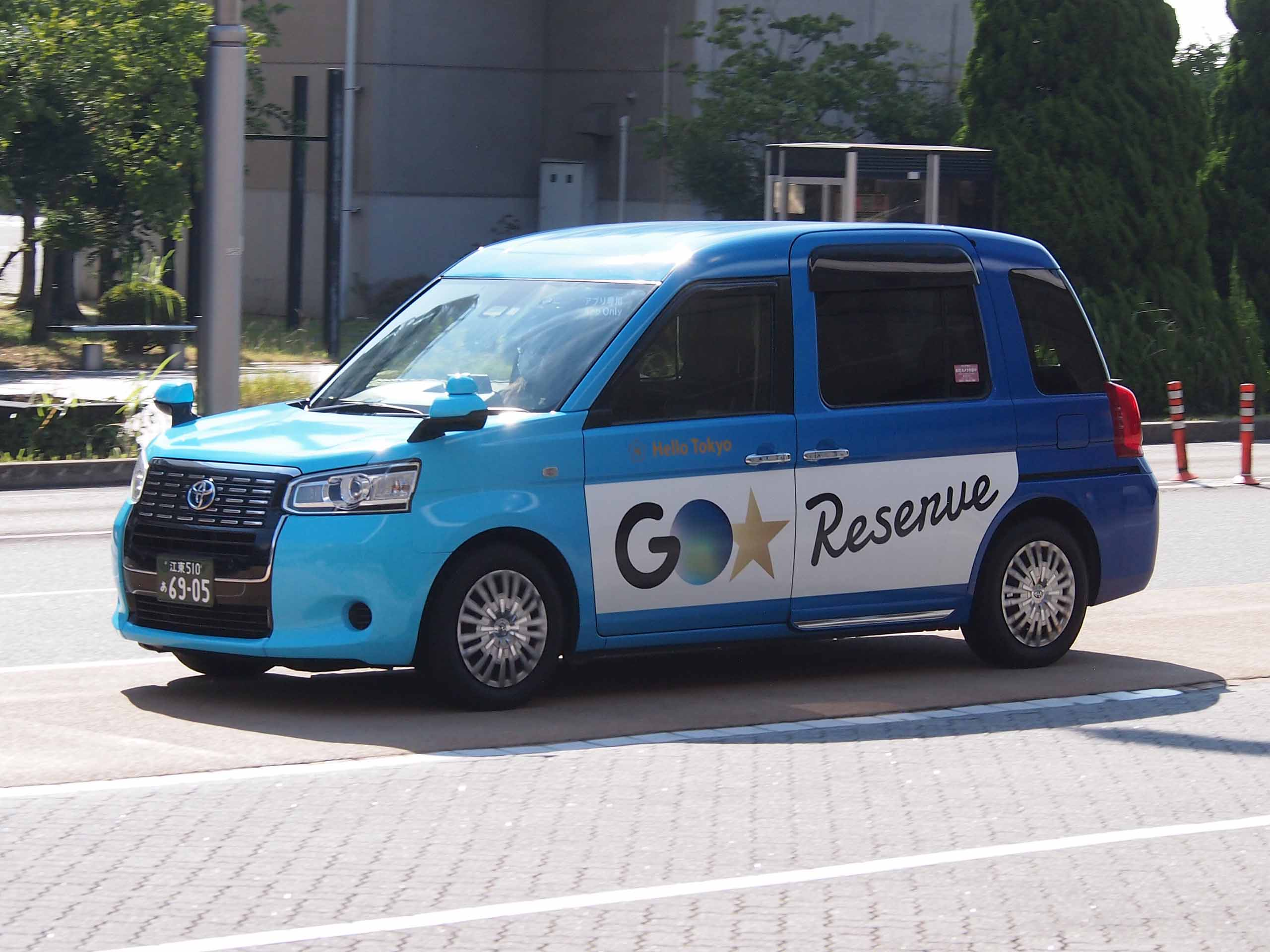
GO Reserve car (Hello Tokyo)

DRIVE CHART is a driving recorder for commercial vehicles and an associated safe-driving support system.

=== GO Reserve / GO Crew ===
GO Reserve is a line of Toyota Japan Taxis with special blue wrapping, whose driver is referred to as GO Crew. Partner companies are responsible for vehicle operation and crew employment, and GO only acts as an intermediary.

=== Taxi Industry GX Project ===
This project aims to replace regular combustion-engine taxis with electric vehicles and promote decarbonization. It plans to build an energy management system specialized for the taxi business, including vehicle leasing for taxi operators and the installation of rapid chargers.

=== Niseko Model ===
This project uses taxis to mitigate overtourism in winter.
