= DeNA =

Japanese provider of mobile portal and e-commerce websites

DeNA Co., Ltd.
- Logo used since 2013

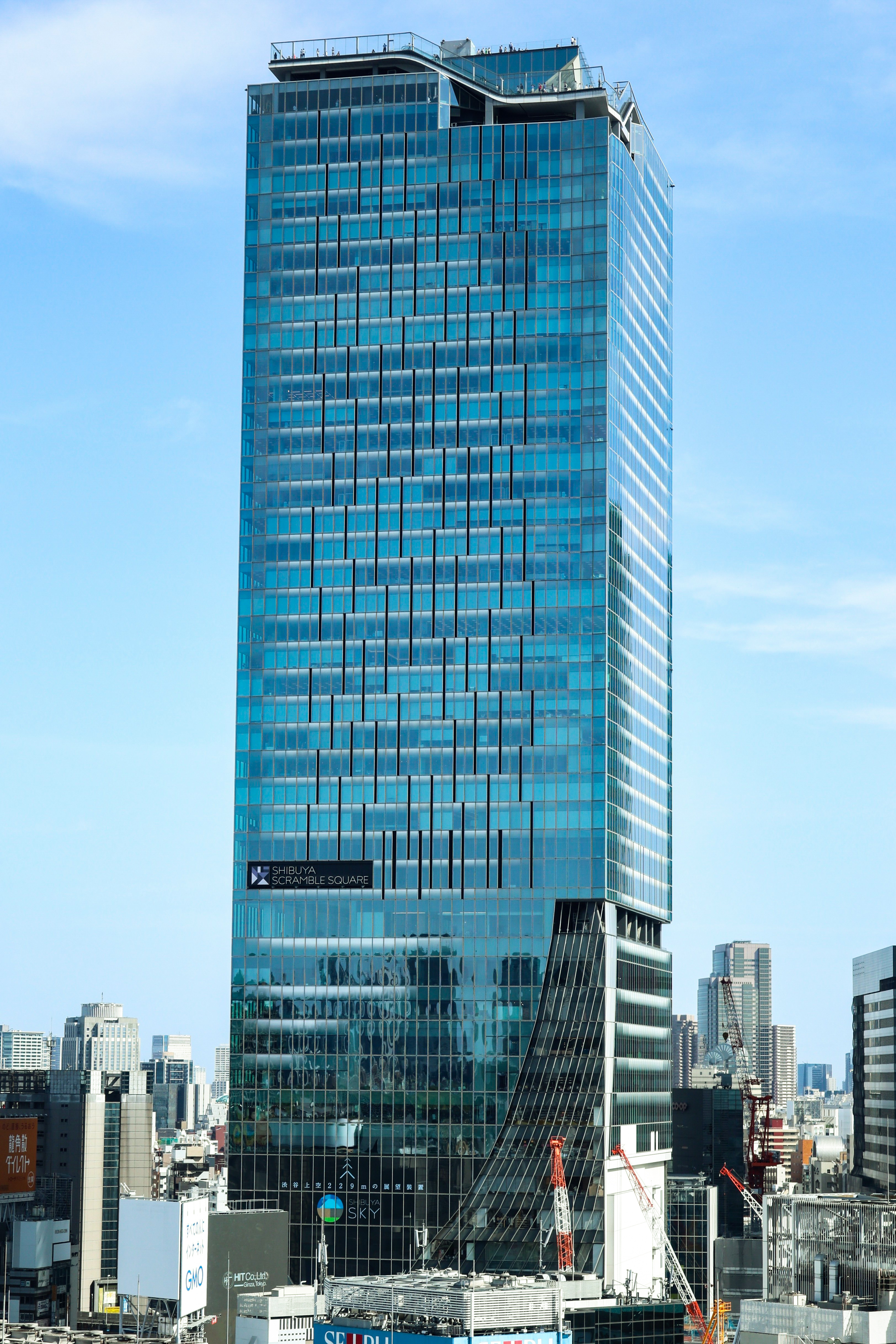
- DeNA's headquarters at Shibuya Scramble Square in Shibuya, Tokyo
- Native name: 株式会社ディー・エヌ・エー
- Type: Public (K.K)
- Traded as: TYO: 2432
- Industry: Social gaming; mobile portal; e-commerce; internet advertising
- Founded: 4 March 1999; 27 years ago Setagaya, Tokyo, Japan
- Founder: Tomoko Namba
- Headquarters: Shibuya, Tokyo, Japan
- Key people: Tomoko Namba (founder and executive chairman); Shingo Okamura (president and CEO); Shuhei Kawasaki (CTO)
- Revenue: US$1.8 billion (FY 2012)
- Owner: Tomoko Namba (16.70%); The Master Trust Bank of Japan, Ltd. (14.61%); Nintendo (12.72%); Custody Bank of Japan, Ltd. (5.20%)
- Number of employees: 2,483 (2026)
- Subsidiaries: Yokohama DeNA BayStars; Pokémon Card D Studio (66.6%)
- Website: Official website

DeNA Co., Ltd. (Japanese: 株式会社ディー・エヌ・エー, Hepburn: Kabushikigaisha Dī-Enu-Ē; pronounced "DNA") is a Japanese provider of mobile portal and e-commerce websites headquartered in Shibuya, Tokyo. It owns the Mobage cell phone platform and also operates other services, including the e-commerce website DeNA Shopping (formerly: Bidders).

== History ==
DeNA was founded in 1999 in Tokyo, Japan. The same year, it launched the online auction site Bidders. In 2004, it partnered with Index Corporation to launch the mobile auction site Mobaoku. A year later, the company listed on the Tokyo Stock Exchange.

In 2006, DeNA established the subsidiary Mobakore and launched the mobile gaming site Mobage Town as well as the mobile shopping site AU Shopping Mall. In 2009, DeNA saw $517 million in revenue, an increase of 28%. Among its biggest hits were Pirate Treasure, Hoshi-tsuku, and Kaito Royal. DeNA opened Mobage Town to third-party developers at the beginning of 2010, adding 59 partners and 148 game titles. It also partnered with Yahoo! Japan to launch a branded PC-based social game platform. By October 2010, Mobage had 20.5 million users and boasted 48 billion yen in sales of digital goods.

Despite the company's success in Japan, it had yet to make an impact on the global market. DeNA attempted to enter the Western market by acquiring a 20% share of the social gaming platform OpenFeint in 2009. In May 2010, it introduced MiniNation, a social games app consisting of four mini-games for iPhones and iPods, powered by OpenFeint. In October, it acquired the American game developer ngmoco for $400 million. Six months later, DeNA announced its intention to launch Mobage in the United States. A year later, it consolidated the latter's Plus+ with Mobage Town, which became known as Mobage. It also signed a deal with Samsung to be the default social network app on its mobile devices beginning in 2011.

In 2011, the Japan Fair Trade Commission issued a cease and desist order against DeNA, finding that it had violated Article 19 of the Antimonopoly Act by pressuring or forcing game developers to release titles only for the Mobage platform. GREE and KDDI subsequently filed suits against the company. In May, CEO and founder Tomoko Namba announced that she would step down in order to take care of her sick husband. In July, the company announced it would be working with industry legends Keiji Inafune, Suda 51, Yuji Naka, Noritaka Funamizu, and Yoshifumi Hashimoto to develop games for its Mobage platform.

During the 2010s, DeNA expanded as a global company. It brought Mobage to China in 2011, releasing it on Android in July and iOS in November. The platform had 20 games to start. The company entered into deals with Alibaba, Baidu, and Huawei to get Mobage on their mobile devices.

In July 2011, it set up a studio in Stockholm, Sweden. By August, the company set up DeNA Asia Pacific Holdings to manage its studios in South Korea and China. DeNA employed 400 developers by this time. It also made significant efforts to expand into Vietnam, acquiring Punch Entertainment's affiliate in the country in September and partnering with VNG Corporation to produce three social games for Mobage.

In February 2012, the company announced the formation of DeNA Canada in Vancouver to provide support to its Gameview subsidiary and other endeavors. DeNA moved its company headquarters to the Shibuya Hikarie skyscraper in Tokyo's Shibuya district in April. In June, it announced a partnership with Disney to develop and promote social network games, including the tower defense player Star Wars: Galactic Defense. It also created a partnership with the Chinese social network Renren to bring Mobage games to Chinese smartphones. In October, the company partnered with Yahoo! Kimo to bring Mobage to Taiwan, Hong Kong, and Macau. DeNA also acquired 20% of Cygames for 7.4 billion yen from CyberAgent. In November, the company announced it would be partnering with ten independent social and mobile game developers from China, New Zealand, Finland, France, Brazil, Canada, and the US to bring their games to Mobage on mobile devices.

DeNA joined the Entertainment Software Association trade group in January 2013. It also announced a partnership with Nexon to develop new games for Mobage. In March, Nomura Securities acquired 17.7 million shares of DeNA from Sony. The company shut down five of its Mobage titles in May: Ninja Royal, Infinity Blade Cross, We Rule, Aqua Collection, and Bokujou Hokkorina. In 2013, DeNA launched the Showroom app and browser, a live-streaming service primarily for Japanese idols and voice actors. In December, it created the Manga Box app.

In March 2015, Nintendo entered into a partnership with DeNA to develop mobile games based on its intellectual property. In July, DeNA announced it had acquired ownership of MyAnimeList. In December 2015, the company laid off a number of the 50-person staff at its Singapore office. Many others were transferred to its Vietnam office.

In 2016, the company closed its U.S. subsidiary, DeNA Global, Inc., due to lagging market interest.

In 2017, DeNA established an automotive division and created the ride-hailing app Takuberu, which operated in Kanagawa Prefecture and the city of Yokohama. A year later, it expanded the service nationwide and renamed the app MOV.

In 2019, Media Do Holdings Co., Ltd. acquired MyAnimeList from DeNA. On 31 August 2019, the company released Pokémon Masters on iOS and Android. It amassed $26 million in revenue in its first week and $33 million for the entire month.

In 2020, DeNA's automotive division merged with JapanTaxi Co., Ltd. and was renamed Mobility Technologies, Inc. The company had been working on its own ride-hailing app, and this was combined with "MOV" and subsequently named "GO".

In 2022, Nintendo and DeNA established a joint venture called Nintendo Systems to focus on the research and development of Nintendo accounts, with Nintendo owning 80% of the shares and DeNA owning 20%.

In 2024, one of DeNA's studios, DeNA Digital Production, which had been working on Pokemon TCG Pocket, was rebranded as Pokemon Card D Studio. It is 66.6% owned by DeNA and 33.4% by the Pokémon Company.

== Subsidiaries and products ==
=== Sports ===
In 2011, DeNA reached an agreement with TBS Holdings to purchase the professional baseball team Yokohama BayStars, which was eventually renamed Yokohama DeNA BayStars. The company acquired the basketball team Kawasaki Brave Thunders in 2018.

=== Entertainment ===
- SHOWROOM – live-streaming service, primarily for Japanese idols and voice actors
- Iriam Inc. – responsible for the VTuber app Iriam
- Knot, Inc. – operator of the AI-powered global recruitment platform Noxx

=== Mobile games and products ===
2006–2011

- Mobage – Mobile game platform
- Kaitō Royale

2012

- Blood Brothers
- Rage of Bahamut
- Marvel: War of Heroes
- HellFire: The Summoning
- Defender of Texel

2013

- Boney the Runner
- Transformers: Legends
- The Powerful: NYC
- NFL: Matchups
- G.I. Joe Battleground
- Monster Match
- Blood Battalion
- The Drowning
- Princess Slash And Dash
- Lawless
- The Gate (with Spicy Horse)
- Battle Quest: Rise of Heroes
- Final Fantasy Record Keeper

2014

- Engines of War
- Isolani
- Godus
- Super Battle Tactics
- Star Wars: Galactic Defense
- Cheese Guardians
- Hell Marys
- Cupcake Carnival
- Qube Kingdom
- Pirate Bash
- The Collectables (with Crytek)
- Shadow Wars
- Money Run
- Totem Warriors
- Transformers: Age of Extinction

2015

- One Piece Setting Sail!
- Blood Brothers 2
- Crash UFO
- Transformers: Battle Tactics
- Military Masters
- Rob and Roll
- Marvel Mighty Heroes
- Legend Borne
- Go Go Ghost
- HellFire: The Summoning

2016

- Miitomo (service infrastructure, My Nintendo integration, and development cooperation with Nintendo EPD)
- Super Mario Run (service infrastructure, My Nintendo integration, and development cooperation with Nintendo EPD)

2017

- Fire Emblem Heroes (service infrastructure, My Nintendo integration, and development cooperation with Intelligent Systems)
- Uta Macross Sma-Pho De-Culture
- Animal Crossing: Pocket Camp (service infrastructure, My Nintendo integration, and development cooperation with Nintendo EPD and NDcube)
- Megido 72
- PROGRAMMING ZEMI

2018

- Arena of Valor (service infrastructure, publishing cooperation with Tencent Games and TiMi Studios)
- SLAM DUNK from TV Animation

2019

- Pokémon Masters (development cooperation with the Pokémon Company)
- Mario Kart Tour (service infrastructure, My Nintendo integration, and development cooperation with Nintendo EPD)
- Attack on Titan: TACTICS
- Duel Masters PLAY'S

2021

- Argonavis from BanG Dream! AAside
- Touhou Danmaku Kagura
- Dragon Quest – The Adventure of Dai: A Hero's Bonds

2024

- Pokémon TCG Pocket
