= Bonus Bait =

Studio album by Mr. Scruff
- Released: 9 February 2009 (United Kingdom); 17 February 2009 (North America)
- Genre: Trip hop
- Label: Ninja Tune, Ninja Tuna
- Producer: Mr. Scruff

Mr. Scruff chronology
Ninja Tuna (2008)	Bonus Bait (2009)	Friendly Bacteria (2014)

Professional ratings
Review scores
Source	Rating
AllMusic	3.5/5 stars

Bonus Bait is a compilation album by British musician and DJ Andrew "Mr. Scruff" Carthy. It was released on 9 February 2009 by Ninja Tune, and features outtakes of his album Ninja Tuna.

In the United States, an MP3 double-album version of Ninja Tuna was released on 17 February, which included Bonus Bait as the second album.

== Track listing ==
All tracks are written by Mr. Scruff

No.	Title	Length
1.	"Bunch of Keys"	10:25
2.	"Rocking Chair"	5:59
3.	"Listen Up" (feat. Broke 'n' English)	3:27
4.	"Fix That Speaker!"	4:51
5.	"Giant Pickle"	4:28
6.	"Hold the Dub" (feat. Andreya Triana)	4:14
7.	"Cat & Mouse" (version 2)	7:11
8.	"The Clock"	5:10
9.	"Zen" (feat. Inja and Skuff)	3:52
10.	"Cat & Mouse"	5:12

== Personnel ==
- Mr. Scruff (Andrew Carthy) – all instruments, production
- Broke 'n' English (Delroy Pottinger and Johnny Wheeler) – vocals (3)
- Andreya Triana – vocals (6)
- Inja (Gareth Hue) and Skuff – vocals (9)
