= Bozo: The World's Most Famous Clown =

American animated television series

- Genre: Slapstick comedy and Animation
- Created by: Alan Livingston
- Written by: Alan Livingston; Charles Shows; Homer Brightman; Paul Fennell; Larry Harmon; Carl Kohler
- Directed by: Paul Fennell; Larry Harmon; Jerry Hathcock; Ed Solomon; Anatole Kirsanoff; Brad Case; Volus Jones; Tom Baron
- Voices of: Larry Harmon; Paul Frees
- Theme music composer: Gordon Zahler; Alec Compinsky
- Country of origin: United States
- Original language: English
- No. of seasons: 3
- No. of episodes: 157

Production
- Executive producer: Larry Harmon
- Producers: Paul Fennell; Theodore Ticktin
- Running time: 5 minutes
- Production company: Larry Harmon Pictures

Original release
- Release: 1958 – 1962

Bozo: The World's Most Famous Clown is a 1958–1962 American animated comedy television series based on the children's record book series, Bozo the Clown by Capitol Records. This series was produced by Larry Harmon Pictures, which began syndication in 1958. Lou Scheimer, of Filmation fame, was the art director for the series. The voice cast includes Larry Harmon starring as Bozo, with Paul Frees as the narrator.

A total of 157 five-minute shorts were produced: 20 in 1958, 85 in 1959 and 52 in 1962.

== Summary ==
The animated adventures of Bozo and his young sidekick Butch as they journey to wild places.

== Episode list ==
Season 1 (1958)
- 1. Bozo Meets the Creepy Gleep
- 2. Six Gun Fun
- 3. Horsefly in the Sky
- 4. Bozo Meets the Missing Link
- 5. A Slick Trick on Mopey Dick
- 6. Dinky Toots His Own Horn
- 7. The Space Ace Saves Face
- 8. Bird Brain Bozo
- 9. Bozo Meets King Glum of Gloom
- 10. Bozo's First Prize Surprise
- 11. Back to Back with Ack Ack Flack
- 12. 3 Cheers for the Rocketeers
- 13. Charliehorse of Another Color
- 14. Sailing the Sea with South Sea McGee
- 15. Doggone Dog
- 16. Bye Bye Fly Guy
- 17. Sea Serpent Seance
- 18. Flying Carpet Capers
- 19. Bozo's Bozo-Mow-Bile
- 20. Yoo-Hoo Kangaroo

Season 2 (1959)
- 21. Eager Beaver Bozo
- 22. Bozo the Lion Hearted
- 23. Bully for Bozo
- 24. Slippery Bly International Spy
- 25. The Beast with the Least
- 26. Big Deal on a Little Wheel
- 27. Whammy Bammy Al Kazami
- 28. Doubloon Goons
- 29. The Tin Can Man
- 30. Go-Go Ghosts
- 31. Hot Rod Bozo
- 32. Bear Hunter Bozo
- 33. Bozo the Moon Goon
- 34. Hark Hark the Shark
- 35. Hollywood Holdup
- 36. Funny Face Ace
- 37. Creepy Teepee
- 38. The Missing Sphinx of King Jinx
- 39. Please Please Hercules
- 40. Bozo's Nightmare Scare
- 41. Big Man in Tin Can
- 42. Deep Freeze Squeeze
- 43. Flying Shoes Blues
- 44. Shanghai Shenanigans
- 45. Million Dollar Mutt
- 46. Spy Guy Surprise
- 47. Ill Will Chills
- 48. Sir Bozo and the Fire Breathing Dragon
- 49. Copter Cap Capers
- 50. Bozo Meets Mister Monster
- 51. Beanstalk Bozo
- 52. Red Riding Hood Hoodwinks
- 53. Chills and Thrills with Boothill McGill
- 54. Know what this is about?
- 55. Admiral Bozo Beats the Fleet
- 56. Oodles Duck's Dilemma
- 57. Injun Fun
- 58. Scooter Trouble Shooter
- 59. Injun-eer Bozo
- 60. Goldilocks Yocks
- 61. Mish Mash Magic
- 62. Okey Dokey Smokey
- 63. Coney Island Capers
- 64. Ozark Lark
- 65. Horse Thief Grief
- 66. Ship Shape Ape
- 67. Tough Luck Duck
- 68. Missing Missile Fizzle
- 69. Tally-Ho, Bozo
- 70. Dragon Lagoon
- 71. Broken Bones Jones
- 72. Bozo's Ape Escape
- 73. Horse Hoof Hoofer
- 74. Pint Size Surprise
- 75. Kitty Kat Spat
- 76. Fire Fighter Flyer
- 77. Monster Madness
- 78. Stormy Knight Fright
- 79. Baby Sitter's Jitters
- 80. Sheep Thief Grief
- 81. Chicken Hearted Bozo
- 82. Good Deed Indeed
- 83. Bulldog Bully
- 84. Yoo-Hoo Uranium
- 85. Space Gun Fun
- 86. Knight Fight Fright
- 87. Go Go Go Bozo
- 88. Wild Hare Scare
- 89. Bowler Bozo
- 90. Bozo and the Corny Crow
- 91. Super Salesman Bozo
- 92. Good Luck Duck
- 93. Bo-Peep's Sheep
- 94. Termite Flight Fright
- 95. Rootin' Tootin' Six Gun Shootin'
- 96. Gag Bag Bozo
- 97. Three Bear Scare
- 98. Mail Man's Mixup
- 99. Bozo's Spunky Monkey
- 100. Paleface Chase
- 101. Killer Diller Miller
- 102. Ship Shape Ship Mates
- 103. Bozo and the Space Pirates
- 104. Creepy Crenshaw the Bungling Burglar
- 105. Space Ace Elvis

Season 3 (1962)
- 106. Texas Stranger Danger
- 107. Super Duper Trouble Shooter
- 108. Go-Go Pogo-Pogo
- 109. Big Lab Confab
- 110. Square Shootin' Square
- 111. Car Thief Grief
- 112. Broad Sword Discord
- 113. Big Boo Boo on a Fast Choo Choo
- 114. Food Pest Jest
- 115. Bad News Cruise
- 116. Whipper Snapper Snipper
- 117. Tip Top Bell Hop
- 118. Fish Tanks Pranks
- 119. Real Gone Leprechaun
- 120. Lake Resort Sport
- 121. Eagle's Nest Pest
- 122. Rickety Rackety Rocketeer
- 123. Little Naggin' Dragon
- 124. Big Dealer on a Stearn Wheeler
- 125. Hop-Chest Quest
- 126. Mill Pond Thrill Chill
- 127. Piggy Bank Prank
- 128. Charter Service Nervous
- 129. Sidewalk Peddler's Meddler
- 130. Razzle Dazzle Castle Hassle
- 131. Four Flusher Gusher
- 132. The Big Cake Bake
- 133. Show Biz Whiz
- 134. Papoose on the Loose
- 135. Hurricane Belinda
- 136. Ski Lodge Hodge Podge
- 137. Chicken Burglar Bungler
- 138. Manhunt Stunts
- 139. Big Tree Spree
- 140. Teeny Weeny Meany
- 141. Rockey's Snack Attack
- 142. Fast Pace Sky Chase
- 143. A Glutton for Mutton
- 144. South of the Border Disorder
- 145. Okey Dokey Hokey Pokey
- 146. Big Flop Train Hop
- 147. Pie in the Eye Guy
- 148. Big Clown Shake-Down
- 149. Film-Flam for Ali Kablam
- 150. All Mind Gold Mine
- 151. Ball Park Lark
- 152. Bozo's Icy Escapade
- 153. High Fly Rug Spy
- 154. Freeloader Railroader
- 155. Gate Crasher Smasher
- 156. Happy Gas Gasser
- 157. Dance of the Ants

== Broadcasting history ==
Japan

In Japan, the show was dubbed into Japanese, and titled "ゆかいなボゾ" (lit. The Merry Bozo). It was broadcast on Fuji TV from August 22, 1960 to July 11, 1961. The show was sponsored exclusively by Nihon Kotsu Bozo was voiced by Takuya Fujioka in this dub.
