= Solid Steel =

Compilation album series released by Ninja Tune

Solid Steel are a series of DJ mix albums issued on Ninja Tune, an independent record label in the UK.

Solid Steel also has a radio station webcast and related live concerts which further showcase the DJing talents of such artists.

In 1988, Solid Steel began as a radio show on Kiss FM hosted by Coldcut's Matt Black and Jonathan More, where they were not only able to play and mix records, but also display their cut-up technique live. The show was known for airing "The Broadest Beats in London." They were joined by PC and Strictly Kev from DJ Food in 1993. The two-hour show was filled by improv, with each DJ taking sets of 30 minutes. In 1997, Darren Knott, otherwise known as DK, joined the show as producer as Coldcut and DJ Food were increasingly away on tour.

They left Kiss FM in 1999 after playlist changes meant they would be consigned to the Tuesday 2 am – 4 am graveyard slot. The show was still recorded each week, being available online and syndicated worldwide. In 1999, they were offered a slot on the advertisement-free BBC's London Live radio station and were on the station until 2002. This unique 2-hour show has expanded to include guest mixes, regular video mixes (often the No. 1 video podcast on iTunes) and the additional 1-hour podcast highlights, regularly featuring in the top 10 music podcasts on iTunes, with over 3 million downloads to date and hosted on the Ninja Tune SoundCloud each week.

In 2012, Solid Steel joined Strongroom Alive internet radio to perform a weekly live show on Thursday nights (7 – 9 pm). Other shows include Ross Allen, Clash + Dazed magazine. The show is hosted by Jon More (Coldcut), and he is often joined by DK, DJ Food and rolling guests.

Guest mixes and interviews have featured most of the Ninja Tune roster as well as many other artists and DJs, including Four Tet, Skream, Norman Jay, Robot Koch, Goldie, Tim Healey, Company Flow, Jackmaster, Z-Trip, Steinski, Seiji, Pearson Sound, DJ Kentaro, Toddla T, Freestylers, Hudson Mohawke, DJ Marky, DJ Yoda, Diplo, Ben Westbeech, Cut Chemist, DJ Shadow, 4hero, Andy Smith, Laurent Garnier, Kenny Dope, RJD2, Amorphous Androgynous, Alec Empire, The Orb, Robert Owens, Portico Quartet, Kutmah, Pinch, Trevor Jackson, Machinedrum, FaltyDL, De La Soul, Double Dee & Steinski, David Axelrod, Ken Nordine, Jean-Jacques Perrey, Quannum Projects, Juan Atkins, Mr. Scruff, Kid Koala, Bonobo, Daedelus, Luke Vibert, and Antipop Consortium.

The first Solid Steel album was released by DJ Food and DK in 2001.

== Solid Steel discography ==
Album information
Now, Listen!
- Artist / DJ: DJ Food & DK
- Released: October 2001
- Label: Ninja Tune
- Cat no: ZENCD 055
Listen & Learn
- Artist / DJ: Hexstatic
- Released: 27 January 2003
- Label: Ninja Tune
- Cat no: ZENCD 075
Herbal Blend
- Artist / DJ: The Herbaliser
- Released: September 2003
- Label: Ninja Tune
- Cat no: ZENCD 083
Recorded Live
- Artist / DJ: Amon Tobin
- Released: 12 July 2004
- Label: Ninja Tune
- Cat no: ZENCD 090
Keep It Solid Steel Volume 1
- Artist / DJ: Mr Scruff
- Released: September 2004
- Label: Ninja Tune
- Cat no: ZENCD 084
On the Wheels of Solid Steel
- Artist / DJ: DJ Kentaro
- Released: 5 September 2005
- Label: Ninja Tune
- Cat no: ZENCD 109
It Came from the Sea
- Artist / DJ: Bonobo
- Released: 3 October 2005
- Label: Ninja Tune
- Cat no: ZENCD 107
Now, Listen Again!
- Artist / DJ: DJ Food & DK
- Released: 2 April 2007
- Label: Ninja Tune
- Cat no: ZENCD 123

== Radio stations playing the Solid Steel show ==
- "The Move," XM Satellite Radio – United States
- 106FM – Israel
- 2SER – Sydney, Australia
- 3PBS – Melbourne, Australia
- 95bfm – Auckland, New Zealand
- Dinamo FM – Turkey
- FM4 – Austria
- FSK Hamburg – Hamburg, Germany
- Juice 107.2 – Brighton, UK
- Radio 3 Fach – Lucerne, Switzerland
- Radio Active – Wellington, New Zealand
- Radio B92 – Belgrade, Serbia
- Radio Campus – France
- Radio Magnetic – Glasgow, Scotland
- Radio National – Australia
- Radio Solid Steel – Russia
- Resonance FM 104.4 FM – London, UK
- Triple J – Australia
- UMFM 101.5 fm – Manitoba, Canada

== See also ==
- DJ-Kicks
