= Punch Entertainment =

American video game developer (2005–2011)

Punch Entertainment, Inc.
- Type: Subsidiary
- Industry: Video games
- Founded: 2005; 21 years ago
- Founder: Tobin Lent
- Defunct: September 19, 2011
- Fate: Merged with Aeria Games
- Headquarters: Palo Alto, California, US
- Key people: Tobin Lent (CEO)
- Parent: Aeria Games (2011)

Punch Entertainment, Inc. was an American video game developer based in Palo Alto, California. Founded in 2005 by Tobin Lent, the company established a Vietnamese satellite studio that same year. In September 2011, Punch Entertainment sold off its Vietnamese studio to DeNA and its US-based staff to Aeria Games.

== History ==
The company was founded in 2005 by Tobin Lent, who became the company's chief executive officer. The US-based staff of Punch Entertainment was acquired by Aeria Games on September 19, 2011, and moved to Aeria Games' headquarters in Santa Clara, California.

=== Punch Entertainment (Vietnam) ===
Punch Entertainment (Vietnam) Co., Ltd. is a Vietnamese video game developer. It was established as a satellite office for Punch Entertainment on June 20, 2005. On September 12, 2011, DeNA purchased the studio with its approximately 50 employees. The acquisition was completed on September 15; terms were not disclosed. DeNA sold it to Evolabel Asia in May 2017. As of October 31, 2017, Punch Entertainment (Vietnam) employs 115 people in its offices in Hanoi and Ho Chi Minh City.

== Games ==
- Ego
- Reign of Swords
- Boom Goes the Earth 3D
- Gunslinger
- Hunting Unlimited
