= Scoreloop =

- Founded: 2008
- Defunct: 1 December 2014
- Parent: RIM (2011-2014)
- Website: scoreloop.com at the Wayback Machine (archived 2013-02-15)

Scoreloop AG was a German company that operated a social gaming network. Its software was cross-platform and supported Blackberry Tablet OS, BlackBerry 10, Android, Bada, iOS and Windows Phone 7.

== History ==
Scoreloop was based in Munich, Germany, raising US$2.8 million to help create the service that they founded in 2008. Early Investors included Earlybird Venture Capital and Target Partners.

In March 2010, Scoreloop gave developers that used its service the ability to monetize their apps using the company's services. The network was among the first to add support for Android apps. During August 2010, Scoreloop revealed that its user base was growing by over 100,000 new users per day.

On June 7, 2011, Scoreloop was acquired by BlackBerry for US$71 million.

On July 8, 2014, BlackBerry announced that the Scoreloop service is to be discontinued starting December 1, 2014 and encouraged all developers to remove all Scoreloop features and integrations from their developed games.

== See also ==
- List of social gaming networks
