= DJ Kentaro =

- Born: Kentaro Okamoto
- Origin: Tokyo, Japan
- Genres: Hip-hop, electro, drum and bass
- Occupations: Musician; DJ
- Years active: 2000–present
- Labels: Ninja Tune, Pressure Sounds
- Website: djkentaro.com

Kentaro Okamoto (born c.1982), better known as DJ Kentaro, is a Japanese musician and DJ. He won third place in the Technics category of the DMC World DJ Final in 2001 and won it in 2002 at the age of 20. In doing so, he became one of the first persons of Asian descent to win the DMC World DJ Final, receiving the highest score in DMC history in the process.

He was signed to independent record label Ninja Tune and released a Solid Steel DJ mix album in September 2005, entitled On The Wheels of Solid Steel. The tracks on the album come exclusively from Ninja Tune's back catalogue.

His first album of entirely original material, Enter, was released on April 30, 2007.

Kentaro recently supported hip-hop artists The Roots and The Pharcyde. Kentaro is well known for having remixed various songs of Japanese megastar Ayumi Hamasaki. Kentaro was featured by Soil & "Pimp" Sessions on their 2013 album Circles.

== DJ Awards ==
- 2002 DMC World Final - Champion
- 2002 DMC Japan Final - Champion
- 2001 DMC World Final - 3rd place
- 2001 DMC Japan Final - Champion
- 2001 Teens DJ Championships - Champion
- 2000 VESTAX Extravaganza - World Finalist
- 2000 ITF Japan - 2nd place

== Discography ==
=== Albums ===
- On the Wheels of Solid Steel (2004), Beat (reissued 2005, Ninja Tune)
- Enter: DJ Kentaro (2007), Ninja Tune (includes appearances by Spank Rock and Pharcyde)
- Pressure Sounds Presents: "Tuff Cuts" DJ Kentaro's Crucial Mix (2008), Pressure Sounds (reggae mix)
- Nama: Live Mix (2008), Endeavor Entertainment (includes tracks by Hexstatic, Spank Rock, Squarepusher and DJ Kentaro's own tracks)
- Contrast (2012), Ninja Tune
- Jaran (2017), TREKKIE TRAX
- Wakataka (2018), Endeavor Entertainment Ltd.

=== DVD ===
- Enter the Newground Live!! (2008), Ninja Tune

=== Singles ===
- "Harvest Dance" (2007), Beat
- "Trust" (2007), Ninja Tune
- "Free" (2007), Ninja Tune
- "New Future" (2018), Endeavor Entertainment Ltd.
- "Matsuri" (2022), Endeavor Entertainment Ltd.
