= Friendly Bacteria =

Studio album by Mr. Scruff
- Released: 19 May 2014
- Recorded: 2013–2014
- Genre: Electronica, trip hop, nu jazz
- Length: 54:01
- Label: Ninja Tune, Ninja Tuna
- Producer: Mr. Scruff

Mr. Scruff chronology
Bonus Bait (2009)	Friendly Bacteria (2014)

Friendly Bacteria is the fifth studio album by the British musician and DJ Mr. Scruff. It was released on 19 May 2014 by the labels Ninja Tune/Ninja Tuna simultaneously.

== Background ==
According to Mr. Scruff, the album would "display a stripped-back musicality, a depth that maybe hasn't been there before", and musically it would be "tougher, sparser, [with] less samples, more bass. More vocals and collaborations and shorter tunes".

On 28 February 2014, "Render Me", a song that would ultimately be featured in the album, was streamed on YouTube via Mr. Scruff's official channel.

== Track listing ==
All tracks are written by Mr. Scruff

No.	Title	Length
1.	"Stereo Breath" (feat. Denis Jones)	3:59
2.	"Render Me" (feat. Denis Jones)	4:42
3.	"Deliverance"	4:14
4.	"Thought to the Meaning" (feat. Denis Jones)	3:09
5.	"Friendly Bacteria"	3:55
6.	"Come Find Me" (feat. Vanessa Freeman)	4:54
7.	"Where Am I?"	3:45
8.	"He Don't" (feat. Robert Owens)	4:22
9.	"What?"	3:19
10.	"We Are Coming"	6:00
11.	"Catch Sound" (feat. Denis Jones)	4:14
12.	"Feel Free"	7:28

== Personnel ==
- Mr. Scruff (Andrew Carthy) – all instruments, production
- Denis Jones – vocals (1, 2, 4, 11)
- Vanessa Freeman – vocals (6)
- Robert Owens – vocals (8)
