= Eliminate Pro =

2009 video game

- The appstore icon for Eliminate Pro
- Developer: Ngmoco
- Publisher: E technology
- Platform: iOS
- Release: December 6, 2009
- Genre: First-person shooter

Eliminate Pro was a first-person shooter developed for iOS by Ngmoco. Ngmoco has stopped development on it, and in May 2012 shut off the login/game servers and removed it from the Apple App Store. Eliminate was based on the open-source Quake 3 engine.

== Gameplay ==
The player moves their character by moving the virtual joystick at the bottom left of the screen, while double-tapping and holding this button down will activate rapid fire. They shoot by pressing the bottom right of the screen. Zooming can be achieved by hitting the center cross hairs (this can be disabled in Options). The character jumps when the player presses the bottom of the screen. The player can switch weapons by hitting the top right of the screen. Only two weapons at maximum can be used in one match.

Eliminate uses a capacity-limited freemium model. Although all features are unlocked when the game is first downloaded, players cannot earn credits for their wins without energized suits. A suit can have three full energy charges, each charge requiring two hours of waiting. When a player's "suit", their armor, is fully charged, the player can play three matches. With in-app purchases, players can purchase power cells, to spend on energy without waiting, or on credits to upgrade and purchase gear. Players can play without energy, however they are not awarded credits once the battle is finished. Their wins and kills are still recorded. Player Ranks in Eliminate are earned by credits (reaching a certain threshold of credits), although the "Skill" number more closely indicates the players skill. Eliminate uses the Plus+ social network.
