= MazeFinger =

2008 video game

- MazeFinger appstore icon
- Developer(s): ngmoco
- Publisher(s): ngmoco
- Platform(s): iOS
- Release: October 17, 2008
- Genre(s): Puzzle video game

MazeFinger is a game developed and published by ngmoco for the iOS platform. It is available for download on the iPhone and iPod Touch on the App Store or iTunes.

== Gameplay ==
In MazeFinger, players have to complete mazes by dragging their finger along the path of the maze without touching the sides, slowing the player down. Each level is composed of 5 different mazes and these 5 mazes have to be completed before the energy bar runs out and the game is over. There are 200 levels with over 1000 unique mazes. As players progress through harder mazes, they increase in difficulty. There are traps, blockers and energy pickups in some mazes. Players can also send challenges to friends and also compete on the Plus+ service for places on leaderboard and to unlock achievements.
