= Pokémon Trading Card Game Pocket =

2024 mobile video game

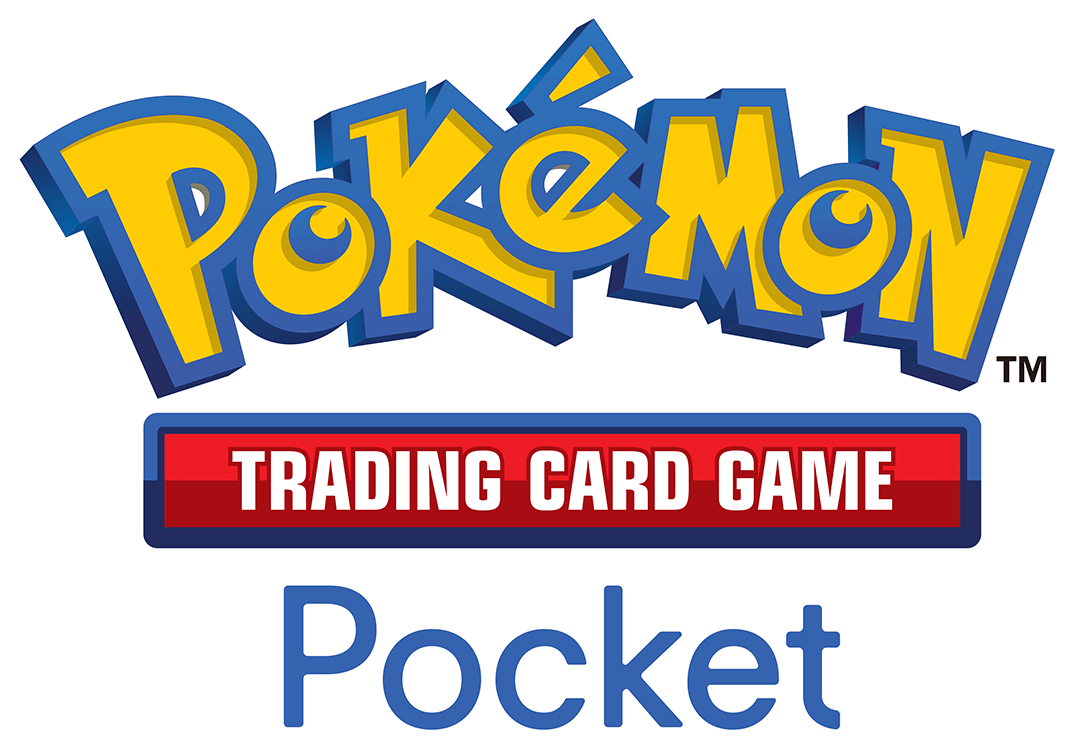
- Developers: Creatures Inc.; DeNA
- Publisher: The Pokémon Company
- Directors: Seitaro Mizuno; Hotaka Suzuki
- Producers: Tetsuya Iguchi; Yuji Kitano; Keita Hirobe
- Designers: Goki Miura; Katsuyuki Shiga
- Artist: Akio Oyama
- Composers: dattxua Takuto Kitsuta
- Series: Pokémon
- Platforms: iOS, Android
- Release: September 26, 2024 (New Zealand); October 30, 2024 (worldwide)
- Genre: Digital collectible card game
- Mode: Multiplayer

Pokémon Trading Card Game Pocket (often abbreviated as Pokémon TCG Pocket) is a free-to-play mobile adaptation of the Pokémon Trading Card Game (TCG), developed by Creatures Inc. and DeNA, and published by The Pokémon Company. The game was revealed on February 27, 2024 during a Pokémon Presents presentation, had a soft-launch in New Zealand on September 26, 2024, and officially released on October 30, 2024 on both iOS and Android devices. Pokémon TCG Pocket serves as a mobile adaptation of the traditional trading card game, allowing players to collect cards, trade with friends, and build decks to engage in battles against other players. The game incorporates features designed for mobile gameplay, including daily rewards, while maintaining the core mechanics of the original TCG.

The game has received generally positive reviews from critics, who highlighted its accessibility and ease of use, though its free-to-play mechanics have been criticized. As of February 2025, the game has been downloaded more than 100 million times, having additionally made over $500 million USD in revenue. The game was nominated for "Best Mobile Game" at The Game Awards 2024.

== Gameplay ==
A battle in Pokémon Trading Card Game Pocket. The player's Marowak ex attacks the opponent's Dragonite.

Pokémon TCG Pocket centers around opening digital booster packs and collecting the cards inside. Later on, the player can build decks with the cards to battle against other players. A booster pack contains five cards and can be opened every 12 hours, which can be reduced by an hour with "Pack Hourglasses". Multiple hourglasses can be used to reduce the waiting time further, but once a pack is opened, it will go back to 12 hours. A monthly "Premium Pass" subscription lets the player open an extra pack each day. Players receive pack points from opening packs, which players can exchange for individual cards in an in-game shop. In addition to opening packs, the player can use a "Wonder Pick", in which the player will get one random card out of a pack another player had opened. Additional features include players being able to view their card collection, build a deck of cards for use in battle, and the ability to make friends with other players of the game.

Battling consists of a simplified version of the physical card game. Players put one Pokémon in combat while others remain on the "bench". Players draw cards and obtain one energy each turn. Energy is used to allow Pokémon to attack. Pokémon can be evolved into stronger forms while other cards can be used to provide support for cards on the field, which can give players an edge in battle. Players attempt to use their Pokémon to deal damage and deplete the health of opposing Pokémon. A player wins when they get three points, which are awarded for defeating Pokémon. Players can battle against other players online. Ranked, competitive online battles, which use a leaderboard, were added to the game in March 2025. In solo matches, players can optionally use an auto-battle feature that allows the game’s AI to play on their behalf.

Trading in Pokémon TCG Pocket allows players to exchange cards with friends, requiring both shinedust, which can be replenished by players gaining copies of cards they already own, and trade stamina, which regenerate over time or can be replenished with trade hourglasses. However, trades are subject to several restrictions: cards must be of the same rarity, and certain high-rarity or promotional cards cannot be traded. Additionally, cards with special flair must be exchanged for others with flair, and players can only have one active trade at a time. A setting also allows players to disable incoming trade offers. Originally, the system required a currency called trade tokens, gained by consuming copies of rare cards, in place of shinedust. An update for the game removed trade tokens and replaced them with shinedust as the required currency.

=== Expansions ===
The game launched with both the Genetic Apex set, split across three booster packs, and the Promo-A set. Each set consists of a base of unique new cards, and a smaller number of rarer alternative artwork versions of the base cards. The game's second expansion, Mythical Island, was released on December 12, 2024, and contained one booster pack. Since 2025, expansions have released on a roughly monthly cadence. Each expansion offers new cards from which to build decks, new single-player challenges, and new cosmetic items for players to customise their decks and display their collections. Outside of expansions, time limited promotional events and challenges have also awarded new cards and cosmetic items. Some promotional cards can only be obtained by spending money.

== Development and release ==
The concept for an app dedicated exclusively to digital Pokémon cards began to take shape around the time of Pokémon Go's initial release. Executive corporate officer Keita Hirobe stated that making the game more approachable and maintaining a low barrier to entry were two of The Pokémon Company's primary objectives during development. An emphasis was placed on "the fun of opening packs and collecting cards". During development, developer DeNA renamed its subsidiary, DeNA Digital Productions, to Pokémon Card D Studio, with the name change taking effect in April 2024. This was done to refocus development on the production of the game.

Pokémon Trading Card Game Pocket was revealed on February 27, 2024 during a Pokémon Presents. The game's announcements caused a significant increase in developer DeNA's share price. At the closing ceremonies of the Pokémon World Championships in Hawaii, a new trailer for the game was released, revealing its official release date of October 30, 2024. In August, the Pokémon Company announced over 6 million people had pre-registered for the game. Ahead of its worldwide release, the game was soft‑launched in New Zealand in September 2025. Reportedly, many players had spoofed their location to play the game early. Shortly before release, a commemorative event was held in Japan showcasing the game, explaining the game's mechanics and featuring a demonstration of its gameplay, and advertisements were filmed and released featuring actress Sairi Ito.

Upon the game's release, it quickly garnered 2 million downloads in its first day. By November, it had been downloaded 30 million times, and within six weeks of release, it had been downloaded over 60 million times. By February 2025, the game had been downloaded more than 100 million times. In December 2024, developer DeNA stated that the game was among its highest in terms of player retention. The game partnered with American fast food chain McDonald's for a promotion in January 2025, with Happy Meals including physical Pokémon cards as well as digital in-game rewards.

== Reception ==
Reception

Aggregate score
Aggregator	Score
Metacritic	75/100

Review scores
Publication	Score
Eurogamer	4/5
Pocket Gamer	4/5
Shacknews	6/10

Pokémon Trading Game Pocket received "generally favorable" reviews according to review aggregator Metacritic. Chris Tapsell, writing for Eurogamer, spoke positively of the game, praising its reward system, friendliness to players who did not wish to spend money, and player versus player battling system. Ana Diaz, writing for Polygon, and Jupiter Hadley, writing for Pocket Gamer, praised the fun of opening packs and collecting cards, highlighting the special artwork and visual effects of rare cards, but neither considered the game play of battling opponents very interesting. Jordan Minor, writing for PCMag, highlighted the game for taking advantage of several mechanics that were intrinsic to the original Trading Card Game's success, including the suspense of opening trading card boosters and the community aspect of sharing and trading cards. He criticized the game's battling system, finding it dull and uninteresting compared to the rest of the game.

Moises Taveras, writing for Kotaku, called the game "good, bite-sized fun" but criticized it for revolving too heavily around gacha mechanics. Taveras also wrote of his wariness of the loss of the game's digital content when it reached its end of service. Minor also criticized the game's gacha game model, as did Hadley, who disliked the amount of waiting the game involved to obtain rewards. Keza MacDonald, writing in a positive review for The Guardian, stated that the game's "free to play" model was not overly intrusive for players, finding the game's system preferable to physical cards. Donovan Erskine, writing for Shacknews, believed the game's gameplay loop to be preying on players' desire to obtain new cards, stating that the ease of accessibility in the game's digital format made the game easier to spend money on than physical cards.

Among players, Pocket Gamer cited the game as being "the closest thing to Pokémania since 2016’s Pokémon Go", attributing the game's comparative success to other Pokémon mobile titles as being due to the game's nostalgia factor, as the original launch of cards predominantly used species found in the first Pokémon series games, as well as more recent and recognizable fan favorite Pokémon. The inclusion of Mew, unlockable via a secret quest, was also cited as being at the forefront of various "playground rumors" regarding the game, which helped elicit the same feeling of nostalgia. Jakub Remiar, in another article for the site, found that the game's nostalgia helped lure in people who had played the original games growing up, with its accessibility for newer players allowing it to rope in those same players. MacDonald also cited this sentiment, believing the game also had appeal due to being the first of the Trading Card Game's attempts to expand onto mobile phones to be received positively. Joshua Yehl, conversely, wrote for IGN that the differences between Pocket's gameplay and the main card game's had alienated some players, especially due to the recent release of Pokémon Trading Card Game Live, which directly adapted the game's gameplay for a mobile client but was met with negative reviews. Yehl stated that the community wanted a more direct adaptation, though stated that some felt the game helped provide a jumping off point for players who wanted to get into the card game but were put-off by the main game's more complicated ruleset.

=== Controversies ===
The introduction of the game's trading system caused minor controversy within the game's player base, as many disliked the requirement of a "stamina" system to trade, as well as restrictions placed on which cards could be traded. Many players cancelled their premium subscriptions for the game in protest. The protest resulted in changes to the system being announced by the developers.

In July 2025, the artist lanjiujiu found similarities between artwork for the Ho-Oh EX card, released as part of the Wisdom of Sea and Sky expansion, and fan art he had made in 2021. Fans subsequently accused the game of plagiarism. The Pokémon Company removed the card, as well another associated card, from the game, and replaced them with placeholders, stating that the team behind production of cards for the game had provided "incorrect reference materials" to the artist of the card. The cards would later receive new art a week later.

=== Awards ===
Year	Award	Category	Result	Ref.
2024	The Game Awards	Best Mobile Game	Nominated	
2025	Japan Game Awards	Movement Award	Won	
2025	Pocket Gamer Mobile Games Awards	Game of the Year	Won	
2025	Google Play Best of 2025	Best Game	Won	
2025	2025 App Store Awards	iPhone Game of the Year	Won	

=== Revenue ===
There was initially concern the game would not fare well financially due to the presence of a pre-existing Pokémon Trading Card Game mobile game in the form of Pokémon Trading Card Game Live. The game's initial soft launch in New Zealand in September 2024 was small, earning $15,000 USD in daily spending. When the game released worldwide in October 2024, it grossed $2.7 million USD in its first day, and its first week was the second strongest for earnings in the Pokémon franchise's mobile game history. In the game's first seventeen days of release, it had earned over $100 million USD. Within the game's first month, it made $200 million USD in earnings, with an estimated $3 million being earned per day, more money than fellow Pokémon mobile game Pokémon Go was making in the same period by nearly three times as much. Within ten weeks, the game's earnings passed $400 million USD in earnings, and though spending dipped briefly in January 2025, the release of the Space-Time Smackdown expansion brought the game's earnings to over $500 million USD.

The game's revenue has caused DeNA's profits to grow significantly, with the company reporting a 8,126.8% increase in profit as a result of the game.
