= Keep It Unreal =

Studio album by Mr. Scruff
- Released: 7 June 1999
- Recorded: 1998–1999
- Genres: Electronica: breakbeat; downtempo; trip hop; electro swing
- Length: 65:02
- Label: Ninja Tune

Mr. Scruff chronology
Mr. Scruff (1997)	Keep It Unreal (1999)	Heavyweight Rib Ticklers (2002)

Professional ratings
Review scores
Source	Rating
AllMusic	4/5 stars
NME	7/10
Q	3/5 stars

Keep It Unreal is the second studio album by English disc jockey Andrew Carthy, under the alias Mr. Scruff. It includes the hit single "Get a Move On!", which is an electro swing track built upon samples of Moondog's "Bird's Lament (In Memory of Charlie Parker)" alongside vocals from T-Bone Walker's "Hypin' Woman Blues". The album ends with "Fish", a track made up of samples about marine life, which is a motif of Mr. Scruff. Samples used in the track include the likes of David Attenborough and David Bellamy. It was re-released in 2009 as a 10th anniversary two disc set.

== Track listing (original version) ==
All tracks written by Andy Carthy (Except where noted)

1. "Is He Ready..." (Mary Anne Hobbs intro) - 0:15
2. "Spandex Man" (featuring Clive Hunte on bass n effects) - 4:41
3. "Get a Move On!" (featuring Sneaky of Fingathing) - 7:36
4. "Midnight Feast" - 3:36
5. "Honeydew" (featuring Fi) (A Carthy / F Ball) - 6:35
6. "Cheeky" - 5:36
7. "So Long" - 4:14
8. "Chipmunk" - 5:08
9. "Do You Hear" - 4:49
10. "Shanty Town" - 3:47
11. "JusJus" (featuring Roots Manuva) (A Carthy / R Smith) - 4:06
12. "Blackpool Roll" - 4:51
13. "Travelogue" - 5:25
14. "Fish" - 4:23

== Track listing (10th anniversary edition) ==
CD1

1. "Is He Ready..." (Mary Anne Hobbs intro)
2. "Spandex Man" (featuring Clive Hunte on bass n effects)
3. "Get a Move On" (featuring Sneaky of Fingathing)
4. "Midnight Feast"
5. "Honeydew" (featuring Fi)
6. "Cheeky"
7. "So Long"
8. "Chipmunk"
9. "Do You Hear"
10. "Shanty Town"
11. "JusJus" (featuring Roots Manuva)
12. "Blackpool Roll"
13. "Travelogue"
14. "Fish"

CD2

1. "Vibraphone Boogie"
2. "Eardrops"
3. "Trollmarch"
4. "Sky Blue"
5. "Snack"
6. "Baisis"
7. "Happy Band" (originally on the 'Fish/Chipmunk' E.P.)
8. "Ambiosound" (originally on the B side of the 1st issue of the 'Get A Move On' 12")
9. "JusJus Instrumental"

tracks 1–6 & 9 are previously unissued

== Certifications ==
Certifications of Keep It Unreal
Region	Certification	Certified units/sales
United Kingdom (BPI)	Gold	100,000^{^}
^{^} Shipments figures based on certification alone.
