= Touch Pets: Dogs =

2010 video game

- Developer: Ngmoco
- Publisher: Rod Kiewiet
- Platform: iOS
- Genre: Simulation game
- Mode: Multiplayer

Touch Pets: Dogs was a game for Apple's iPhone. It was a social, virtual reality game where players could create their own pet dogs and take care of them like real pets. In 2013, Ngmoco shut down the servers for Touch Pets Dogs and the game was removed from the App Store, along with other Plus+ games.
