= Ngmoco =

American video game company

Ngmoco, LLC
- Type: Subsidiary
- Industry: Video games
- Founded: July 2008
- Founder: Joe Keene; Bob Stevenson; Neil Young; Alan Yu
- Defunct: October 18, 2016
- Headquarters: San Francisco, California, United States
- Area served: International
- Key people: Neil Young (CEO)
- Products: Rolando; Rolando 2 Eliminate Pro
- Number of employees: 26 (2009)
- Parent: DeNA Co., Ltd. (2010-2016)
- Website: www.ngmoco.com

Ngmoco, LLC (stylized as ngmoco:)) was an American-based publisher of video games for the iOS and Android platforms, and a subsidiary of DeNA Co., Ltd. The company was founded by former Electronic Arts executive Neil Young in July 2008. By March 2009, ngmoco's games on the App Store had received over seven million installations. Venture capital firms Kleiner Perkins Caufield & Byers and Norwest Venture Partners, among others, financed the company with a combined total of US$40.6 million. The company is most well known for their publishing of the Rolando game series and Eliminate Pro.

== History ==
In June 2008, Electronic Arts Games label president Frank Gibeau announced to the media that executive Neil Young was leaving the company to form a company of his own. Young had managed Maxis, EA Los Angeles, and EA's Blueprint division. The next week, Young announced that the company, co-founded by Bob Stevenson, Alan Yu and Joe Keene, would be named "ngmoco" (short for "Next Generation Mobile Company"), and would focus on game publishing for the iPhone platform. It was also announced that the company had achieved funding from venture capitalist firm Kleiner Perkins Caufield & Byers (as part of the iFund), and that partner and former Chief Creative Officer of EA Bing Gordon had joined ngmoco's board of directors.

In October 2008, the company released their first three games. They consisted of Topple, MazeFinger, and Rolando. The company's board was joined by Tim Chang, whose investment firm Norwest Venture Partners invested $10,000,000 in ngmoco's second round of funding.

On 15 June 15 2009, ngmoco launched a social networking, game discovery and multiplayer platform called the "Plus+ Network", combined with a third-party channel for independent developers. The "Plus+ Publishing group" was headed up by former Sega of America and LucasArts executive Simon Jeffery.

On November 4, 2009, ngmoco announced it had acquired iPhone and Facebook developer, Miraphonic, whose games included Epic Pet Wars and Epic Soldier Wars.

In February 2010, investors Institutional Venture Partners, and existing shareholders Kleiner Perkins, Norwest Venture Partners, and Maples Investments led another fund-raising campaign in a series C venture round to raise an additional $25,000,000. Soon thereafter, ngmoco acquired long-time Mac OS and iOS developer Freeverse as well as Stumptown Game Machine.

On October 12, 2010, Japan-based DeNA announced its decision to acquire ngmoco for $400,000,000. After this, ngmoco LLC became the regional headquarters for all Western subsidiaries of DeNA, including studios in Vancouver, Santiago de Chile, Stockholm and Amsterdam.

On October 18, 2016, DeNA Co., Ltd. announced the closure of all Western subsidiaries, shortly after announcing a new strategy for the West in collaboration with Nintendo.

== Games ==
The following is a list of games that were published under the ngmoco name:

- Dr. Awesome (2008)
- MazeFinger (2008)
- Rolando (2008)
- Topple (2008)
- Dropship (2009)
- Eliminate Pro (2009)
- Rolando 2: Quest for the Golden Orchid (2009)
- Star Defense (2009)
- Topple 2 (2009)
- Touch Pets: Dogs (2009)
- Word-Fu (2009)
- Adventure Bay (2010)
- Charadium (2010)
- Eliminate Burst (2010)
- Eliminate: Gun Range (2010)
- GodFinger (2010)
- Star Wars: Imperial Academy (2010)
- Touch Pets: Cats (2010)
- Touch Pets: Dogs 2 (2010)
- We City (2010)
- We Doodle (2010)
- We Farm (2010)
- We Rule (2010)
- Fantastic Fish (2011)
- Dreamtopia (2012)
- Skyfall (2013)
