= Ninja Tuna =

Studio album by Mr. Scruff
- Released: 6 October 2008
- Genres: Electronica, trip hop
- Length: 66:53
- Label: Ninja Tune
- Producer: Mr. Scruff

Mr. Scruff chronology
| Mr. Scruff (2005) | Ninja Tuna (2008) | Bonus Bait (2009) |

Singles from Ninja Tuna
- 1. "Test the Sound" Released: July 1, 2002; 2. "Kalimba" Released: June 30, 2005; 3. "Whiplash" Released: 2006; 4. "This Way" Released: 2009

Professional ratings
Review scores
| Source | Rating |
|---|---|
| The A.V. Club | B− |
| Gigwise | 4/5 stars |

Ninja Tuna is the fourth studio album by British record producer Andrew "Mr. Scruff" Carthy, released on 6 October 2008 through Carthy's personal Ninja Tune imprint Ninja Tuna.

A compilation of outtakes from the album, entitled Bonus Bait, was released the following year.

In 2009, it was awarded a silver certification (indicating sales of at least 30,000 copies throughout Europe) from the Independent Music Companies Association.

== Track listing ==
All tracks are written by Mr. Scruff.

| No. | Title | Length |
|---|---|---|
| 1. | "Test the Sound" | 1:40 |
| 2. | "Music Takes Me Up" (featuring Alice Russell) | 5:27 |
| 3. | "Donkey Ride" (featuring Quantic) | 5:12 |
| 4. | "Hairy Bumpercress" | 6:30 |
| 5. | "Whiplash" | 5:59 |
| 6. | "Nice Up the Function" (featuring Roots Manuva) | 3:54 |
| 7. | "Bang the Floor" (featuring Danny Breaks) | 3:41 |
| 8. | "Get on Down" | 5:53 |
| 9. | "Hold On" (featuring Andreya Triana) | 5:03 |
| 10. | "Give Up to Get" | 6:44 |
| 11. | "Kalimba" | 5:50 |
| 12. | "This Way" (featuring Pete Simpson) | 5:31 |
| 13. | "Stockport Carnival" | 5:29 |
| Total length: | | 66:53 |

== Personnel ==
- Mr. Scruff (Andrew Carthy) – all instruments, production
- Alice Russell – vocals (2)
- Quantic (Will Holland) – vocals (3)
- Roots Manuva (Rodney Hylton Smith) – vocals (6)
- Danny Breaks (Daniel Whidett) – vocals (7)
- Andreya Triana – vocals (9)
- Pete Simpson – vocals (12)
