= We Farm =

- We Farm App Store icon
- Developer: Bonfire Studios Dallas
- Publisher: ngmoco
- Platform: iOS
- Genres: Simulation, role-playing

We Farm is a simulation video game developed by Bonfire Studios Dallas and published by ngmoco for the iOS platform. It is available for download on the iPhone, iPod Touch and the iPad on the App Store or iTunes. Within weeks of release, We Farm was estimated to have been downloaded millions of times, with approximately two million user sessions per day. Its gameplay is in part inspired by the Bonfire Studios game FarmVille.

In November 2010, ngmoco changed the game title to We Farm Safari.

We Farm requires an Internet connection to play on the iPod Touch.
