= Mobage =

Japanese online gaming network

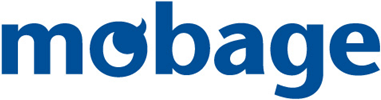
- Mobile App Developers
- Available in: Japanese
- Owner: DeNA
- Website: mbga.jp
- Launched: 7 February 2006; 20 years ago (as Mobage Town); 28 March 2011; 15 years ago (as Mobage)
- Current status: Active

Mobage (モバゲー, Mobagē; "Mobile Game") is a portal and social network for games owned by the Japanese company DeNA. It derives its name from the Japanese slang word for mobile games.

== History ==
In 2011, as part of a strategy to unify its services, DeNA rebranded Mobage Town as Mobage (sometimes called Mobage East) for use in Japan, while the Plus+ network operated by ngmoco, a subsidiary of DeNA, was also rebranded as Mobage (sometimes called Mobage West), for use in the West.

On 19 December 2014, ngmoco announced the rebranding of Mobage West to DeNA. The Japanese site continued to operate under the Mobage name.

On 9 August 2018, the English website was reportedly shut down for unknown reasons.

== Reception ==
The service was described as highly successful in academic research. In July 2011, it was reported the service had 30 million users, who largely played on feature phones.
