= Topple =

2008 video game

- App icon
- Developer: Chris DeLeon
- Publisher: ngmoco
- Platform: iOS
- Release: October 17, 2008
- Genre: Action

Topple is a game by American developer Chris DeLeon and published by ngmoco for the iOS platform. It is available for download on the iPhone and iPod Touch on the App Store or iTunes. A sequel entitled Topple 2 was released on March 8, 2009.

== Gameplay ==
In Topple players have to complete levels by stacking differently shaped blocks vertically to reach a set height. Players can use their finger to stack blocks by dragging them. Players can also rotate blocks by placing 2 fingers on the screen and rotating, while dragging a block. The tower can be kept upright by tilting the device in the opposite direction from the direction the tower is leaning in. Players lose a level when 4 blocks fall off the side of the screen. There are 9 levels to complete and players are rewarded stars for reaching the bonus height, time and target score. There is also an expert mode, training, free play and space mode. There is also an option to challenge friends via email and also in game achievements.

== Reception ==
=== Topple 2 ===
PocketGamer gave the game 7/10, writing "A renovation that brings inventive new challenges and features, while preserving the tough gameplay foundation of the original". SlideToPlay gave it 3 out of 4, writing "Topple 2 brings enough new stuff to the table to be worth the buy." 148Apps gave it 4.5 stars, commenting "There's not much to complain about with Topple 2. Ngmoco:) should be commended for taking such a simple premise and enhancing it in unexpected ways to enrich the experience. I'm not sure how often I will come back to the game after completing the first run (I'm not much of an achievement nut), but the multiplayer addition should make it a worthwhile addiction to return to for a quick game with friends. If you liked the original, you should buy Topple 2 without hesitation".

TouchArcade wrote "If you appreciated Topple, picking up Topple 2 at $2.99 is a no-brainer. The sharp difficulty curve and multiple game modes should keep fans of the original busy for quite a while. A basic achievements system, combined with being awarded stars for completing levels and beating various score thresholds, should provide a decent amount of replay value. If you're new to the series, pick up the first one for free [App Store] before making the plunge to Topple 2. As stated previously, if you can't make it through the few levels which make up the original, you're not going to make it very far in the sequel."
