= Mr. Scruff (album) =

Studio album by Mr. Scruff
- Released: May 12, 1997 (Pleasure Music); May 22, 2005 (Mrs. Cruff remaster)
- Recorded: 1995–1997
- Genre: Electronic, downtempo, breakbeat, jazzstep, trip hop, nu jazz
- Length: 61:28
- Label: Pleasure Music (1997); Ninja Tune (2005)

Mr. Scruff chronology
Mr. Scruff (1997)	Keep It Unreal (1999)

Professional ratings
Review scores
Source	Rating
AllMusic	3/5 stars

Mr. Scruff is the debut studio album by Mr. Scruff. It was released via Pleasure Music on May 12, 1997.

The album saw the emergence of one of Scruff's obsessions – sea-life. The opening track, "Sea Mammal", was the first of several to use cut-up recordings of voice-overs from children's stories and nature documentaries to create surreal and silly stories. The track is a tribute to Boogie Down Productions' track "My Philosophy", and was originally released as the B-side to Scruff's debut release, the single "Hocus Pocus" (1995). The album also contains another track that references sea creatures – the album's closer, "Wail" (being a homophone for "whale").

In 2005 the album was remastered and re-released via Ninja Tune under the name Mrs. Cruff, containing three additional tracks.

== Track listing ==
All music is composed by Andrew Carthy.

Original release
No.	Title	Length
1.	"Sea Mammal"	8:20
2.	"Bass Baby"	5:57
3.	"Limbic Funk"	5:29
4.	"Chicken in a Box"	8:26
5.	"Jazz Potato"	6:07
6.	"Bonce"	4:59
7.	"Night Time"	6:00
8.	"After Time"	2:32
9.	"Crisps"	6:27

All music is composed by Andrew Carthy.

Mrs. Cruff re-release
No.	Title	Length
1.	"Sea Mammal"	8:20
2.	"Tubby Mechanical Friend"	6:01
3.	"Bass Baby"	5:57
4.	"Bonce"	4:59
5.	"Chicken in a Box"	8:26
6.	"Night Time"	6:00
7.	"After Time"	2:32
8.	"Limbic Funk"	5:29
9.	"Bobby's Jazz Pony"	5:03
10.	"Jazz Potato"	6:07
11.	"Crisps"	6:27
12.	"Wail"	3:46

== Trivia ==
The song "Limbic Funk" samples audio from The Hitchhiker's Guide to the Galaxy.
