= Broke 'n' English =

English hip-hop rap group

Broke ‘n’ English
- Origin: Manchester, United Kingdom
- Genres: Hip-hop, Grime
- Occupation: Rappers
- Years active: 2004-present
- Members: Strategy

Broke ‘n’ English is an English hip-hop rap group from Manchester.

Konny Kon was originally part of the rap group Children of Zeus. Both bands were part of a local movement of Manchester musicians.

== History ==
Konny Kon was part of the group Children of Zeus and formed Broke ‘n’ English in 2004. They released their first mixtape, Terms and Conditions.

They performed with M.I.A. in 2007. Eventually, they did a concert in 2010.

Strategy, a member of the group also goes on his own to make music. He released “Carbon Footprint”. This song was featured in the 2022 racing video game Need for Speed: Unbound.

== Discography ==
Albums

- Terms and Conditions (2005)
- Subject 2 Status (2007)
