= Seabeard =

2014 mobile video game

- Developer: Hand Circus
- Publisher: Backflip Studios
- Platforms: iOS, Android
- Release: NA: December 10, 2014
- Genres: Adventure, Simulation, Roleplaying

Seabeard is an adventure video game developed by Hand Circus and released on December 10, 2014, by Backflip Studios for iOS and Android.

== Gameplay ==
The player is the grandchild and the only descendant of the great explorer, Seabeard. Seabeard united all the rival tribes by forming a great city- Accordia. Then an ancient monster named Colosso rose from the depths of the sea and destroyed everything Seabeard built. That was the last time that Seabeard was seen and Accordia was left in ruins. The player now must restore Accordia to its former glory and reunite the people of this great land.

== Development ==
Seabeard was released for iOS on December 10, 2014, and was later released for Android on March 13, 2015.

== Reception ==
Reception

Aggregate score
Aggregator	Score
Metacritic	68/100

Review score
Publication	Score
TouchArcade	4/5

Gamezebo rated Seabeard 3/5. The game was compared to Animal Crossing.

== General references ==
- Theguardian.com
- Gamezebo.com
- Ign.com
- Siliconera.com
- Pocketgamer.co.uk
