= Nihon Kotsu =

Japanese taxi and limousine company

Nihon Kotsu Co., Ltd. (日本交通株式会社) is one of the largest taxi and limousine operators in Japan, with a fleet of approximately 4,000 vehicles and 2,700 affiliated vehicles. It is one of the four principal taxi companies in Tokyo, along with Daiwa, Teito and Kokusai. Its headquarters is in the Kioicho district of Chiyoda City.

Nihon Kotsu also operates in other Japanese cities through affiliates, including the Tokyo satellite cities of Yokohama, Saitama, Maebashi, and Odawara, and the core Kansai region cities of Osaka, Kyoto and Kobe.

The CEO of Nihon Kotsu, Ichiro Kawanabe, is known in Tokyo media as the "Prince of Taxis" or the "Taxi Prince".

== History ==
The company was founded as a sole proprietorship in 1928 and reorganized as a stock company in December 1945. It began as a limousine operator and expanded to taxi service in 1940.

NK operates the most popular taxi hailing mobile application in Japan: Japan Taxi. Toyota invested 500 million yen in the app in 2017, followed by a second ¥7.5 billion investment in 2018. Tokyo Musen, a major rival of Nihon Kotsu in the Tokyo area, joined the app later that year in an effort to counterbalance foreign rivals such as Uber and Didi Chuxing. The app covered approximately one in four Japanese taxis as of 2018. Nihon Kotsu also participated in a government trial of taxi sharing in early 2018.

NK was the first major customer for the JPN Taxi, a new Japanese taxi design based on the black cabs of London, which began production in 2017.

In 2018, NK began selling multilingual payment terminals to other taxi operators in Japan.
