= We Rule =

2010 video game

- We Rule icon on the iOS App Store
- Developer: Newtoy, Inc.
- Publisher: Ngmoco
- Platforms: Android, iOS
- Release: iOS: March 20, 2010 iPad: April 1, 2010
- Genres: Simulation, RPG

We Rule was a free-to-play mobile game developed by Newtoy and published by ngmoco for iOS and later on Android. It was available for download on the iPhone, iPod Touch and the iPad on the App Store or iTunes, and attracted many users since its release in March 2010. Although a free app, customers were able to buy in-app purchases; as of April 2010, it was the highest-grossing free-to-download game for the iOS. Within weeks of release, We Rule was estimated to have been downloaded millions of times, with approximately two million user sessions per day. Its gameplay was in part inspired by the Zynga game FarmVille.

On February 1, 2013, We Rule was removed from the Appstore alongside other ngmoco games. The app continued to receive support until March 31, 2013 when its service ended and We Rule became unplayable. Unlike some ngmoco games which continued to function after support ended, We Rule no longer functions.

== Gameplay ==
In We Rule, players rule and have complete control over their Kingdom. Players begin with a tutorial, which eventually ends when the player has completed certain objectives. When beginning, players mainly profit from farming. Later in the game (but still in the tutorial) players can build houses and shops. Shops serve as the reason for needing a Plus+ account to play (any player can sign up right away after downloading We Rule). When one player has a shop that has already been constructed and opened, another player (who must be friends on We Rule with that person) can make an order for some items from their shop. Houses have a smaller impact on the game. When purchasing a house, players have to pay 100 Coins for each house, and can then collect taxes from each house every five minutes. The tax collected is ten Coins.

Coins and Mojo play a very critical part in the game. Coins are the money used in We Rule, while Mojo can be used to instantly complete in-game tasks (growing crops, finishing building construction, and making a friend's order ready). Players can purchase Mojo using real money for various prices and quantities. Mojo can also be obtained as players level up, which is done by earning XP (experience points) by collecting crops and coins, completing objectives, and placing buildings. Players can decorate their Kingdom with many trees and other accessories. Besides shops, many other interesting buildings are available.

== Updates ==
With an early 2010 content update, We Rule's level system allowed players to reach level 30 from the former 25. With this update the game's creators disabled power-leveling items such as Magic Cauliflower and Asparagus, but added several rewards: the Ruby Citadel (available at level 30), Ruby Groves (level 26), Stocks (level 15) and Prison (level 15). A subsequent update shortly after the expansion to 30 levels reinstated Magic Cauliflower and Asparagus.

On June 19, 2010, Ngmoco released a podcast discussing a new update which would allow the player to have several plots of land, known as realms, each gained or purchased at levels 15, 20, 25, and 30, as well as bug fixes. On June 26, Apple finalized the update, which was released it as We Rule 1.1.

Around September 2010, Ngmoco announced that We Rule would also be available on Android.

On October 26, 2010, Apple finalized another major update. We Rule became We Rule: Quests, which enables players to take up optional quests that yield various rewards. These quests require the player to make use of their Plus+ friends and order specific items from them, thus completing the quest once the other party has completed the order and sent it. Quest rewards come in the form of Experience points, Coins, or special decorations, which you can only obtain through completing quests.

Within the same time span of the We Rule: Quests update, the maximum level players can achieve increased to 45 from the previous 40. Along with the new level cap, new crops were also introduced.

As of August 2011, We Rule was updated weekly by Ngmoco. Players could achieve up to level 65, and special items, including "magic farms" and a gift system, were added. We Rule: Quests was later abandoned, and was replaced by the Goals system in the We Rule Deluxe version of the game.

As of September 2012, We Rule ceased regular updates. The highest level achievable was 80.

We Rule support ended completely on March 31, 2013. Players could not access their kingdom or play after that date.

== Criticism ==
The We Rule interface.

In We Rule, many players complain about slow loading time and problems involving connections and servers. In late March, We Rule had major server trouble, affecting a lot of players. ngmoco apologized for this trouble, by giving every player ten free Mojo. In June 2010 for half a week, when players tried to log in they received an error message noting that "plus+ is experiencing heavy load. Please try again later." This time players were given 5 free Mojo, as their crops and orders were spoiled by the time they could log back into "We Rule".
