= Trouser Jazz =

Studio album by Mr. Scruff
- Released: 16 September 2002
- Recorded: 2001–2002
- Genres: Downtempo, trip hop, electronica
- Length: 62:49
- Labels: Ninja Tune; ZENCD065

Mr. Scruff chronology
Heavyweight Rib Ticklers (2002)	Trouser Jazz (2002)	Keep It Solid Steel Volume 1 (2004)

Singles from Trouser Jazz
- 1. "Shrimp!" Released: May 27, 2002; 2. "Beyond / Champion Nibble" Released: September 16, 2002; 3. "Sweetsmoke" Released: December 2, 2002; 4. "Giffin" Released: October 20, 2003

Professional ratings
Review scores
Source	Rating
Allmusic	3/5 stars
The Guardian	2/5 stars
Pitchfork Media	(7.0/10)

Trouser Jazz is the third studio album by English disc jockey Andrew Carthy, under the alias, Mr. Scruff. It was released on 16 September 2002 on Ninja Tune. In 2010 it was awarded a gold certification from the Independent Music Companies Association, which indicated sales of at least 100,000 copies throughout Europe.

== Track listing ==
=== CD ===
1. "Here We Go" – 1:11
2. "Sweet Smoke" – 6:36
3. "Beyond" (featuring Seaming To) – 3:48
4. "Shrimp" (featuring Sneaky of Fingathing) – 7:01
5. "Come Alive" (featuring Niko) – 5:15
6. "Shelf Wobbler" – 6:31
7. "Giffin" – 5:56
8. "Valley of the Sausages" (featuring Moss, Sneaky & Seaming To) – 5:00
9. "Champion Nibble" – 3:34
10. "Come On Grandad" – 5:47
11. "Vibrate" (featuring Braintax) – 3:09
12. "Ug" – 4:37
13. "Ahoy There!" (featuring Albert Ross) [not on digital] – 4:24

=== LP ===
==== Side one ====
1. "Here We Go"
2. "Shelf Wobbler"

==== Side two ====
1. "Sweet Smoke"
2. "Champion Nibble"

==== Side three ====
1. "Shrimp"
2. "Beyond"

==== Side four ====
1. "Valley of the Sausages"
2. "Come On Grandad"

==== Side five ====
1. "Giffin"
2. "Come Alive"

==== Side six ====
1. "Vibrate"
2. "Ug"
3. "Ahoy There!"

== Certifications ==
Certifications of Trouser Jazz
Region	Certification	Certified units/sales
United Kingdom (BPI)	Silver	60,000^{^}
^{^} Shipments figures based on certification alone.
