= Danny Breaks =

British drum and bass DJ, record producer and record label owner

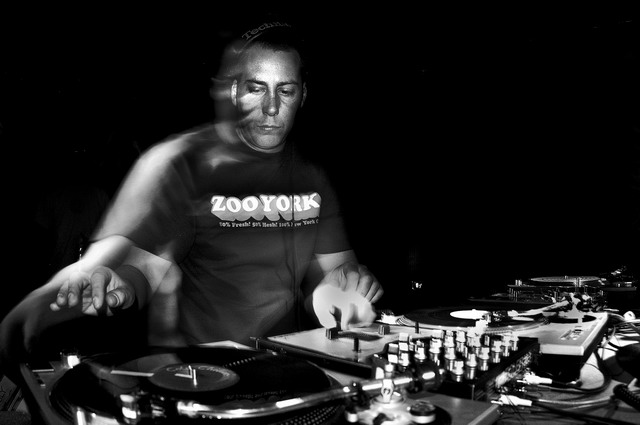
- Danny Breaks performing in 2005

Background information
- Also known as: Sonz of a Loop Da Loop Era
- Born: Daniel Whiddett
- Website: www.droppin-science.co.uk

Danny Breaks (born Daniel Whiddett) is a British drum and bass DJ, record producer and record label owner. He is known for his experimental instrumental hip hop production, and early music career as the breakbeat hardcore artist Sonz of a Loop Da Loop Era.

Whiddett began recording under the alias Sonz of a Loop Da Loop Era during the early 1990s, for the record label Suburban Base, notably attaining a top 40 hit on the UK Singles Chart with "Far Out" in 1991. In his book Drum 'n' Bass: The Rough Guide, writer Peter Shapiro wrote that the track "heard the sounds of '80s New York with a day-glo intensity and the track was all hot flashes and giddy energy that managed to dent the UK Top 40", also describing it as "one of the most exciting visions of an alternate hip-hop ever conceived."

Sons of a Loop Da Loop Era's album Flowers in My Garden LP (1993) was ranked at number 37 in Freaky Trigger founder Tom Ewing's list of the 100 best albums of the 1990s.

In 1994, he established the imprint Droppin' Science and began releasing as Danny Breaks, moving with the evolution of hardcore into jungle, and then into contemporary drum and bass. The label has been inactive since 2002, with Whiddett preferring to release increasingly experimental material on new label Alphabet Zoo.

He has also released records with True Playaz and Moving Shadow, and has additionally recorded under the names D. Whiddett, Droppin' Science and Safari Sounds.

After living in Eastwood, Essex, where he was raised, he relocated to Cologne, Germany, in 2015.
