= Barry White discography =

Catalog of published recordings by Barry White

This is the discography documenting albums and singles released by American R&B/soul singer Barry White. On the Billboard Hot 100, White scored a number one hit in 1974 with "Can't Get Enough of Your Love, Babe." Five of his other singles also reached the top ten. "Can't Get Enough" also became a number one album for White. In all, six of White's albums were certified platinum by the Recording Industry Association of America. Six others were certified gold.

== Albums ==
=== Studio albums ===
Year	Album	Peak chart positions								Certifications	Record label
Year	Album	US	US R&B	AUS	CAN	FRA	NLD	NZ	UK	Certifications	Record label
1973	I've Got So Much to Give	16	1	39	64	—	—	—	—	RIAA: Gold	20th Century
1973	Stone Gon'	20	1	9	28	—	—	—	18	RIAA: Gold; BPI: Gold	20th Century
1974	Can't Get Enough	1	1	28	2	—	2	—	4	RIAA: Gold; BPI: Gold	20th Century
1975	Just Another Way to Say I Love You	17	1	54	44	1	—	—	12	RIAA: Gold; BPI: Silver	20th Century
1976	Let the Music Play	42	8	75	—	—	—	—	22	BPI: Silver	20th Century
1976	Is This Whatcha Wont?	125	25	—	—	—	—	—	—	BPI: Silver	20th Century
1977	Barry White Sings for Someone You Love	8	1	—	5	13	—	—	—	RIAA: Platinum	20th Century
1978	The Man	36	1	97	30	23	—	—	46	RIAA: Platinum	20th Century
1979	I Love to Sing the Songs I Sing	132	40	—	—	—	—	—	—		20th Century
1979	The Message Is Love	67	14	—	—	—	—	—	—	RIAA: Gold	Unlimited Gold
1980	Sheet Music	85	19	—	—	—	—	—	—		Unlimited Gold
1981	Barry & Glodean (with Glodean White)	—	—	—	—	—	—	—	—		Unlimited Gold
1981	Beware!	—	40	—	—	—	—	—	—		Unlimited Gold
1982	Change	148	19	—	—	—	—	—	—		Unlimited Gold
1983	Dedicated	—	—	—	—	—	—	—	—		Unlimited Gold
1987	The Right Night & Barry White	159	28	—	—	—	—	45	74		A&M
1989	The Man Is Back!	143	22	—	—	—	—	—	—		A&M
1991	Put Me in Your Mix	96	8	—	—	—	—	—	—		A&M
1994	The Icon Is Love	20	1	190	29	—	40	—	44	RIAA: 2× Platinum; MC: Gold	A&M
1999	Staying Power	43	13	151	—	65	—	—	—	RIAA: Gold	Private Music
"—" denotes a recording that did not chart or was not released in that territory.

=== Compilation albums ===
Year	Album	Peak chart positions								Certifications	Record label
Year	Album	US	US R&B	AUS	CAN	FRA	NLD	NZ	UK	Certifications	Record label
1974	No Limit on Love	—	—	—	—	—	—	—	—		Supremacy
1975	Barry White's Greatest Hits	23	15	169	—	—	—	13	18	RIAA: Platinum; BPI: Gold; MC: Gold	20th Century
1977	Barry White's Greatest Hits Vol. 2	—	—	—	—	—	—	—	17		20th Century
1985	Heart and Soul	—	—	—	—	—	—	—	34	BPI: Silver	K-tel
1987	Satin & Soul - 24 of his Greatest Hits	—	—	—	—	—	—	—	—		Connoisseur Collection
1988	The Collection	—	—	91	—	—	14	—	5	BPI: 5× Platinum	Mercury
1992	Just for You	—	—	—	—	—	—	—	—		Mercury
1993	Soul Seduction	—	—	—	—	—	—	—	—	BPI: Gold	Spectrum Music
1994	All-Time Greatest Hits	—	70	156	—	—	—	2	—	RIAA: 2× Platinum; BPI: Gold; RMNZ: 2× Platinum	Mercury
2000	The Ultimate Collection	148	98	5	—	32	18	6	—	RIAA: Platinum; ARIA: Platinum; MC: Gold; NVPI: Gold; RMNZ: 2× Platinum	UTV
2002	The Heart & Soul of Barry White	—	—	—	—	—	—	—	—	BPI: Gold	Hallmark
2003	Love Songs	—	—	—	—	—	—	—	21	BPI: Gold	UMTV
2003	20th Century Masters – The Millennium Collection: The Best of Barry White	78	54	—	—	—	—	—	—		Island
2005	Gold: The Very Best of Barry White	—	—	—	—	—	—	—	37	BPI: Silver	UMTV
2006	Gold	—	—	—	—	—	—	—	—		Hip-O
2009	Number Ones	—	—	—	—	—	—	—	—		Hip-O
2009	Unlimited	—	—	—	—	—	—	—	—		Hip-O
2010	Icon	—	50	—	—	—	—	—	—		Mercury
2010	Icon 2	—	—	—	—	—	—	—	—		Hip-O
"—" denotes a recording that did not chart or was not released in that territory.

== Singles ==
Year	Title	Peak chart positions											Certifications	Album
Year	Title	US	US R&B	US A/C	US Dan	AUS	CAN	FRA	IRE	NLD	NZ	UK	Certifications	Album
1963	"Strange World"^{[A]}	—	—	—	—	—	—	—	—	—	—	—		—N/a
1963	"Angel of Love"^{[A]}	—	—	—	—	—	—	—	—	—	—	—		—N/a
1963	"Tracy (All I Have Is You)"^{[B]}	—	—	—	—	—	—	—	—	—	—	—		—N/a
1965	"Forty Acres"^{[C]}	—	—	—	—	—	—	—	—	—	—	—		—N/a
1966	"Man Ain't Nothin'"^{[C]}	—	—	—	—	—	—	—	—	—	—	—		—N/a
1967	"All in the Run of a Day"	—	—	—	—	—	—	—	—	—	—	—		—N/a
1970	"In the Ghetto"^{[D]}	—	—	—	—	—	—	—	—	—	—	—		—N/a
1973	"I'm Gonna Love You Just a Little More Baby"	3	1	27	—	26	10	37	—	14	—	23	RIAA: Gold	I've Got So Much to Give
1973	"I've Got So Much to Give"	32	5	46	—	—	—	—	—	—	—	—		I've Got So Much to Give
1973	"Never, Never Gonna Give Ya Up"	7	2	40	—	8	65	36	—	9	—	14	RIAA: Gold	Stone Gon'
1974	"Honey Please, Can't Ya See"	44	6	—	—	—	22	—	—	—	—	53		Stone Gon'
1974	"Can't Get Enough of Your Love, Babe"	1	1	26	—	23	5	—	17	12	10	8	RIAA: Gold; BPI: Silver	Can't Get Enough
1974	"You're the First, the Last, My Everything"	2	1	—	2	60	7	7	6	13	12	1	RIAA: Gold; BPI: Platinum	Can't Get Enough
1975	"What Am I Gonna Do with You"	8	1	—	—	—	23	—	—	19	6	5		Just Another Way to Say I Love You
1975	"I'll Do for You Anything You Want Me To"	40	4	—	—	—	50	—	—	—	—	20		Just Another Way to Say I Love You
1975	"Let the Music Play"	32	4	—	15	87	58	19	16	23	—	9		Let the Music Play
1976	"You See the Trouble with Me"	—	14	—	15	—	—	—	15	19	—	2	BPI: Silver	Let the Music Play
1976	"Baby, We Better Try to Get It Together"	92	29	—	—	—	—	—	—	—	—	15		Let the Music Play
1976	"Don't Make Me Wait Too Long"	105	20	—	—	—	—	36	—	—	—	17		Is This Whatcha Wont?
1977	"I'm Qualified to Satisfy You"	—	25	—	30	—	—	—	—	—	—	37		Is This Whatcha Wont?
1977	"It's Ecstasy When You Lay Down Next to Me"	4	1	—	5	—	11	59	—	—	—	40	RIAA: Gold	Barry White Sings for Someone You Love
1977	"Playing Your Game, Baby"	101	8	—	—	—	95	—	—	—	—	—		Barry White Sings for Someone You Love
1978	"Oh What a Night for Dancing"	24	13	—	—	—	31	—	—	—	—	—		Barry White Sings for Someone You Love
1978	"Your Sweetness Is My Weakness"	60	2	—	16	—	58	—	—	—	—	—		The Man
1978	"Just the Way You Are"	102	45	—	—	—	—	—	15	—	—	12	BPI: Silver	The Man
1979	"Sha La La Means I Love You"	—	—	—	—	—	—	—	—	—	—	55		The Man
1979	"I Love to Sing the Songs I Sing"	—	53	—	—	—	—	—	—	—	—	—		I Love to Sing the Songs I Sing
1979	"How Did You Know It Was Me?"	—	64	—	—	—	—	—	—	—	—	—	—	I Love to Sing the Songs I Sing
1979	"Any Fool Could See (You Were Meant for Me)"	—	37	—	—	—	—	—	—	—	—	—		The Message Is Love
1979	"It Ain't Love, Babe (Until You Give It)"	—	58	—	—	—	—	—	—	—	—	—		The Message Is Love
1980	"Love Ain't Easy"	—	75	—	—	—	—	—	—	—	—	—		The Message Is Love
1980	"Sheet Music"	—	43	—	—	—	—	—	—	—	—	—		Sheet Music
1980	"Love Makin' Music"	—	25	—	—	—	—	—	—	—	—	—		Sheet Music
1980	"I Believe in Love"	—	71	—	—	—	—	—	—	—	—	—		Sheet Music
1981	"Didn't We Make It Happen, Baby" (with Glodean White)	—	78	—	—	—	—	—	—	—	—	—		Barry & Glodean
1981	"I Want You" (with Glodean White)	—	79	—	—	—	—	—	—	—	—	—		Barry & Glodean
1981	"You're the Only One for Me" (with Glodean White)	—	—	—	—	—	—	—	—	—	—	—		Barry & Glodean
1981	"Louie Louie"	—	—	—	—	—	—	—	—	—	—	—		Beware
1981	"Beware"	—	49	—	—	—	—	—	—	—	—	—		Beware
1982	"Change"	—	12	—	—	—	—	—	—	—	—	—		Change
1982	"Passion"	—	65	—	—	—	—	—	—	—	—	—		Change
1983	"America"	—	—	—	—	—	—	—	—	—	—	—		Dedicated
1984	"Don't Let Them Blow Your Mind"	—	—	—	—	—	—	—	—	—	—	—		Dedicated
1987	"Sho' You Right"	—	17	—	—	—	—	18	27	—	41	14		The Right Night & Barry White
1987	"For Your Love (I'll Do Most Anything)"	—	27	—	—	—	—	—	—	—	—	94		The Right Night & Barry White
1988	"Never, Never Gonna Give You Up" (Paul Hardcastle Remix)	—	—	—	—	—	—	—	—	—	—	63		The Collection
1989	"Super Lover"	—	34	—	—	—	—	—	—	—	—	—		The Man Is Back!
1989	"Follow That and See (Where It Leads Y'All)"	—	—	—	—	—	—	—	—	—	—	—		The Man Is Back!
1990	"I Wanna Do It Good to Ya"	—	26	—	—	—	—	—	—	—	—	—		The Man Is Back!
1990	"When Will I See You Again"	—	32	—	—	—	—	—	—	—	—	—		The Man Is Back!
1991	"Put Me in Your Mix"	—	2	—	—	—	—	—	—	—	—	76		Put Me In Your Mix
1992	"Dark and Lovely (You Over There)" (with Isaac Hayes)	—	29	—	—	—	—	—	—	—	—	—		Put Me In Your Mix
1994	"Practice What You Preach"	18	1	—	—	—	31	—	—	36	—	20	RIAA: Gold	The Icon Is Love
1995	"Love Is the Icon"	—	—	—	—	—	—	—	—	—	—	20		The Icon Is Love
1995	"Come On"	87	12	—	—	—	88	—	—	—	—	—		The Icon Is Love
1995	"I Only Want to Be with You"	—	—	—	—	—	—	—	—	—	—	36		The Icon Is Love
1995	"There It Is"	—	54	—	—	—	—	—	—	—	—	—		The Icon Is Love
1999	"Staying Power"	—	45	—	—	—	—	—	—	—	—	—		Staying Power
1999	"The Longer We Make Love" (with Lisa Stansfield & Chaka Khan)	—	—	—	—	—	—	—	—	—	—	—		Staying Power
2000	"Let the Music Play" (Funkstar De Luxe Remixes)	—	—	—	—	105	—	39	—	91	—	45		—N/a
"—" denotes a recording that did not chart or was not released in that territory.

- ^{A} Singles credited to Barry White with the Majestics
- ^{B} Single credited to Barry White with the Atlantics
- ^{C} Single credited to Lee Barry
- ^{D} Single credited to Gene West

=== As featured performer ===
Year	Title	Artist	Peak chart positions							Album
Year	Title	Artist	US	US R&B	US A/C	US Dan	NLD	NZ	UK	Album
1990	"The Secret Garden (Sweet Seduction Suite)"	Quincy Jones w/ Al B. Sure! James Ingram; El DeBarge	31	1	26	—	13	—	67	Back on the Block
1991	"All of Me"	Big Daddy Kane	—	14	—	—	—	—	—	Taste of Chocolate
1996	"Slow Jams"	Quincy Jones w/ Babyface; Tamia; Portrait	68	19	—	—	—	2	—	Q's Jook Joint
1996	"In Your Wildest Dreams"	Tina Turner	101	34	—	38	77	22	32	Wildest Dreams
"—" denotes a recording that did not chart or was not released in that territory.

== Other appearances ==
Year	Song	Album
2011	"Can't Get Enough of Your Love, Babe" (live May 24, 1975)	The Best of Soul Train Live
