= The Collection (Barry White album) =

Greatest hits album by Barry White
- Released: 1988
- Genre: R&B; disco; soul
- Label: Mercury

Barry White chronology
The Right Night & Barry White (1987)	The Collection (1988)	The Man Is Back! (1989)

Professional ratings
Review scores
Source	Rating
AllMusic	3/5 stars

The Collection is a greatest hits album by American R&B singer Barry White, released in 1988.

== Commercial performance ==
Although The Collection reached its peak of number five in the UK Albums Chart shortly after its release in 1988, the album reappeared in the chart intermittently over the following years, including a lengthy run from 1999 to 2001 when the album, after its re-release in 1999, surged in sales again, this time reaching number six.

== Track listing ==
All tracks written by Barry White, except where noted.

1. "You're the First, the Last, My Everything" (White, Tony Sepe)
2. "You See the Trouble with Me"
3. "Can't Get Enough of Your Love, Babe"
4. "I'll Do for You Anything You Want Me To"
5. "Just the Way You Are" (Billy Joel)
6. "Walking in the Rain (With the One I Love)" (with Love Unlimited)
7. "It May Be Winter Outside (But in My Heart It's Spring)" (with Love Unlimited) (White, Paul Politi)
8. "Love's Theme" (with The Love Unlimited Orchestra)
9. "Sho' You Right" (White, Jack Perry)
10. "What Am I Gonna Do with You"
11. "Baby We Better Try and Get It Together"
12. "Let the Music Play"
13. "Don't Make Me Wait Too Long"
14. "I'm Gonna Love You Just a Little More Babe"
15. "The Right Night"
16. "Never Never Gonna Give You Up" (12" remix)

== Charts and certifications ==
=== Weekly charts ===
Chart performance for The Collection
Chart (1988)	Peak position
Dutch Albums Chart	14
UK Albums Chart	5
Chart (1991)	Peak position
Australian Albums (ARIA)	91

=== Certifications ===
Region	Certification	Certified units/sales
United Kingdom (BPI)	5× Platinum	1,500,000^{^}
^{^} Shipments figures based on certification alone.
