= Love Unlimited (disambiguation) =

Love Unlimited is an American female vocal trio.

Love Unlimited may also refer to:

- The Love Unlimited Orchestra, an American 40-piece string-laden orchestra
- Love Unlimited (Love Unlimited album), an album by the vocal trio
- Love Unlimited (Dreams Come True album)
- "Love Unlimited" (song), the Bulgarian entry for Eurovision 2012, sung by Sofi Marinova
- "Love Unlimited", a track from the 1998 Fun Lovin' Criminals album 100% Colombian
