= Rahn Coleman =

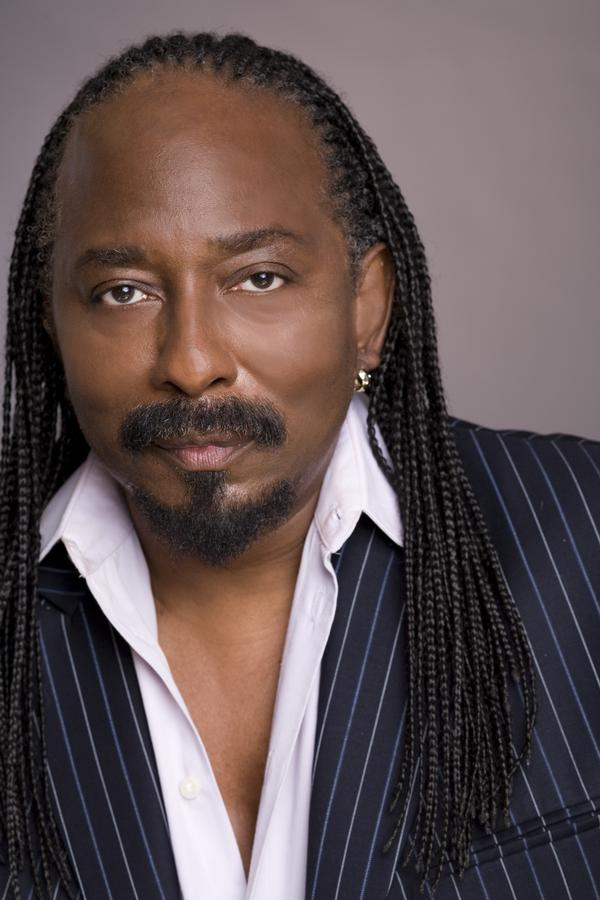
- Rahn Coleman

Background information
- Born: Ronald Edward Coleman; April 5, 1949 (age 77); San Francisco, California, United States
- Origin: Oakland, California, United States
- Genres: R&B, classical, musical theater, jazz
- Occupations: Record producer, composer, arranger, pianist, musical director, performance coach, orchestrator
- Instruments: Piano, keyboards, vocals, pipe organ, clarinet, oboe, violin, English horn
- Years active: 1971-present
- Labels: Verve, RCA, Capitol, 20th Century, Warner Bros., Polydor, Atlantic, Expansion, Cotillion, Curtom, ABC, Fantasy
- Website: rahncoleman.com

Ronald Edward "Rahn" Coleman (born April 5, 1949) is an American record producer, musical director, arranger, orchestrator, composer, vocal coach, and pianist. Coleman was born in San Francisco, California, and grew up in nearby Oakland, where he attended public school and began studying piano at age 4. He has also played oboe, clarinet, violin, English horn and pipe organ.

Coleman continued his musical training at Fisk University in Nashville, Tennessee and sang in the Fisk Jubilee Singers under director Matthew Kennedy. In 1969 he studied harmony and music theory with Nadia Boulanger at The American Conservatory in Fontainebleau, France.

== Career ==
Coleman has served as musical director, arranger, vocal coach and pianist for many notable singers, including: Aretha Franklin, Freda Payne, Nichelle Nichols, Michael Feinstein, Gladys Knight, Barry White, The Ojays, The Temptations, Tina Turner, Ray Charles, Ben Vereen, Marilyn McCoo, Billy Davis Jr., and Sarah Vaughan. He conducted the NBC Studio Orchestra, the Philadelphia Philharmonic, the 1993 Clinton Presidential Inaugural Orchestra and was featured on Dick Clark's American Bandstand 20th Anniversary Special. Coleman has toured nationally and internationally with Lou Rawls, Gladys Knight, Patti LaBelle, Joe Cocker, Marlena Shaw, Marvin Gaye, Tom Jones, Seals and Crofts, and Sammy Davis Jr.

In the realm of musical theater he has served as musical supervisor, musical director, arranger, orchestrator, and pianist for productions of Sammy, Ain't Misbehavin, The Wiz, Lady Day at Emerson's Bar and Grill, the Broadway production of Baby It's You, and the West Coast premiere of Breath and Imagination. He began collaborating with Sheldon Epps in 1991 as Music Director for Blues in the Night at the Los Angeles Theatre Center. Subsequent collaborations with Epps include: Ray Charles Live! A New Musical, Play On, and Purlie.

His theater credits include work at: The Broadhurst Theatre (New York); The Colony Theater Company (Burbank); International City Theatre (Long Beach); The Old Globe Theatre (San Diego); Pasadena Playhouse; Los Angeles Theatre Center; Post Street Theater (San Francisco); The Syracuse Stage; Goodman Theater (Chicago); Phoenix Theater; National Black Theater Festival (Winston-Salem, NC); Indiana Repertory Theater; Seattle Repertory Theater; Santa Barbara Civic Light Opera; and the Ojai Playwrights Conference.

== Awards ==
- 1991/92: recipient, The ariZoni Theater Award for Musical Direction (Lady Day at Emerson's Bar and Grill, Phoenix Theater)
- 1999: recipient, The Garland Award for Best Musical Director (Play On!, Pasadena Playhouse)
- 2008: recipient, NAACP Theatre Award for Best Music Director (Ray Charles Live! A New Musical, Pasadena Playhouse)
- 2013: nominee, NAACP Theatre Award for Best Music Director (Ain't Misbehavin, International City Theatre)

== Partial discography ==
- Hutson: Leroy Hutson (Curtom, 1975) - keyboards
- It's About Time: The Impressions (Cotillion, 1976) - keyboards
- Sweet Passion: Aretha Franklin (Atlantic, 1977) - keyboards
- The Show Must Go On: Four Tops (ABC Records, 1977) - keyboards
- Lawrence Hilton Jacobs (ABC, 1978) - keyboards
- Alton McClain & Destiny (Polydor Records, 1978) - keyboards
- Bittersweet: Lamont Dozier (Warner Bros, 1979) - arranger, keyboards
- Come Away With Me: The Originals (Fantasy, 1979) - keyboards
- Stronger Than You Think I Am: Edwin Starr (20th Century, 1980) - keyboards
- Love Uprising: Tavares (Capitol, 1980) - keyboards
- Get as Much Love as You Can: The Jones Girls (Philadelphia International, 1981) - keyboards
- The Woman in My Life: Stevie Woods (Cotillion Records, 1982) - keyboards
- Shoulda Been You: Leon Ware (Expansion, 1991) - composer
- The Very Best of The New Birth (RCA Records, 1995) - keyboards
- An Evening with Freda Payne: Live in Concert (1996) - musical director
- Loving Power / It's All About Time: The Impressions (American Beat Records, 1976/2008)
- Baby It's You original cast album (Verve, 2011) - arranger; producer
- Listen to This!: Cheryl Barnes (2013) - producer, arranger, composer, piano

=== With Barry White ===
- Barry White Sings for Someone You Love (20th Century Records, 1977) - arranger, piano
- The Man (20th Century, 1978) - composer of "The Early Years"
- I Love to Sing the Songs I Sing (20th Century, 1979) - arranger, piano
- The Message Is Love (Unlimited Gold, 1979) - arranger, piano
- How Did You Know It Was Me? (20th Century Records, 1979) - composer, orchestrator
- Barry White's Greatest Hits (Casablanca Records, Polygram Records, 1981) - arranger, piano
