= Rhapsody in White =

Studio album by The Love Unlimited Orchestra
- Released: January 1974
- Recorded: 1973
- Genres: R&B, disco
- Length: 38:37
- Label: 20th Century Records
- Producer: Barry White

The Love Unlimited Orchestra chronology
Rhapsody in White (1974)	Together Brothers (1974)

Professional ratings
Review scores
Source	Rating
AllMusic	link

Rhapsody in White is the debut studio album by American soul group the Love Unlimited Orchestra, released in 1974. It was a huge success for the group, which backed and was led by Barry White for many singles such as "I'm Gonna Love You Just a Little More Baby". Also on the album is the 1973 single "Love's Theme", their signature song, which reached No. 1 on the Billboard Hot 100.

== Track listing ==
All songs composed by Barry White except where noted.

1. "Barry's Theme"
2. "Rhapsody in White"
3. "Midnight and You" (Billy Page, Gene Page)
4. "I Feel Love Comin' On" (Barry White, Paul Politi)
5. "Baby Blues" (Barry White, Tony Sepe)
6. "Don't Take It Away from Me"
7. "What a Groove"
8. "Love's Theme"

== Charts ==
Chart (1974)	Peak position
Australian Albums (Kent Music Report)	26
Canada Top Albums/CDs (RPM)	7
UK Albums (Official Charts)	50
US Billboard 200	8
US Top R&B/Hip-Hop Albums (Billboard)	2
