= Under the Influence of... Love Unlimited =

Under The Influence of...

Studio album by Love Unlimited
- Released: July 1973
- Recorded: 1973
- Genre: Disco
- Length: 33:34
- Label: 20th Century Records
- Producer: Barry White

Love Unlimited chronology
Love Unlimited (1972)	Under The Influence of... (1973)	In Heat (1974)

Under The Influence of... is the second studio album by Love Unlimited.

== Reception ==
Professional ratings
Review scores
Source	Rating
Allmusic	4/5 stars

Released in the summer of 1973, this album would chart at #3 in the U.S. R&B charts and reach #1 in Canada on the RPM national albums chart.

== Track listing ==
All tracks composed by Barry White except where indicated

1. "Love's Theme" (Instrumental) - 4:08
2. "Under the Influence of Love" (White, Paul Politi) - 4:09
3. "Lovin' You, That's All I'm After" - 4:29
4. "Oh Love, Well We Finally Made It" - 3:50
5. "Say It Again" - 3:19
6. "Someone Really Cares For You" - 5:40
7. "It May Be Winter Outside (But in My Heart It's Spring)" (White, Paul Politi) - 4:14
8. "Yes, We Finally Made It" - 3:45

== Charts ==
Chart (1974)	Peak position
Canadian RPM Album Chart	1
Billboard Top LPs & Tape	3
Billboard Top Soul Albums	3

=== Singles ===
Year	Single	Chart positions	
Year	Single	US Pop	US R&B
1973	"It May Be Winter Outside, (But In My Heart It's Spring)"	83	35 (1974)
1973	"Oh Love, Well We Finally Made It"	-	70
1974	"Under the Influence of Love"	76	70
