= I Feel Love Comin' On =

1967 song by Felice Taylor

"I Feel Love Comin' On" was a 1967 song that became an international success for the African-American singer Felice Taylor. The song was written and produced by Paul Politi and Barry White, and recorded with musical accompaniment by the Bob Keane Orchestra.

The song had been planned as the third single release of Taylor after her two charting hits in the United States "It May Be Winter Outside (But in My Heart It's Spring)" and "Under the Influence of Love". When the release did not materialize, Mustang Records (a subsidiary of Bronco Records), the original holder of rights to the song, leased it to President Records in 1967 for release in the UK. The single proved a commercial success there, peaking at No. 11 in the UK Singles Chart.

The song was covered by the Love Unlimited Orchestra, a musical group established by Barry White. It appeared on their 1974 album, Rhapsody in White. Dana also recorded a version in 1982, which peaked at no. 66 in the UK charts.
