= Dedicated =

Dedicated may refer to:

== Music ==
- Dedicated Records, a British record label

=== Albums ===
- Dedicated (ATB album), 2002
- Dedicated (Renée Geyer album), 2007
- Dedicated (Carly Rae Jepsen album), 2019
- Dedicated (Lemar album), 2003
- Dedicated (Murphy's Law album), 1996
- Dedicated (The Marshall Tucker Band album), 1981
- Dedicated (Wilson Phillips album), 2012
- Dedicated '88–'91, a 2000 album by Upper Hutt Posse
- Dedicated, an album by Barry White 1983
- Dedicated, an album by Ralph Bowen 2009
- Dedicated Lemar (born 1978), 2004
- Dedicated: A Salute to the 5 Royales Steve Cropper, 2011
- Dedicated Kendrick Lamar (born 1987), 2013
- Dedicated Murphy's law, 1996
- Dedicated Evil Activities, 2003
- Dedicated Seven (band), 2002
- Dedicated, Vol. 1 Antônio Carlos Jobim 1998
- Dedicated, Vol. 2 Antônio Carlos Jobim 1998
- Dedicated Tyrone Jackson, 2005
- Dedicated The Cockman Family, a bluegrass/Gospel band from Sherrills Ford, North Carolina, United States
- Dedicated Uwe Oberg 2005
- Dedicated Aldubáran 2003
- Dedicated (Barry White album)

=== Songs ===
- "Dedicated", a song by Linkin Park from Songs from the Underground
- "Dedicated", a song by Parkway Drive from Ire
- "Dedicated" (song), a 1992 song by R. Kelly and Public Announcement from Born into the 90's
- "Dedicated", by A-Trak, Nick Catchdubs, Freeway
- "Dedicated", by Agerman, French Braids, Keak da Sneak
- "Dedicated", by Art Pepper
- "Dedicated", by ATB Composed by André Tanneberger
- "Dedicated", by Boss Hog
- "Dedicated", by Cornershop
- "Dedicated", by Digable Planets
- "Dedicated", by Delta Saxophone Quartet
- "Dedicated", by Das EFX
- "Dedicated", by DJ Drama and Lil Wayne
- "Dedicated", by DJ Screw
- "Dedicated", by Funkdoobiest
- "Dedicated", by Heather B., Tammy Lucas, and Pete Rock
- "Dedicated", by Heavy D & the Boyz
- "Dedicated", by Keak da Sneak
- "Dedicated", by Lemar
- "Dedicated", by Lupe Fiasco
- "Dedicated", by Mariah Carey featuring Nas from Me. I Am Mariah... The Elusive Chanteuse
- "Dedicated", by MF Doom and MF Grimm
- "Dedicated", by Minimal Compact
- "Dedicated", by Nas from Magic
- "Dedicated", by Paul Carrack
- "Dedicated", by Sweet Trip
- "Dedicated", by The Shirelles

== See also ==
- Dedication (disambiguation)
