= I Belong to You (Love Unlimited song) =

1974 single by Love Unlimited

- Side A of the US single

Single by Love Unlimited

from the album In Heat
- B-side: "And Only You"
- Released: November 1974
- Genre: R&B
- Length: 3:12
- Label: 20th Century
- Songwriter: Barry White
- Producer: Barry White

Love Unlimited singles chronology
"People of Tomorrow Are the Children of Today" (1974)	"I Belong to You" (1974)	"Share a Little Love in Your Heart" (1975)

"I Belong To You" is a 1974 single by the trio Love Unlimited, which was their only single to hit number 1 on the R&B chart (for one week, in early 1975). It was their second and last Top 40 entry, peaking at number 27.

== Background ==
The ballad was done in a retro girl group singing style and was written and produced by Barry White.

== Chart performance ==
Chart (1974–75)	Peak position
Canada RPM Top Singles	37
U.S. Billboard Hot 100	27
U.S. Cash Box Top 100	29
U.S. Billboard Hot Soul Singles	1

== Samples ==
- Mariah Carey's "It's a Wrap" samples the song on her 2009 Island Def Jam album Memoirs of an Imperfect Angel.
