= I Love to Sing the Songs I Sing =

Studio album by Barry White
- Released: April 10, 1979
- Genre: R&B, soul
- Length: 36:19
- Label: 20th Century Fox
- Producer: Barry White

Barry White chronology
The Message Is Love (1979)	I Love to Sing the Songs I Sing (1979)	Sheet Music (1980)

Singles from I Love to Sing the Songs I Sing
- 1. "I Love to Sing the Songs I Sing" Released: August 1979; 2. "How Did You Know It Was Me?" Released: December 1979

Professional ratings
Review scores
Source	Rating
AllMusic	4/5 stars
The Virgin Encyclopedia of R&B and Soul	2/5 stars

I Love to Sing the Songs I Sing is the self-produced ninth album by American R&B singer Barry White, released in April 1979 on the 20th Century-Fox Records label.

== Overview ==
I Love to Sing the Songs I Sing fulfilled White's 20th Century-Fox Records contract. White was increasingly dissatisfied with that label's management when Russ Regan left the label to form Millennium Records and felt that he was being ignored in terms of promotion at the time. He then left the company and signed a custom label contract with CBS Records to release future material under his own Unlimited Gold imprint. White's first album on his new label, The Message Is Love, had been released earlier in the year. With attention and interest focused on his well-publicized CBS deal, I Love to Sing the Songs I Sing passed by largely unnoticed. It was the least successful album of his 20th Century career, only reaching number 40 on the R&B chart, which six of his eight previous albums had topped. None of the single releases made any impact either.

== Track listing ==
1. "I Love to Sing the Songs I Sing" (Barry White, Paul Politi, Frank Wilson) – 2:50
2. "Girl, What's Your Name" (White, Danny Pearson, Wilson) – 4:08
3. "Once Upon a Time (You Were a Friend of Mine)" (Rahn Coleman) – 6:01
4. "Oh Me, Oh My (I'm Such a Lucky Guy)" (White, Wilson, Politi, Raymond Cooksey) – 5:04
5. "I Can't Leave You Alone" (White, Tony Sepe, Wilson) – 3:25
6. "Call Me Baby" (Coleman) – 8:04
7. "How Did You Know It Was Me?" (Coleman) – 6:47

== Personnel ==
- Barry White – lead vocals, arranger
- John Roberts, Ronald Coleman – orchestration

Technical

- Frank Kejmar, Paul Elmore – engineer
- Glen Christensen – art direction, design

== Charts ==
=== Album ===
Chart performance for I Love to Sing the Songs I Sing
Chart (1979)	Peak position
US Billboard 200	132
US Top R&B/Hip-Hop Albums (Billboard)	40

=== Singles ===
Chart performance for singles from I Love to Sing the Songs I Sing
Year	Single	
Year	Single	US R&B
1979	"I Love to Sing the Songs I Sing"	53
1979	"How Did You Know It Was Me?"	64
