= My Sweet Summer Suite =

Single by Love Unlimited Orchestra

from the album My Sweet Summer Suite
- B-side: "Just Living It Up"
- Released: 1976
- Genre: Disco
- Length: 4:55 (7" version); 7:17 (12" version); 5:01 (Album version)
- Label: 20th Century
- Songwriter(s): Barry White
- Producer(s): Barry White

Love Unlimited Orchestra singles chronology
"Midnight Groove" (1975)	"My Sweet Summer Suite" (1976)	"Theme from King Kong (Part 1)" (1977)

"My Sweet Summer Suite" is a 1976 instrumental single by Love Unlimited Orchestra and written by Barry White, taken from the My Sweet Summer Suite album. The single was #1 for three non consecutive weeks on the Billboard's Hot Dance/Club Play chart, and crossed over to both the soul charts, peaking at No. 28 (Hot R&B charts), and to the pop charts, where it reached number forty-eight. This single is often cited as a model of "Los Angeles–style" disco song.
