= Under the Influence of Love =

"I'm Under the Influence of Love"

Single by Felice Taylor
- Released: 1967
- Recorded: 1967
- Genre: R&B
- Label: President, Mustang
- Songwriter(s): Paul Politi, Barry White

Felice Taylor singles chronology
"It May Be Winter Outside (But In My Heart It's Spring)" (1967)	"I'm Under the Influence of Love" (1967)	"I Feel Love Comin' On" (1967)

"Under the Influence of Love"

Single by Love Unlimited

from the album Under the Influence of... Love Unlimited
- Released: March 30, 1974
- Recorded: 1973
- Genre: R&B
- Length: 4:09
- Songwriter(s): Paul Politi, Barry White

Love Unlimited singles chronology
"It May Be Winter Outside (But in My Heart It's Spring)" (1973)	"Under the Influence of Love" (1974)	"I Belong to You" (1974)

"Under the Influence of Love" is a song written by Paul Politi and Barry White. Felice Taylor had a minor hit with it in 1967.

== Love Unlimited version ==
The song was covered by Love Unlimited on their 1973 album Under the Influence of... Love Unlimited. The single release in 1974 reached number 70 on the US Billboard R&B chart and number 76 on the Billboard Hot 100.

== Other covers ==
The song was covered by Kylie Minogue on her 2000 album Light Years.
