= Sheet Music (Barry White album) =

Studio album by Barry White
- Released: July 1980
- Genres: Soul, R&B, disco, funk
- Length: 36:57
- Label: Unlimited Gold
- Producer: Barry White

Barry White chronology
I Love to Sing the Songs I Sing (1979)	Sheet Music (1980)	Beware! (1981)

Singles from Sheet Music
- 1. "Sheet Music" Released: April 1980; 2. "Love Makin' Music" Released: July 1980; 3. "I Believe in Love" Released: October 1980

Professional ratings
Review scores
Source	Rating
AllMusic	2.5/5 stars

Sheet Music is the self-produced eleventh album by American R&B singer Barry White, and the second release on his own CBS-affiliated custom label, Unlimited Gold. Although it peaked at No. 19 in the R&B charts, it was a commercial disappointment. "Love Makin' Music" was the most successful of the single releases, peaking at No. 25 in the R&B charts. White also recorded this track as well as "She's Everything to Me" in Spanish for the Latin-American market as "Mi nueva canción" and "Ella es todo para mí" respectively. The London branch of CBS Records went for "Rum and Coke" as the second single, but as none of his singles on his new labels had managed to reach the UK Singles Charts, they stopped releasing any further singles off any of his following four albums. The Netherlands belatedly released the track "Ghetto Letto" as a single in August 1981, choosing it over White's then current single "Louie Louie".

== Track listing ==
1. "Sheet Music" (Barry White, Paul Politi) – 7:02
2. "Lady, Sweet Lady" (Normal Salitt) – 5:40
3. "I Believe in Love" (Barry White, Austin Johnson, Smead Hudman) – 8:06
4. "Ghetto Letto" (Barry White, Paul Politi, Vella Maria Cameron) – 5:57
5. "Rum and Coke" (Al Stillman, Jeri Sullivan, Morey Amsterdam, Paul Baron, Lionel Belasco, Lord Invader) – 2:32
6. "She's Everything to Me" (Barry White, Bernard Butler) – 2:40
7. "Love Makin' Music" (Aaron Schroeder, Jerry Ragovoy) – 4:59

== Singles ==
US

- "Sheet Music"/"Sheet Music" (Instrumental) (Unlimited Gold, ZS9 1415)
- "Love Makin' Music"/"She's Everything to Me" (Unlimited Gold, ZS9 1418)
- "I Believe in Love"/"You're the One I Need" (Unlimited Gold, ZS6 1420)

UK

- "Sheet Music"/"Sheet Music" (Instrumental) (Unlimited Gold, S ULG 8563)
- "Rum and Coke (Rum and Coca-Cola)"/"She's Everything to Me" (Unlimited Gold, S ULG 8901)

Netherlands

- "Sheet Music"/"Sheet Music" (Instrumental) (Unlimited Gold, S ULG 8563)
- "Ghetto Letto"/"Louie Louie" (Unlimited Gold, ULGA 1750)(August 1981)

Year	Single	
Year	Single	US R&B
1980	"Sheet Music"	43
1980	"Love Makin' Music"	25
1980	"I Believe in Love"	71
1981	"Mi nueva canción/Ella es todo para mí"	—

== Charts ==
Chart (1980)	Peak position
US Billboard 200	85
US Top R&B/Hip-Hop Albums (Billboard)	19

== Unsuccessful Barry & Glodean follow-up album ==
For White's next LP he went into the studio with his wife Glodean White (née James), former lead singer of his girl group Love Unlimited who had by now disbanded, to record an album of duets. Released in March 1981 with a lavish cover shot of the couple, taken by photographer Todd Gray, the album and its three singles "I Want You", "You're the Only One for Me", and "Didn't We Make It Happen, Baby" were White's first to miss the Billboard charts altogether, a fact that White blamed on CBS not pressing enough copies to meet demand. The couple finally appeared on Soul Train, performing the tracks "I Want You" and "The Better Love Is (The Worse It Is When It's Over)", September 19, 1981, six months after the album had been released, but by then the momentum was lost. White debuted his next single, a cover of Richard Berry's "Louie Louie" on the same show, off his next album Beware.
