= In Heat =

In Heat may refer to:

- Estrous cycle in animals (usually referred to as "in heat")
- In Heat (Love Unlimited album) (1974)
- In Heat (The Romantics album) (1983)
- In Heat (Black 'N Blue album) (1988)
- In Heat (Fuzztones album), 1989
- "In Heat" (Criminal Minds), an episode of the U.S. TV series Criminal Minds
- "In Heat", an episode of Broad City
