= Dedicated (Barry White album) =

Studio album by Barry White
- Released: March 1983
- Length: 44:07
- Label: Unlimited Gold
- Producer: Barry White

Barry White chronology
Change (1982)	Dedicated (1983)	The Right Night & Barry White (1987)

Singles from Dedicated
- 1. "America" Released: Jun 1983; 2. "Don't Let 'em Blow Your Mind" Released: Sep 1983

Dedicated is Barry White's fifteenth studio album, released in March 1983. White's popularity and record sales were at an all-time low and, as a consequence, his relationship with CBS Records had soured. Dedicated and his album Rise with the Love Unlimited Orchestra, released around the same time, sold poorly and failed to chart. All the tracks were recorded at White's R.I.S.E. studio in the grounds of Sherman Oaks, with White and Jack Perry playing all instruments of the rhythm section themselves. Gene Page added the strings. White dedicated the album to his mother, Sadie Marie Carter.

== Cover versions ==
"All in the Run of One Day" is a new recording of one of White's early recordings from 1967. "Dreams" was a revamp of a track from the Love Unlimited Orchestra's 1981 album with Webster Lewis. "Love Song" was a cover of an early Elton John-song, written by Lesley Duncan.

== Recording hiatus ==
CBS released White from his contract in 1984. Since 1977, 14 albums had been released in total on his Unlimited Gold label, five by himself, one duet album with his wife Glodean, one album by Love Unlimited, three by the Love Unlimited Orchestra, and one each by his signings Danny Pearson and Jimmie & Vella Cameron. Its biggest success had been a 1980 2-LP set of his greatest hits from his 20th Century-years. White had lost an estimated $10 million over those seven years. CBS was so keen to get out of their deal that they even returned all the mastertapes to White. In April 1984, White received a phone call from Marvin Gaye who wanted him to produce his next album. Only the next day, he woke up to the news that Gaye had been killed by his father. For the next three years, White survived on royalty checks from his glory years and the occasional touring, before finding new spirit when he signed with A&M Records and started recording again.

== CD reissues ==
The album would see a CD release in 1993. In 1996, Japan re-issued the album on a gatefold miniature LP-replica compact disc.

== Track listing ==
1. "America" (Barry White) - 5:47
2. "Free" (Barry White, Carl Taylor, Ricky Robertson) - 5:45
3. "Don't Forget ... Remember" (White) - 5:45
4. "Life" (Barry White, Jack Perry) - 3:40
5. "Love Song" (Lesley Duncan) - 5:50
6. "All in the Run of a Day" (Barry White, Robert Staunton) - 6:55
7. "Don't Let 'Em Blow Your Mind" (White, Perry) - 6:48
8. "Dreams" (Barry White, Webster Lewis) - 4:20

=== Singles ===
- "America" (3:39) / "Life" (4:30) (Unlimited Gold, ZS4 03957)
- "Don't Let Them Blow Your Mind" (4:32) / "Dreams" (4:06) (Unlimited Gold, ZS4 04098)
