= The Man (Barry White album) =

Studio album by Barry White
- Released: October 1978
- Recorded: June – August 1978
- Genres: Soul; funk; disco
- Length: 48:44
- Label: 20th Century Fox
- Producer: Barry White

Barry White chronology
Barry White Sings for Someone You Love (1977)	The Man (1978)	The Message Is Love (1979)

Singles from The Man
- 1. "Your Sweetness Is My Weakness" Released: September 1978; 2. "Just the Way You Are" Released: December 1978; 3. "Sha La La Means I Love You" Released: March 1979

The Man is the self-produced eighth album by American soul singer Barry White, released in 1978 on the revived 20th Century-Fox Records label, which saw its name reverted from 20th Century.

Professional ratings
Review scores
Source	Rating
AllMusic	3.5/5 stars
Christgau's Record Guide	B

== History ==
The album became White's sixth R&B chart topper and peaked at number 36 on the pop chart. Lead single "Your Sweetness Is My Weakness" reached number 2 on the R&B chart and number 60 on the Billboard Hot 100, while White's cover of Billy Joel's "Just the Way You Are" reached number 45 on the R&B chart and peaked at number 12 on the UK Singles Chart. A third single, "Sha La La Means I Love You", peaked at number 55 on the UK Singles Chart. A cover version of "It's Only Love Doing Its Thing" (with the shortened title "It's Only Love") would be a hit for British band Simply Red in 1989. The album was digitally remastered and reissued on CD on September 24, 1996, by Mercury Records.

== Track listing ==
Side one
No.	Title	Writer(s)	Length
1.	"Look at Her"	Frank Wilson, Raymond Cooksey, Tommy Payton	7:40
2.	"Your Sweetness Is My Weakness"	Barry White	8:04
3.	"Sha La La Means I Love You"	Barry White	8:00

Side two
No.	Title	Writer(s)	Length
1.	"September When I First Met You"	Barry White, Frank Wilson, Paul Politi, Ervin Brown	6:57
2.	"It's Only Love Doing Its Thing"	Jimmie Cameron, Vella Cameron	4:04
3.	"Just the Way You Are"	Billy Joel	7:09
4.	"Early Years"	Ronald Coleman	6:50

== Charts ==
=== Weekly charts ===
Weekly chart performance for The Man
Chart (1978)	Peak position
Australian Albums (Kent Music Report)	97
UK Albums (Official Charts)	46
US Billboard 200	36
US Top R&B/Hip-Hop Albums (Billboard)	1

=== Year-end charts ===
Year-end chart performance for The Man
Chart (1979)	Position
US Billboard 200	99
US Top R&B/Hip-Hop Albums (Billboard)	6

=== Singles ===
Chart performance for singles from The Man
Year	Single	Peak chart positions			
Year	Single	US	US R&B	US Dan	UK
1978	"Your Sweetness Is My Weakness"	60	2	16	—
1978	"Just the Way You Are"	102	45	—	12
1979	"Sha La La Means I Love You"	—	—	—	55

== Certifications and sales ==
Certifications and sales for The Man
Region	Certification	Certified units/sales
United States (RIAA)	Platinum	1,000,000^{^}
^{^} Shipments figures based on certification alone.

== See also ==
- List of number-one R&B albums of 1978 (U.S.)
