= Felice Taylor =

American singer

- Also known as: Florain Taylor
- Born: Florain Corella Flanagan; January 29, 1944; Richmond, California, United States
- Died: June 12, 2017 (aged 73)
- Genres: R&B, pop, soul
- Occupation: Singer
- Labels: Groovy, Mustang, President
- Formerly of: The Sweets

Felice Taylor (born Florain Corella Flanagan, January 29, 1944 – June 12, 2017) was an American soul and pop singer, best known for her recordings in the late 1960s.

== The Sweets ==
The Sweets
- Origin: United States
- Genres: R&B, pop, soul
- Years active: 1965
- Label: Valiant
- Past members: Florain (later Felice) Taylor; Norma Flanagan; Darlene Flanagan

Born in Richmond, California, United States, Taylor began singing with her sisters Norma and Darlene Flanagan in a trio, The Sweets, who recorded two singles, "The Richest Girl", for the Valiant label in 1965 and "Satisfy Me Baby" on the Soul Town label.

== Solo career ==
Taylor's first solo recording, "Think About Me" on the Groovy label, was credited to Florain Taylor. Her greatest success came after signing for Bob Keane's Mustang label, a subsidiary of Bronco Records. There she was teamed with the songwriters and record producers, Barry White and Paul Politi, who co-wrote "It May Be Winter Outside (But in My Heart It's Spring)", a minor hit reaching No. 42 on the Billboard Hot 100 and No. 44 on the R&B chart in early 1967, and its follow-up "I'm Under the Influence of Love". A third single, "I Feel Love Comin' On", also written and produced by White and Politi was not released in the US, but reached No. 11 in the UK Singles Chart, when leased to President Records later in 1967.

After leaving Bronco, Taylor recorded for Kent Records, and later in the UK with members of The Equals. In 1973, White's protégées Love Unlimited recorded new versions of "It May Be Winter Outside" and "Under the Influence of Love" and Barry White recorded "I Feel Love Comin' On" on the Love Unlimited Orchestra's top ten album Rhapsody in White. Taylor herself seems not to have recorded after the early 1970s.

== Personal life ==
She was married to Johnny B Taylor and had four children.

She died in June 2017, aged 73. She was interred at the Riverside National Cemetery in Riverside, California.

== Discography ==
=== Singles ===
Year	Single	Peak chart positions		
Year	Single	US Pop	US R&B	UK
1966	"Think About Me" (credited as Florain Taylor)	―	―	―
1966	"It May Be Winter Outside (But in My Heart It's Spring)"	42	44	—
1967	"I'm Under the Influence of Love"	—	―	―
1967	"I Feel Love Comin' On"	—	―	11
1968	"I Can Feel Your Love"	―	―	―
1968	"Suree-Surrender"	―	―	―
1968	"Captured by Your Love"	―	―	―
"—" denotes releases that did not chart or were not released in that territory.
