= Dedication =

Dedication often refers to various religious and secular ceremonies and practices such as:

- Dedication (ritual) the ritual or ceremonial establishment of a purpose for a person, place, or thing
  - Dedication of churches
  - Child dedication, a Christian ceremony
- Pariṇāmanā (Sanskrit), commonly rendered in English as Dedication
- Hanukkah, a Jewish holiday commemorating the Maccabean Revolt
- Dedication stone
- Date stone, sometimes also referred to as a dedication stone

Dedication often refers also to honor or tribute:

- Dedication (art)
- Dedication (publishing)

Dedication may also refer to:

== Ceremonies ==
- Opening ceremony, grand opening, or ribbon cutting ceremonies serve to dedicate buildings and groups
- Ceremonial ship launching

== Film and television ==
- Dedication (film), a 2007 film starring Billy Crudup and Mandy Moore
- Dedications (MuchMusic), a Canadian television program
- "Dedication" (The Unit), a television episode

== Literature ==
- Dedication (publishing), in book design, a page in the front matter
- "Dedication" (short story), a 1988 story by Stephen King
- Dedication or The Stuff of Dreams, a 2005 play by Terrence McNally
- "For John F. Kennedy His Inauguration" or "Dedication", a 1961 poem by Robert Frost

== Music ==
=== Classical ===
- "Dedication", a 1918 composition by Peter Warlock

=== Albums ===
- Dedication (Ahmed Abdullah album), 1998
- Dedication (Bay City Rollers album) or the title song, 1976
- Dedication (Chief Keef album), 2017
- Dedication (Gary U.S. Bonds album) or the title song, 1981
- Dedication (Herbie Hancock album), 1974
- Dedication (Mal Waldron album) or the title song, 1985
- Dedication (Raised Fist album) or the title song, 2002
- Dedication (Robin Eubanks and Steve Turre album), 1989
- Dedication (Steve Kuhn album) or the title song, 1998
- Dedication (Zomby album), 2011
- Dedication!, by Duke Pearson, 1970
- Dedication: The Very Best of Thin Lizzy or the title song, 1991
- Dedications (Toshiko Akiyoshi Trio album), 1976
  - Dedications II, Akiyoshi album released in the U.S. as Dedications, 1977
- The Dedication, a mixtape by Lil Wayne, with DJ Drama, 2005
- Dedication, an EP by Kalin and Myles, 2014
- Ihda' (Dedication), by DAM, 2006

=== Songs ===
- "Dedication" (Bay City Rollers song), 1976
- "Dedication" (Nipsey Hussle song), 2018
- "Dedication", by Beastie Boys from Hello Nasty, 1998
- "Dedication", by Brand Nubian from One for All, 1990
- "Dedication", by War from Eric Burdon Declares "War", 1970
- "Dedication", the closing theme music for the British TV programme Record Breakers

== See also ==
- Dedication Stone
- Dedicate (horse)
- Dedicated (disambiguation)
- Christening (disambiguation)
