= Love Is Back =

Studio album by Love Unlimited
- Released: 1979
- Genre: Soul, R&B
- Length: 34:09
- Label: Unlimited Gold/CBS Records
- Producer: Barry White

Love Unlimited chronology
He's All I've Got (1977)	Love Is Back (1979)

Love Is Back is the fifth studio album by Love Unlimited. It was published by the label CBS Records. The album starts with the track "I'm So Glad That I'm a Woman", an R&B song considered by many a hymn to women, written by Barry White (creator of the group), Frank Wilson and Paul Politi. Three tracks entered the charts: "I'm So Glad That I'm a Woman", "High Steppin', Hip Dressin' Fella (You Got It Together)" and "If You Want Me, Say It" but all three songs didn't get to a high position because of promotion problems.

== Track listing ==
No.	Title	Writer(s)	Length
1.	"I'm So Glad That I'm a Woman"	Barry White; Frank Wilson; Paul Politi	4:01
2.	"High Steppin', Hip Dressin' Fella (You Got It Together)"	White; Wilson; Politi	5:32
3.	"When I'm in Your Arms, Everything's Okay"	White; Wilson; Politi	4:33
4.	"If You Want Me, Say It"	White; Wilson; Politi	5:41
5.	"I'm Givin' You a Love (Every Man is Searchin' For)"	White; Wilson; Politi	4:30
6.	"Gotta Be Where You Are"	White	4:14
7.	"I'm His Woman"	White; Barbara J. Borde; Politi	5:38
