= Walkin' in the Rain with the One I Love =

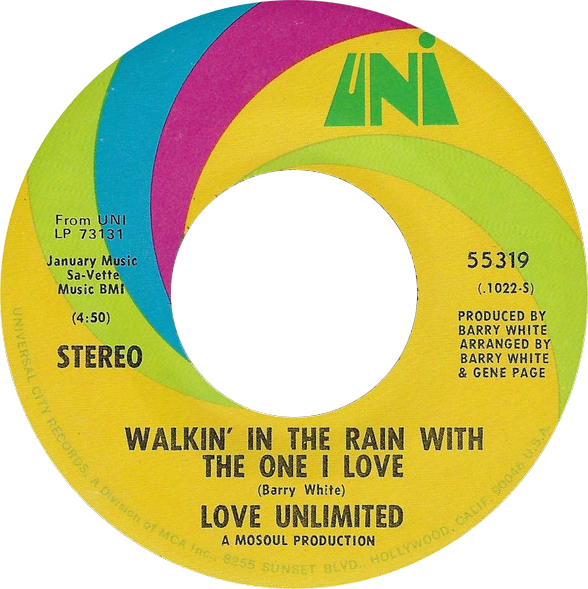
- Side A of the US single

Single by Love Unlimited

from the album From a Girl's Point of View We Give to You...Love Unlimited
- B-side: "I Should Have Known"
- Released: March 1972
- Genre: R&B
- Length: 4:50
- Label: Uni
- Songwriter(s): Barry White
- Producer(s): Barry White

Love Unlimited singles chronology
"Walkin' in the Rain with the One I Love" (1972)	"Is It Really True Boy - Is It Really Me" (1972)

Walkin' in the Rain with the One I Love was an R&B single in 1972 for the soul trio Love Unlimited, a studio group created by singer/producer Barry White. The main vocalists were female singers Glodean James, her sister, Linda James, and their cousin Diane Taylor. Glodean would eventually become White's wife in 1974; the couple would split up in 1988, though they never divorced.

The song is notable for White's vocal appearance as a voice on the telephone. The lush sound and romantic atmosphere led to this becoming Love Unlimited's first hit record, eventually rising to #14 both on the U.S. Billboard Hot 100 and in the UK, as well as reaching #6 on the Soul Singles chart in the spring of 1972.

The record sold over a million copies, thus receiving a gold record for its sales. It would precede White's debut as a solo act on the Billboard charts by one year, when he hit #1 R&B with "I'm Gonna Love You Just A Little More Baby" in May 1973.

== Chart history ==
=== Weekly charts ===
Chart (1972)	Peak position
Canada RPM Top Singles	40
UK (OCC)	14
US Billboard Hot 100	14
US Billboard R&B	6
US Cash Box Top 100	7

=== Year-end charts ===
Chart (1972)	Rank
US Billboard Hot 100	98
US Cash Box	74
