= He's All I've Got =

Studio album by Love Unlimited
- Released: 1977
- Recorded: 1976–1977
- Genre: Dance
- Length: 35:27
- Label: Unlimited Gold
- Producer: Barry White

Love Unlimited chronology
In Heat (1974)	He's All I've Got (1977)	Love Is Back (1979)

He's All I've Got is a studio album by the American vocal group Love Unlimited. It was released by Unlimited Gold Records in 1977. The album was produced and arranged by Barry White. Love Unlimited promoted the album by performing the title track on Soul Train.

== Critical reception ==
Professional ratings
Review scores
Source	Rating
AllMusic	3/5 stars
Omaha World-Herald	2.5/5 stars
The New Rolling Stone Record Guide	1/5 stars
The Virgin Encyclopedia of R&B and Soul	2/5 stars

The Calgary Herald deemed the album "another danceable menu of spun-sugar composition." The Daily Herald-Tribune called it "champagne music for lovers everywhere."

== Track listing ==
- All songs written by Barry White, except track 1 (Linda Laurie, Terry Etlinger)

No.	Title	Length
1.	"I Did It for Love"	4:59
2.	"Never, Never Say Goodbye"	5:38
3.	"Whisper You Love Me"	5:15
4.	"He's Mine"	3:34
5.	"I Can't Let Him Down"	3:27
6.	"I Guess I'm Just Another Girl in Love"	5:11
7.	"He's All I've Got"	7:23
