= Put Me in Your Mix =

Studio album by Barry White
- Released: October 8, 1991 (North America); October 21, 1991 (international)
- Recorded: 1990–1991
- Genre: R&B, soul, funk
- Length: 64:59 (North America); 73:11 (International)
- Label: A&M/PolyGram; 215 377 (North America); 397 170 (international)
- Producer: Barry White, Jack Perry, Howard Johnson

Barry White chronology
The Man Is Back! (1989)	Put Me in Your Mix (1991)	The Icon Is Love (1994)

Professional ratings
Review scores
Source	Rating
Allmusic	link

Put Me in Your Mix is a 1991 album by R&B singer Barry White. Regarded as a return to form, with exemplary slow jams, it was the third album of his comeback phase and contained the smash title track. The album also contained production akin to contemporary R&B, featuring electronic instrumentation and, particularly, the presence of a Linn Drum combined with White’s traditional symphonic arrangements. Glodean White sang back-up vocals, and Isaac Hayes sang duet on “Dark and Lovely (You over There).” The album reached number 96 on the Billboard 200 and number 8 on the Billboard top R&B albums chart.

== Track listing ==
1. "Let's Get Busy" – 4:44
2. "Love Is Good with You" – 6:10
3. "For Real Chill" – 5:49
4. "Break it Down with You" – 6:24
5. "Volare" – 5:45
6. "Put Me in Your Mix" (Howard Johnson, Barry White) – 7:35
7. "Who You Giving Your Love To" – 5:26
8. "Love Will Find Us" – 7:07
9. "We're Gonna Have it All" – 5:55
10. "Dark and Lovely (You over There)" [duet with Isaac Hayes] – 10:05

International bonus track
11. "Sho' You Right" [Remix] – 8:02

== Charts ==
=== Weekly charts ===
Chart (1991)	Peak position
US Billboard 200	96
US Top R&B/Hip-Hop Albums (Billboard)	8

=== Year-end charts ===
Chart (1992)	Position
US Top R&B/Hip-Hop Albums (Billboard)	45
