= The Icon Is Love =

Studio album by Barry White
- Released: October 4, 1994
- Recorded: 1993–1994
- Studios: Record One (Sherman Oaks, California); Flyte Tyme (Edina, Minnesota)
- Genres: R&B; soul
- Length: 73:46
- Labels: A&M/PolyGram; 540 115
- Producers: Barry White; Gerald Levert; Jack Perry; Tony Nicholas; Chuckii Booker; James Harris III; Terry Lewis

Barry White chronology
Put Me in Your Mix (1991)	The Icon Is Love (1994)	Staying Power (1999)

The Icon Is Love is the nineteenth studio album by American R&B singer Barry White, which was released on October 4, 1994, on A&M Records. The album represented a major comeback for White both critically and commercially, and went on to become easily his most successful album since his 1970s heyday.

== Composition ==
Production credits on the album were mainly shared by White variously with Gerald Levert, Jack Perry, Edwin Nicholas and White's godson Chuckii Booker. The Icon Is Love also includes two tracks ("I Only Want to Be with You" and "Come On") produced by Jimmy Jam and Terry Lewis and recorded at their Flyte Tyme studios in Minnesota, which are the only tracks ever recorded by White on which he does not have at least a co-production credit. The album contains a remix of "Super Lover", from White's 1989 album The Man Is Back! as a bonus track.

== Critical reception ==
Professional ratings
Review scores
Source	Rating
AllMusic	link
Cash Box	(favorable)
Robert Christgau	1/3 stars

The Icon Is Love was the first White album since the 1970s to garner almost universal critical acclaim in terms both of the quality of the material and its contemporary production standards and sound. The album won the 1995 Soul Train Music Award for Best R&B/Soul Album, Male, and in 1996 was nominated for a Grammy Award in the category Best R&B Album, losing out to TLC's CrazySexyCool.

== Commercial performance ==
The Icon Is Love was White's seventh album to top the US R&B chart, and its peak of No. 20 on the pop chart his highest placing there since 1977. It was also the first White album in 16 years to reach the UK top 50. The lead single "Practice What You Preach" was White's biggest since 1977's "It's Ecstasy When You Lay Down Next to Me" on both the R&B and pop charts.

== Track listing ==
1. "Practice What You Preach" (Barry White, Gerald Levert, Edwin Nicholas) – 5:59
2. "There It Is" (White, Levert, Nicholas) – 7:03
3. "I Only Want to Be with You" (James Harris III, Terry Lewis, White) – 5:01
4. "The Time Is Right" (White, Chuckii Booker) – 5:46
5. "Baby's Home" (Barry Eastmond, Gary Brown, Jolyon Skinner) – 8:17
6. "Come On" (Harris, Lewis, White, James Wright) – 5:50
7. "Love Is the Icon" (White, Jack Perry) – 4:38
8. "Sexy Undercover" (White, Booker) – 4:51
9. "Don't You Want to Know?" (White, Michael Lovesmith) – 6:51
10. "Whatever We Had, We Had" (White, Lovesmith) – 10:41
11. "Super Lover (Undercover Mix)" (White, Perry, William Jones) – 5:49

== Singles ==
- "Practice What You Preach" (US Pop #18, US R&B #1, UK #20)
- "Love Is the Icon" (US R&B #43)
- "Come On" (US Pop #87, US R&B #12)
- "I Only Want to Be with You" (UK #36)
- "There It Is" (US R&B #54)

== Charts ==
=== Weekly charts ===
Chart (1994–1995)	Peak position
Australian Albums (ARIA)	190
Canadian Albums (RPM)	29
Dutch Albums (Album Top 100)	40
German Albums (Offizielle Top 100)	91
UK Albums (Official Charts)	44
US Billboard 200	20
US Top R&B/Hip-Hop Albums (Billboard)	1

=== Year-end charts ===
Chart (1994)	Position
US Top R&B/Hip-Hop Albums (Billboard)	39
Chart (1995)	Position
US Billboard 200	60
US Top R&B/Hip-Hop Albums (Billboard)	7

== Certifications ==
Region	Certification	Certified units/sales
Canada (Music Canada)	Gold	50,000^{^}
United States (RIAA)	2× Platinum	2,000,000^{^}
^{^} Shipments figures based on certification alone.

== See also ==
- List of Billboard number-one R&B albums of 1994
