= I've Got So Much to Give =

- French release picture sleeve

Single by Barry White

from the album I've Got So Much to Give
- A-side: "I'm Gonna Love You Just a Little More Baby" (Greece/Germany/US reissue) "Bring Back My Yesterday" (Netherlands)
- B-side: "I've Got So Much to Give" (Instrumental) (US/Canada)
- Released: July 1973
- Genre: R&B, soul
- Length: 5:15 (single version) 8:16 (album version)
- Label: 20th Century
- Songwriter(s): Barry White

Barry White singles chronology
"I'm Gonna Love You Just a Little More Baby" (1973)	"I've Got So Much to Give" (1973)	"Never, Never Gonna Give Ya Up" (1973)

"I've Got So Much to Give" is an R&B contemporary romantic ballad composed and recorded by popular soul artist Barry White and released in 1973. It was originally conceived by White as a single but then featured on the album of the same name (released in 1973), that peaked at number one on the Hot R&B Albums Chart.

== Composition ==
Barry White composed and arranged both the instrumentals and the vocals. The song begins with a brief instrumental solo performed by The Love Unlimited Orchestra, the instrumentals are repeated while White speaks romantic words to his apparent love interest, this style is also used in his version of "Just the Way You Are".

== Influence and reception ==
The romantic lyrics used in the song helped craft White's sexual persona, and his orchestral combination of instruments in an R&B song. The song is often used in romantic novels and films. In a play written by Mark Frank (included in the book A Collection of Plays Written by Mark Frank), one of the main protagonist transforms himself into Barry White and performs the song.

== Credits ==
- Arrangements by Gene Page and Barry White
- Composition and vocals by Barry White
- Instrumentals and background vocals performed by The Love Unlimited Orchestra

== Chart performance ==
The song peaked at number 32 on the Billboard Hot 100 chart and charted for 11 weeks. It also reached number five on the US Billboard R&B chart and number 46 on the US Adult Contemporary chart.
