= Glodean White =

American singer

- Born: Glodean Beverly James; October 16, 1947 (age 79); Los Angeles, California, U.S.
- Other name: Glodean James
- Occupation: Singer
- Years active: 1969–present
- Known for: Barry & Glodean; Love Unlimited
- Spouse: Barry White (m. 1974; died 2003)
- Children: 4

Glodean Beverly White (born Glodean Beverly James, October 16, 1947) is an American R&B singer, who was married to Barry White. In the 1980s, Glodean White made numerous appearances on Soul Train and the Soul Train Music Awards. She was the lead singer of the singing trio Love Unlimited. She was also known for extremely long fingernails.

== Personal life ==
In 1974, she married Barry White. They had four children together and collaborated on the 1981 album Barry & Glodean. The couple had been separated many years prior to his death in 2003 but they never divorced.

== Discography ==
With Love Unlimited

- From a Girl's Point of View We Give to You... Love Unlimited (1972)
- Under the Influence of... Love Unlimited (1973)
- In Heat (1974)
- He's All I've Got (1977)
- Love Is Back (1979)

With Barry White

- Barry & Glodean (1981)

With Linda James

- A Romantic Evening For The Holidays With Glodean & Linda (2020)
