= Dedication (Bay City Rollers song) =

Single by Bay City Rollers

from the album Dedication
- Released: 1976
- Length: 3:54 (Album version); 3:44 (US single)
- Label: Arista
- Songwriters: Guy Fletcher; Doug Flett
- Producer: Jimmy Ienner

Bay City Rollers singles chronology
"Yesterday's Hero" (1976)	"Dedication" (1976)	"Don't Worry Baby" (1976)

"Dedication" is a single released by Scottish band, the Bay City Rollers, released in 1976 from the album of the same name. Written by Guy Fletcher and Doug Flett, it was released via Arista Records, the label which subsumed their previous record label, Bell Records, and was released exclusively in the United States, Canada and Japan.

== Background and recording ==
Initially, band member Ian Mitchell recorded the lead vocals for the song during the album recording sessions; however, it was later re-recorded by lead singer Les McKeown for inclusion on the album, and was the version which was subsequently released as a single. McKeown re-recorded the vocals for "Dedication" following Mitchell's decision to the leave the band. The song, along with "Yesterday's Hero", was considered to be the only "strong" songs on the Dedication album, and was considered the "obvious choice" for a single release in the market in North America. Band member Derek Longmuir said that during the time of the singles release, the band had "set its sights on success in the American music market".

The songs composition is described as a "Slade type stomp" in which Stuart Wood and Les McKeown shared lead vocals. Despite impressive songwriting credentials of the songs writers, Guy Fletcher and Doug Flett, who had previously written lyrics for artists including Elvis, Ray Charles and Cliff Richard, band member Eric Faulkner was left impressed with the song as a result of the band wishing to "write more of their own material".

== Commercial performance ==
On 12 February 1977, "Dedication" debuted at number on the US Billboard Hot 100 singles chart, spending a combined total of seven weeks on the chart after reaching a peak position of number sixty. In Canada, it reached a peak of number sixty-nine on the Canadian Singles Chart.

== Track listings ==
=== US 7" single ===
1. "Dedication" – 3:44
2. "Rock N' Roll Letter" – 3:34

=== Japan 7" single ===
1. "Dedication" – 3:53
2. "You're A Woman" – 4:10

== Charts ==
Chart (1977)	Peak position
US Billboard Hot 100 (Billboard)	60
Canada Top Singles (RPM)	69
