= Change (Barry White album) =

Studio album by Barry White
- Released: July 1982
- Recorded: 1982
- Genre: Soul, R&B, disco, funk
- Length: 45:25
- Label: Unlimited Gold
- Producer: Barry White

Barry White chronology
Beware! (1981)	Change (1982)	Dedicated (1983)

Singles from Change
- 1. "Change" Released: July 1982; 2. "Passion" Released: Nov 1982

Change is Barry White's fourteenth studio album.

== History ==
After steadily declining commercial success with his Unlimited Gold-label, he experimented with a more synthesized R&B sound on the new album. The title track saw him hit #12 on the R&B charts, his first Top 20-placing in 4 years in the US. The second single "Passion" stalled at #65. A slimmed down Barry White performed "Change" and "I've Got the Love Fever" at Soul Train where White told host Don Cornelius that the album was "devoted to young people in America." The album saw him return to the Billboard charts for the first time in two years, peaking #148, and reaching #20 on the R&B charts.

== CD reissues ==
The album was released on CD for the first time in 1993. In 1996, Japan re-issued the album on a gatefold miniature LP-replica compact disc.

== Track listing ==
1. "Change" (Barry White, Carl Taylor, John López) - 6:12
2. "Turnin' On, Tunin' In (To Your Love)" (Vella Maria Cameron) - 5:13
3. "Let's Make Tonight (An Evening to Remember)" (Jasper & Vella Cameron) - 5:09
4. "Don't Tell Me About Heartaches" (John Vallins, Nat Kipner) - 6:52
5. "Passion" (White, Taylor, López) - 6:58
6. "I've Got That Love Fever" (Barry White, Jack Perry, Vella Cameron) - 5:11
7. "I Like You, You Like Me" (White, Perry) - 5:30
8. "It's All About Love" (Vella & Jasper Cameron) - 4:20

== Singles ==
- "Change" (4:22) / "I Like You, You Like Me" (4:30) (Unlimited Gold, ZS5 02956)
- "Passion" (3:40) / "It's All About Love" (4:00) (Unlimited Gold, ZS4 03379)

Year	Single	
Year	Single	US R&B
1982	"Change"	12
1982	"Passion"	65
