= Practice What You Preach (song) =

1994 single by Barry White

Single by Barry White

from the album The Icon Is Love
- B-side: "Love Is the Icon"; "Super Lover"
- Released: 1994
- Genre: R&B
- Length: 5:59 (album version); 4:02 (single version)
- Label: A&M
- Songwriters: Barry White; Gerald Levert; Edwin Nicholas
- Producers: Barry White; Tony Nicholas; Gerald Levert

Barry White singles chronology
"Dark and Lovely (You Over There)" (1992)	"Practice What You Preach" (1994)	"Come On" (1995)

Music video
- "Practice What You Preach" on YouTube

"Practice What You Preach" is a song by American singer-songwriter Barry White, released in 1994 by A&M Records as the first single from the singer's nineteenth studio album, The Icon Is Love (1994). The song was written by White, Gerald Levert and Edwin Nicholas. It spent three weeks at number-one on the US Billboard Hot R&B/Hip-Hop Songs chart and reached numbers 19 and 18 on the Cash Box Top 100 and Billboard Hot 100. The song became a gold record and also won a Soul Train Music Award for Best R&B/Soul Song of the Year. The accompanying music video was directed by Randee St. Nicholas.

== Critical reception ==
Upon the release, Larry Flick from Billboard magazine wrote, "White sure hasn't lost his seductive touch—as proven vividly on this shimmering ballad from his new set, The Icon Is Love. He sings with tingling force, framing the track with his signature love talk. Collaborators Gerald Levert and Tony Nicholas keep the music contemporary and primed for instant R&B radio approval. We'd love to see some of today's young turks "freak" with this kind of sex appeal." Pan-European magazine Music & Media stated, "'Nuff said, now it's time to shake some action, demands the high priest of midnight love. As always, he dims the lights and puts on his most sensual coffee-brown voice. Hallelujah, play him!"

== Charts ==
=== Weekly charts ===
Chart (1994–1995)	Peak position
Brazil (UPI)	6
Canada Top Singles (RPM)	31
Netherlands (Single Top 100)	36
UK Singles (Official Charts)	20
US Billboard Hot 100	18
US Hot R&B/Hip-Hop Songs (Billboard)	1
US Maxi-Singles Sales (Billboard)	33
US Rhythmic Airplay (Billboard)	21
US Cash Box Top 100	19

=== Year-end charts ===
Chart (1994)	Position
US Hot R&B/Hip-Hop Songs (Billboard)	48

Chart (1995)	Position
US Hot R&B/Hip-Hop Songs (Billboard)	20

== See also ==
- List of number-one R&B singles of 1994 (U.S.)
