= I've Got So Much to Give (album) =

Studio album by Barry White
- Released: March 27, 1973
- Recorded: November 1972 – January 1973
- Genre: R&B, soul
- Length: 36:03
- Label: 20th Century
- Producer: Barry White

Barry White chronology
I've Got So Much to Give (1973)	Stone Gon' (1973)

Singles from I've Got So Much to Give
- 1. "I'm Gonna Love You Just a Little More Baby" Released: April 1973; 2. "I've Got So Much to Give" Released: July 1973

I've Got So Much to Give is the debut studio album by American R&B singer Barry White, released on March 27, 1973, on the 20th Century label.

== History ==
The album topped the R&B albums chart. It also reached number 16 on the Billboard 200. The album was a success, yielding two Billboard R&B top-ten singles, "I'm Gonna Love You Just a Little More Baby", which peaked at number 1, and the title track. Both were also successful on the Billboard Hot 100, peaking at numbers 3 and 32 respectively. "I'm Gonna Love You Just a Little More Baby" was also a hit on the UK Singles Chart, peaking at number 23. The album was digitally remastered and reissued on CD with instrumental bonus tracks on May 4, 2010, by Hip-O Select.

== Critical reception ==
Professional ratings
Review scores
Source	Rating
AllMusic	3.5/5 stars
Christgau's Record Guide	B

Stephen Erlewine of AllMusic wrote: "In a sense, his sound is fully formed—there’s no mistaking his velvet baritone or his lush, string-draped surrounding, particularly on the album's closing 'I'm Gonna Love You Just a Little More, Baby', a song so seductive it set the pace for the rest of his career". The Village Voice critic Robert Christgau wrote, "White's hustle is to combine Isaac Hayes's power with Al Green's niceness, and he succeeds, in his way, but the synthesis has its drawbacks—tends to compound his humorlessness and mendacity as well."

== Track listing ==
All tracks are written by Barry White, except where noted.

Side one
No.	Title	Writer(s)	Length
1.	"Standing in the Shadows of Love"	Brian Holland, Lamont Dozier, Eddie Holland	8:00
2.	"Bring Back My Yesterday"	Barry White, Bob Relf	6:40

Side two
No.	Title	Length
3.	"I've Found Someone"	5:55
4.	"I've Got So Much to Give"	8:11
5.	"I'm Gonna Love You Just a Little More Baby"	7:20

2010 remastered bonus tracks
No.	Title	Length
6.	"I'm Gonna Love You Just a Little More Baby" (Instrumental)	4:16
7.	"I've Got So Much to Give" (Instrumental)	5:17

== Personnel ==
- Barry White – lead vocals, arranger, design concept
- Gene Page – arranger

Technical

- Frank Kejmar – engineer
- Ken Veeder – photography

== Charts ==
=== Weekly charts ===
Chart performance for I've Got So Much to Give
Chart (1973)	Peak position
Australian Albums (Kent Music Report)	39
Canada Top Albums/CDs (RPM)	64
US Billboard 200	16
US Top R&B/Hip-Hop Albums (Billboard)	1

=== Singles ===
Chart performance for singles from I've Got So Much to Give
Year	Single	Peak chart positions		
Year	Single	US	US R&B	UK
1973	"I'm Gonna Love You Just a Little More Baby"	3	1	23
1973	"I've Got So Much to Give"	32	5	—

== Certifications and sales ==
Certifications and sales for I've Got So Much to Give
Region	Certification	Certified units/sales
United States (RIAA)	Gold	500,000^{^}
^{^} Shipments figures based on certification alone.

== See also ==
- List of Billboard number-one R&B albums of 1973
