= The Right Night & Barry White =

Studio album by Barry White
- Released: September 24, 1987
- Recorded: 1986–1987
- Genre: R&B, soul
- Length: 69:11
- Label: A&M/PolyGram; 215 154
- Producer: Barry White

Barry White chronology
Dedicated (1983)	The Right Night & Barry White (1987)	The Collection (1988)

Professional ratings
Review scores
Source	Rating
AllMusic	2/5 stars
High Fidelity	(favourable)
Smash Hits	8.75/10

The Right Night & Barry White is the self-produced sixteenth album by American R&B singer Barry White, which was released in 1987 on A&M Records. The album peaked at No. 28 on the Billboard Top R&B Albums chart.

== Track listings ==
1. "Good Dancin' Music" (Barry White, Jack Perry) – 7:05
2. "As Time Goes By" (Herman Hupfeld) – 5:51
3. "Sho' You Right" (White, Perry) – 7:43
4. "For Your Love (I'll Do Most Anything)" (White, Bryan Loren) – 6:23
5. "There's a Place (Where Love Never Ends)" (White, Frieda Brock, Doug Lambert) – 7:25
6. "Love Is in Your Eyes" (White, Perry, Don Williams) – 7:22
7. "I'm Ready for Love" (White, Lambert, Edward R. Martinez) – 5:09
8. "Share" (White, Charles Fearing) – 7:05
9. "Who's the Fool" (White, Perry, Eugene Booker) – 6:36
10. "The Right Night" (White) – 6:32

=== LP & cassette ===
1. "Sho' You Right" (White, Perry) – 7:43
2. "For Your Love (I'll Do Most Anything)" (White, Bryan Loren) – 4:24
3. "There's a Place (Where Love Never Ends)" (White, Frieda Brock, Doug Lambert) – 5:32
4. "Love Is in Your Eyes" (White, Perry, Don Williams) – 5:55
5. "Theme" - 0:33
6. "The Right Night" (White) – 5:50
7. "I'm Ready for Love" (White, Lambert, Edward R. Martinez) – 5:11
8. "Theme" - 0:32
9. "Share" (White, Charles Fearing) – 7:05
10. "Who's the Fool" (White, Perry, Eugene Booker) – 6:36

== Singles ==
- "Sho' You Right" (US R&B No. 17, UK No. 14)
- "For Your Love (I'll Do Most Anything)" (US R&B No. 27, UK No. 94)

== Personnel ==
- Barry White – lead vocals, keyboards, bass, drums, percussion
- Eugene Booker, Doug Lambert, Bryan Loren, Jack Perry – keyboards
- Melvin "Wah Wah" Watson – guitars, backing vocals
- Nathan East – bass
- Al Chalk – percussion
- Thomas Alvarado – tenor saxophone
- James Bailey, Kenny Harris, Stephanie Haynes, Brenda Holloway, Cheryl James, Diane Taylor, Sharon-Lyn Rochelle, Kathy Thompson, Glodean White – backing vocals
- Strings arranged by Gene Page

== Charts ==
Chart performance for The Right Night & Barry White
Chart (1987)	Peak position
New Zealand Albums (RMNZ)	45
UK Albums (OCC)	74
US Billboard 200	159
US Top R&B/Hip-Hop Albums (Billboard)	28

== Certifications and sales ==
Region	Certification	Certified units/sales
France (SNEP)	2× Gold	200,000^{*}
^{*} Sales figures based on certification alone.
