= The Man Is Back! =

Studio album by Barry White
- Released: August 24, 1989
- Genre: R&B
- Length: 53:21
- Label: A&M; PolyGram 215 256
- Producer: Barry White

Barry White chronology
The Collection (1988)	The Man Is Back! (1989)	Put Me in Your Mix (1991)

Professional ratings
Review scores
Source	Rating
AllMusic	link
Select	2/5 medals

The Man Is Back! is the self-produced seventeenth album by American R&B singer Barry White, released in 1989 on A&M Records. The first album of White's comeback phase, the album featured White incorporating a more contemporary production style while retaining the essential elements of his trademark sound, but the album was only a moderate seller, peaking at No. 22 on the R&B chart, only slightly higher than the disappointing showing of his A&M debut, The Right Night & Barry White. Critical reaction is generally positive, with the album being classed as a worthwhile and enjoyable, if not groundbreaking, addition to White's catalogue.

== Track listing ==
1. "Responsible" (Barry White, Julian Jackson, Jack Perry) - 4:41
2. "Super Lover" (White, Perry, William Jones) - 4:52
3. "L.A. My Kinda Place" (White) - 4:50
4. "Follow That and See (Where It Leads Y'All)" (White) - 5:04
5. "When Will I See You Again" (White, Terrence Thomas) - 5:51
6. "I Wanna Do It Good to Ya" (White, Rusty Hamilton III) - 6:00
7. "It's Getting Harder All the Time" (Aaron Schroeder, David Grover) - 5:09
8. "Don't Let Go" (White, Thomas, Chuckii Booker) - 9:08
9. "Love's Interlude/Good Night My Love" (White) - 7:46

== Charts ==
=== Weekly charts ===
Chart (1989–1990)	Peak position
US Billboard 200	143
US Top R&B/Hip-Hop Albums (Billboard)	22

=== Year-end charts ===
Chart (1990)	Position
US Top R&B/Hip-Hop Albums (Billboard)	31

== Singles ==
- "Super Lover" (US R&B No. 34)
- "I Wanna Do It Good to Ya" (US R&B No. 26)
- "When Will I See You Again" (US R&B No. 32)
