= In Heat (Love Unlimited album) =

Studio album by Love Unlimited
- Released: 1974
- Recorded: 1973–1974
- Genre: Soul, funk, R&B
- Length: 29:07
- Label: 20th Century Records
- Producer: Barry White

Love Unlimited chronology
Under the Influence Of (1973)	In Heat (1974)	He's All I've Got (1977)

Professional ratings
Review scores
Source	Rating
Allmusic	4.5/5 stars
Christgau's Record Guide	B+

In Heat is the third studio album by Love Unlimited. Released in 1974, the album charted at number 15 on the U.S. R&B charts. The single, "I Belong To You", was a number-one hit on the U.S. R&B charts in 1975.

== Track listing ==
All tracks composed by Barry White; except where indicated

1. "Move Me No Mountain" - (Jerry Ragovoy, Aaron Schroeder) 3:55
2. "Share a Little Love in Your Heart" - 5:53
3. "Oh I Should Say, It's Such a Beautiful Day" - 3:30
4. "I Needed Love - You Were There" - 3:47
5. "I Belong to You" - 5:07
6. "I Love You So, Never Gonna Let You Go" - 3:20
7. "Love's Theme" - (music by Barry White, lyrics by Aaron Schroeder) 3:59

== Charts ==
Chart (1974)	Peak position
Billboard Pop Albums	85
Billboard Top Soul Albums	15

=== Singles ===
Year	Single	Chart positions	
Year	Single	US Pop	US R&B
1975	"I Belong To You"	27	1
1975	"Share A Little Love In Your Heart"	-	21
