= Beware! (Barry White album) =

Studio album by Barry White
- Released: 1981
- Genre: Funk, soul
- Length: 44:34
- Label: Unlimited Gold
- Producer: Barry White

Barry White chronology
| Barry & Glodean (1981) | Beware! (1981) | Change (1982) |

Singles from Beware
- 1. "Louie, Louis" Released: August 1981; 2. "Beware" Released: November 1981

Professional ratings
Review scores
| Source | Rating |
|---|---|
| AllMusic | 2.5/5 stars |
| The Virgin Encyclopedia of Seventies Music | 2/5 stars |

Beware! is a studio album by the American musician Barry White, released in 1981. Produced by White, it was the fourth release on his own CBS-affiliated custom label, Unlimited Gold. Peaking at No. 40 on the R&B chart, it fared better than his previous duet album with his wife which had failed to chart at all. It was preceded by the first single, a cover of Richard Berry's "Louie Louie", originally released in 1957. White performed it on Soul Train on September 19, 1981, but it failed to chart. The second single, the title track of the album, was also a cover version from the 1950s, originally written by Jo Ann Belvin for her husband Jesse Belvin shortly before they were both killed in a motor accident in 1960. "Beware" reached No. 49 on the R&B charts. As with his previous album, White's UK label did not release any singles from the album.

== Track listing ==
1. "Beware" (Jo Ann Belvin) - 5:50
2. "Relax to the Max" (Barry White, Lowrell Simon) - 3:42
3. "Let Me In and Let's Begin with Love" (Barry White, Vella M. Cameron) - 6:02
4. "Your Love, Your Love" (Barry White, Lowrell Simon) - 4:22
5. "Tell Me Who Do You Love" (Barry White, Darnell White) - 2:06
6. "Rio De Janeiro" (Barry White, Carol P. Jackson, Marlon Jackson) - 4:25
7. "You're My High" (Barry White, Nathan East) - 2:14
8. "Oooo...Ahhh..." (Barry White, Fleming Williams, Jakki Miligan) - 3:58
9. "I Won't Settle Less Than the Best (For You Baby)" (Barry White, Vella M. Cameron) - 4:20
10. "Louie Louie" (Richard Berry) - 7:14

== Singles ==
| Year | Single | |
| Year | Single | US R&B |
|---|---|---|
| 1981 | "Louie, Louie" | — |
| 1981 | "Beware" | 49 |
