= Love's Theme =

1973 single by the Love Unlimited Orchestra

- Side A of the New Zealand single

Single by the Love Unlimited Orchestra

from the album Under the Influence of... Love Unlimited and Rhapsody in White
- B-side: "Sweet Moments"
- Released: November 1973
- Recorded: 1973
- Studio: Whitney Recording Studios (Glendale, CA)
- Genre: Philly soul; proto-disco
- Length: 3:30 (single); 4:08 (album)
- Label: 20th Century/Pye International
- Songwriter: Barry White
- Producer: Barry White

The Love Unlimited Orchestra singles chronology
"Love's Theme" (1973)	"Rhapsody in White" (1974)

Music video
- Love Unlimited Orchestra – Love's Theme (live at TopPop) on YouTube

"Love's Theme" is an instrumental piece written by Barry White in 1965 but recorded and released as a single by White's Love Unlimited Orchestra in late 1973. It was one of the few instrumental and purely orchestral singles to reach #1 on the Billboard Hot 100 chart in the United States, which it did in early 1974. Billboard ranked it as #3 on the Year-End Hot 100 singles of 1974. Over the years, "Love’s Theme" became one of the best-selling pop instrumentals of all time.

== Background and release ==
The song was included on two albums: 1973's Under the Influence of... Love Unlimited (by the vocal group Love Unlimited) and 1974's Rhapsody in White by the Love Unlimited Orchestra. Love Unlimited would re-release the song for their subsequent album, In Heat (1974), only this time with different orchestral arrangements and lyrics written by Aaron Schroeder.

The recording (with a large string orchestra, modified guitar and big rhythm section) is considered to be an influence on the disco sound, which would increase in popularity the following year. The song was also popular on the Adult Contemporary chart in the United States, spending two weeks at #1, and was also a #1 on the Cash Box chart. For several years, a shortened version of the original instrumental release was used in the opening sequence of the television golf PGA Tour on ABC broadcasting program.

In Canada, the single was similarly successful, being a #1 on the RPM 100 National Singles Chart on March 2, 1974. "Love's Theme" was sampled by the Italian group Black Box in their 1989 song "Ride on Time".

== Legacy ==
In 1975–76, WPIX-TV in New York would end its 10:00pm broadcast of Harper News (later Action News) with "Love's Theme". It was also used as the boarding music for Cathay Pacific during the 1980s and as the theme song of the Brazilian soap opera Celebridade.

The melody was also used by Orchestral Manoeuvres in the Dark for their 1993 single "Dream of Me (Based on Love's Theme)".

Since 2000, it has been the theme song for the Italian talk show C'è posta per te, on air on Canale 5. The 2024 PBS series Disco: Soundtrack of a Revolution explores the importance of "Love's Theme" to the history of disco music.

== Charts and certifications ==
=== Weekly charts ===
The Love Unlimited Orchestra
Chart (1973–1974)	Peak position
Argentina	8
Australia (Kent Music Report)	9
Belgium (Ultratop 50 Flanders)	7
Canada Top Singles (RPM)	1
Canada Adult Contemporary (RPM)	5
Netherlands (Single Top 100)	7
New Zealand (Listener)	12
South Africa (Springbok Radio)	1
UK Singles (Official Charts)	10
US Billboard Hot 100	1
US Easy Listening (Billboard)	1
US Hot Soul Singles (Billboard)	10

Andy Williams
Chart (1974)	Peak position
US Adult Contemporary (Billboard)	16

=== Year-end charts ===
Chart (1974)	Rank
Australia (Kent Music Report)	66
Canada	25
South Africa	10
US Billboard Easy Listening	6
US Billboard Hot 100	3

=== Certifications ===
Region	Certification	Certified units/sales
United States (RIAA)	Gold	1,000,000^{^}
^{^} Shipments figures based on certification alone.

== See also ==
- List of Hot 100 number-one singles of 1974 (U.S.)
- List of number-one adult contemporary singles of 1974 (U.S.)
- List of RPM number-one singles of 1974 (Canada)
