= The Message Is Love =

Studio album by Barry White
- Released: March 1979
- Recorded: 1979
- Genre: Disco, soul, R&B
- Length: 35:53
- Label: Unlimited Gold
- Producer: Barry White

Barry White chronology
The Man (1978)	The Message Is Love (1979)	I Love to Sing the Songs I Sing (1979)

Singles from The Message Is Love
- 1. "Any Fool Could See (You Were Meant For Me)" Released: March 1979; 2. "It Ain't Love Babe (Until You Give It)" Released: June 1979; 3. "Love Ain't Easy" Released: January 1980

Professional ratings
Review scores
Source	Rating
AllMusic	3/5 stars
The Virgin Encyclopedia of R&B and Soul	3/5 stars

The Message Is Love is the self-produced tenth album by American R&B singer Barry White, released in March 1979. It was White's first release on his own CBS-affiliated custom label, Unlimited Gold, following his departure from long-time label 20th Century-Fox Records, and advance interest was high. The album however proved a disappointment both critically and commercially. However, the album was still certified RIAA Gold. The Message Is Love stalled outside the R&B album top 10 (peaking at number 14) and only reached number 67 on the Billboard 200. The poor performance of the album set the pattern for White's career slump in the early 1980s, which saw him fail to place any other album on the Billboard Hot 100 during the decade.

== Track listing ==
- Tracks written by Barry White and Paul Politi unless stated
1. "It Ain't Love, Babe (Until You Give It)" – 4:22
2. "Hung Up in Your Love" – 4:11
3. "You're the One I Need" (Barry White, Smead Hudman) – 4:23
4. "Any Fool Could See (You Were Meant for Me)" – 4:45
5. "Love Ain't Easy" – 5:36
6. "I'm on Fire" (Robert Jason) – 5:39
7. "I Found Love" – 6:57

== Charts ==
=== Album ===
Chart performance for The Message Is Love
Chart (1979)	Peak position
US Billboard 200	67
US Top R&B/Hip-Hop Albums (Billboard)	14

=== Singles ===
Chart performance for singles from The Message Is Love
Year	Single	
Year	Single	US R&B
1979	"Any Fool Could See (You Were Meant for Me)"	37
1979	"It Ain't Love Babe (Until You Give It)"	58
1980	"Love Ain't Easy"	75

== Certifications and sales ==
Certifications and sales for The Message Is Love
Region	Certification	Certified units/sales
United States (RIAA)	Gold	500,000^{^}
^{^} Shipments figures based on certification alone.
