= Love Unlimited (Love Unlimited album) =

Studio album by Love Unlimited
- Released: 1972
- Recorded: 1971–1972
- Genre: Soul
- Length: 36:18
- Label: Uni/MCA
- Producer: Barry White

Love Unlimited chronology
Love Unlimited (1972)	Under the Influence Of (1973)

Alternative cover
- Artwork for early pressing

Professional ratings
Review scores
Source	Rating
Allmusic	4.5/5 stars
Q	4/5 stars

From a Girl's Point of View We Give to You... Love Unlimited is the debut studio album of American soul vocal trio Love Unlimited, released in 1972 on Uni/MCA Records. Produced by soul recording artist Barry White, for whom the trio served as a backing group at the time, the album was arranged by White and conductor Gene Page. It was digitally remastered by recording engineer Bill Inglot and reissued on May 10, 1994 by Varèse Vintage.

== Background ==
Love Unlimited was made up of Diane Taylor and sisters Glodean and Linda James. Glodean originally met recording artist and future husband Barry White through a mutual friend. She was a fan of Viola Wills' single "Lost Without the Love of My Guy", a song co-written and arranged by White. White rehearsed for almost a year with the trio, who had not done any professional singing before, and came up with their stage name, Love Unlimited. White wrote "Walkin' in the Rain With the One I Love" with lyrics that were inspired by conversations with Glodean; the two engage in "phoned"-in dialogue on the song. White's business partner Larry Nunes took the record to record executive and Uni Records-head Russ Regan.

== Reception ==
The album charted at number 151 on the US Billboard 200 chart and produced the hit single "Walkin' in the Rain with the One I Love", which reached number 14 on the Billboard Hot 100 and number six on the Soul Singles chart. The single was certified gold by the Recording Industry Association of America on July 24, 1972, for shipments of 1,000,000 copies in the United States. The single's success helped the album sell one million copies.

Love Unlimited was well received by contemporary music critics. Allmusic writer John Bush gave it four-and-a-half out of five stars called it "a cohesive album-length meditation on the highs and lows of love, delivered by a satiny girl group trio pillowed in one of the warmest production surroundings yet heard on a pop album". Bush complimented its suite-like concept and praised Barry White's production and songwriting for the album, stating "White's arrangements are reminiscent of the mid-'60s Holland-Dozier-Holland sound, but with all the icy edges melted off and the driving drumwork coaxed into a mid-tempo crawl". Q gave the album four out of five stars and described the trio as "the logical conclusion of the female soul sound", commenting that "the romantic melody achieved a giant stateliness designed to be a feminine version of the Barry White sound".

== Track listing ==
- All tracks produced by Barry White, arranged by White and Gene Page.

No.	Title	Writer(s)	Length
1.	"I Should Have Known"	Barry White, Robert Relf	4:54
2.	"Another Chance"	White, Tom Brocker	2:51
3.	"Are You Sure"	Linda James, Diane Taylor, Glodean James	3:16
4.	"Fragile - Handle with Care"	White	4:02
5.	"Is It Really True Boy - Is It Really Me"	White	4:00
6.	"I'll Be Yours Forever More"	White	3:43
7.	"If This World Were Mine"	Marvin Gaye	5:32
8.	"Together"	Kenneth Gamble, Leon Huff	3:10
9.	"Walkin' in the Rain with the One I Love"	White	4:44

== Personnel ==
- Love Unlimited – vocals
  - Glodean James
  - Linda James
  - Diane Taylor
- Barry White – arrangements, producer
- Gene Page – arrangements
