= It May Be Winter Outside (But in My Heart It's Spring) =

Single by Felice Taylor
- Released: 1966
- Genre: Soul
- Label: Mustang, President
- Songwriter(s): Barry White, Paul Politi

"It May Be Winter Outside (But in My Heart It's Spring)" is a song co-written by the songwriters and record producers, Barry White and Paul Politi. It became a minor hit for American singer Felice Taylor in 1967, reaching No. 42 on the Billboard Hot 100 and No. 44 on the R&B chart in early 1967.

== Covers ==
It was recorded later in 1973 by Love Unlimited, a girl group formed through Barry White's initiative. It appeared on the female group's album Under the Influence of... Love Unlimited. This version made it to No. 83 on the Billboard Hot 100 and No. 35 on the Billboard R&B chart. It was a bigger success in the United Kingdom, reaching No. 11 on the UK Singles Chart. The single version, lasting just over three minutes, is edited from the full track which has a duration of almost four and a quarter minutes. The single omits part of the introduction and an instrumental section which appears on the longer version before the third verse.

The song was also covered by the British group Steps, on their tour Christmas with Steps in 2012, under the shorter title "It May Be Winter Outside".

== Sampling ==
Buckshot and 9th Wonder sampled the version by Love Unlimited in the track "Intro - The Formula", on the album The Formula released in 2008.
