= I'm Gonna Love You Just a Little More Baby =

- Side A of the New Zealand single

Single by Barry White

from the album I've Got So Much to Give
- B-side: "Just a Little More Baby" "Standing in the Shadows of Love" (France) "I've Got So Much to Give" (Germany)
- Released: April 1973
- Genre: Soul; R&B
- Length: 3:58 (single edit); 7:11 (album version)
- Label: 20th Century Records
- Songwriter: Barry White
- Producer: Barry White

Barry White singles chronology
"I'm Gonna Love You Just a Little More Baby" (1973)	"I've Got So Much to Give" (1973)

"I'm Gonna Love You Just a Little More Baby" is a song written, produced and recorded by Barry White. It was also released as his debut single.

Released in the spring of 1973 as the first single from his 1973 debut album I've Got So Much to Give, the song was a No.1 hit on the US R&B chart for two weeks, peaked at No.3 on the Billboard Pop Singles chart and reached No.23 on the UK Singles Chart. The single was also certified gold by the RIAA for sales of one million copies.

== Background ==
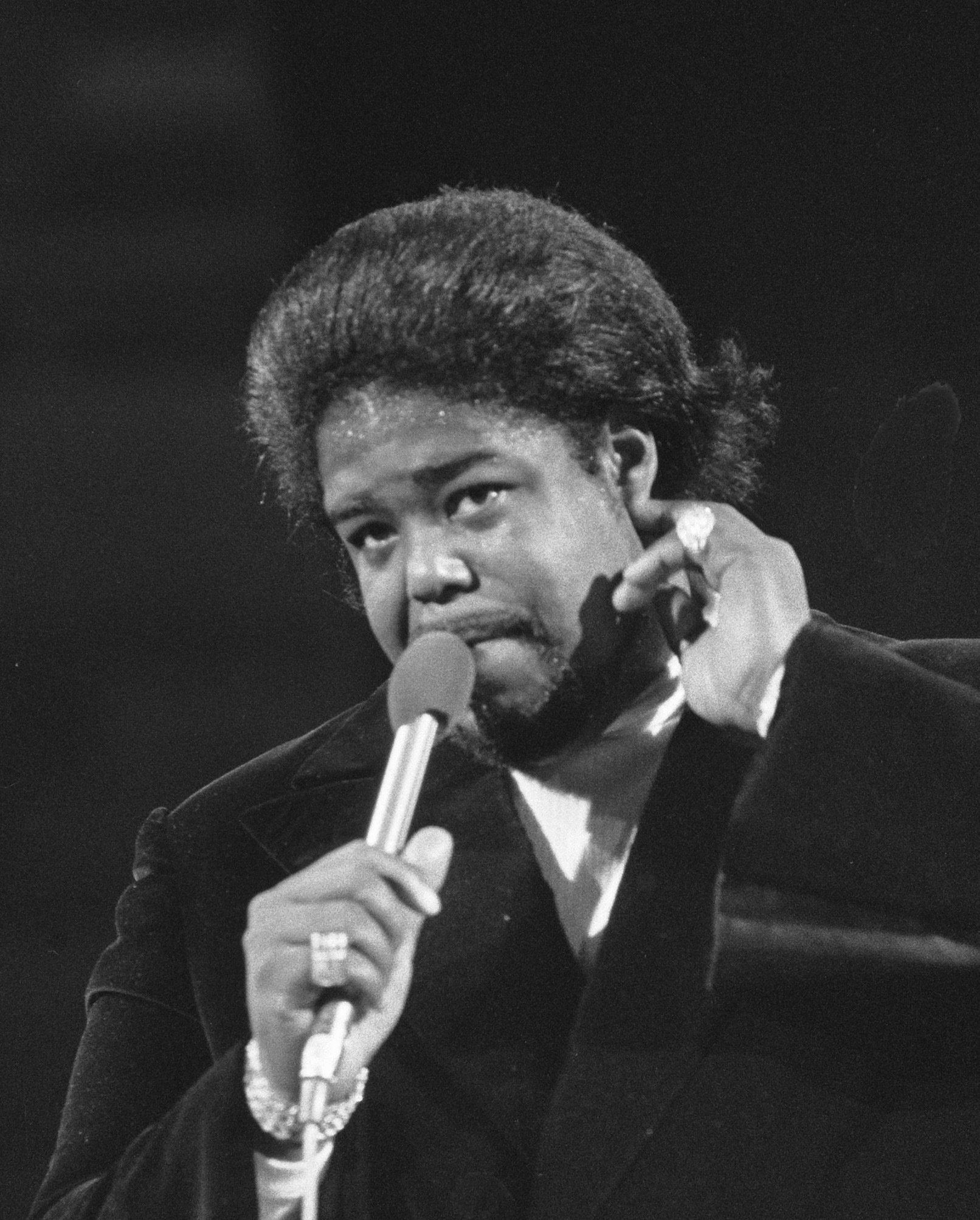
Barry White in 1974

White recorded three song demos of himself singing and playing the piano, and he told his business partner Larry Nunes about the song, who convinced White to re-record and release it. Appearing with White on the recording session for the song were guitarists Ray Parker Jr., Wah Wah Watson, Dean Parks, and David T. Walker; drummer Ed Greene; bassists Wilton Felder and Nathan East; and vibes player Gary Coleman.

== Reception ==
The single earned the gold certification (1,000,000 units sold) from the Recording Industry Association of America on June 6, 1973. Food writer Adrian Miller in his 2013 book Soul Food declared the song as his "personal choice" of songs by Barry White whenever a hot sauce, which Miller said "is about seduction", would come to mind.

== Usage in the media ==
The song was used in the 2000 Film Adaptation of High Fidelity.

In 2020, Summer Walker recorded a cover of the song for Birds of Prey. Additionally, the Barry White version appears in the film. The song also appears in an episode of Friends and has appeared in many films and comedy sketches involving seductive or sexual scenes.

== Charts ==
=== Weekly charts ===
Chart (1973)	Peak position
Australia (Kent Music Report)	26
Canada (RPM)	10
France (SNEP)	37
Netherlands (Dutch Top 40)	21
Netherlands (Single Top 100)	14
New Zealand (Listener)	17
UK Singles (Official Charts)	23
US Billboard Hot 100	3
US Adult Contemporary (Billboard)	27
US Best Selling Soul Singles (Billboard)	1
US Cash Box Top 100	4

=== Year-end charts ===
Chart (1973)	Rank
Australia	182
Canada	97
US Billboard Hot 100	33
US Cash Box	93

== Other versions ==
In 1974, reggae artist Lloyd Charmers released a cover in the UK on Trojan Records' subsidiary label Harry J (catalogue number HJ6662).

In 2009, saxophonist Boney James included it on his album Send One Your Love.

In 2020, American R&B singer Summer Walker recorded the song for the album Birds Of Prey
