= The Love Unlimited Orchestra =

Orchestra formed by Barry White

- Origin: San Pedro, Los Angeles, California, U.S.
- Genres: R&B; soul; funk; disco
- Years active: 1972–1983
- Past members: David T. Walker; Wah Wah Watson (Melvin Ragin); Ray Parker Jr. Nathan East; Wilton Felder; Ernie Watts; Ed Greene; Gene Page; Kenny G Lee Ritenour; Don Peake; John Roberts (Orchestra leader); Emmett North, Jr. Steve Guillory Sr. Stella Castelucci; And Others

The Love Unlimited Orchestra was a 40-piece string-laden orchestra formed by American singer Barry White, and serving as a backing unit for White and for female vocal trio Love Unlimited. From the early 1970s on, they also recorded several singles and albums under their own name.

== Career ==
The orchestra was originally formed in 1972 to back White's female vocal group Love Unlimited for their debut album. The following year they began supporting White for his solo debut, I've Got So Much to Give.

Their biggest hit was 1973's instrumental single "Love's Theme". The track, written by Barry White, went to number 1 for one week in the US and number 10 in the UK. The RIAA awarded a gold disc in February 1974. The hit was included on the orchestra's debut album, Rhapsody in White, issued in 1974.

Two follow-up albums, the soundtrack for the film Together Brothers and White Gold, were released later that year. White Gold featured the single "Satin Soul", which peaked at number 22 on the Billboard pop charts in early 1975. In 1976, Kenny Gorelick, later known as Kenny G, joined the orchestra as a saxophonist. Ray Parker Jr. was also a member in the mid-1970s.

The orchestra continued to record albums for 20th Century Records until the end of the 1970s. By 1981, they had moved to White's own label, Unlimited Gold. Their second album from that year, Welcome Aboard, featured composer and arranger Webster Lewis. Their final album, Rise, was issued in 1983.

== Discography ==
=== Albums ===
Year	Title	Peak chart positions					Certifications	Record label
Year	Title	US	US R&B	AUS	CAN	UK	Certifications	Record label
1974	Rhapsody in White	8	2	26	7	50	RIAA: Gold; BPI: Silver	20th Century
1974	Together Brothers (soundtrack)	96	33	—	—	—		20th Century
1974	White Gold	28	10	93	52	—	RIAA: Gold	20th Century
1975	Music Maestro Please	94	14	—	—	—		20th Century
1976	My Sweet Summer Suite	123	35	—	—	—		20th Century
1978	My Musical Bouquet	—	53	—	—	—		20th Century Fox
1979	Super Movie Themes: Just a Little Bit Different	—	—	—	—	—		20th Century Fox
1981	Let 'Em Dance	—	—	—	—	—		Unlimited Gold
1981	Welcome Aboard	—	—	—	—	—		Unlimited Gold
1983	Rise	—	—	—	—	—		Unlimited Gold
"—" denotes a recording that did not chart or was not released in that territory.

=== Singles ===
Year	Title	Peak chart positions							Certifications	Album
Year	Title	US	US R&B	US A/C	US Dan	AUS	CAN	UK	Certifications	Album
1973	"Love's Theme"	1	10	1	—	9	1	10	RIAA: Gold	Rhapsody in White
1974	"Rhapsody in White"	63	48	—	—	—	63	—		Rhapsody in White
1974	"Theme from Together Brothers"	—	—	—	—	—	—	—		Together Brothers
1974	"Baby Blues"	102	—	—	—	—	—	—		Rhapsody in White
1975	"Satin Soul"	22	23	—	1	—	54	—		White Gold
1975	"Forever in Love"	—	22	—	—	—	—	—		Music Maestro Please
1975	"Midnight Groove"	108	91	—	15	—	—	—		Music Maestro Please
1976	"My Sweet Summer Suite"	48	28	—	1	—	—	—		My Sweet Summer Suite
1976	"Brazilian Love Song"	—	—	—	1	—	—	—		My Sweet Summer Suite
1977	"Theme from King Kong (Part 1)"	68	15	—	7	—	—	—		Super Movie Themes: Just a Little Bit Different
1978	"Hey Look at Me, I'm in Love"	—	—	—	—	—	—	—		My Musical Bouquet
1979	"Theme from Shaft"	—	—	—	—	—	—	—		Super Movie Themes: Just a Little Bit Different
1980	"Young America"	—	—	—	—	—	—	—		Let 'Em Dance
1980	"I Wanna Boogie and Woogie with You"	—	—	—	—	—	—	—		Let 'Em Dance
1981	"Vieni Qua Bella Mi"	—	—	—	—	—	—	—		Let 'Em Dance
1981	"Lift Your Voice and Say (United We Can Live in Peace Today)"	—	—	—	—	—	—	—		Welcome Aboard
1981	"Welcome Aboard"	—	—	—	59	—	—	—		Welcome Aboard
1982	"Night Life in the City"	—	—	—	—	—	—	—		Welcome Aboard
1983	"Do It to the Music... Please"	—	—	—	—	—	—	—		Rise
1983	"My Laboratory (Is Ready for You)"	—	—	—	—	—	—	—		Rise
"—" denotes a recording that did not chart or was not released in that territory.
