= Love Unlimited =

Female vocal trio

- Love Unlimited, c. 1972

Background information
- Origin: San Pedro, California
- Genres: R&B, soul, funk
- Years active: 1969–1981
- Labels: UNI, 20th Century Fox
- Past members: Glodean James; Linda James; Diane Taylor

Love Unlimited was a female vocal trio that provided backing vocals for American singer-songwriter Barry White on his albums and concert tours. They also found success with their own recordings.

== Career ==
Formed in 1969, the group included Barry White's future wife, Glodean James; her sister, Linda James; and their cousin Diane Taylor.

Their first hit was "Walkin' in the Rain with the One I Love" in 1972. It peaked at number 14 on the Billboard Hot 100, number 7 on the Cash Box Top 100, and 6 on the Best Selling Soul Singles Chart. It was also successful in the United Kingdom, peaking at number 14 on the UK Singles Chart. It sold over one million copies, and was awarded a gold disc by the RIAA in July 1972.

In 1973, when their album titled Under the Influence of... Love Unlimited peaked at number 3 on the Billboard Pop Albums chart, Love Unlimited became the first female group to have an album reach the top five since Greatest Hits Vol. 3 from Diana Ross and the Supremes in 1970. The album featured the single "It May Be Winter Outside (But in My Heart It's Spring)" a song originally written by Barry White and Paul Politi for Felice Taylor in 1966. It would peak at number 11 on the UK Singles Chart in early 1975.

In 1975, they had their first and only number one hit, "I Belong to You", which spent a week at the top of the Best Selling Soul Singles Chart. It also peaked at number 27 on the Billboard Hot 100. The song was featured on their third album In Heat which also included a vocal version of "Love's Theme".

In 1977, they were moved to White's own record label Unlimited Gold, recording two further albums He's All I've Got and Love Is Back (1979). The trio disbanded in 1981 after members sought separate careers. Diane Taylor died of cancer in 1985.

== Discography ==
=== Albums ===
Year	Title	Peak chart positions					Certifications	Record label
Year	Title	US	US R&B	AUS	CAN	NL	Certifications	Record label
1972	From a Girl's Point of View We Give to You... Love Unlimited	151	19	—	—	—		UNI
1973	Under the Influence of... Love Unlimited	3	3	18	1	—	RIAA: Gold	20th Century
1974	In Heat	85	15	—	81	—		20th Century
1977	He's All I've Got	192	51	—	—	—		Unlimited Gold
1979	Love Is Back	—	70	—	—	12		Unlimited Gold
"—" denotes a recording that did not chart or was not released in that territory.

=== Singles ===
Year	Title	Peak chart positions					Certifications	Album
Year	Title	US	US R&B	CAN	NL	UK	Certifications	Album
1972	"Walkin' in the Rain with the One I Love"	14	6	40	12	14	RIAA: Gold	From a Girl's Point of View We Give to You... Love Unlimited
1972	"Is It Really True Boy - Is It Really Me"	—	—	—	—	—		From a Girl's Point of View We Give to You... Love Unlimited
1972	"Are You Sure"	—	—	—	—	—		From a Girl's Point of View We Give to You... Love Unlimited
1973	"Fragile - Handle with Care"	—	—	—	—	—		From a Girl's Point of View We Give to You... Love Unlimited
1973	"Oh Love, Well We Finally Made It"	—	70	—	—	—		Under the Influence of... Love Unlimited
1973	"Yes, We Finally Made It"	—	—	—	—	—		Under the Influence of... Love Unlimited
1973	"It May Be Winter Outside (But in My Heart It's Spring)"	83	35	—	—	11		Under the Influence of... Love Unlimited
1974	"Under the Influence of Love"	76	70	78	—	—		Under the Influence of... Love Unlimited
1974	"People of Tomorrow Are the Children of Today"	—	—	—	—	—		Together Brothers
1974	"I Belong to You"	27	1	37	—	—		In Heat
1975	"Share a Little Love in Your Heart"	—	21	—	—	—		In Heat
1977	"I Did It for Love"	—	66	—	—	—		He's All I've Got
1979	"High Steppin', Hip Dressin' Fella (You Got It Together)"	—	45	—	—	—		Love Is Back
1980	"I'm So Glad That I'm a Woman"	—	96	—	2	—		Love Is Back
1980	"If You Want Me, Say It"	—	71	—	—	—		Love Is Back
"—" denotes a recording that did not chart or was not released in that territory.
