= Paul Politi =

American songwriter

Paul Leo Politi (born July 31, 1943) is an American songwriter, famous for his collaboration of over 40 songs with singer and songwriter Barry White.

Politi and White collaborated in writing songs including the singer Felice Taylor during the mid 1960s. Various songs co-written for her included "It May Be Winter Outside (But in My Heart It's Spring)" in 1967 and the follow-up "Under the Influence of Love". Both were later covered by Love Unlimited, a protégée female vocal group established through Barry White's initiative and were hit singles in the United States. The international fame came through "I Feel Love Comin' On", also co-written by Politi and White. The song became a hit for Taylor in the United Kingdom and throughout Europe in 1967.

Other Politi songs include "Those Oldies but Goodies (Remind Me of You)" by Little Caesar & the Romans co-written by Politi and Nick Curinga in 1961 and "I'm So Glad That I'm a Woman" by the female trio Love Unlimited. Politi songs have also been recorded by Kenny Vance and the Planotones, The Love Unlimited Orchestra, Kylie Minogue, Jay-Z with The Notorious B.I.G., Puff Daddy, Mary J. Blige, Black Rob, Big Pun, The Beatnuts, Sonny Knight, Steps, Sunny & the Sunglows, Al Wilson, Wayne Newton Nino and the Ebb Tides & KHALIQ.

Politi also co-wrote most of the songs on Barry White album, The Message Is Love, in 1979. Three songs written by Politi and White charted on the US Billboard R&B chart; "Any Fool Could See (You Were Meant for Me)", "It Ain't Love, Babe (Until You Give It)" and "Love Ain't Easy".

Paul Politi's father was the artist, author and illustrator, Leo Politi.
