= Barry White =

American R&B, soul and disco singer (1944–2003)

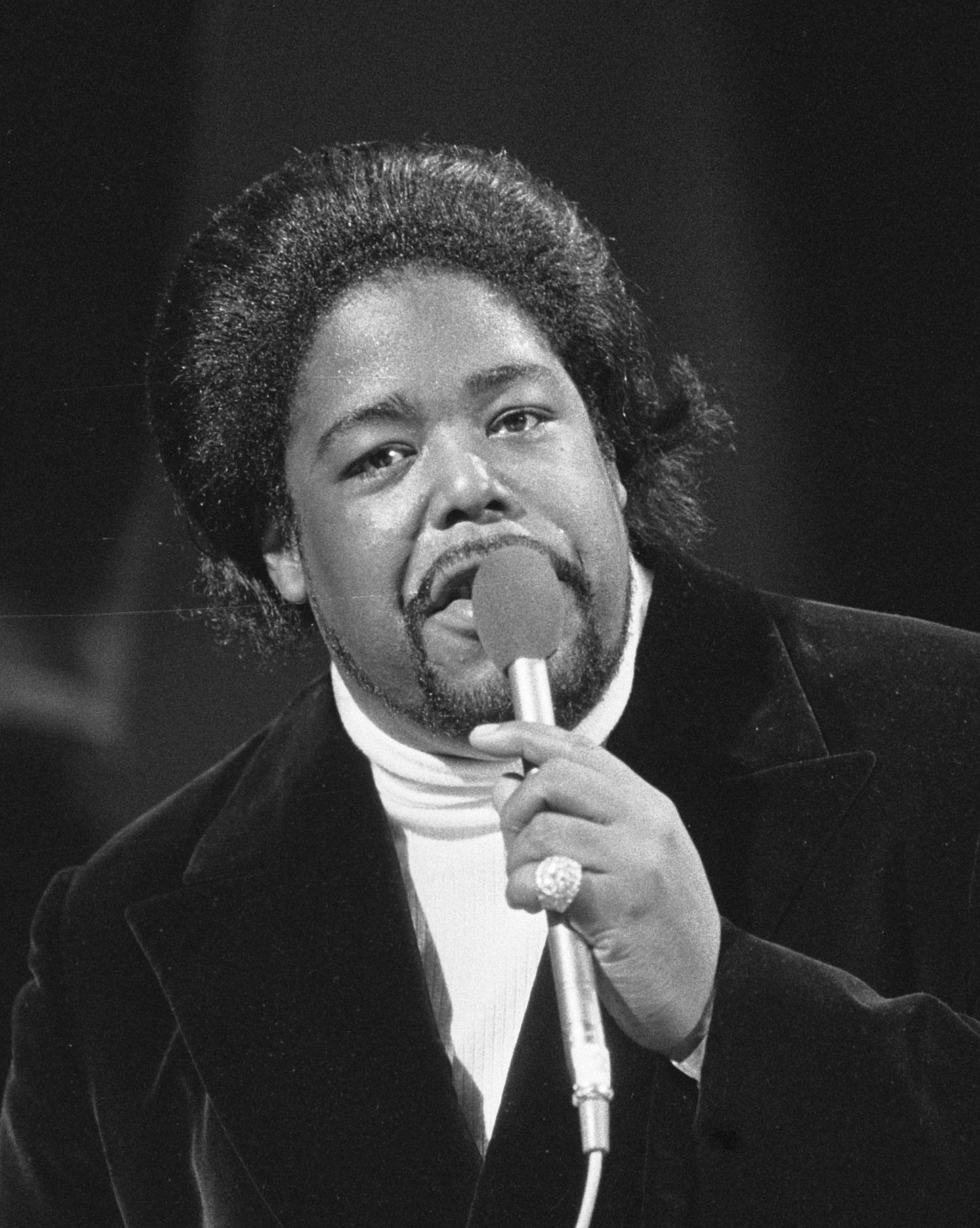
- White performing in 1974

Background information
- Also known as: Lee Barry
- Born: Barry Eugene Carter; September 12, 1944; Galveston, Texas, U.S.
- Died: July 4, 2003 (aged 58) Los Angeles, California, U.S.
- Genres: R&B; soul; disco
- Occupations: Singer; songwriter; record producer; composer; actor
- Instruments: Vocals; keyboards
- Works: Barry White discography
- Years active: 1958–2003
- Labels: Downey; 20th Century Fox; Unlimited Gold; Casablanca; Mercury; Private; BMG; A&M; Eagle
- Spouses: Mary (divorced); Glodean James (m. 1974, separated)

Barry Eugene White (né Carter; September 12, 1944 – July 4, 2003) was an American R&B, soul and disco singer, songwriter, actor, and record producer. A two-time Grammy Award winner known for his bass voice and romantic image, his greatest success came in the 1970s as a solo singer and with the Love Unlimited Orchestra, who made the #1 hit "Love's Theme" written by White. His music contains elements of multiple genres, such as R&B, soul, and disco; this is evident in his two biggest hits: "Can't Get Enough of Your Love, Babe" and "You're the First, the Last, My Everything".

White recorded 20 studio albums during the course of his career, while multiple versions and compilations were released worldwide that were certified gold, 41 of which also attained platinum status. White had 20 gold and 10 platinum singles, with worldwide record sales in excess of 100 million records, and is one of the best-selling music artists of all time.

== Early life ==
White was born Barry Eugene Carter on September 12, 1944, in Galveston, Texas. His mother was Sadie Marie Carter, and his father was Melvin A. White, who, unbeknownst to his mother, was married. Upon seeing her last name on his son's birth certificate, Melvin scratched that out and wrote White. Although his parents never married, they had a second child, Darryl, who was 13 months younger.

White grew up in the Watts neighborhood of South Los Angeles, California, listening to his mother's classical music collection. He took to the piano to emulate what he heard on the records. White said: "My mother had never even told me she could play, but when I walked in the front door and heard her playing Beethoven, it was the most amazing thing, to this day, that I have ever experienced. It was so emotional that I had to play piano." White has often been credited with playing piano on Jesse Belvin's 1956 hit single, "Goodnight My Love" at age 11, but White denied that and said it was an exaggeration because Belvin, who was 12 years older, lived in the same neighborhood.

White attended Jacob A. Riis High School, an all-boys academy in southeast Los Angeles. White's voice deepened suddenly when he was 13 or 14. He recalled: "[As a child], I had a normal squeaky kid voice. Then as a teenager, that completely changed. My mother cried because she knew her baby boy had become a man." He further recalled: "I woke up one morning ... I spoke to my mother, and I scared both of us."

White was jailed for four months at the age of 16 for stealing $30,000 worth of Cadillac tires (equivalent to $310,000 in 2023). While in jail, he listened to Elvis Presley singing "It's Now or Never" on the radio, an experience he later credited with changing the course of his life. White had another moment of inspiration on his 18th birthday, which also was the first day of his senior year of high school. He skipped class to walk to Capitol Records headquarters in Hollywood and stood across the street from the office staring for hours. Seeing the liveliness of the area it inspired him to work in Hollywood in the entertainment industry, despite not knowing how to read or write music.

== Music career ==
=== 1960s ===
After his release from jail, White left the criminal life and began a musical career at the beginning of the 1960s in singing groups. He first released "Too Far to Turn Around" in 1960 as part of the Upfronts before working for various small independent labels in Los Angeles. He also recorded several singles under his own name in the early 1960s, backed by vocal groups the Atlantics (for the Rampart and Faro labels) and the Majestics (for the Linda and Jordan labels). White had no involvement with Bob & Earl's 1963 hit single "Harlem Shuffle", a song he has sometimes been credited with producing; in his 1999 autobiography, White confirmed the song had been produced by Gene Page, who had worked with him on many of his 1970s successes.

In 1965, White produced "Feel Aw Right" by the Bel Cantos, released on the Downey label. He recorded his debut single, "Man Ain't Nothin'"/"I Don't Need It", released under the name "Lee Barry" on Downey in 1966. He also co-wrote "Together Forever", released by Pat Powdrill & the Powerdrills in 1967.

In the mid-'60s, Bob Keane of Del-Fi Records hired him as an A&R man for his new Bronco Records imprint, and White started working with the label's artists, including Viola Wills and the Bobby Fuller Four, as a songwriter, session musician, and arranger. He discovered singer Felice Taylor and arranged her song "I Feel Love Comin' On", co-written with his friend Paul Politi. It became a big hit in the UK. Other charting hits written by White and Politi for her included "It May Be Winter Outside (But in My Heart It's Spring)" and "Under the Influence of Love". Bronco issued one of White's first singles, 1967's "All in the Run of a Day", produced by Keane and White. White also wrote "Doin' the Banana Split" for TV bubblegum pop act the Banana Splits in 1968.

In 1969, White was signed by Forward Records of Los Angeles, a division of Transcontinental Entertainment Corporation, as a producer.

=== 1970s as producer ===
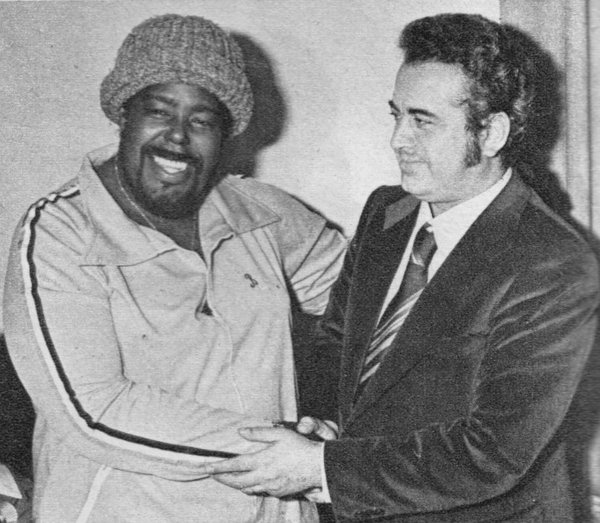
White (left) with Vittorio Salvetti in Italy, 1976

In 1972, White got his big break producing a girl group he had discovered called Love Unlimited. Formed in imitative style of the Motown girl group the Supremes, the group members had gradually honed their talents with White for two years until they signed contracts with Uni Records. His friend Paul Politi told him about music industry businessman Larry Nunes, who helped to finance their album. After it was recorded, Nunes took the recording to Russ Regan, who was the head of the Uni label owned by MCA. The album, 1972's From A Girl's Point of View We Give to You... Love Unlimited, became the first of White's string of long-titled albums and singles.

White produced, wrote and arranged their classic soul ballad "Walkin' in the Rain with the One I Love", which climbed to No. 14 in the Billboard Hot 100 Pop chart and No. 6 on the Billboard R&B chart in late 1972. It became White's first million selling single as a writer and producer. This single also reached No. 12 in the UK chart. White's voice can clearly be heard in this piece as he plays the lover who answers the phone call of the female lead.

Soon after, Regan left Uni for 20th Century Records. Without Regan, White's relationship with Uni soured. With his relationship with Uni over and Love Unlimited contract-bound with the label, White was able to switch both his production deal and the group to 20th Century Records. They recorded several other hits throughout the 1970s, "I Belong to You", which spent over five months on the Billboard R&B chart in 1974 including a week at No. 1 and "Under the Influence of Love Unlimited", which hit No. 3 on the Billboard Pop album charts. White married the lead singer of the group, Glodean James, on July 4, 1974.

=== The Love Unlimited Orchestra ===
In 1973, White created The Love Unlimited Orchestra, a 40-piece orchestral group to be used originally as a backing band for the girl-group Love Unlimited. However, White had other plans, and in 1973, he released a single with "Love's Theme" (written by him and played by the orchestra), which reached No. 1 on the Billboard Hot 100. Later, in 1974, he made the first album of the Love Unlimited Orchestra, Rhapsody in White, containing "Love's Theme". White would continue to make albums with the orchestra, achieving some successes such as: "Rhapsody in White", "Satin Soul", "Forever in Love", "Midnight Groove", "My Sweet Summer Suite", Remake of "Theme From King Kong". The orchestra ceased to make albums in 1983 but continued to support White as a backing band.

=== 1970s solo career ===
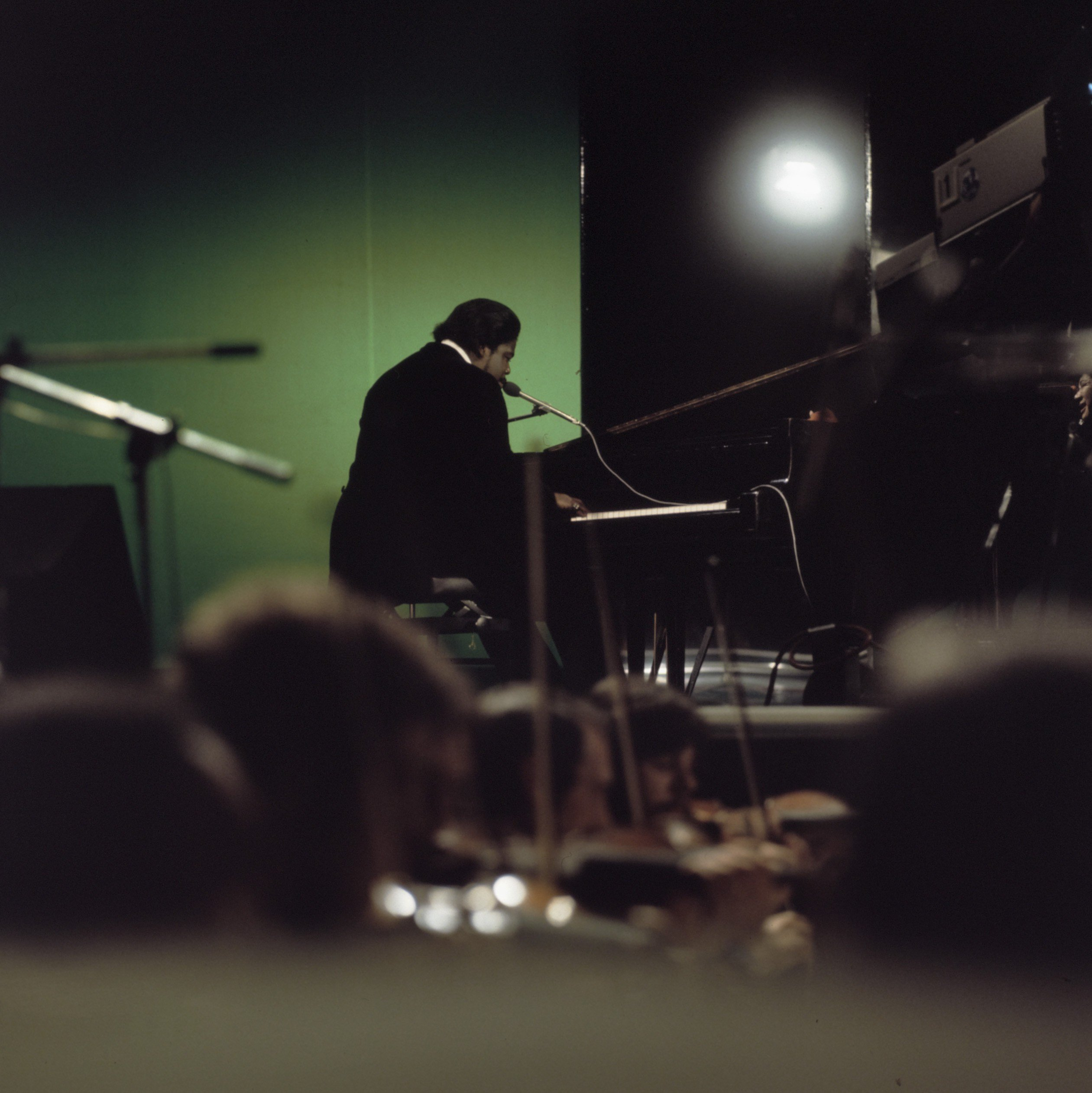
White performing on piano in 1974

White wanted to work with another act, but decided to work with a solo male artist. While working on a few demos for a male singer, he made three song demos of himself singing and playing, but Nunes heard them and insisted that he re-record and release them himself as a solo recording artist.

He then wrote several other songs and recorded them for what eventually became an entire album of music. He was going to use the name "White Heat", but decided on using his given name instead. White was still hesitating up to the time the label copy was made. It eventually became White's first solo album, I've Got So Much to Give (1973). The album spawned the singles the title track and his first solo chart hit, "I'm Gonna Love You Just a Little More Baby", which also rose to No. 1 on the Billboard R&B charts as well as No. 3 on the Billboard Pop charts in 1973 and stayed in the top 40 for many weeks.

His follow-up album, Stone Gon', also released in 1973, included the number one R&B and top ten pop hit "Never, Never Gonna Give You Up". The albums helped White to win a Grammy Award nomination for Best New Artist, though he'd lose to Bette Midler. His next release, Can't Get Enough (1974), spawned his signature hits "Can't Get Enough of Your Love, Babe" and "You're the First, the Last, My Everything", with the former becoming his first US number one on the Billboard Hot 100 and the latter topping the UK charts.

White's further hits during this era included "What Am I Gonna Do with You" (1975), "Let the Music Play" (1976), "It's Ecstasy When You Lay Down Next to Me" (1977), and "Your Sweetness Is My Weakness" (1978).

White also had a strong following in the UK. He played Villa Park in May 1975, and scored five Top 10 hits and a No. 1 for "You're the First, the Last, My Everything". Due to his large frame, facial hair, and deep voice, he was given the nickname "The Walrus of Love" in the UK and in the US, "Dr. Love", "Mr. Love", "Prince of Pillow Talk", "Ambassador of Romance", "King of Disco" "The Maestro" or "Guru of Love".

After six years, White left 20th Century in 1979 to launch his own label, Unlimited Gold, with CBS/Columbia Records.

=== 1980s ===
Although his prominence in commercial charts declined as the disco era came to an end, he maintained a loyal following throughout his career. Despite several albums over the next three years, he failed to repeat his earlier successes, with no singles managing to reach the Billboard Hot 100, except for 1982's "Change", climbing into the Billboard R&B Top 20 where it reached a peak of No. 12. His label venture was exacting a heavy financial cost on White, so he concentrated on mostly touring and finally folded his label in 1983.

After four years, he signed with A&M Records, and with the release of 1987's The Right Night & Barry White, the single entitled "Sho' You Right" made it to the Billboard R&B charts, peaking at No. 17. In 1989, he released The Man Is Back! and with it had three top 40 singles on the Billboard R&B charts: "Super Lover", which made it to No. 34, "I Wanna Do It Good to Ya", which made it to No. 26, and "When Will I See You Again", which made it to No. 32.

=== 1990s ===
A 1970s nostalgia fad allowed White to enjoy a renewed wave of popularity in the 1990s. After participating in the song "The Secret Garden (Sweet Seduction Suite)" from Quincy Jones's 1989 album Back on the Block, White mounted an effective comeback with several albums, each more successful than the one before. He returned to chart prominence in 1991 with the album Put Me in Your Mix, which reached No. 8 on the Billboard R&B Albums chart and the song by the same name reached No. 2 on the Billboard R&B singles chart.

In 1994, White released The Icon Is Love, which went to No. 1 on the Billboard R&B album charts, and the single "Practice What You Preach" gave him his first No. 1 on the Billboard R&B singles chart in almost 20 years. The album was nominated for a Grammy in the Best R&B Album category, but lost to TLC's CrazySexyCool. In 1996, White recorded the duet "In Your Wildest Dreams" with Tina Turner. 1996 also saw the release of Space Jam and its soundtrack, on which White had a duet with Chris Rock, called "Basketball Jones", a remake of Cheech & Chong's "Basketball Jones" from 1973.

White's final album, 1999's Staying Power, resulted in his last hit song "Staying Power", which placed No. 45 on the Billboard R&B charts. The single won him two Grammy Awards in the categories Best Male R&B Vocal Performance and Best Traditional R&B Vocal Performance.

His autobiography, Love Unlimited, written with Marc Eliot, was published in 1999 by Broadway Books.

== Influences ==
White's musical influences included artists such as James Cleveland, Ray Charles, Aretha Franklin, the Supremes, the Four Tops, and Marvin Gaye.

In the early 1980s, White claimed CBS Records contacted him on working with Gaye on his follow-up to his 1982 comeback album, Midnight Love. On the day before he was scheduled to meet the Motown icon, he got a call from his friend, singer Jermaine Jackson, that Gaye had been shot dead by his father.

White covered the Tops' "Standing in the Shadows of Love" for his 1973 debut album, I've Got So Much to Give.

== Acting career ==
Over the course of his career, White occasionally did voice-over work for television and movies. He voiced the character Brother Bear in the film Coonskin (1975). White voiced himself twice in the fourth season of The Simpsons, in the episodes "Whacking Day" and "Krusty Gets Kancelled".

White played the role of a bus driver for a Prodigy commercial in 1995, and he also portrayed the voice of a rabbit in a Good Seasons salad-dressing-mix commercial, singing a song called "You Can't Bottle Love". In addition, he narrated car commercials, including for Oldsmobile, and later on, Jeep. White also provided voice-over for Arby's commercials on television and radio to promote its Market Fresh menu. White narrated Apple's first iBook commercial. White made three guest appearances on the comedy-drama television series Ally McBeal, as his music was often featured on the show in dream sequences.

== Personal life ==
=== Marriages ===
White was first married to his childhood sweetheart, identified only as "Mary" in his autobiography, by the time he was 19. They separated in 1969 and later divorced.

In 1974, White married singer Glodean James. The couple collaborated on the 1981 album Barry & Glodean. They reportedly separated in 1988, but they were still legally married until White's death in 2003, although they lived separate lives. Although estranged from White for over a decade, as his widow she was made sole executor of his estate.

=== Children ===
White had nine children. By the age of 16, White had fathered two children with his first wife Mary. They had four children together. In 2017, his son Darryl White from his first marriage sued his estate, claiming he was cut off financially.

White had four children with his second wife Glodean James. Their daughter Shaherah was his personal assistant. Barry Jr. played in the Love Unlimited Orchestra and was also his tour manager. White's son MacKevin worked in his publishing administration.

White had a daughter, Denise Donnell, born in 1962 to Gurtha Allen. She did not discover who her biological father was until 1988. She was accepted by White and with his help she changed her name to Denise White. In 2016, she sued White's estate after she stopped receiving money.

After White's death in 2003, his girlfriend Katherine Denton claimed her infant daughter Barriana was his biological child. Denton also claimed that she was owed money and personal items that White had promised to give her. Paternity tests revealed that he was not the father of her child and Denton subsequently lost her court case.

== Health problems and death ==
White was obese for most of his adult life. He reportedly weighed up to 375 pounds (170 kg).

While undergoing dialysis and awaiting a kidney transplant in May 2003, White suffered a severe stroke, which forced him to retire from public life. He also suffered multiple seizures in his last few weeks.

White's unstable health prevented him from receiving a new kidney, and he died of kidney failure at Cedars-Sinai Medical Center in Los Angeles on July 4, 2003, at the age of 58. His remains were cremated and the ashes were scattered in the ocean off the California coast.

== Legacy ==
White is known for his bass or bass-baritone husky voice and romantic image.

On September 20, 2004, White was posthumously inducted into the Dance Music Hall of Fame at a ceremony held in New York. On September 12, 2013, which would have been White's 69th birthday, he was posthumously awarded the 2,506th star on the Hollywood Walk of Fame at 6914 Hollywood Boulevard in the category of recording. The show Counting Cars paid tribute to White by restoring the last car he owned for his widow, Glodean.

In an obituary referring to White by his nickname, "The Walrus of Love", the BBC recalled "the rich timbres of one of the most distinctive soul voices of his generation, about which it was once said: 'If chocolate fudge cake could sing, it would sound like Barry White.'"

In 2023, Rolling Stone ranked White at number 56 on its list of the 200 Greatest Singers of All Time.

== Awards and nominations ==
White was nominated for 11 Grammy Awards, winning two for Staying Power at the 42nd Annual Grammy Awards in 2000.

== Discography ==
Studio albums

- I've Got So Much to Give (1973)
- Stone Gon' (1973)
- Also see "The Love Unlimited Orchestra" formed by Barry White with classic songs such as "Love's Theme" (1973)
- Can't Get Enough (1974)
- Just Another Way to Say I Love You (1975)
- Let the Music Play (1976)
- Is This Whatcha Wont? (1976)
- Barry White Sings for Someone You Love (1977)
- The Man (1978)
- I Love to Sing the Songs I Sing (1979)
- The Message Is Love (1979)
- Sheet Music (1980)
- Barry & Glodean (With Glodean White) (1981)
- Beware! (1981)
- Change (1982)
- Dedicated (1983)
- The Right Night & Barry White (1987)
- The Man Is Back! (1989)
- Put Me in Your Mix (1991)
- The Icon Is Love (1994)
- Staying Power (1999)
