= Booty Luv discography =

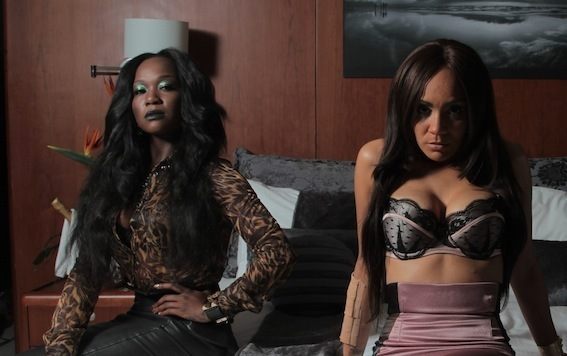
- A promo shot from the video shoot of Black Widow
- Studio albums: 1
- Singles: 7
- Music videos: 8
- Promotional singles: 1

The discography of Booty Luv, an English dance duo who formed in June 2006 following the split of their former band Big Brovaz, originally known as Booty Luv before changing their name in 2011, consists of one studio album, and seven singles. They released their first single "Boogie 2nite", a cover of the Tweet single in November 2006 which entered the UK charts at number two. Due to the success of the single a second single was released, this time a cover of the Luther Vandross song "Shine" which was released in May 2007 and entered the UK charts at number ten and the Dance Chart at number one. The duo's debut album Boogie 2nite was released in September 2007 which went to number eleven on the UK album chart and certified Gold. Three more singles were taken from the album including "Don't Mess with My Man", "Some Kinda Rush" and final single "Dance Dance" but was not officially released in the United Kingdom.

Following a two-year break to record their second studio album the duo released "Say It" which was set to be taken as the lead single from the album but due to low single sales the album was cancelled. Following the cancellation of the second album the duo went on a two-year hiatus, they reformed under their new name in September 2011 "Cherise & Nadia" and released the promotional single "This Night". The duo released "Black Widow" the first single from their forthcoming second studio album on 3 February 2013 but failed to chart.

== Albums ==
=== Studio albums ===
Title	Album details	Peak chart positions			Certifications
Title	Album details	UK	UK Dance	SCO	Certifications
Boogie 2nite	Released: 17 September 2007; Label: Hed Kandi; Formats: CD, digital download	11	2	16	BPI: Silver

== Singles ==
=== As lead artist ===
Year	Title	Peak chart positions										Certifications	Album
Year	Title	UK	UK Dance	UK Indie	AUS	BEL	FIN	GER	IRE	NED	SCO	Certifications	Album
2006	"Boogie 2nite"	2	2	—	89	38	8	76	22	7	5	BPI: Gold	Boogie 2nite
2007	"Shine"	10	2	—	—	—	6	—	28	13	11		Boogie 2nite
2007	"Don't Mess with My Man"	11	7	—	—	—	9	—	26	28	13		Boogie 2nite
2007	"Some Kinda Rush"	19	3	—	—	—	—	—	47	10	13		Boogie 2nite
2008	"Dance, Dance"	—	—	—	—	—	—	—	—	27	—		Boogie 2nite
2009	"Say It"	16	—	2	—	—	—	—	—	—	9		Non-album singles
2013	"Black Widow"	—	—	—	—	—	—	—	—	—	—		Non-album singles
"—" denotes items that did not chart or were not released in that territory.

=== Promotional singles ===
Year	Title	Album
2011	"This Night"	Non-album single

== Music videos ==
Year	Video	Director(s)
2006	"Boogie 2Nite"	Jonny Mourgue
2007	"Shine"	
2007	"Don't Mess with My Man"	
2007	"Some Kinda Rush"	
2009	"Say It"	Emile Nava
2011	"This Night"	Moonrunners
2012	"Black Widow"	TBA
