= Tweet discography =

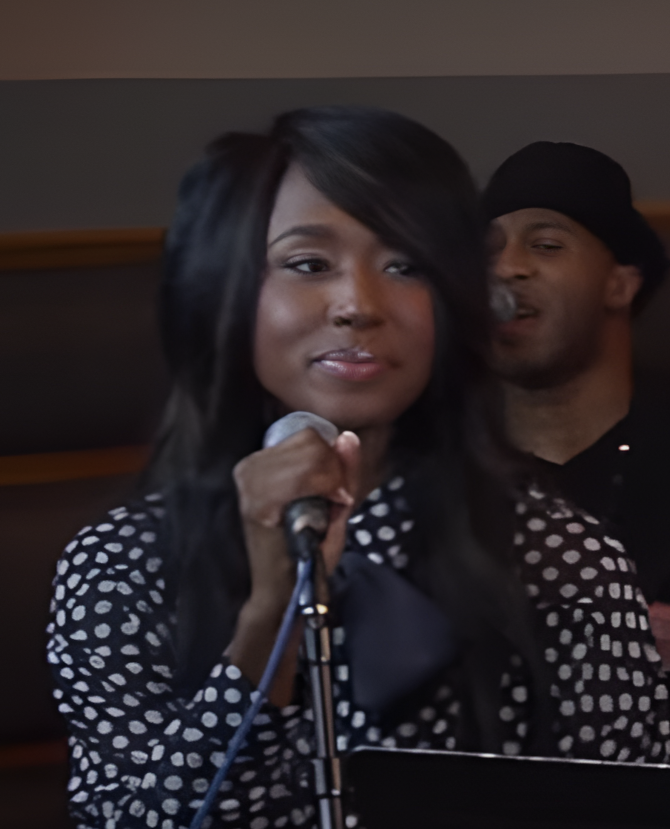
- Studio albums: 3
- Extended plays: 1
- Live albums: 1
- Singles: 13
- Music videos: 13
- Promotional singles: 2

American singer and songwriter Tweet has released three studio albums, one live album, one extended play, 13 singles (including four as a featured artist), two promotional singles, and 13 music videos.

== Albums ==
=== Studio albums ===
List of studio albums, with selected chart positions, sales figures and certifications
Title	Details	Peak chart positions										Sales	Certifications
Title	Details	US	US R&B /HH	FRA	GER	NL	NOR	NZ	SWE	SWI	UK	Sales	Certifications
Southern Hummingbird	Released: April 2, 2002; Label: Elektra; Formats: CD, LP, cassette, digital download	3	2	101	44	65	13	32	35	65	15	US: 897,000	RIAA: Gold; BPI: Silver
It's Me Again	Released: March 22, 2005; Label: Atlantic; Formats: CD, LP, digital download	17	2	—	—	—	—	—	50	—	158		
Charlene	Released: February 26, 2016; Label: eOne; Formats: CD, digital download	42	6	—	—	—	—	—	—	—	—		
"—" denotes a recording that did not chart or was not released in that territory.

=== Live albums ===
Title	Details
The Dresden Soul Symphony (MDR Symphony Orchestra featuring Joy Denalane, Bilal, Dwele and Tweet)	Released: October 24, 2008; Label: Four Music; Formats: CD, digital download

== Extended plays ==
List of extended plays, with selected chart positions
Title	Details	Peak chart positions	
Title	Details	US	US R&B /HH
Simply Tweet	Released: February 26, 2013; Label: DuBose Music Group; Format: Digital download	162	29

== Singles ==
=== As lead artist ===
List of singles as lead artist, with selected chart positions, showing year released and album name
Title	Year	Peak chart positions										Certifications	Album
Title	Year	US	US R&B /HH	AUS	FRA	GER	NL	NZ	SWE	SWI	UK	Certifications	Album
"Oops (Oh My)" (featuring Missy "Misdemeanor" Elliott)	2002	7	1	18	75	23	32	38	34	36	5	RIAA: Gold; BPI: Gold; RMNZ: Gold	Southern Hummingbird
"Call Me"	2002	31	9	89	—	95	—	—	—	—	35		Southern Hummingbird
"Boogie 2nite"	2002	—	—	—	—	—	—	—	—	—	167		Southern Hummingbird
"Thugman" (featuring Missy Elliott)	2003	—	—	—	—	—	—	—	—	—	—		Honey: Music from & Inspired by the Motion Picture
"Turn da Lights Off" (featuring Missy Elliott)	2004	— (Note: "Turn da Lights Off" did not enter the Billboard Hot 100, but peaked at number eight on the Bubbling Under Hot 100 Singles chart.)	39	—	—	—	—	—	—	—	29		It's Me Again
"Love Again"	2009	—	—	—	—	—	—	—	—	—	—		Non-album single
"Won't Hurt Me"	2015	—	— (Note: "Won't Hurt Me" did not enter the Hot R&B/Hip-Hop Songs chart, but peaked at number 23 on the Adult R&B Songs chart.)	—	—	—	—	—	—	—	—		Charlene
"Magic"	2016	—	—	—	—	—	—	—	—	—	—		Charlene
"Neva Shouda Left Ya"	2016	—	— (Note: "Neva Shouda Left Ya" did not enter the Hot R&B/Hip-Hop Songs chart, but peaked at number 23 on the Adult R&B Songs chart.)	—	—	—	—	—	—	—	—		Charlene
"Toot Toot"	2025	—	—	—	—	—	—	—	—	—	—		Non-album single
"—" denotes a recording that did not chart or was not released in that territory.

=== As featured artist ===
List of singles as featured artist, with selected chart positions, showing year released and album name
Title	Year	Peak chart positions				Album
Title	Year	US	US R&B /HH	GER	UK	Album
"Take Away" (Missy "Misdemeanor" Elliott featuring Ginuwine and introducing Tweet)	2001	45	13	96	—	Miss E... So Addictive
"All Y'all" (Timbaland & Magoo featuring Tweet)	2001	—	58	—	—	Indecent Proposal
"No Panties" (Trina featuring Tweet)	2002	—	88	—	45	Diamond Princess
"I Love Me" (Lil' Mo featuring Tweet)	2011	—	—	—	—	P.S. I Love Me
"—" denotes a recording that did not chart or was not released in that territory.

=== Promotional singles ===
List of promotional singles, with selected chart positions, showing year released and album name
Title	Year	Peaks	Album
Title	Year	US R&B /HH Bub.	Album
"Pocketbook" (Rockwilder and Missy Elliott remix) (Meshell Ndegeocello featuring Redman and Tweet)	2002	16	Cookie: The Anthropological Mixtape
"Smoking Cigarettes"	2002	1	Southern Hummingbird

== Other charted songs ==
List of other charted songs, with selected chart positions, showing year released and album name
Title	Year	Peaks		Album
Title	Year	US R&B /HH Bub.	US Rhy.	Album
"Sexual Healing (Oops Pt. 2)" (featuring Ms. Jade)	2002	24	—	Southern Hummingbird
"International Affair" (Mark Ronson featuring Sean Paul and Tweet)	2003	7	21	Here Comes the Fuzz
"—" denotes a recording that did not chart or was not released in that territory.

== Guest appearances ==
List of non-single guest appearances, with other performing artists, showing year released and album name
Title	Year	Other artist(s)	Album
"...So Addictive (Intro)" (as Charlene "Tweet" Keys)	2001	Missy Elliott	Miss E... So Addictive
"Ex"/"X"	2001	Missy Elliott, Ja Rule	Violator: The Album, V2.0/ Pain Is Love
"Love Me"	2001	Timbaland & Magoo, Petey Pablo	Indecent Proposal
"International Affair"	2003	Mark Ronson, Sean Paul	Here Comes the Fuzz
"Love You More"	2010	PJ Morton	Walk Alone
"Mirror"	2011	Keke Wyatt, Kelly Price	Unbelievable
"Angry Girl"	2011	Syleena Johnson	Chapter V: Underrated
"Survive"	2011	Lawrence Flowers & Intercession	More
"Sisters"	2012	Angie Stone, Y'Anna Crawley, Danetra Moore	Rich Girl
"Angry Girl" (live)	2012	Syleena Johnson	Acoustic Soul Sessions
"All Time Love"	2015	Jeff Bradshaw, Robert Glasper, Eric Roberson	Home: One Special Night at the Kimmel Center
"Love You More" (live)	2015	PJ Morton and the Crusade	Live Show Killer
"Full Attention"	2016	Jonathan McReynolds	Sessions
"Spread Her Wings"	2018	Chris Dave and The Drumhedz, Bilal	Chris Dave and The Drumhedz

== Other credits ==
Title	Year	Artist	Album	Credit(s)
"Old School Joint"	2001	Missy Elliott	Miss E... So Addictive	Additional vocals
"4 My People" (featuring Eve)	2001	Missy Elliott	Miss E... So Addictive	Additional vocals
"Step Off"	2001	Missy Elliott	Miss E... So Addictive	Ad libs
"X-Tasy"	2001	Missy Elliott	Miss E... So Addictive	Ad libs, songwriting
"Funroom"	2001	Petey Pablo	Diary of a Sinner: 1st Entry	Backing vocals
"Ugly"	2001	Bubba Sparxxx	Dark Days, Bright Nights	Backing vocals
"Bubba Talk"	2001	Bubba Sparxxx	Dark Days, Bright Nights/ The Wash (soundtrack)	Backing vocals
"Higher Ground (Prelude)"	2002	Missy Elliott	Miss E... So Addictive (international reissue)	Additional vocals
"Higher Ground" (featuring Karen Clark Sheard, Yolanda Adams, Kim Burrell, Dorinda Clark Cole and Mary Mary)	2002	Missy Elliott	Miss E... So Addictive (international reissue)	Additional vocals
"Only Call on Jesus"	2002	Karen Clark Sheard	2nd Chance	Backing vocals, songwriting
"She's a Gangsta"	2002	Ms. Jade	Girl Interrupted	Backing vocals
"Feel the Girl"	2002	Ms. Jade	Girl Interrupted	Backing vocals
"Back in the Day" (featuring Jay-Z)	2002	Missy Elliott	Under Construction	Additional vocals
"Pussycat"	2002	Missy Elliott	Under Construction	Additional vocals
"Nothing out There for Me" (featuring Beyoncé Knowles)	2002	Missy Elliott	Under Construction	Additional vocals
"Can You Hear Me" (featuring TLC)	2002	Missy Elliott	Under Construction	Additional vocals
"Things You Say"	2002	Whitney Houston	Just Whitney	Backing vocals, songwriting, vocal production
"American Life" (Missy Elliott's American Dream Remix)	2003	Madonna	"American Life" (single)	Additional vocals
"So Gone"	2003	Monica	After the Storm	Additional vocals
"So Gone" (remix) (featuring Busta Rhymes)	2003	Monica	After the Storm	Additional vocals
"U-Haul"	2004	Angie Stone	Stone Love	Backing vocals
"Teary Eyed"	2005	Missy Elliott	The Cookbook	Backing vocals
"Gotta Move On"	2006	Monica	The Makings of Me	Backing vocals
"Weary"	2016	Solange	A Seat at the Table	Additional vocals
"Mad" (featuring Lil Wayne)	2016	Solange	A Seat at the Table	Additional vocals
"F.U.B.U." (featuring The-Dream and BJ the Chicago Kid)	2016	Solange	A Seat at the Table	Additional vocals

== Music videos ==
List of music videos, showing year released and directors
Title	Year	Director(s)
"Take Away" (Missy "Misdemeanor" Elliott featuring Ginuwine and introducing Tweet)	2001	Dave Meyers
"All Y'all" (Timbaland & Magoo featuring Tweet)	2001	Nick Quested
"Oops (Oh My)" (featuring Missy "Misdemeanor" Elliott)	2002	Cameron Casey
"Call Me"	2002	Chris Robinson
"No Panties" (Trina featuring Tweet)	2002	Charles Infante and Dave Meyers
"Turn da Lights Off" (featuring Missy Elliott)	2005	Antti J.
"When I Need a Man"	2005	Antti J.
"I Love Me" (Lil' Mo featuring Tweet)	2012	Dantrell "DanDaCameraman" Cohen
"All Time Love" (Jeff Bradshaw featuring Robert Glasper, Eric Roberson and Tweet)	2015	Hezekiah + Embassy
"Won't Hurt Me"	2015	Matthew A. Cherry
"Magic"	2016	Leo Marshall
"Neva Shouda Left Ya"	2016	Derek Blanks
"I Was Created for This"	2016	Paul Coy Allen
"Toot Toot"	2026	Unknown
"Love Again"	2026	Unknown
