= Cherise Roberts =

English singer and songwriter

- Born: Cherise Roberts; 29 December 1982 (age 43)
- Origin: London, England
- Genres: Pop, R&B, dance
- Occupations: Singer, songwriter
- Instruments: Vocals
- Years active: 2001–present
- Member of: Booty Luv; Big Brovaz

Cherise Roberts (born 16 December 1982) is an English singer and songwriter who is a member of the hip hop/R&B group Big Brovaz and the dance-pop duo Booty Luv a.k.a. Cherise & Nadia. She has been with both groups since they both started. Roberts released a solo album, Look Inside before the debut album Nu-Flow by Big Brovaz was released. It only spawned one single, "2nd Best", while the album won a MOBO award.

== History ==
=== 2002–2006: early career and Big Brovaz ===
Cherise, and her friend Nadia, both began their career in the R&B group Big Brovaz, who had considerable success following their launch in 2002. Cherise was an established singer before the group's success, recording the solo album Look Inside and single "2nd Best". The album was much praised and won a MOBO Award. After scoring top five hits with songs such as "Favourite Things" and "Nu Flow", Big Brovaz received rave reviews from fans and critics for their unique style, and received comparisons with other groups such as Outkast and solo artists such as Eminem, Nelly and Jamelia. After a lengthy hiatus following one member's drug addiction being revealed, Big Brovaz re-instated their career in 2004 with new single "Yours Fatally". Expectations were high following their previous string of top ten hits, although the single disappointingly stalled at number 15 in the UK top 40 and third female member Dion left the band. Subsequently, the band were dropped by their record label. This resulted in a three-year gap before they finally released a second studio album. In April 2007, new album Re-Entry was released, although it was a commercial disaster and failed to chart.

Booty Luv was created during early recordings of Big Brovaz' Re-Entry album when music executives offered Cherise and Nadia the chance to record and promote a new version of R&B/soul singer Tweet's club hit "Boogie 2nite". Following the poor sales of early singles from Re-Entry in mid-2006, the girls accepted the offer and began recording their new version of the song, initially only as a promotional track for the record label Hed Kandi. Six months later in December, however, Booty Luv's version of "Boogie 2nite" was decided to be released as an actual single in the United Kingdom and mainland Europe following positive reviews from club DJs on the dance scene. It peaked at number two on the UK Singles Chart, behind Take That's comeback single, "Patience".

=== 2006–2009: Booty Luv ===
In late 2006, the video for "Boogie 2nite" was sent to top music channels and the song was heavily promoted. The original dance remix by Seamus Haji was chosen for the song's download and physical releases, while the video was chosen to feature the remix by the group DB Boulevard. The song continued its success onto digital music video channels, holding Number one positions on The Hits Most Selected and TMF Hitlist UK. The song was released on download format a week before the physical release, and shot to Number 1 on the 3 Download Chart. This furthered its success into the UK Singles Chart, where it peaked at Number 19 on download sales before climbing as high as number 2 following its physical release. It also became their first number 1 single on the UK Dance Chart. Spending 17 weeks inside the UK top 75, the positive response for "Boogie 2nite" resulted in Booty Luv extending their contract with Hed Kandi to four follow up singles and an album. As of September 2009, the single re-entered the UK Dance Chart at number 31 following on from the popularity of the band's recent single "Say It", three years after its original release.

In 2007, after taking several months to record their debut album, Booty Luv released the follow-up single "Shine", a cover of the Luther Vandross song on 14 May. It was well received by radio and added to the A-List on BBC Radio 1, peaking at number 17 on the UK Airplay Chart. In its first week of release, "Shine" entered the UK Singles Chart at number 25 on downloads alone, and became the group's second top ten single the following week when it jumped 15 places to number 10 following its physical release, spending an eventual seven weeks inside the UK top 40. It also managed to hit the top spot on the UK Dance Chart.

Their debut album Boogie 2nite was released 17 September 2007, one week after third single "Don't Mess with My Man" (a cover of a Lucy Pearl song) made the UK top 20 at number 11, and the UK Dance Chart at number 1, taking their number of UK Dance number 1 singles to three. The album features the three hit singles "Boogie 2nite", "Shine" and "Don't Mess with My Man", a new cover as well as five original songs, including the final UK top 20 hit from the album, "Some Kinda Rush". The album is co-written by Booty Luv and two co-writers. On 24 September 2007, Boogie 2nite entered the UK Albums Chart at a respectable number 11 and just missed the top twenty the next week, falling to number 26. It was officially certified as silver by the BPI in late 2008, denoting 70,000+ copies sold.

The fourth single to be released from the album was "Some Kinda Rush", the first original release by the group. On the week commencing 28 November 2007, the song had a surge in download sales solely from the album following the song's early promotion, when it entered the UK top 100 at number 93, four weeks before its official download release. It continued to hold inside the UK top 100 before becoming Booty Luv's fourth consecutive UK top 20 hit when it rose to number 19 following its combined physical and download sales. On the week commencing 28 January 2008, the single outlasted "Don't Mess with My Man" in the UK top 40 despite its lower peak, with "Some Kinda Rush" spending seven weeks on the chart, and "Don't Mess with My Man" spending only four. Their debut album Boogie 2nite also experienced a resurgence into the UK top 100 following the success of "Some Kinda Rush". It re-entered the UK top 100 albums chart at number 96, before climbing as high as 87. The album has so far spent four weeks inside the UK top 100 following the release of "Some Kinda Rush", and eight weeks in total. In late 2007, iTunes offered fans the chance to download one of the original songs from the album - "Something to Talk About" free of cost, since it was the "Free Single of the Week".

A fifth single from the album, "Dance Dance", was given a limited release across Europe in 2008, managing to achieve top 5 success on the Netherlands' dance chart. It furthered this success onto the official Netherlands singles chart, peaking at number 27. The CD track listing included two new remixes and a megamix of the group's singles so far.

Nadia and Cherise confirmed in an interview with Digital Spy in 2007 that they planned to begin work on their second album in 2008. They also mentioned that they were talking about future plans with Hed Kandi and did not want the next album to feature any cover versions, but for the new album to contain only original songs. In an interview with Digital Spy in July 2009, Nadia revealed that the band had been working with multiple producers, whereas with "Boogie 2nite" they only worked with one. It was thus revealed that the album had "an edgier style", as described by Shepherd. She also commented that "some tracks have a real R&B vibe to them, others are proper dance tracks and some are typical poppier tracks. It's a really exciting mixture of sounds." Bandmate Cherise also stated that they had been working with Fraser T. Smith, the producer behind Tinchy Stryder's number one hit "Number One". The track they worked on with him is entitled "One Dance".

The first single from the new album is titled "Say It", and was premiered on Friday 10 April 2009. The first performance of the single was at Sony Ericsson's Dance Nation Festival where the girls did a set. The musicality of the song differs slightly from the previous material released by the band, having more of an electro feel to it. The single was released on 31 August 2009, and was premiered on the official Hed Kandi website and the video sharing site YouTube. The single was Popjustice's "Single of the Day" on 10 April 2009. It was added to BBC Radio 1's B-List at the start of August, moving up to the much-coveted A-List during the successful week of release.

The single continued the group's run of UK top 20 hits, debuting at number 16 on Sunday 6 September 2009, the week's fourth highest new entry. The group then worked on new material and a single was due for release in autumn 2011.
