= The Inbetweeners Soundtrack =

- The Inbetweeners title card image, also used as the album cover for The Inbetweeners Soundtrack

Soundtrack album by The Inbetweeners and various artists
- Released: 2 November 2009
- Recorded: 1980–2009
- Genre: Alternative rock punk rock contemporary R&B comedy rock spoken word
- Length: 160 minutes
- Label: EMI TV

The Inbetweeners and various artists chronology
The Inbetweeners Soundtrack (2009)	The Inbetweeners Movie (2011)

The Inbetweeners Soundtrack is a compilation album released as the soundtrack album for the British comedy series The Inbetweeners. It was released in November 2009 by EMI Records. It is a double album containing 48 tracks, featuring various artist tracks and sound bites from the first two series of the programme.

== Description ==
Due to being released in 2009, it only covers the first two series of The Inbetweeners. Its cover is similar to The Inbetweeners Series 1 DVD cover and title screen from all three series.

It features a majority of the tracks from the series. Not included is "Just Like Heaven" by The Cure, which plays during the credits of "The Duke of Edinburgh Awards". Other songs featured in the series are also missing, such as The Drums's "Let's Go Surfing", The Feeling's "Fill My Little World", Razorlight's "Before I Fall to Pieces", The Fratellis "Chelsea Dagger", Calvin Harris's "Acceptable in the 80s", Gorillaz' "Feel Good Inc.", The Ting Tings "That's Not My Name", Girls Aloud's "Something Kinda Ooooh", Sugababes' "Round Round", Rachel Stevens' "Some Girls", Rihanna's "S.O.S", Booty Luv's "Some Kinda Rush", The Ting Tings' "Shut Up and Let Me Go", Booty Luv's "Shine", The Chemical Brothers' "Setting Sun", and Damien Rice's "9 Crimes".

The album features fourteen tracks that are clips (samples) taken from moments in the programme. some are these are featured in The Inbetweeners: Top 10 Moments.

It also features cut-outs of the four main characters in the programme (in box forms), as well as unseen photos and sleeve notes.

== Track listing ==
=== Disc one ===
1. "Briefcase" (Dialogue) (from First Day)
2. "Gone Up In Flames" - by Morning Runner (theme music)
3. "Don't Look Back Into The Sun" by The Libertines
4. "Mr Maker" by The Kooks
5. "Moving to New York " by The Wombats
6. "Miss Timbs" (Dialogue)
7. "SexyBack" by Justin Timberlake featuring Timbaland (from Caravan Club)
8. "Sheila" by Jamie T
9. "Bumder" (Dialogue) (from Bunk Off)
10. "Foundations" by Kate Nash
11. "Fluorescent Adolescent" by Arctic Monkeys
12. "Love Is An Unfamiliar Name" by The Duke Spirit
13. "She Knows" by Thom Stone
14. "She's Got You High" by Mumm-Ra
15. "Caravan Club" (Dialogue) (from Caravan Club)
16. "Second, Minute Or Hour" by Jack Peñate
17. "In Between Days" by The Cure (from Will Gets a Girlfriend)
18. "I'm a Cuckoo" by Belle & Sebastian
19. "Friend" (Dialogue) (from Will Gets a Girlfriend)
20. "Gallery" by Tellison
21. "She Can Do What She Wants" by Field Music
22. "You Won't Stop" by New Cassettes
23. "Business" (Dialogue)
24. "The Creeps (Get On The Dancefloor)" by Freaks
25. "Cinema Car" by Transformer
26. "Elasticity" by Royworld
27. "A Pessimist Is Never Disappointed" by Theaudience (from Xmas Party)
28. "Underage Drinkers" (Dialogue)

=== Disc two ===
1. "Morning Benders" (Dialogue)
2. "A Whole Child Ago" by Biffy Clyro
3. "Neil's Lego Collection" (Dialogue)
4. "Kids With Guns" (Hot Chip Remix) by Gorillaz
5. "Dance wiv Me" by Dizzee Rascal feat. Calvin Harris & Chrome
6. "Fish Punch" (Dialogue) (from The Field Trip)
7. "Latchmere" by The Maccabees
8. "To Lose My Life" by White Lies
9. "Girls And Boys In Love" by The Rumble Strips
10. "Feisty One You Are" (Dialogue) (from The Field Trip)
11. "Over and Over" by Hot Chip
12. "Fire Fire" by Sam Isaac
13. "War of the Worlds" by Get Cape. Wear Cape. Fly.
14. "Fit 4 U" by The Young Knives
15. "Simon At The Disco" (Dialogue)
16. "About Your Dress" by The Maccabees
17. "Born In the '70s" by Ed Harcourt
18. "Drive By" (Dialogue) (from A Night Out in London)
19. "Cuddle Fuddle" by Passion Pit
20. "Wild Orphan" by Lloyd Cole
21. "Jay Gets Dumped" (Dialogue)
22. "That's Entertainment" by The Jam
