= Simply Tweet =

EP by Tweet
- Released: February 26, 2013
- Length: 20:18
- Label: DuBose Music Group
- Producer: Charlie Bereal; Craig Brockman; Charlene "Tweet" Keys; John "Jubu" Smith; Nisan Stewart

Tweet chronology
The Dresden Soul Symphony (2008)	Simply Tweet (2013)	Charlene (2016)

Singles from Simply Tweet
- 1. "Enough" Released: January 29, 2013

Simply Tweet is the debut extended play (EP) by American recording artist Tweet, released digitally on February 26, 2013. It features four original songs and a cover of Aretha Franklin's "Day Dreaming".

== Background ==
In 2007, Tweet signed to the late Jheryl Busby and Mike City's record label, Umbrella Recordings. There she began recording material for her third studio album, formerly titled Love, Tweet. The album was rumored to be led by the singles "My Dear" featuring T.I., "Anymore" and "Real Lady". However, all singles were scrapped and the album was ultimately shelved. The single "Love Again" was self-released on iTunes in 2009.

In late 2011, Tweet signed to MC Lyte's record label DuBose Music Group. On June 5, 2012, Tweet posted a cover of Aretha Franklin's 1972 song "Day Dreaming" on her new website as a part of her weekly SoundCloud-hosted special, Tweet Tuesdays. Another four songs over the next few weeks followed. These included previously unreleased songs from It's Me Again and Love, Tweet recording sessions. "Trouble" produced by Warryn Campbell, "C 4EVA", "Face To Face" produced by Joonie and "Proceed".

== Promotion ==
On February 13, 2013, Tweet held a listening party in New York City for her new EP, which was released the following week on February 26, 2013. The EP is a selection of five brand-new songs that Tweet recorded live with a full backing band in Los Angeles. In late May 2013, Tweet performed two sold-out shows at The Jazz Café in Camden Town, London, performing tracks from her two previous albums Southern Hummingbird and It's Me Again as well new tracks from the EP. This was her first time performing in the United Kingdom.

== Critical reception ==
Professional ratings
Review scores
Source	Rating
AllMusic	3.5/5 stars

AllMusic editor Andy Kellman called the extended play a "short, sweet set that has a casual live band feel compared to her producer-driven major-label releases [...] Fans of the more organic moments from Southern Hummingbird and It's Me Again, such as "Complain" and "Small Change," will be happiest with the direction taken here."

== Track listing ==
Simply Tweet track listing
No.	Title	Writer(s)	Length
1.	"Intro"	Charlene Keys; Craig Brockman; Tony Russell; David Haddon; Serg Dimitrijevic	1:25
2.	"Day Dreaming"	Aretha Franklin	2:43
3.	"Way to Love"	Keys; Brockman; Russell; Haddon; Dimitrijevic	5:44
4.	"Sorry"	Keys; Brockman; Russell; Haddon; Dimitrijevic	5:20
5.	"Enough"	Keys; Brockman; Russell; Haddon; Dimitrijevic	5:06
Total length:			20:18

== Charts ==
Weekly chart performance for Simply Tweet
Chart (2013)	Peak position
US Billboard 200	162
US Independent Albums (Billboard)	26
US Top R&B/Hip-Hop Albums (Billboard)	29
