= Seamus Haji discography =

- Remix albums: 83
- Singles: 50

This is the discography of British DJ and producer Seamus Haji.

== Singles ==
=== As Seamus Haji ===
- 1996 Seamus Haji - "Big Bang Theory"
- 2004 Seamus Haji - "Last Night a DJ Saved My Life" (Charts : #69 UK)
- 2004 ATFC & Seamus Haji -"Freaky"
- 2004 ATFC & Seamus Haji - "Ooh Ooh Ah!"
- 2005 Seamus Haji - "Angels Of Love"
- 2005 Seamus Haji - "Changes"
- 2005 Haji & Emanuel - "Weekend"
- 2005 Haji & Emanuel - "Take Me Away" (Charts : #20 Finland; #73 UK)
- 2006 Timmy Vegas & Seamus Haji - "Devotion (A Bit More Lovin')"
- 2006 Seamus Haji & Steve Mac - "Happy"
- 2007 Seamus Haji - "Last Night a DJ Saved My Life" (re-release) (featuring KayJay) - (Charts : #6 Finland, #13 UK)
- 2007 Haji & Emanuel feat Robert Owens - "If"
- 2008 Seamus Haji feat. Doug Lazy - "Head To Toe"
- 2008 Seamus Haji & Lords of Flatbush - "24 Hours (Nice Tight Derriere)"
- 2009 Haji & Emanuel featuring Beverly Knight & Bryan Chambers - "The Pressure"
- 2009 Romain Curtis & Seamus Haji feat. Awa - "I've Been Looking"
- 2009 Seamus Haji & ATFC featuring K.C Flightt - "Speaker"
- 2009 Haji & Emanuel feat. Roachford - "In The Moment"
- 2009 Seamus Haji & Dino Psaras - "My Destiny"
- 2010 Kaskade & Seamus Haji ft. Haley - "So Far Away"
- 2010 Seamus Haji V Mark Knight & Funkagenda - "Good Times"
- 2010 Seamus Haji and Romain Curtis Feat. Awa - "Just A Friend"
- 2012 EDX & Seamus Haji feat. Jerique - "Love Express"
- 2017 Seamus Haji & ATFC - "Right Track"
- 2018 Seamus Haji & Sammy Deuce - "Disco Crown"
- 2018 Seamus Haji & Sammy Deuce - "Celebrate Disco"
- 2018 Seamus Haji - "Give You Love"
- 2020 Seamus Haji feat. Kathy Brown - "A Better Place"
- 2020 Seamus Haji x Those Guys - "I Walk Alone (For Your Love)"
- 2020 Seamus Haji - "2000 Black"
- 2021 Seamus Haji featuring Mike Dunn - "Disco Dreams (Extended Mix)"

=== As other aliases ===
Allusion

- 2017 "Way Back"

Big Bang Theory

- 1997 "Stepping"
- When U Touch Me" (featuring Carolyn Harding)
- 1998 "All Nite EP"
- 1998 "All Nite EP Vol.2"
- 2001 "God's Child/Oh Yeah"
- 2002 "God's Child" (Re-release) - #51 UK Singles Chart
- 2003 "Do U Got Funk?" (featuring Derek Conyer)
- 2003 "Haven't Been Funked Enough"

Mekkah

- 2001 "I Got You" (featuring Bryan Chambers)
- 2002 "Race Of Survival" (featuring Stephen Granville)
- 2003 "Found A Love" (featuring Bryan Chambers)
- 2003 "Dimensions (I'm Happy)" (featuring Stephen Granville)

Get This!

- 2003 "Ya Underwear"
- 2003 "Work That Sucka"
- 2004 "Party People"

11th Dimension

- 2002 "Beat Goes On" (With Paul Emanuel)
- 2003 "The Force" (With Paul Emanuel)
- 2004 "The Rhythm" (With Paul Emanuel)

Heart & Soul

- 2003 "Share Your Love" (featuring Tommy Blaize)

Sonz Of Soul

- 1995 "Race Of Survival" (With Steve McCucheon)

Ijah

- 2004 "Love The Way U Move"
- 2007 "Nitelife" (featuring D'empress)

Undercover Lover

- 2009 "Who's Been Sleeping In My Bed?"

== Remixes ==
1993:

- Lisa Stansfield - "Little Bit of Heaven" (Seamus Haji Remix)

2003:

- Scape feat D'empress - "Be My Friend" (Seamus Haji Remix) Big Love

2005:

- Asle - "Golden Sun" (Seamus Haji & Paul Emmanuel Remix) - CR2
- Axwell featuring Tara McDonald - "Feel The Vibe (Til The Morning Comes)" (Seamus Haji Big Love Remix) - Data
- Dannii Minogue featuring The Soul Seekerz - "Perfection" (Seamus Haji & Paul Emmanuel remix)
- Late Night Alumni - "Empty Streets" (Haji & Emanuel Remix) - Hed Kandi

2006:

- Sugababes - "Easy" (Haji & Emanuel Remix) - Island
- Blu-ray featuring Jimmy Somerville - "You & Me" (Seamus Haji & Paul Emanuel Remix) - All Around The World
- Bon Garcon - Freak You (Seamus Haji & Paul Emanuel TD Edit)
- Booty Luv - "Boogie 2Nite" (Seamus Haji Big Love Remixes) - Hed Kandi
- Chanel - "My Life" (Seamus Haji Remix) - Hed Kandi
- Route 33 featuring Alex James - "Looking Back" (Seamus Haji & Paul Emanuel Remix) - Apollo/Universal

2007:

- Booty Luv - "Don't Mess with My Man" (Seamus Haji Big Love Remix) - Hed Kandi
- Calvin Harris - "Colours" (Seamus Haji Big Love Remix) - Columbia
- Ijah featuring D'Empress - "Nitelife" (Seamus Haji Big Love Remix) - Big Love Music
- J. Holiday - "Bed" (Seamus Haji Remix)
- Just Jack - "Writer's Block" (Seamus Haji Big Love Remix) - Mercury
- Mr Hudson & The Library - "Picture Of You" (Seamus Haji Remix) - Mercury
- Rihanna featuring Jay-Z - "Umbrella" (Seamus Haji & Paul Emanuel Remix) - Universal
- Róisín Murphy - "Overpowered" (Seamus Haji Remix) - EMI
- Stonebridge - "SOS" (Seamus Haji Remix) - Apollo/Stoney Boy
- One Night Only - "Just For Tonight" (Seamus Haji Remix)
- Orson - "Aint No Party" (Seamus Haji Remix) Mercury
- Brand New Heavies - "I Don't Know Why (I Love You)"
- DJ Pierre - "Destroy This Track" (Seamus Haji Remix) Big Love
- Mish Mash - "Speechless" - (Seamus Haji Remix) Data
- Paul Harris - "Find A Friend" (Seamus Haji Remix) Toolroom

2008:

- Mariah Carey - "Touch My Body" (Seamus Haji & Paul Emanuel Remix) - Universal
- Moby - "I Love To Move In Here" (Seamus Haji Big Love Remix) - Mute
- Rihanna - "Take a Bow" (Seamus Haji & Paul Emanuel Remix)
- One Night Only - "Just For Tonight" (Seamus Haji Remix) - Mercury
- Teamsters featuring Tara McDonald - "Shake It Off" (Seamus Haji Big Love Remix) - Positiva
- The Ting Tings - "Shut Up and Let Me Go" (Haji & Emanuel Remix) - Columbia
- Shakedown - "At Night" (Seamus Haji Remix)
- Brandy - "Right Here (Departed)" - (Seamus Haji & Paul Emanuel Remix)
- Robyn - "Who's That Girl" - (Seamus Haji Remix) Positiva
- Paul Harris & Cevin Fisher - "Deliver Me" (Seamus Haji Remix) Big Love

2009:

- Huggy - "Get Lifted" (Indian Summer) (Seamus Haji Vocal Mix)
- Brandy - "Right Here (Departed)" (Seamus Haji & Paul Emanuel Club Mix)
- Craig David - "Insomnia" (Haji & Emanuel Remix)
- The-Dream featuring Kanye West - "Walkin' On the Moon" (Seamus Haji & Paul Emanuel Club Mix)
- Utada - "Come Back to Me" (Seamus Haji & Paul Emanuel Remix) - Island Def Jam
- Mariah Carey - "Obsessed" (Seamus Haji & Paul Emanuel Remix)
- Carolina Liar - "Show Me What I'm Looking For" (Seamus Haji & Paul Emanuel Club Remix)
- Huggy & Dean Newton Feat Sam Obernik - "Get Lifted" (Seamus Haji Vocal Edit)
- Mika - "Rain" (Seamus Haji Big Love Remix)
- Sneaky Sound System - "It's Not My Problem" (Seamus Haji Remix)
- One Eskimo - "Hometime" (Seamus Haji Remix)
- Mimo - "Will You Be There" (Seamus Haji Remix) Mute
- Simply Red - "Money's Too Tight To Mention" (Seamus Haji & Paul Emanuel Remix)

2010:

- Craig David - "One More Lie (Standing In The Shadows)" (Seamus Haji & Paul Emanuel Remix)
- Estelle - "Fall In Love" (Seamus Haji Remix)
- Jamiroquai - "White Knuckle Ride" (Seamus Haji Remix) - Mercury
- Loick Essiene - "Love Drunk" (Seamus Haji & Paul Emanuel Remix)
- EmIi - "Mr Romeo" (Seamus Haji Remix) - EMI
- Tiffany Dunn - "Shut The Front Door (Got My Girls)"
- The Big Bang Club - "Chemistry" (Seamus Haji Remix)
- Kaci Battaglia - "Crazy Possessive" (Seamus Haji Extended Mix & Radio Edit) - Curb

2011:

- Late Night Alumni - "Empty Streets" (Haji & Emanuel Remix)
- Hurts - "Sunday"(Seamus Haji Club Mix & Radio Edit)
- Grace - "When The lights Go Down" (Seamus Haji Remix) Dream Merchant 21
- Dionne Bromfield - "Foolin'" (Seamus Haji Remix) - Universal
- Tatiana Okupnik- "Been A Fool" (Seamus Haji Remix) - Island
- Avi Elman and Danny J feat Nuwella - "Whats The Point" (Seamus Haji Remix)
- Donae'O - "I" (Seamus Haji Soul Love Mix)
- Jessie J - "Who You Are" (Seamus Haji Radio Mix)

2012:

- Carly Rae Jepsen - "This Kiss" (Seamus Haji Remix)
- Niki & The Dove - "DJ Ease My Mind" (Seamus Haji Remix)
- Maroon 5 – "One More Night" (Seamus Haji Remix)
- Rebecca Ferguson - "Too Good To Lose" (Seamus Haji Remix)
- Rita Ora featuring Tinie Tempah - "R.I.P" (Seamus Haji Remix)
- Scissor Sisters - "Shady Love" (Seamus Haji Dub Remix)
- Scissor Sisters - "F***" (Seamus Haji Remix)
- Jodie Connor featuring Busta Rhymes - "Take You There" (Seamus Haji Radio Edit)
- Jodie Connor featuring Busta Rhymes - "Take You There" (Seamus Haji Mix)
- Ke$ha - "Die Young" (Seamus Haji Radio Edit)
- Ke$ha - "Die Young" (Seamus Haji Extended Mix)
- Elton John vs. Pnau - "Sad" (Seamus Haji Remix)

2013:

- Amelia Lily - "Party Over" (Seamus Haji Club Mix)

2014:

- Paul Morrell Ft Mutya Buena - "Give Me Love" (Seamus Haji Club Mix)

2016:

- Somn3um - "Never" (Seamus Haji Remix)

2019:

- Seamus Haji - 'Changes' (Seamus Haji Re-Work)
- Belezamusica - 'All This Love That I'm Giving' (Seamus Haji Re-Work)
- Belezamusica 'U Got Me Spinning' (Seamus Haji 2019 Re-Work)
- Samo - (You Make Me) Feel So Good (Seamus Haji Remix)

2020:

- Bah Samba - "Portuguese Love" (Seamus Haji Extended Re-Work)

2022:

- DJ Meme - "I Can't Get You (Out Of My Mind)" (Seamus Haji Extended Remix)
