= Cherise (disambiguation) =

Cherise is another word for cherry.

Cherise can also refer to

- Cherise Adams-Burnett, a British vocalist, and winner of the 2020 Parliamentary Jazz Award for Jazz Vocalist of the Year
- Cherise Roberts (born 1982), an English singer and songwriter
  - Cherise & Nadia, an English dance pop group featuring Cherise Roberts and Nadia Shepherd
- Cherise Willeit (born 1989), a South African professional road cyclist
