= Boogie Tonight =

Boogie Tonight or variants may refer to:

- "Boogie 2nite", a 2002 song by Tweet
- Boogie 2nite (album), a 2007 album by Booty Luv
- "Boogie Tonight", by Claudja Barry, from the 1978 album I Wanna Be Loved by You
