= Boogie 2nite (album) =

Studio album by Booty Luv
- Released: 17 September 2007
- Genre: Dance
- Length: 48:30
- Label: Hed Kandi
- Producer: Seamus Haji; T&F; Moltosugo; Lee Daggar; Marc Jackson Burrows; Carl Ryden; Aaron McLelland; Ben Macklin; Pete Craigie; Sarita Borge

Singles from Boogie 2nite
- 1. "Boogie 2nite" Released: 20 November 2006; 2. "Shine" Released: 7 May 2007; 3. "Don't Mess with My Man" Released: 3 September 2007; 4. "Some Kinda Rush" Released: 19 November 2007; 5. "Dance Dance" Released: 11 November 2008

Professional ratings
Review scores
Source	Rating
About	5/5 stars
BBC Music	(positive)
Digital Spy	4/5 stars
Evening Standard	3/5 stars

Boogie 2nite is the debut studio album by the English duo Booty Luv, released on 17 September 2007 in the United Kingdom by Hed Kandi. The album went straight onto the charts at number eleven, and has since sold over 70,000 copies in the UK, being certified silver by the BPI. It was possible to pre-order signed copies of the album directly from the Ministry of Sound website.

The album contains Booty Luv's four hit singles (two top ten, two top twenty), five cover versions, and seven original tracks co-written by the two members themselves. In addition, there is an interactive component on the album which takes you to a website where you enter your details and can then watch the videos for the singles and a six-minute making-of special on the "Don't Mess with My Man" single.

On 5 August 2008 Boogie 2nite was released in the United States, containing the original twelve tracks, an exclusive bonus remix of "Shine" and a new colour scheme for the cover art (blue and green).

== Track listing ==
Boogie 2nite track listing
No.	Title	Writer(s)	Length
1.	"Boogie 2nite"	John Smith; Charlene Keys; Nisan Stewart	3:16
2.	"Shine"	James Harris III; Terry Lewis; Bernard Edwards; Nile Rodgers	3:25
3.	"Don't Mess with My Man"	Raphael Saadiq; Ali Shaheed Muhammad; Conesha Owens; Dawn Robinson	2:55
4.	"Some Kinda Rush"	Nadia Shepherd; Cherise Roberts; Carl Ryden; Samantha Powell	3:31
5.	"Dance, Dance"	Shepherd; Roberts; Ryden; Costandia Costi	3:07
6.	"Be Without You"	Mary J. Blige; Johnta Austin; Bryan-Michael Cox; Jason Perry	3:40
7.	"Who's That Girl"	Shepherd; Roberts; Ryden; Powell	3:03
8.	"Good Girl's Gone Bad"	Diane Warren	2:34
9.	"A Little Bit"	Jade Ewen; Cherise Leachman; Kenisha Pratt; Frederik Tao Nordsø Schjoldan; Azi Jegbefume Shalit	3:12
10.	"He's a Winner"	Shepherd; Roberts; Ryden; Powell	3:15
11.	"Something to Talk About"	Shepherd; Roberts; Ryden; Powell	3:23
12.	"Where You Are"	Rahsaan Patterson; Jamey Jaz	4:08

Bonus tracks
No.	Title	Length
13.	"Boogie 2nite" (DB Boulevard Edit)
14.	"Shine" (M's Smooth '54 Edit)
15.	"Don't Mess with My Man" (Ryden's Live Edit)

iTunes bonus track
No.	Title	Length
16.	"Some Kinda Rush" (Ryden's Live Edit)

U.S. bonus track
No.	Title	Length
17.	"Shine" (Passengerz Club Mix)

=== Covers ===
- "Boogie 2nite" – Tweet cover
- "Shine" – Luther Vandross cover
- "Don't Mess with My Man" – Lucy Pearl cover
- "Be Without You" – Mary J. Blige cover
- "Where You Are" – Rahsaan Patterson cover

== Charts ==
Chart (2007)	Peak position
UK Albums Chart	11

== Certifications ==
Certifications and sales for Boogie 2nite
Region	Certification	Certified units/sales
United Kingdom (BPI)	Silver	60,000^{^}
^{^} Shipments figures based on certification alone.
