= Southern Hummingbird =

Studio album by Tweet
- Released: April 2, 2002
- Studios: The Village Recorder (Los Angeles) (Note: Tracks 1–6, 10, 11 and 14); Trac Ken Place (Los Angeles) (Note: Track 4); Westlake Audio (West Hollywood, California) (Note: Tracks 7–9, 12, 13, 16 and 17); Manhattan Center (New York City) (Note: Tracks 13 and 16); The Hit Factory Criteria (Miami) (Note: Track 17); Nature's Finest (Los Angeles)
- Genres: R&B; soul; neo soul
- Length: 66:27
- Labels: Goldmind; Violator; Elektra
- Producers: Craig Brockman; Missy "Misdemeanor" Elliott; Troy Johnson; Jubu; Nisan Stewart; Timbaland; Tweet

Tweet chronology
Southern Hummingbird (2002)	It's Me Again (2005)

Singles from Southern Hummingbird
- 1. "Oops (Oh My)" Released: January 11, 2002; 2. "Call Me" Released: April 22, 2002; 3. "Boogie 2nite" Released: October 28, 2002

Southern Hummingbird is the debut studio album by American singer Tweet, released on April 2, 2002, by The Goldmind Inc. and Elektra Records. The album features production by Missy "Misdemeanor" Elliott, Timbaland, Craig Brockman, Nisan Stewart, guitarist John "Jubu" Smith, and Tweet herself. It also features guest vocals by Elliott, Bilal, and Ms. Jade, and included a bonus track performed by Elliott, "Big Spender", which samples the song of the same name from the 1966 musical Sweet Charity.

The album was met with positive reviews from music critics, who commended the album's musical direction and its lyrical content. The album debuted at number three on the Billboard 200, selling 195,000 copies in its first week. Southern Hummingbird was certified gold by the Recording Industry Association of America (RIAA) on April 30, 2002, and by September 2015, it had sold 897,000 units in the United States.

The album was preceded by lead single "Oops (Oh My)", which reached number seven on the Billboard Hot 100 and number one on the Hot R&B/Hip-Hop Songs chart. Southern Hummingbird also spawned the singles "Call Me" and "Boogie 2nite", as well as the promotional single "Smoking Cigarettes".

== Background ==
Tweet's career started in the mid-'90s as a member of the R&B trio Sugah. During this period, she met and formed a strong relationship with rapper and producer Missy Elliot; Elliot also introduced her to Timbaland, then building his reputation as a producer for artists such as Aaliyah. When Sugah broke up in the early 2000s, Tweet recruited Timbaland to help produce her debut solo album.

== Music and lyrics ==
This album is an irresistible blend of blues, rootsy soul, and soft acoustic rock, with poignant and heartfelt lyrical phrasing. A truly impressive debut album so expect more soulful humming from one of r&b's rising stars.

— Keyshia Davis, BBC Music

According to Keysha Davis from BBC Music, the album is a blend of blues, rootsy soul, and soft acoustic rock. Southern Hummingbird and Tweet were commended for creating a "mood in the room that might either make you want to take your clothes off or that of your significant others." Noting the album's musical style as groovy and "just feels good". Songs like "Smoking Cigarettes" were noticed for making the listener feel how Tweet feels. Tweet's voice was compared to the album's title with critics saying "she's not called the Southern Hummingbird for no reason", describing her vocals as "[s]oft, gentle, emotional and captivating".

Lyrically the album fixates on the opposite sex, noted by The A.V. Club for its lyrical "intensity that borders on pathological". The album opens with Tweet "writhing in a pit of suicidal despair", followed by themes of Tweet singing about chastised cheating men, pined for the commitment-phobic, offered to take back lovers, and generally behaved like a strong woman whose happiness is nevertheless dependent almost entirely on her romantic entanglements." The album's lyrics received large amounts of praise with reviewers say Tweet has a way with words continuing to say "songs like 'Beautiful' helped us understand how lyrics can move people."

The album's third song "Smoking Cigarettes" is described as a "lush, laid back affair" which incorporates "bluesy 70's soul" and multi-layered vocals, built over a snare drum. Lyrically the song is based on the idea of cigarette smoking being used as a coping mechanism. "Best Friend", featuring American singer Bilal, displays "lilting strings, exquisite vocals and heartbeat bass" noted for its use of "grassroots soul". "Boogie 2nite" is a "feel-good" song that contains a repetitive "funky guitar riff" with lyrics discussing the "party vibe". "Oops (Oh My)" is noted for its lyrical content which can be interpreted as discussing "female masturbation or a tribute to self-love." The song is built around a "superb groove" noted for its unmistakable Timbaland production. The song also contains "quick syncopated rhythms and Tweet's raspy vocals." "Drunk" is an atmospheric song that continues to take influence from the idea of intoxicants, in the same vein as "Smoking Cigarettes". Lyrically the song sees Tweet broken and alone with only the aid of alcohol for company.

== Singles ==
"Oops (Oh My)", featuring Missy "Misdemeanor" Elliott, was released as the album's lead single in January 2002. The song was a commercial success, reaching number seven on the US Billboard Hot 100, number one on the US Billboard's Hot R&B/Hip-Hop Songs chart, and number five on the UK Singles Chart.

"Call Me" was released as the second single in April 2002. It peaked at number 31 on the Billboard Hot 100 and at number nine on the Hot R&B/Hip-Hop Songs chart, becoming Tweet's second consecutive top-10 entry on the latter chart. The track also reached number 35 in the United Kingdom.

The album's third and final single, "Boogie 2nite", was released solely in Europe in October 2002. After English dance music duo Booty Luv released a cover version of the track in November 2006, Tweet's original song charted at number 167 in the UK that same month.

== Critical reception ==
Professional ratings
Aggregate scores
Source	Rating
Metacritic	73/100
Review scores
Source	Rating
AllMusic	4/5 stars
The A.V. Club	A
Robert Christgau	(choice cut)
Dotmusic	7/10
Entertainment Weekly	C+
The Guardian	4/5 stars
NME	3/5 stars
Rolling Stone	2.5/5 stars
Slant Magazine	4/5 stars

Southern Hummingbird received generally positive reviews from music critics. At Metacritic, which assigns a normalized rating out of 100 to reviews from mainstream publications, the album received an average score of 73, based on 10 reviews. Stephen Thomas Erlewine of AllMusic praised the album's musical direction and production, but felt that Tweet was fading into the mix. The A.V. Club praised the album's lyrical content and Tweet's "sultry" vocals, continuing to say, "Tweet recognizes the value of subtlety and understatement, but she also skillfully writes and produces or co-produces much of her own material." BBC Music gave Southern Hummingbird described the album as "the stuff of real divas," adding that "Tweet's inherent melancholy further confirms the musical rite of passage in the tradition of other soul greats such as Aretha, Mary J Blige and Billie Holiday," while The New York Times called Southern Hummingbird a "strong debut album."

Dotmusic commended Tweet's vocals saying she has the "kind of voice that doesn't overpower her music but lets it breathe." Entertainment Weekly gave the album a mixed review noting that the album's production was a highlight which helped to showcase her "breathy coo", while praising the "well-crafted" the critics felt the album contained "too-similar ballads." Imran Ahmed of NME gave a positive reception towards the album's production and musical style saying the album is a "rarely thrilling collection of R&B"; however, he felt the album lacked front to back cohesiveness. Rolling Stone felt that "Oops" and "Make Ur Move" were highlights of the album, noting them for making "this hummingbird [fly]." PopMatters found that "surprisingly, [the album] is not Missy and Timbaland's playground [...] Point being, different music serves different purposes. Southern Hummingbird is best serve with wine, that special someone, and candles. It goes down better if you concentrate more on her charming voice and the tracks, rather what she is actually saying."

== Commercial performance ==
Southern Hummingbird debuted at number three on the US Billboard 200, selling 195,000 copies in its first week. The album was certified gold by the Recording Industry Association of America (RIAA) on April 30, 2002, and had sold 897,000 copies in the United States as of September 2015. The album also fared well in European territories, peaking at number 15 on the UK Albums Chart.

== Track listing ==
No.	Title	Writer(s)	Producer(s)	Length
1.	"So Much to Say (Intro)"	Charlene Keys; Nisan Stewart; Craig Brockman	Stewart; Brockman	1:24
2.	"My Place"	Keys; Stewart; Brockman	Stewart; Brockman	4:24
3.	"Smoking Cigarettes"	Keys; Stewart; Brockman	Tweet; Stewart^{[a]}; Brockman^{[a]}	4:16
4.	"Best Friend" (featuring Bilal)	Keys; Stewart; Brockman; Bilal Oliver	Tweet; Stewart^{[a]}; Brockman^{[a]}	5:08
5.	"Always Will"	Keys; Stewart; John Smith	Jubu; Stewart	4:41
6.	"Boogie 2nite"	Keys; Stewart; Smith	Jubu; Stewart	4:10
7.	"Oops (Oh My)" (featuring Missy "Misdemeanor" Elliott)	Keys; Elliott	Timbaland	3:58
8.	"Make Ur Move"	Keys; Timothy Mosley	Timbaland	3:49
9.	"Motel"	Keys; Susan Weems; Bernard Edwards; Nile Rodgers	Tweet	3:48
10.	"Beautiful"	Keys; Brockman	Brockman	4:05
11.	"Complain"	Keys; Stewart; Brockman; Weems	Tweet; Stewart^{[a]}; Brockman^{[a]}	5:14
12.	"Heaven"	Keys; Stewart; Brockman	Tweet; Brockman^{[a]}; Timbaland^{[a]}	3:39
13.	"Call Me"	Keys; Elliott	Timbaland	2:56
14.	"Drunk"	Keys; Stewart; Brockman	Tweet; Brockman^{[a]}	5:25
15.	"Southern Hummingbird (Outro)"	Keys; Brockman		1:31
16.	"Sexual Healing (Oops Pt. 2)" (featuring Ms. Jade)	Keys; Mosley; Chevon Young	Timbaland	4:47
17.	"Big Spender" (bonus track, performed by Missy "Misdemeanor" Elliott)	Elliott; Troy Johnson	Elliott; Johnson	3:12

Japanese edition bonus track
No.	Title	Writer(s)	Length
15.	"Get Away (Move On)" (placed between "Drunk" and "Southern Hummingbird (Outro)")	Keys; Stewart; Brockman	4:22

=== Notes ===
- ^{^[a]} signifies an additional producer

=== Sample credits ===
- "Motel" contains a sample of "Rapper's Delight" by The Sugarhill Gang.
- "Big Spender" contains a sample of "Big Spender" from Sweet Charity. The song appears only on initial pressings of the album.

== Personnel ==
Credits adapted from the liner notes of Southern Hummingbird.

=== Musicians ===
- Tweet – vocals (tracks 1–16)
- Lil Charlie – lead guitar (tracks 2, 4)
- John "Jubu" Smith – guitar (track 3)
- Bilal – vocals (track 4)
- Dontae – bass (track 4)
- Missy "Misdemeanor" Elliott – vocals (tracks 7, 17)
- Greg Leiz – steel guitar (track 11)
- Ms. Jade – rap (track 16)

=== Technical ===
- Nisan Stewart – production (tracks 1, 2, 5, 6); additional production (tracks 3, 4, 11)
- Craig Brockman – production (tracks 1, 2, 10); additional production (tracks 3, 4, 11, 12, 14)
- Dylan Dresdow – engineering, mixing (tracks 1–6, 9–12, 14)
- Tweet – production (tracks 3, 4, 9, 11, 12, 14); executive production
- John "Jubu" Smith – production (tracks 5, 6)
- Timbaland – production (tracks 7, 8, 13, 16); additional production (track 12); executive production
- Jimmy Douglass – engineering (tracks 7, 8, 12, 13, 16); mixing (tracks 7, 8, 13, 16)
- Tyson Leeper – engineering (tracks 16, 17)
- Missy "Misdemeanor" Elliott – production (track 17); executive production
- Troy Johnson – production (track 17)
- Carlos Bedoya – engineering (track 17)
- Manny Marroquin – mixing (track 17)
- Bernie Grundman – mastering

=== Artwork ===
- Ruvén Afanador – photography
- Anita Marisa Boriboon – art direction, design

== Charts ==
=== Weekly charts ===
Weekly chart performance for Southern Hummingbird
Chart (2002)	Peak position
Australian Urban Albums (ARIA)	18
Canadian Albums (Nielsen SoundScan)	43
Canadian R&B Albums (Nielsen SoundScan)	9
Dutch Albums (Album Top 100)	65
European Albums (Music & Media)	53
French Albums (SNEP)	101
German Albums (Offizielle Top 100)	44
New Zealand Albums (RMNZ)	32
Norwegian Albums (VG-lista)	13
Scottish Albums (Official Charts)	33
Swedish Albums (Sverigetopplistan)	35
Swiss Albums (Schweizer Hitparade)	65
UK Albums (Official Charts)	15
UK R&B Albums (Official Charts)	3
US Billboard 200	3
US Top R&B/Hip-Hop Albums (Billboard)	2

=== Year-end charts ===
Year-end chart performance for Southern Hummingbird
Chart (2002)	Position
Canadian R&B Albums (Nielsen SoundScan)	74
US Billboard 200	93
US Top R&B/Hip-Hop Albums (Billboard)	18

== Certifications ==
Certifications for Southern Hummingbird
Region	Certification	Certified units/sales
United Kingdom (BPI)	Silver	60,000^{^}
United States (RIAA)	Gold	897,000
^{^} Shipments figures based on certification alone.

== Release history ==
Release history for Southern Hummingbird
Region	Date	Label	Ref.
United States	April 2, 2002	The Goldmind; Elektra	
Japan	April 10, 2002	Warner	
Australia	May 13, 2002	Warner	
United Kingdom	May 13, 2002	Elektra	
Germany	May 27, 2002	Warner	
