= Light in the Dark =

Light in the Dark or variants may refer to:

== Film and TV ==
- The Light in the Dark, 1922 film starring Lon Chaney
- "Light in the Dark" (The Legend of Korra), a 2013 episode of The Legend of Korra
- Light In The Dark (film), 2019 film by Ekene Som Mekwunye

== Music ==
=== Albums ===
- Light in the Dark, album by trumpeter Claudio Roditi 2004
- Light In The Dark, album by Danetra Moore 2015
- A Light in the Dark, album by Metal Church 2006
- A Light in the Dark (4 P.M. album), 1997
- Lights in the Dark, album by Katie McMahon and Hector Zazou 1998
- Light in the Dark (Revolution Saints album), 2017, or the title track

=== Songs ===
- "Light in the Dark" (Kate Ryan song), 2013
- "A Light in the Dark", song by Loudness from Eve to Dawn
- "Light In the Dark", song by Fair Warning from Go!
- "Light in the Dark", song by John Entwistle from The Rock
- "Light in the Dark", song by American heavy metal band Chastain from For Those Who Dare 1990
- "Light In The Dark", song by Regine Vasquez from Regine

== See also ==
- Light in the Darkness, a 1941 Italian drama film
