= Dance, Dance (Booty Luv song) =

"Dance Dance"

Single by Booty Luv

from the album Boogie 2Nite
- Released: 11 November 2008 (download); 17 November 2008 (physical)
- Recorded: 2007
- Genre: Dance-pop; nu-disco; house
- Length: 3:07
- Label: Hed Kandi; Spinnin'
- Songwriter(s): Nadia Shepherd; Cherise Roberts; Carl Ryden; Costandia Costi
- Producer(s): Carl Ryden

Booty Luv singles chronology
| "Some Kinda Rush" (2007) | "Dance Dance" (2008) | "Say It" (2009) |

"Dance Dance" is the fifth and final single by British dance duo Booty Luv from their debut album Boogie 2Nite. It is the second original single release from the duo, with songwriting credits from both group members, Nadia and Cherise. It was released in the Netherlands on 11 November 2008, but was not released in the United Kingdom.

== Track listing ==
CD

1. "Dance Dance" – 3:07
2. "Dance Dance" (Hardwell Remix) – 7:07
3. "Booty Luv Megamix" – 4:44

== Charts ==
The single was a club hit on the Netherlands, where peaked at number 5 on the Club Chart, and at number 27 on the Singles Chart.

| Chart (2008) | Peak position |
|---|---|
| Dutch Top 40 | 27 |
