= The Soul Seekers =

American gospel music group

- Origin: Los Angeles, California, United States
- Genres: gospel
- Years active: 2000–present
- Labels: GospoCentric, My Block, RCA Inspiration, Sovereign
- Members: Charlie Bereal; Craig Brockman; Johnteris Tate; Warryn Campbell; Gerald Haddon; Eric Seats; John Smith; Nisan Stewart
- Past members: Teddy Campbell

The Soul Seekers is an American gospel music group signed to RCA Inspiration, through their affiliation with GospoCentric Records. The group consist of ten members, who are the following; Charlie Bereal, Craig Brockman, Johnteris Tate, Warryn Campbell, Teddy Campbell, Gerald Haddon, Eric Seats, John "Jubu" Smith, Chris Payton, the and Nisan Stewart. In September 2000, the group started with a performance at Stewart's fathers church in Los Angeles that's Greater Emmanuel Temple Church. The first album came out in 2005, with GospoCentric and My Block Records, The Soul Seekers, and this would chart on the Billboard Gospel Albums chart. Their follow-up album released in 2010, Soul Seekers II, which charted on the aforementioned chart, along with the Heatseekers Albums chart.

== Background ==
The Los Angeles, California-based gospel group, The Soul Seekers started in 2000, with some spontaneously improvised performances at Greater Emmanuel Temple Church, where Nisan Stewart's father was the pastor and bishop, Carl Stewart. These performances would become an annual tradition for the community, and those were called "'Take Me Back Night'" concerts. This group has eight members; Charlie Bereal, Craig Brockman, Teddy Campbell, Warryn Campbell, Gerald Haddon, Eric Seats, John "Jubu" Smith, and Nisan Stewart.

== Music history ==
Even though, the group got its start in September 2000, it was not until, April 19, 2005, that they released their debut studio album with GospoCentric Records and My Block Records, The Soul Seekers. This album would succeed in charting on the Billboard Gospel Albums at No. 37. Their second studio album released on November 16, 2010, Soul Seekers II, this time with My Block and Sovereign Records. The album would again chart on the Gospel Albums chart, but this time higher at No. 11, while it also charted on the Heatseekers Albums at No. 12. This album would receive a three star review from AllMusic's William Ruhlmann, yet it would get a seven out of ten review by Cross Rhythms' Donna Marshall.

== Members ==
- Teddy Campbell – lead vocals
- Warryn Campbell – bass guitar and vocals
- Nisan Stewart – founder and vocals
- Gerald Haddon – vocals
- John "Jubu" Smith – guitar and vocals
- Charlie Bereal – guitar
- Eric Seats – drums
- Craig Brockman – organ

== Discography ==
List of studio albums, with selected chart positions
Title	Album details	Peak chart positions	
Title	Album details	US Gos	US Heat
The Soul Seekers	Released: April 19, 2005; Label: GospoCentric/My Block; CD, digital download	37	–
Soul Seekers II	Released: November 16, 2010; Label: My Block/Sovereign; CD, digital download	11	12
