= Say It (Booty Luv song) =

Single by Booty Luv
- B-side: "Say It" (Warren Clarke Vocal Mix)
- Released: 31 August 2009
- Recorded: 2008; Hed Kandi Studios (London, England)
- Genre: Dance-pop
- Length: 3:00 (radio edit); 3:17 (official UK version)
- Label: Hed Kandi
- Songwriters: Carl Björsell; Didrik Thott; Sebastian Thott
- Producer: Wez Clarke

Booty Luv singles chronology
"Dance Dance" (2008)	"Say It" (2009)	"This Night" (2011)

Music video
- "Say It" on YouTube

"Say It" is a song by female English dance music duo Booty Luv. The song was written by Carl Björsell, Didrik Thott, Sebastian Thott and produced by Wez Clarke. It was released as the duo's sixth official single and the first single from their unfinished and unreleased second album. The song premiered on BBC Radio 1 on 10 April 2009. The single was then released four months later on 31 August 2009 through recording label Hed Kandi. "Say It" is an up-tempo song and has prominent dance and electronic dance characteristics. The song's lyrics evoke situations of lust and seduction whilst out at a club. The song garnered commercial success for Booty Luv in the United Kingdom, where it reached a chart peak of number 16, becoming the group's fifth consecutive top twenty hit on this chart and at the same time outpeaking previous UK single "Some Kinda Rush."

A hotel/casino party-themed music video directed by Emile Nava, to "Say It" was released on 23 July 2009. The duo promoted the song by performing it on various television shows and at various venues, of which included GMTV and Sony Ericsson's Dance Nation Festival.

This was planned to be the first single off the band's second studio album Say It Now, which was scheduled for release in November 2009, but due to the low chart placing of "Say It", the album was eventually cancelled.

== Background ==
"Say It" was written by Carl Björsell, Didrik Thott and Sebastian Thott. It was produced and mixed by Wez Clarke and co-produced by Airborn, all of whom had worked on tracks for the likes of Westlife, Delta Goodrem and Lindsay Lohan. Backing vocals were courtesy of Jeanette Olsson and the track was recorded by Booty Luv at Hed Kandi Studios in London.

The song takes on a more electro sound compared to previous songs, as Cherise Roberts described the track's sound inspiration in an interview: "We're trying to go for a new kind of sound, but not too different. We just want to show progression."

The song was composed in a key of C sharp minor and runs at a tempo of 126.96 beats per minute. The song was produced with consistence of various drum and bass and electronica instrumentation. In addition to sirens, synthesisers and vocoders.

In an interview with Digital Spy, Roberts explained the lyrical concept behind "Say It:"

It's so straightforward we hardly need to explain it! Sometimes you go to a club, catch a guy's eye and have an immediate connection with him. It gets to the end of the night and you're like 'Oh, I wish he'd said something to me'. The song's basically saying, 'If you've got something to say, come and say it before it's too late'.

== Reception ==
The single received positive reviews from music critics alike.

Nick Levine of Digital Spy described the "Cracker" as "Working more of an electro sound in its verses but the surging chorus and sassy lyrics are business as usual for the dance-pop duo." About.com said "Say It", their song of the day for 28 September, "moves more in the electro direction while maintaining the pophouse feel that we all love them for." Popjustice deemed the song as "amazing." Kickinthepeanuts reviewed the song as being "a big, loud, dancey, amazing, rather gay-night-club-sounding banga."

== Music video ==
The music video for "Say It" was first shown on 23 July on UK music channels, and was directed by Emile Nava.

=== Synopsis ===
It shows the girls arriving at a posh hotel. The girls first spot men as they enter the hotel lobby and move to their suite. The girls then head downstairs to a mini casino where they gamble. The girls are then seen against various backgrounds and laying on chairs. Finally, the girls have a party in their hotel room and invite their friends and some men to their hotel rooms, before sending them away.

== Chart performance ==
=== Weekly charts ===
Chart (2009)	Peak position
CIS Airplay (TopHit)	15
Russia Airplay (TopHit)	21
Scotland (OCC)	9
UK Singles (OCC)	16

=== Year-end charts ===
Chart (2009)	Position
CIS (TopHit)	134
Russia Airplay (TopHit)	119
