= It's Me Again =

Studio album by Tweet
- Released: March 21, 2005
- Studio: The Hit Factory Criteria, Miami (Note: Tracks 1–14 and "We Don't Need No Water"); Audio Vision, North Miami (Note: Tracks 2, 5, 8, 9 and 13); Universal Publishing, Los Angeles (Note: Tracks 3 and 14); Quad, New York City (Note: Track 4); Conjunction, Los Angeles; Studio City Sound, Studio City, California (Note: "When I Need a Man")
- Length: 63:16
- Label: Goldmind; Violator; Atlantic
- Producer: Missy Elliott (also exec.); Tweet (also co-exec.); Charlie Bereal; Kenneth Bereal; Craig Brockman; Marty Cintron III; Kwamé; Madball Entertainment; Walter Millsap III; Steve Plunkett; Spencer Proffer; Soul Diggaz; Nisan Stewart; Timbaland

Tweet chronology
Southern Hummingbird (2002)	It's Me Again (2005)	The Dresden Soul Symphony (2008)

Singles from It's Me Again
- 1. "Turn da Lights Off" Released: October 5, 2004

It's Me Again is the second studio album by American singer Tweet. It was released on March 21, 2005, by The Goldmind Inc. and Atlantic Records. The album debuted at number 17 on the US Billboard 200 with first-week sales of 55,000 copies.

== Singles ==
Proposals for the album's lead single dates back to early 2004, where MTV reported that the Missy Elliott-produced "Shook Up", featuring former 106 & Park co-host Free, was in consideration for a lead single choice. However, complications from the merging between Elektra Records and Atlantic prevented the song's release, resulting in the song's cancellation and a pushback date for Tweet's It's Me Again album.

On October 5, 2004, "Turn da Lights Off" was released and began to appear on numerous mixtapes to help spread the word of the song's release. A promotional remix featuring 50 Cent and an alternate line by Missy Elliott was also released to mixtapes in order to generate further buzz for the single. Commercially, the single was unsuccessful in the United States, where it reached number eight on the US Bubbling Under Hot 100 Singles chart and number 39 on the Hot R&B/Hip-Hop Songs chart. However, the song fared well on the UK Singles Chart, peaking at number 29.

== Critical reception ==
Professional ratings
Aggregate scores
Source	Rating
Metacritic	60/100
Review scores
Source	Rating
AllMusic	3/5 stars
Blender	3/5 stars
Entertainment Weekly	B−
The Guardian	3/5 stars
PopMatters	6/10
Rolling Stone	1/5 stars
Slant Magazine	3/5 stars
Stylus Magazine	B
Vibe	4/5 marks
Yahoo! Music	5/10 stars

It's Me Again was met with generally mixed reviews. At Metacritic, which assigns a normalized rating out of 100 to reviews from professional publications, the album received an average score of 60, based on 13 reviews. Charles Merwin from Stylus Magazine found that It's Me Again was "a much smoother ride and more cohesive entity" than Southern Hummingbird. He called the album "one of the year's strongest efforts." Billboard editor Gail Mitchell noted that while Tweet's debut album "overall carried a darker, somber tone, It's Me Again finds a more self-satisfied and confident Tweet embarking on a new chapter in her life, one where her brightened outlook overrides the bad and moves forward." Caroline Sullivan from The Guardian remarked that Tweet's "buttercream vocals prove that less is much more." Vibe editor Laura Checkoway wrote: "Built on her signature melancholy foundation, Tweet’s inspiring sophomore reintroduction, It's Me Again, is stacked solid with songs that chronicle her ongoing struggles through love’s many stages."

The New York Times critic Kelefa Sanneh found that It's Me Again was "more proof that Tweet, a protégée of Missy Elliott, remains a radically sensual singer. The album is full of hushed singing and weird little musical details that you don't hear so much as feel. Unfortunately, the songs aren't always as good as the sounds, but the best ones are dazzling." Slant Magazine critic Sal Cinquemani wrote that the album "doesn't stray too far from the formula of Tweet’s stellar debut: cool, acoustic-driven midtempo ballads with a few club bangers thrown in for good measure [but] This time, though, the club tracks are a bit less immediate and the slower songs [...] don't distinguish themselves from one another the way they did on Southern Hummingbird."

Entertainment Weekly's Raymond Fiore found that It's Me Again had "lesser peaks and deeper valleys than its predecessor. Tweet's vocal collages can still make for seductive mood pieces, but too many of these fluttering tunes never quite get off the ground." Christian Hoard from Rolling Stone wrote that much "of the album shuffles between romantic ecstasy and agony with tempos crawling and Tweet stretching out lush melodies till they're barely recognizable." It's Me Again, doesn't stray too far from the formula of Tweet's stellar debut: cool, acoustic-driven midtempo ballads with a few club bangers thrown in for good measure, including the fun and funky “Sports, Sex & Food” and the discofied “Things I Don’t Mean.” This time, though, the club tracks are a bit less immediate and the slower songs, particularly “Small Change” and “I’m Done,” don't distinguish themselves from one another the way they did on Southern Hummingbird.

== Commercial performance ==
It's Me Again debuted at number 17 on the US Billboard 200 and number two on the Top R&B/Hip-Hop Albums chart, selling 55,000 copies in its first week.

== Track listing ==
It's Me Again track listing
No.	Title	Writer(s)	Producer(s)	Length
1.	"Intro (It's Me Again)"	Charlene Keys; Craig Brockman	Brockman	1:36
2.	"Turn da Lights Off" (featuring Missy Elliott)	Elliott; Kwamé Holland; Edgar DeLange; Emil Newman; Herbert Spencer; Marvin Gaye	Elliott; Kwamé	4:50
3.	"Iceberg"	Keys; Nisan Stewart; Brockman; Charles Bereal	Tweet; Stewart^{[a]}; Brockman^{[a]}; C. Bereal^{[a]}	5:06
4.	"Could It Be" (featuring Rell)	Keys; Rell; Walter Millsap III	Millsap	4:24
5.	"You"	Keys; Elliott; LaShaun Owens; Karriem Mack; Hoagy Carmichael; Mitchell Parish	Elliott; Soul Diggaz	4:32
6.	"Cab Ride"	Bob James	Stewart; Brockman	3:29
7.	"Things I Don't Mean" (featuring Missy Elliott)	Elliott; Brockman; C. Bereal	Elliott; Brockman; C. Bereal	3:02
8.	"My Man"	Keys; Stewart; Brockman; Corté Ellis	Elliott; Stewart; Brockman	4:00
9.	"Sports, Sex & Food"	Elliott; Harold Lilly; Owens; Mack; Leo Nocentelli; Art Neville; George Porter Jr.; Joseph Modeliste	Elliot; Soul Diggaz; Madball Entertainment^{[a]}	3:20
10.	"Small Change"	Keys; Stewart; Brockman	Stewart; Brockman	4:30
11.	"Two of Us" (featuring Tashawna)	Keys; Stewart; Brockman; C. Bereal; Kenneth Bereal	Stewart; Brockman; C. Bereal; K. Bereal	3:19
12.	"Where Do We Go from Here?"	Keys; C. Bereal; K. Bereal; Marty Cintron III	C. Bereal; K. Bereal; Cintron	3:14
13.	"Steer"	Keys; Elliott; Timothy Mosley; Stewart; C. Bereal; Ellis	Elliott; Timbaland; Stewart; C. Bereal	3:37
14.	"I'm Done"	Keys; Stewart; Brockman; Garry Glenn	Stewart; Brockman	5:17
15.	"We Don't Need No Water"	Elliott; Holland; Brockman; Gregory Wigfall; Richard Fowler; Charles Pettiford; Celite Evans; Jerry Bloodrock; Ric Wilson; Lou Wilson; Carlos Wilson	Elliott; Kwamé^{[a]}; Brockman^{[a]}	6:19
16.	"When I Need a Man" (hidden bonus track, added onto the end of track 15)	Spencer Proffer; Steve Plunkett	Proffer; Plunkett; Mona Scott^{[b]}	2:50

Australian and Japanese edition bonus track
No.	Title	Writer(s)	Producer(s)	Length
16.	"Turn da Lights Off" (remix; featuring Missy Elliott)	Elliott; Holland; DeLange; Newman; Spencer; Gaye	Elliott; Kwamé	3:27

Notes

- ^{^[a]} signifies a co-producer.
- ^{^[b]} signifies an executive producer.
- Track 15 contains the hidden track "When I Need a Man" from the USA Network original series Kojak, starring Ving Rhames.

Sample credits

- "Turn da Lights Off" contains a sample of "Lost April" by Nat King Cole and portions of "If This World Were Mine" by Marvin Gaye and Tammi Terrell.
- "You" contains portions of "Stardust" by Louis Armstrong.
- "Cab Ride" contains material from the Taxi theme song "Angela" by Bob James.
- "Sports, Sex & Food" contains a sample of "Hey Pocky A-Way" by The Meters.
- "I'm Done" contains a sample of "Intimate Friends" by Eddie Kendricks.
- "We Don't Need No Water" contains an interpolation of "The Roof Is on Fire" by Rock Master Scott & the Dynamic Three and a sample of "Mango Meat" by Mandrill.

== Personnel ==
Credits adapted from the liner notes of It's Me Again.

=== Musicians ===
- Tweet – vocals
- Missy Elliott – vocals (tracks 2, 7, "We Don't Need No Water")
- Cesare Turner – horn (tracks 3, 9, 14)
- Rell – vocals (track 4)
- John "Jubu" Smith – bass (tracks 6, 10); guitar (tracks 10, 14)
- Soul Diggaz – drum programming (track 7); additional percussion ("When I Need a Man")
- Charlie Bereal – guitar (track 8, 11–13)
- Tashawna – vocals (track 11)
- Craig Brockman – keyboards (track 12)
- Marty Cintron III – acoustic guitar (track 12)
- Nisan Stewart – drums (track 12)
- Josh Freese – drums ("When I Need a Man")
- LamTrak Productions – additional drum programming ("When I Need a Man")
- Michael Parnell – bass ("When I Need a Man")
- Steve Plunkett – arrangement, guitar ("When I Need a Man")
- Spencer Proffer – arrangement, keyboards ("When I Need a Man")

=== Technical ===
- Craig Brockman – production (tracks 1, 6–8, 10, 11, 14); co-production (track 3, "We Don't Need No Water")
- Dylan "3D" Dresdow – recording, mixing (tracks 1, 6, 7, 10–12)
- Missy Elliott – production (tracks 2, 5, 7–9, 13, "We Don't Need No Water"); executive production
- Kwamé – production (track 2); co-production ("We Don't Need No Water")
- Mike Rivera – recording (tracks 2, 8, 9)
- Jimmy Douglass – mixing (tracks 2, 3, 5, 7–9, 11–14, "We Don't Need No Water")
- Carlos Bedoya – additional recording (tracks 2–5, 7–9, 13, 14, "We Don't Need No Water"); mixing (tracks 2, 3, 5, 7–9, 11–14, "We Don't Need No Water"); recording ("We Don't Need No Water")
- Dave Heuer – additional recording (tracks 2–5, 7–9, 13, 14, "We Don't Need No Water")
- Patrick Magee – mixing assistance (tracks 2, 3, 5, 7–9, 11, 13–14, "We Don't Need No Water")
- Marcella Araica – tracking engineering assistance (tracks 2, 5–9, 12–14, "We Don't Need No Water"); mixing assistance (tracks 6, 10, 11)
- Tweet – production (track 3); co-executive production
- Nisan Stewart – co-production (track 3); production (tracks 6, 8, 10, 11, 13, 14)
- Charlie Bereal – co-production (track 3); production (tracks 7, 11–13)
- Stan Malveaux – recording (tracks 3, 14)
- Walter Millsap III – production, recording, mixing (track 4)
- Soul Diggaz – production (track 5, 9)
- Israel "PT" Najera – recording (tracks 5, 8, 13)
- Madball Entertainment – co-production (track 9)
- Kenneth Bereal – production (track 11)
- Marty Cintron III – production (track 12)
- Javier Valverde – mixing assistance (track 12)
- Timbaland – production (track 13)
- Spencer Proffer – production ("When I Need a Man")
- Steve Plunkett – production ("When I Need a Man")
- Mona Scott – executive production ("When I Need a Man")
- Tom Weir – recording ("When I Need a Man")
- Paul Falcone – mixing ("When I Need a Man")
- Herb Powers Jr. – mastering

=== Artwork ===
- Anita Marisa Boriboon – art direction, design
- Antti J. – cover photography
- Mark Liddell – photography
- Arnold Turner – additional package photos
- Andrew Zach – Atlantic art production

== Charts ==
Chart (2005)	Peak position
Swedish Albums (Sverigetopplistan)	50
UK Albums (OCC)	158
UK R&B Albums (OCC)	21
US Billboard 200	17
US Top R&B/Hip-Hop Albums (Billboard)	2

== Release history ==
Region	Date	Label	Ref.
United Kingdom	March 21, 2005	Elektra	
United States	March 22, 2005	The Goldmind; Atlantic	
Japan	March 24, 2005	Warner	
Germany	April 25, 2005	Warner	
Australia	May 13, 2005	Warner	
