= Boogie 2nite =

2002 single by Tweet

Single by Tweet

from the album Southern Hummingbird
- B-side: "Smoking Cigarettes"
- Released: October 28, 2002
- Studio: Village Recorder (West Los Angeles, California)
- Genre: Disco
- Length: 4:10
- Label: Elektra
- Songwriters: Charlene Keys; Nisan Stewart; John Smith
- Producers: Jubu; Nisan Stewart

Tweet singles chronology
| "No Panties" (2002) | "Boogie 2nite" (2002) | "Thugman" (2003) |

"Boogie 2nite" is a song by American singer Tweet from her debut studio album, Southern Hummingbird (2002). Tweet co-wrote the song with its producers, Nisan Stewart and John "Jubu" Smith. It was released on October 28, 2002, as the album's third and final single. The single's B-side, "Smoking Cigarettes", was also released as a promotional CD single. A music video for "Boogie 2nite" and "Smoking Cigarettes" was directed by Little X and filmed in Toronto over the weekend of September 28–29, 2002, but it was ultimately cancelled. "Boogie 2nite" was included on the soundtrack to the 2002 action thriller film The Transporter.

In 2006, the song was covered by English dance music duo Booty Luv, whose version peaked at number two on the UK Singles Chart. Following the release of Booty Luv's cover, Tweet's original song reached number 167 on the UK chart.

== Track listings ==
- UK CD single
1. "Boogie 2nite" (album version) – 4:10
2. "Boogie 2nite" (T&F Crushed DB Boulevard Club Re-edit) – 6:08
3. "Smoking Cigarettes" (album version) – 4:17
- UK 12-inch single

A1. "Boogie 2nite" (album version) – 4:10
A2. "Boogie 2nite" (T&F Crushed DB Boulevard Club Re-edit) – 6:08
B. "Smoking Cigarettes" (album version) – 4:17

- UK 12-inch single – remixes

A. "Boogie 2nite" (Seamus Haji Boogie Mix) – 7:45
B1. "Boogie 2nite" (Seamus Haji 2nite Dub) – 7:48
B2. "Boogie 2nite" (a cappella) - 4:57

- Italian 12-inch single

A. "Boogie 2nite" (T&F Crushed DB Boulevard Dub)
B1. "Boogie 2nite" (T&F Crushed DB Boulevard Radio)
B2. "Boogie 2nite" (album version)

== Personnel ==
Personnel are adapted from the liner notes of Southern Hummingbird.

- Tweet – songwriting, vocals
- Dylan Dresdow – engineering, mixing
- Bernie Grundman – mastering
- John "Jubu" Smith – production, songwriting
- Nisan Stewart – production, songwriting

== Charts ==
Weekly chart performance for "Boogie 2nite"
| Chart (2002) | Peak position |
|---|---|
| UK Singles (OCC) | 167 |

== Release history ==
Release dates and formats for "Boogie 2nite"
| Region | Date | Format | Label | Ref. |
|---|---|---|---|---|
| United Kingdom | October 28, 2002 | CD single | Elektra | |
| Germany | February 3, 2003 | 12-inch single | Warner | |
| United Kingdom | February 3, 2003 | 12-inch single | Warner | |
| United Kingdom | September 22, 2003 | 12-inch single – remixes | Elektra | |

== Booty Luv version ==
"Boogie 2nite"

Single by Booty Luv

from the album Boogie 2nite
- Released: November 20, 2006
- Length: 3:16
- Label: Hed Kandi
- Songwriters: John Smith; Charlene Keys; Nisan Stewart
- Producers: Seamus Haji; Sarita Borge

Booty Luv singles chronology
| "Boogie 2nite" (2006) | "Shine" (2007) |

"Boogie 2nite" was originally remixed by Seamus Haji. A cover version of his remix by English dance music duo Booty Luv was then recorded for their debut studio album, Boogie 2nite (2007). The song was released on November 20, 2006, as the album's lead single via the Hed Kandi label. The single peaked at number two during its third week on the UK Singles Chart. Haji's remix of the track was promoted as the main version of the single, while the DB Boulevard version was used for the music video.

Following the release of Booty Luv's 2009 single "Say It", "Boogie 2nite" re-entered the UK Dance Singles Chart at number 31 in September 2009, three years after its original release.

=== Track listings ===
- UK CD 1
1. "Boogie 2nite" (Seamus Haji Big Love Edit) – 3:16
2. "Boogie 2nite" (DB Boulevard Edit) – 2:35
- UK CD 2
1. "Boogie 2nite" (Seamus Haji Big Love Edit) – 3:16
2. "Boogie 2nite" (DB Boulevard Edit) – 2:35
3. "Boogie 2nite" (Seamus Haji Big Love Remix) – 8:28
4. "Boogie 2nite" (DB Boulevard Club Mix) – 6:10
5. "Boogie 2nite" (Tommy Vee vs Keller Remix) – 7:15
6. "Boogie 2nite" (Danny Freakazoid Remix) – 7:34
7. "Boogie 2nite" (R&B Edit) – 4:23
8. "Boogie 2nite" (video) – 2:34
- UK 12-inch single

A1. "Boogie 2nite" (DB Boulevard Club Mix) – 6:19
A2. "Boogie 2nite" (Tommy Vee vs Keller Remix) – 7:15
B. "Boogie 2nite" (Seamus Haji Big Love Remix) – 8:28

- Dutch CD single
1. "Boogie 2nite" (Seamus Haji Big Love Edit) – 3:16
2. "Boogie 2nite" (DB Boulevard Edit) – 2:35
3. "Boogie 2nite" (Seamus Haji Big Love Club Mix) – 8:28
4. "Boogie 2nite" (DB Boulevard Club Mix) – 6:10
5. "Boogie 2nite" (Tommy Vee vs Keller Remix) – 7:15
6. "Boogie 2nite" (Danny Freakazoid Remix) – 7:34
- Belgian CD single
1. "Boogie 2nite" (Seamus Haji Big Love Edit) – 3:16
2. "Boogie 2nite" (DB Boulevard Edit) – 2:35
3. "Boogie 2nite" (Seamus Haji Big Love Club Mix) – 8:28
4. "Boogie 2nite" (video) – 2:34
- French 12-inch picture disc

A. "Boogie 2nite" (Seamus Haji Big Love Remix) – 8:30
B1. "Boogie 2nite" (Tommy Vee vs Keller Remix) – 7:11
B2. "Boogie 2nite" (DB Boulevard Club Mix) – 6:08

- Australian CD single
1. "Boogie 2nite" (Seamus Haji Big Love Edit) – 3:16
2. "Boogie 2nite" (DB Boulevard Edit) – 2:35
3. "Boogie 2nite" (Seamus Haji Big Love Remix) – 8:28
4. "Boogie 2nite" (DB Boulevard Club Mix) – 6:10
5. "Boogie 2nite" (Tommy Vee vs Keller Remix) – 7:15
- US CD maxi single
1. "Boogie 2nite" (Seamus Haji Big Love Edit) – 3:16
2. "Boogie 2nite" (Seamus Haji Big Love Remix) – 8:28
3. "Boogie 2nite" (DB Boulevard Club Mix) – 6:10
- German CD single
1. "Boogie 2nite" (DB Boulevard Radio Edit) – 2:31
2. "Boogie 2nite" (Seamus Haji Big Love Remix) – 3:13
- German 12-inch single (SOU1726799)

A1. "Boogie 2nite" (DB Boulevard Club Mix) – 6:10
A2. "Boogie 2nite" (Danny Freakazoid Remix) – 7:34
B. "Boogie 2nite" (Seamus Haji Big Love Club Mix) – 8:28

- German 12-inch single (SOU1726800)

A1. "Boogie 2nite" (Teddy-O Rmx)
A2. "Boogie 2nite" (Teddy-O Rmx Instrumental)
A3. "Boogie 2nite" (Accapella)
B1. "Boogie 2nite" (R'n B Edit)
B2. "Boogie 2nite" (DB Boulevard Club Mix)

=== Personnel ===
Personnel are adapted from the liner notes of Boogie 2nite.

- Booty Luv – vocals
- Sarita Borge – additional programming, executive production, vocal production
- Walter Coelho – mastering
- Ben Cook – additional programming, executive production
- Paul Emanuel – drums, keyboards
- Dillon Gallagher – vocal engineering
- Seamus Haji – additional production, drums, keyboards, remix
- Dipesh Parmar – additional programming, executive production

=== Charts ===
==== Weekly charts ====
Weekly chart performance for "Boogie 2nite"
| Chart (2006–2007) | Peak position |
|---|---|
| Australia (ARIA) | 89 |
| Australian Dance (ARIA) | 8 |
| Belgium (Ultratop 50 Flanders) | 38 |
| CIS Airplay (TopHit) | 65 |
| Europe (European Hot 100 Singles) | 11 |
| Finland (Suomen virallinen lista) | 8 |
| Germany (GfK) | 76 |
| Global Dance Tracks (Billboard) | 8 |
| Hungary (Single Top 40) | 5 |
| Hungary (Dance Top 40) | 8 |
| Ireland (IRMA) | 22 |
| Netherlands (Dutch Top 40) | 7 |
| Netherlands (Single Top 100) | 13 |
| Scottish Singles Sales (Official Charts) | 5 |
| UK Singles (Official Charts) | 2 |
| UK Dance (Official Charts) | 2 |

==== Year-end charts ====
2006 year-end chart performance for "Boogie 2nite"
| Chart (2006) | Position |
|---|---|
| Netherlands (Dutch Top 40) | 160 |
| UK Singles (OCC) | 73 |

2007 year-end chart performance for "Boogie 2nite"
| Chart (2007) | Position |
|---|---|
| Europe (European Hot 100 Singles) | 84 |
| Hungary (Dance Top 40) | 71 |
| Netherlands (Dutch Top 40) | 29 |
| Netherlands (Single Top 100) | 79 |
| UK Singles (OCC) | 69 |

=== Certifications ===
Certifications for "Boogie 2nite"
| Region | Certification | Certified units/sales |
|---|---|---|
| United Kingdom (BPI) | Gold | 400,000^{‡} |
^{‡} Sales+streaming figures based on certification alone.
