= Jason Brooks (illustrator) =

English artist and illustrator

Jason Brooks (born February 23, 1969, in London, England) is an artist, illustrator and author. He grew up in Brighton on the south coast of England. Brooks is known for his design of the Hedkandi compilations.

Brooks studied graphic design at Central Saint Martins college, London, and went on to take a master's degree in illustration at the Royal College of Art. While at college he won the Vogue Sotheby's Cecil Beaton Award for Fashion Illustration.

In the 2010s, Brooks authored and illustrated Paris Sketchbook (2012), London Sketchbook (2014), and New York Sketchbook (2017), a series of urban sketch books published by Laurence King, London. London Sketchbook received the V&A Museum Book Illustration Award in 2016.
