= Call Me (Tweet song) =

2002 single by Tweet

Single by Tweet

from the album Southern Hummingbird
- B-side: "Get Away (Move On)"
- Released: April 22, 2002
- Recorded: 2001
- Studio: Manhattan Center (New York City); Westlake Audio (West Hollywood, California)
- Genre: R&B
- Length: 2:57
- Label: The Goldmind; Elektra
- Songwriters: Charlene Keys; Missy Elliott
- Producer: Timbaland

Tweet singles chronology
"Oops (Oh My)" (2002)	"Call Me" (2002)	"No Panties" (2002)

"Call Me" is a song by American singer Tweet from her debut studio album, Southern Hummingbird (2002). It was written by Tweet and Missy Elliott, and produced by Timbaland. The song was released on April 22, 2002, as the album's second single. "Call Me" reached number 31 on the Billboard Hot 100 and number nine on Billboard's Hot R&B/Hip-Hop Songs, becoming Tweet's second consecutive top-10 entry on the latter chart.

The accompanying music video was directed by Chris Robinson and released in May 2002. The song was used in television ads for Verizon Wireless' Freeup prepay wireless service in 2002.

== Track listings ==
- German CD maxi single 1
1. "Call Me" (original version) – 2:56
2. "Call Me" (Soul Society Remix) – 2:57
3. "Call Me" (C.L.A.S.N.O.D.G. Remix) – 3:43
4. "Oops (Oh My)" (live in Munich) – 3:38
5. "Call Me" (video) – 2:58
- UK 12-inch single

A1. "Call Me" (C&J Radio Mix) – 3:05
A2. "Call Me" (LP version) – 2:56
B1. "Call Me" (P. Diddy Remix) – 4:13
B2. "Call Me" (P. Diddy Remix instrumental) – 4:13

- German CD maxi single 2 and UK CD single
1. "Call Me" (C&J Radio Mix) – 3:05
2. "Call Me" (P. Diddy Remix) (featuring the Hoodfellaz) – 4:13
3. "Call Me" (LP version) – 2:56
4. "Call Me" (video) – 2:58
- Australian CD single
1. "Call Me" (album version) – 2:56
2. "Oops (Oh My)" (C&P Radio Edit) – 4:00
3. "Get Away (Move On)" – 4:22
4. "Call Me" (instrumental) – 3:35
- German 12-inch single

A1. "Call Me" (original version) – 2:58
A2. "Call Me" (Soul Society Remix) – 2:57
A3. "Call Me" (C.L.A.S.N.O.D.G. Remix) – 3:43
A4. "Call Me" (C&J Radio Mix) – 3:05
A5. "Call Me" (P. Diddy Remix) – 4:13
B1. "Call Me" (original version instrumental) – 3:35
B2. "Call Me" (Soul Society Remix instrumental) – 2:54
B3. "Call Me" (C.L.A.S.N.O.D.G. Remix instrumental) – 3:43
B4. "Call Me" (C&J Radio Mix instrumental) – 3:09
B5. "Call Me" (P. Diddy Remix instrumental) – 4:09

== Credits and personnel ==
Credits adapted from the liner notes of Southern Hummingbird.

- Tweet – vocals
- Timbaland – production
- Jimmy Douglass – engineering, mixing
- Bernie Grundman – mastering

== Charts ==
=== Weekly charts ===
Weekly chart performance for "Call Me"
Chart (2002)	Peak position
Australia (ARIA)	89
Australian Urban (ARIA)	21
Germany (GfK)	95
Scotland Singles (OCC)	57
UK Singles (OCC)	35
UK Hip Hop/R&B (OCC)	6
US Billboard Hot 100	31
US Hot R&B/Hip-Hop Songs (Billboard)	9
US Rhythmic Airplay (Billboard)	19

=== Year-end charts ===
Year-end chart performance for "Call Me"
Chart (2002)	Position
US Hot R&B/Hip-Hop Songs (Billboard)	45

== Release history ==
Release dates and formats for "Call Me"
Region	Date	Format	Label	Ref.
United States	April 22, 2002	Rhythmic contemporary radio	The Goldmind; Elektra	
Australia	July 8, 2002	CD single	Warner	
Germany	August 12, 2002	CD maxi single	Warner	
United Kingdom	August 26, 2002	CD single; 12-inch single; cassette single	Elektra	
Germany	September 2, 2002	CD maxi single	Warner	
Germany	September 16, 2002	12-inch single	Warner	
