= Oops (Oh My) =

2002 single by Tweet

Single by Tweet featuring Missy Elliott

from the album Southern Hummingbird
- B-side: "My Place" (album version)
- Released: January 11, 2002
- Studio: Westlake Audio (West Hollywood, California)
- Genre: R&B
- Length: 3:58
- Label: The Goldmind; Elektra
- Songwriters: Charlene Keys; Melissa Elliott
- Producer: Timbaland

Tweet singles chronology
| "All Y'all" (2001) | "Oops (Oh My)" (2002) | "Call Me" (2002) |

Missy Elliott singles chronology
| "Son of a Gun (I Betcha Think This Song Is About You)" (2001) | "Oops (Oh My)" (2002) | "The Knoc" (2002) |

Music video
- "Oops (Oh My)" on YouTube

"Oops (Oh My)" is a song by American singer Tweet from her debut studio album, Southern Hummingbird (2002). It features vocals from American rapper Missy Elliott, who co-wrote the song with Tweet, while production was handled by Timbaland. The song was released on January 11, 2002, as the album's lead single.

"Oops (Oh My)" was a commercial success in the United States, peaking at number seven on the Billboard Hot 100 and topping the Billboard Hot R&B/Hip-Hop Singles & Tracks chart. Additionally, it reached number five on the UK Singles Chart. English electropop band Ladytron covered the song on their 2003 compilation album, Softcore Jukebox.

== Writing and composition ==
"Oops (Oh My)" is an R&B song featuring a techno-reggae rhythm, built on a loop derived from sampling "Call Me on the Telephone" by Capleton. Although the song is widely considered to be about masturbation, Tweet explained that "[p]eople can take their definition of what any song means to them, but for me, the song wasn't about masturbation—it was about self-love." She said she was inspired to write the song after watching an episode of The Oprah Winfrey Show where a doctor advised people to look at themselves in the mirror naked in order to build self-acceptance. She added that it was "empowering" for her to write the song as she "felt like [she] didn't love [herself]" due to her skin color.

== Track listings ==
- US 12-inch single

A1. "Oops (Oh My)" (album version) (featuring Missy Elliott)
A2. "Oops (Oh My)" (original version) (featuring Fabolous)
A3. "Oops (Oh My)" (amended version) (featuring Bubba Sparxxx)
B1. "Oops (Oh My)" (instrumental)
B2. "Oops (Oh My)" (TV track)
B3. "Oops (Oh My)" (acappella) (featuring Missy Elliott)

- Australian CD single
1. "Oops (Oh My)" (album version) (featuring Missy Elliott) – 4:01
2. "My Place" (album version) – 4:28
3. "Oops (Oh My)" (amended version) (featuring Fabolous) – 4:00
4. "Oops (Oh My)" (amended version) (featuring Bubba Sparxxx) – 4:35
- UK CD single
1. "Oops (Oh My)" (radio edit) (featuring Missy "Misdemeanor" Elliott) – 3:30
2. "Oops (Oh My)" (amended version) (featuring Bubba Sparxxx) – 4:35
3. "Oops (Oh My)" (amended version) (featuring Fabolous) – 4:00
4. "Oops (Oh My)" (video) (featuring Missy Elliott)
- UK 12-inch single

A1. "Oops (Oh My)" (radio edit) (featuring Missy Elliott) – 3:30
A2. "Oops (Oh My)" (instrumental) – 4:00
B1. "Oops (Oh My)" (amended version) (featuring Bubba Sparxxx) – 4:35
B2. "Oops (Oh My)" (amended version) (featuring Fabolous) – 4:00

- UK cassette single
1. "Oops (Oh My)" (radio edit) (featuring Missy "Misdemeanor" Elliott) – 3:30
2. "Oops (Oh My)" (amended version) (featuring Bubba Sparxxx) – 4:35
3. "Oops (Oh My)" (amended version) (featuring Fabolous) – 4:00
- German CD single
1. "Oops (Oh My)" (radio edit) (featuring Missy Elliott) – 3:30
2. "Oops (Oh My)" (amended version) (featuring Bubba Sparxxx) – 4:35
- German CD maxi single
1. "Oops (Oh My)" (radio edit) (featuring Missy Elliott) – 3:30
2. "Oops (Oh My)" (Dogg Town remix) (featuring Missy Elliott) – 3:18
3. "Oops (Oh My)" (amended version) (featuring Bubba Sparxxx) – 4:35
4. "Oops (Oh My)" (original version) (featuring Fabolous) – 4:35
5. "Oops (Oh My)" (video) (featuring Missy "Misdemeanor" Elliott)
- German 12-inch single

A1. "Oops (Oh My)" (album version) – 4:00
A2. "Oops (Oh My)" (amended version) (featuring Bubba Sparxxx) – 4:35
A3. "Oops (Oh My)" (original version) (featuring Fabolous) – 4:35
B1. "Oops (Oh My)" (Dogg Town remix) (featuring Missy Elliott) – 3:18
B2. "Oops (Oh My)" (Dogg Town remix instrumental) – 3:18
B3. "Oops (Oh My)" (album instrumental) – 4:00
B3. "Oops (Oh My)" (album acappella) (featuring Missy Elliott) – 3:00

== Credits and personnel ==
Credits adapted from the liner notes of Southern Hummingbird.

- Tweet – vocals
- Missy "Misdemeanor" Elliott – vocals
- Timbaland – production
- Jimmy Douglass – engineering, mixing
- Bernie Grundman – mastering

== Charts ==
=== Weekly charts ===
Weekly chart performance for "Oops (Oh My)"
| Chart (2002) | Peak position |
|---|---|
| Australia (ARIA) | 18 |
| Australian Urban (ARIA) | 5 |
| Belgium (Ultratop 50 Flanders) | 48 |
| Belgium (Ultratip Bubbling Under Wallonia) | 10 |
| Canada (Nielsen SoundScan) | 26 |
| Europe (European Hot 100 Singles) | 25 |
| France (SNEP) | 75 |
| Germany (GfK) | 23 |
| Netherlands (Dutch Top 40) | 40 |
| Netherlands (Single Top 100) | 32 |
| New Zealand (Recorded Music NZ) | 38 |
| Scottish Singles Sales (Official Charts) | 17 |
| Sweden (Sverigetopplistan) | 34 |
| Switzerland (Schweizer Hitparade) | 36 |
| UK Singles (Official Charts) | 5 |
| UK Hip Hop/R&B (Official Charts) | 2 |
| US Billboard Hot 100 | 7 |
| US Hot R&B/Hip-Hop Songs (Billboard) | 1 |
| US Pop Airplay (Billboard) | 13 |
| US Rhythmic Airplay (Billboard) | 4 |

=== Year-end charts ===
Year-end chart performance for "Oops (Oh My)"
| Chart (2002) | Position |
|---|---|
| UK Singles (OCC) | 127 |
| UK Urban (Music Week) | 12 |
| US Billboard Hot 100 | 38 |
| US Hot R&B/Hip-Hop Singles & Tracks (Billboard) | 15 |
| US Mainstream Top 40 (Billboard) | 87 |
| US Rhythmic Top 40 (Billboard) | 23 |

== Certifications ==
Certifications for "Oops (Oh My)"
| Region | Certification | Certified units/sales |
|---|---|---|
| New Zealand (RMNZ) | Gold | 15,000^{‡} |
| United Kingdom (BPI) | Silver | 200,000^{‡} |
| United States (RIAA) | Gold | 500,000^{‡} |
^{‡} Sales+streaming figures based on certification alone.

== Release history ==
Release dates and formats for "Oops (Oh My)"
| Region | Date | Format(s) | Label(s) | Ref(s) |
|---|---|---|---|---|
| United States | January 11, 2002 | Rhythmic contemporary radio; urban contemporary radio | The Goldmind; Elektra | |
| United States | February 5, 2002 | 12-inch single | The Goldmind; Elektra | |
| United States | March 3, 2002 | Contemporary hit radio | The Goldmind; Elektra | |
| Australia | April 15, 2002 | CD single | Warner | |
| United Kingdom | April 29, 2002 | CD single; 12-inch single; cassette single | Elektra | |
| Germany | May 6, 2002 | CD single; CD maxi single; 12-inch single | Warner | |

== See also ==
- List of Hot R&B/Hip-Hop Singles & Tracks number ones of 2002
