= Some Kinda Rush =

Single by Booty Luv

from the album Boogie 2nite
- Released: 17 December 2007
- Genre: Electropop
- Length: 3:31
- Label: Hed Kandi
- Songwriters: Nadia Shepherd, Cherise Roberts, Carl Ryden, Samantha Powell
- Producer: Carl Ryden

Booty Luv singles chronology
"Don't Mess With My Man" (2007)	"Some Kinda Rush" (2007)	"Dance, Dance" (2008)

Music video
- "Some Kinda Rush" on YouTube

"Some Kinda Rush" is the fourth single by the English electronic vocal duo Booty Luv. It was released in the UK on 24 December 2007 as the fourth single from their debut album Boogie 2nite. It is the first original single release from the duo, with their previous singles being covers, and was written and produced by Swedish producer Carl Rydén with songwriting credits from both group members, Nadia and Cherise, as well as Samantha Powell (aka Sammy Jay).

== Chart performance ==
On 25 November 2007, the single entered the UK Top 100 at number 93 on downloads from the album alone. It rose to number 54 after the official download was released. The single was officially released on 17 December. A week later, the single moved up 8 places to number 21, then peaked at number 19 the following week, where it stayed for two weeks, outlasting the number of weeks previous single, "Don't Mess With My Man", lasted inside the UK top 75. The promotion from the single managed to get the album back into the official Top 100 album chart, at number 87.

The single debuted at number 19 in the Netherlands (Dutch Top 40), where it peaked at number 10, becoming their biggest hit since "Boogie 2nite".

== Music video ==
The video was released on 16 November to all music channels. The music video features Nadia Shepherd and Cherise Roberts driving around in a yellow Lamborghini Gallardo for most of the video. At the start, the camera is zoomed in on a key ring attached to the back pocket of Nadia's jeans; the key ring says "Booty Luv". Nadia and Cherise get into a car and begin driving, they drive on when the background changes to a scene where there are snow-capped mountains in the background. The outfits Booty Luv are wearing change with the setting and they are then wearing thick coats with gloves and hats. Towards the end of the video they go into a desert and their outfits change into blouses and T-shirts, the same clothes they were wearing at the start of the video. They drive into Las Vegas, the camera also cuts to shots that point down Nadia and Cherise's tops. At the end, Booty Luv get out of the car and walk off, leaving the car behind. The background changes back to a simple indoor studio wallpaper.

== Track listing ==
HK46CDX:

1. Some Kinda Rush (radio edit)
2. Some Kinda Rush (acoustic version)

HK46CDS:

1. Some Kinda Rush (radio edit)
2. Some Kinda Rush (club mix)
3. Some Kinda Rush (Spencer & Hill remix)
4. Some Kinda Rush (Soul Avengerz remix)
5. Some Kinda Rush (Paleface remix)
6. Some Kinda Rush (acoustic version)
7. Some Kinda Rush (video)

HK46CDSP:

1. Some Kinda Rush (radio edit)
2. Some Kinda Rush (club mix)
3. Some Kinda Rush (dub mix)
4. Some Kinda Rush (Soul Avengerz remix)
5. Some Kinda Rush (Spencer & Hill remix)
6. Some Kinda Rush (Filthy Rich remix)
7. Some Kinda Rush (instrumental)

HK46T:

1. Some Kinda Rush (club mix)
2. Some Kinda Rush (Soul Avengerz remix)
3. Some Kinda Rush (Spencer & Hill remix)
4. Some Kinda Rush (Filthy Rich remix)

== Charts ==
Chart (2007–2008)	Peak position
Ireland (IRMA)	47
Netherlands (Dutch Top 40)	10
Netherlands (Single Top 100)	26
Romania (Romanian Top 100)	70
Scotland Singles (OCC)	13
UK Singles (OCC)	19
UK Dance (OCC)	3

=== Year-end charts ===
Chart (2008)	Position
UK Singles (OCC)	158
