= Danetra Moore =

- Birth name: Danetra Shari Moore
- Born: September 15, 1986 (age 38); Stockton, California
- Origin: Atlanta, Georgia
- Genres: urban contemporary gospel
- Occupation(s): Singer, songwriter
- Instrument(s): vocals, singer-songwriter
- Years active: 2012–present
- Labels: Tyscot
- Website: danetramoore.com

Danetra Shari Moore (born on September 15, 1986) is an American urban contemporary gospel artist and musician. She started her music career, in 2012, by performing on Sunday Best on BET. Her first studio album, Light in the Dark, was released on September 11, 2015, by Tyscot Records. This album was her breakthrough release upon the Billboard magazine charts.

== Early life ==
Moore was born, Danetra Shari Moore, on September 15, 1986, in Stockton, California, while she resides in Atlanta, Georgia. She was a singer ever since the age of two and started recording her music at ten years old.

== Music career ==
Her music career started in 2012, with the appearance on BET's reality television signing competition, Sunday Best, where she finished in third place. She released, Light in the Dark, her first studio album, on September 11, 2015, with Tyscot Records. This album was her breakthrough release upon the Billboard magazine charts, where it placed on the Top Gospel Albums chart, peaking at No. 22.

== Discography ==
=== Studio albums ===
List of studio albums, with selected chart positions
Title	Album details	Peak chart positions
Title	Album details	US Gos
Light in the Dark	Released: September 11, 2015; Label: Tyscot; CD, digital download	22
