= Shine (Luther Vandross song) =

2006 song by Luther Vandross

Single by Luther Vandross

from the album The Ultimate Luther Vandross
- Released: 2006
- Length: 3:24 (radio edit)
- Label: Epic
- Songwriters: James Harris III, Terry Lewis, Bernard Edwards, Nile Rodgers
- Producers: Jimmy Jam and Terry Lewis

Luther Vandross singles chronology
"The Closer I Get to You" (2004)	"Shine" (2006)	"Got You Home" (2006)

"Shine" is a song by American singer-songwriter Luther Vandross, the first single from his greatest hits package The Ultimate Luther Vandross. The track samples Chic's song "My Forbidden Lover". "Shine" became a top-20 urban radio hit, and the club mixes of the song became popular on dance radio stations and clubs in the United States. The single was a top-50 hit in the United Kingdom but failed to chart on the US Billboard Hot 100 despite reaching number 31 on the Billboard Hot R&B/Hip Hop Songs chart. In 2007, British dance music duo Booty Luv released a cover version that reached the top 20 in several European countries.

== Track listings ==
UK CD single

1. "Shine" (Radio edit) - 3:51
2. "Shine" (Freemasons radio edit) - 3:40

US 12-inch single

1. "Shine" (Album version) - 4:50
2. "Shine" (Freemasons Club Mix) - 7:38
3. "Shine" (Freemasons Dub Mix) - 6:32
4. "Shine" (Acapella version) - 4:34
- Contains a sample from "My Forbidden Lover" written by Bernard Edwards and Nile Rodgers as performed by Chic.

== Charts ==
=== Weekly charts ===
Chart (2006)	Peak position
UK Singles (OCC)	50
US Bubbling Under Hot 100 (Billboard)	16
US Adult R&B Songs (Billboard)	4
US Hot R&B/Hip-Hop Songs (Billboard)	31

=== Year-end charts ===
Chart (2006)	Position
US Hot R&B/Hip-Hop Songs (Billboard)	89

== Booty Luv version ==
"Shine"

Single by Booty Luv

from the album Boogie 2nite
- Released: May 7, 2007
- Length: 3:24
- Label: Hed Kandi
- Songwriters: James Harris III, Terry Lewis, Bernard Edwards, Nile Rodgers
- Producers: T&F & Moltosugo

Booty Luv singles chronology
"Boogie 2nite" (2006)	"Shine" (2007)	"Don't Mess with My Man" (2007)

iTunes cover

Due to the club mix of the Luther Vandross version of "Shine" becoming popular, the song was covered by UK dance duo Booty Luv, who released it as their second single less than one year from the original release of the track. "Shine" was released in the United Kingdom via the Hed Kandi label on May 7, 2007. Booty Luv's version was well received and added to the BBC Radio 1's A-playlist. It peaked at number 10 on the UK Singles Chart, number six in Finland, and number 13 in the Netherlands.

The DJ Teddy-O remix of "Boogie 2nite" featured on the Maxi CD is also featured on Big Brovaz's Re-Entry album. However, the track is not listed as being a remix on the back cover. The song's music video is mainly of the two girls dancing in front of bright lights, with backing dancers.

=== Track listings ===
UK CD1

1. "Shine" (radio edit)
2. "Boogie 2nite" (DJ Teddy-O remix)
3. "Shine" (extended T&F and Moltosugo mix)
4. "Shine" (Moto Blanco remix)
5. "Shine" (Ian Carey remix)

UK CD2

1. "Shine" (radio edit)
2. "Shine" (extended T&F and Moltosugo mix)

UK 12-inch single

A1. "Shine" (extended T&F and Moltosugo mix)
A2. "Shine" (Moto Blanco remix)
B1. "Shine" (Ian Carey remix)
B2. "Shine" (Hoxton Whores remix)

=== Charts ===
==== Weekly charts ====
Chart (2007)	Peak position
Belgium (Ultratip Bubbling Under Flanders)	4
Finland (Suomen virallinen lista)	6
Hungary (Editors' Choice Top 40)	33
Netherlands (Dutch Top 40)	13
Netherlands (Single Top 100)	19
Scotland Singles (OCC)	11
UK Singles (OCC)	10
UK Dance (OCC)	2

==== Year-end charts ====
Chart (2007)	Position
UK Singles (OCC)	117
