= Don't Mess with My Man (Lucy Pearl song) =

2000 single by Lucy Pearl

Single by Lucy Pearl

from the album Lucy Pearl
- Released: August 15, 2000
- Length: 3:43
- Label: Pookie; Beyond Music
- Songwriters: Raphael Saadiq; Dawn Robinson; Conesha Owens
- Producers: Raphael Saadiq; Ali Shaheed Muhammad

Lucy Pearl singles chronology
"Dance Tonight" (2000)	"Don't Mess with My Man" (2000)	"Without You" (2001)

"Don't Mess with My Man" is the second single from American R&B group Lucy Pearl and the second single taken from their debut self-titled album. The song was released to urban radio on August 15, 2000.

The song was the group's biggest success in the United Kingdom, peaking at number 20 on the UK Singles Chart. It also found some success in Iceland, where it peaked at number two, and in France, where it peaked at number 14. In the United States, the song was not as successful as debut single "Dance Tonight", peaking outside of the Billboard Hot 100.

"Don't Mess with My Man" was also the group's last single with band member Dawn Robinson. In 2014, the song was sampled by Ed Sheeran for his single "Don't".

== Track listing ==
UK CD single

1. "Don't Mess with My Man" (album version) [3:43]
2. "Don't Mess with My Man" (Mood II Swing edit) [3:40]
3. "Don't Mess with My Man" (Wookie radio mix) [6:18]
4. "Don't Mess with My Man" (video)

== Charts ==
=== Weekly charts ===
Chart (2000)	Peak position
Australian Urban (ARIA)	19
Belgium (Ultratop 50 Flanders)	37
Belgium (Ultratop 50 Wallonia)	23
Denmark (Tracklisten)	11
France (SNEP)	14
Iceland (Íslenski Listinn Topp 40)	2
Ireland (IRMA)	26
Netherlands (Dutch Top 40)	35
Netherlands (Single Top 100)	63
Scottish Singles Sales (Official Charts)	37
Sweden (Sverigetopplistan)	22
Switzerland (Schweizer Hitparade)	29
UK Singles (Official Charts)	20
UK Hip Hop/R&B (Official Charts)	3
US Dance Singles Sales (Billboard)	14
US Hot R&B/Hip-Hop Songs (Billboard)	41

=== Year-end charts ===
Chart (2000)	Position
UK Urban (Music Week)	21

== Certifications ==
Certifications for "Don't Mess with My Man"
Region	Certification	Certified units/sales
New Zealand (RMNZ)	Gold	15,000^{‡}
United Kingdom (BPI)	Silver	200,000^{‡}
^{‡} Sales+streaming figures based on certification alone.

== Release history ==
Region	Date	Format(s)	Label(s)	Ref.
United States	August 15, 2000	Urban radio	Pookie; Beyond Music	
United Kingdom	November 13, 2000	12-inch vinyl; CD; cassette	Virgin	
Australia	January 29, 2001	CD	Virgin	

== Booty Luv version ==
"Don't Mess with My Man"

Single by Booty Luv

from the album Boogie 2nite
- Released: September 3, 2007
- Length: 2:53
- Label: Hed Kandi
- Songwriters: Raphael Saadiq; Dawn Robinson; Ali Shaheed Muhammad
- Producers: Sarita Borge; Lee Dagger; Marc JB

Booty Luv singles chronology
"Shine" (2007)	"Don't Mess with My Man" (2007)	"Some Kinda Rush" (2007)

"Don't Mess with My Man" was released as the third single from the debut album of UK dance music duo Booty Luv. It was released on September 3, 2007, two weeks before their debut album was released, and reach number 11 on the UK Singles Chart.

=== Track listings ===
UK CD1

1. "Don't Mess with My Man" (radio edit)
2. "Don't Mess with My Man" (Seamus Haji Big Love remix)

UK CD2

1. "Don't Mess with My Man" (radio edit)
2. "Don't Mess with My Man" (extended)
3. "Don't Mess with My Man" (Seamus Haji Big Love remix)
4. "Don't Mess with My Man" (Thomas Gold remix)
5. "Don't Mess with My Man" (Ryden's live edit)

UK promo CD

1. "Don't Mess with My Man" (radio edit)
2. "Don't Mess with My Man" (extended)
3. "Don't Mess with My Man" (Seamus Haji Big Love remix)
4. "Don't Mess with My Man" (Thomas Gold disco remix)
5. "Don't Mess with My Man" (Thomas Gold disco rub)
6. "Don't Mess with My Man" (Soul Survivors remix)
7. "Don't Mess with My Man" (instrumental)

=== Charts ===
Chart (2007)	Peak position
Finland (Suomen virallinen lista)	9
Ireland (IRMA)	26
Netherlands (Dutch Top 40)	28
Netherlands (Single Top 100)	31
Scottish Singles Sales (Official Charts)	13
UK Singles (Official Charts)	11
UK Dance (Official Charts)	7
