= Booty Luv =

British dance group

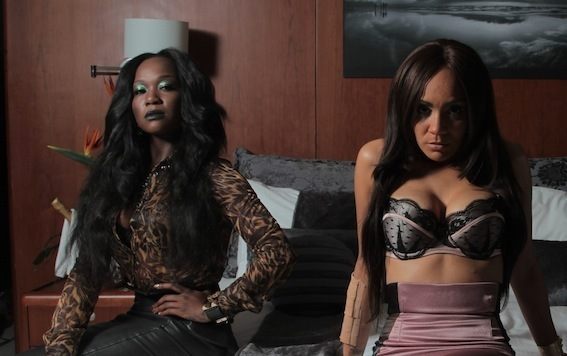
- Cherise and Nadia on the set of the "Black Widow" music video (2012)

Background information
- Also known as: Cherise & Nadia (2011–2012)
- Origin: London, England
- Genres: Dance
- Years active: 2006–Present
- Labels: Hedkandi; Ministry of Sound; Pierce Entertainment
- Members: Cherise Roberts; Nadia Shepherd

Booty Luv are an English dance music group formed in June 2006 in London by their record label, Hedkandi. The group comprises two R&B vocalists, Cherise Roberts and Nadia Shepherd, both of whom were in the original line-up of the hip hop and R&B group Big Brovaz. To date, they have released one BPI Silver-certified studio solo album as a twosome, and have had five top twenty hits in the UK. They have also achieved international success, gaining hits in Ireland, Poland, the Netherlands and Germany.

The duo decided to take a hiatus in 2009 to concentrate on solo projects after the release of their single "Say It", which was meant to be taken as the lead single from their second studio album. In late 2011, following a two-year break the duo announced they had changed their name to "Cherise & Nadia" and went on a mini-tour in Australia to promote material from their debut album. In November 2012, the duo changed their name back to Booty Luv and released their comeback single "Black Widow" on 3 February 2013. Although their second album remains unreleased and have not released any new material since 2013 the duo are still actively performing as of 2026.

== History ==
=== 2002–2005: Big Brovaz and formation ===
Roberts and Shepherd both began their career as members of the R&B and hip hop group Big Brovaz, which achieved seven UK top 40 singles between 2002 and 2004. Roberts was already an established singer before joining Big Brovaz, recording a solo album Look Inside and single "2nd Best". The album won her a MOBO Unsung Award in 2000.

Booty Luv was created during early recordings of the second Big Brovaz album, Re-Entry, when Roberts and Shepherd were approached to record and promote a new version of R&B/soul singer Tweet's club hit "Boogie 2nite". Following the poor sales of early singles from Re-Entry in mid-2006, the duo accepted the offer and began recording their new version of the song, initially only as a promotional track for the record label Hedkandi. Six months later in December, however, Booty Luv's version of "Boogie 2nite" was decided to be released as an actual single in the UK and mainland Europe following positive reviews from club DJs on the dance scene.

=== 2006–2009: Boogie 2nite and hiatus ===
In late 2006, the video for "Boogie 2nite" was sent to music channels and the song was heavily promoted. The original dance remix by Seamus Haji was chosen for the song's download and physical releases, while the video was chosen to feature the remix by the group DB Boulevard. The song became their first number-one single in the UK Dance Chart. Spending 23 weeks inside the UK Top 75, "Boogie 2nite" resulted in Booty Luv extending their contract with Hedkandi to four follow-up singles and an album.

In May 2007, after taking several months to record their debut album, Booty Luv released the follow-up single "Shine", a cover of the Luther Vandross song. It was well received by radio and became the group's second top ten single, spending an eventual seven weeks inside the UK Top 40. It also hit the top spot on the UK Dance Chart.

Their debut album, Boogie 2nite, was released in September 2007, one week after third single "Don't Mess with My Man" (a cover of a Lucy Pearl song) peaked at number 11 on the UK Singles Chart and became their third number-one dance hit. The album featured five original tracks co-written by Booty Luv, including the fourth single, "Some Kinda Rush" (a number 19 hit in December 2007). Boogie 2nite entered the UK Albums Chart at number 11 and was certified Silver by the BPI in late 2008, denoting 60,000 copies sold. In late 2007, the UK iTunes Store offered the track "Something to Talk About" as its 'Free Single of the Week'. A fifth single from the album, "Dance, Dance", was given a limited release across Europe in 2008, and reached the top five on the Netherlands dance chart (peaking at number 27 on the main chart).

Roberts and Shepherd confirmed in an interview with Digital Spy in 2007 that they planned to begin work on their second album in 2008. They also mentioned that they were talking about future plans with Hedkandi and wanted the album to contain only original songs. In another Digital Spy interview in July 2009, Shepherd revealed that the band had been working with multiple producers and that the album had "an edgier style". She also commented that "some tracks have a real R&B vibe to them, others are proper dance tracks and some are typical poppier tracks. It's a really exciting mixture of sounds." Roberts stated that they had been working with Fraser T Smith.

The duo released their first single in over two years "Say It", which premiered on 10 April 2009. The first performance of the single was at Sony Ericsson's Dance Nation Festival where the duo performed a set. The musicality of the song differed slightly from the previous material released by the band, having more of an electro feel to it. The single was released on 31 August 2009, and was premiered on the official Hedkandi website and the video sharing site YouTube. The single was Popjustice's 'Single of the Day' on 10 April 2009. The single continued the band's run of UK Top 20 hits, debuting at number 16 on 6 September 2009, the week's fourth highest new entry.

=== 2011–2023: "Black Widow" and Touring ===
Booty Luv returned from their two-year hiatus when they performed in 2011 at Nottingham Pride and Cardiff's Pulse Street Party. They were signed to Pierce Entertainment record label and released a promo single entitled "This Night", which was officially released for a limited time to coincide with their Australian Tour in May 2012 via iTunes. The duo released their official music video for "Black Widow" on 12 November 2012, they released the single on 3 February 2013, which made the top 5 in the official Dance & Urban Club Charts. During the following summer, the duo headlined the Oxford Pride festival on 8 June 2013. The duo also headlined Pride in Gloucester on 9 September 2023.

Although the second Booty Luv album was slated for a late 2013 release, the album was ultimately never released, and Roberts and Shepherd later reformed with Big Brovaz for a number of live shows. They have also simultaneously continued to perform as Booty Luv.

== Discography ==
Studio albums

- Boogie 2nite (2007)
