= Craig Brockman =

American songwriter

- Genres: Rap & Hip Hop, R&B, Soul
- Occupation: Producer
- Instrument: synthesizer keyboards Hammond Organ
- Years active: 1997 - Present

Craig Xavier Brockman is a hip hop and R&B record producer, arranger, keyboardist, and instrumentalist. He mostly works with Missy Elliott, Timbaland, Terrace Martin, Warren G. He is also a member of The Soul Seekers.

== Production ==
- Madonna - "American Life (Missy Elliott American Dream Remix)" (produced with Missy Elliott)
- Blaque - "Ugly" (produced with Missy Elliott & CKB)
- Missy Elliott - "...So Addictive (Intro)" (produced with Missy Elliott)
- Missy Elliott - "Take Away" (produced by Timbaland, co-produced by Craig Brockman and Missy "Misdemeanor" Elliott)
- Tweet - "So Much To Say (Intro)"
- Tweet - "My Place"
- Tweet - "Smoking Cigarettes" (produced with Tweet)
- Tweet - "Best Friend" (produced with Tweet)
- Tweet - "Beautiful"
- Tweet - "Complain" (produced with Tweet)
- Tweet - "Heaven" (produced with Tweet & Timbaland)
- Tweet - "Drunk" (produced with Tweet)
- Missy Elliott - "Nothing Out There For Me (feat. Beyoncé)" (produced with Missy Elliott)
- Missy Elliott - "Can You Hear Me (feat. TLC)" (produced with Missy Elliott)
- Monica - "Get It Off (feat. Dirtbag)" (produced with Missy Elliott)
- Missy Elliott - "Irresistible Delicious (feat. (Slick Rick)"
- Missy Elliott - "Remember When" (produced with Missy Elliott)
- Missy Elliott - "Bad Man (feat. M.I.A. & Vybz Kartel)"
- K-Ci & JoJo - "HBI" (produced with Jo Jo Hailey & Mike Smoov)
- Tweet - "Intro (It's Me Again)"
- Tweet - "Iceberg" (produced with Tweet, Charlie Bereal)
- Tweet - "Cab Ride"
- Tweet - "Things I Don't Mean" (produced with Missy Elliott, Charlie Bereal)
- Tweet - "My Man" (produced with Missy Elliott)
- Tweet - "Small Change"
- Tweet - "Two Of Us"(produced with Charlie Bereal)
- Tweet - "I'm Done"
- Tweet - "We Don't Need No Water" (produced with Missy Elliott, Kwamé), Spencer Proffer & Steve Plunkett)
- Beyoncé - "Signs" (produced with Missy Elliott)
- Missy Elliott - "Ragtime (Interlude)" (produced with Missy Elliott)
- Missy Elliott - "Dats What I'm Talkin About (feat. R. Kelly)" (produced with Missy Elliott)
- Missy Elliott - "Toyz" (produced with Missy Elliott & Timbaland)
- Missy Elliott - "It's Real" (produced with Missy Elliott)
- Missy Elliott - "I'm Not Perfect" (produced with Missy Elliott)
- Fantasia Barrino - "Free Yourself" (produced with Missy Elliott)
- Fantasia Barrino - "Good Lovin'" (produced with Missy Elliott)
- Timbaland & Magoo - "Voice Mail" (produced with Timbaland)
- Timbaland & Magoo - "Love Me (feat. Tweet)" (produced with Timbaland)
- Timbaland & Magoo - "Drop" (produced with Timbaland)
- Angie Stone - "U-Haul" (produced with Missy Elliott, Jubu)
