= Nisan Stewart =

- Origin: Lynwood, California, U.S.
- Genres: Contemporary R&B, gospel
- Occupations: Minister; record producer; songwriter; drummer
- Member of: The Soul Seekers

Nisan Cumming Stewart is an American minister, record producer and drummer serving since 2014 as Lead Pastor of the Lynwood, California-based Greater Emmanuel Temple Church. Having worked with Timbaland and Missy Elliott on the latter's earlier work (This Is Not a Test!), he co-produced Karen Clark Sheard's 2002 album 2nd Chance, and co-produced and co-wrote Nelly Furtado's 2006 single "No Hay Igual".

He has served as musical director for Jamie Foxx, and 50 Cent. He founded the gospel music group Soul Seekers in 2000, which includes fellow producers Warryn Campbell and Craig Brockman.

== Production discography ==
Year	Title	Artist
2008	Listen	Terry Dexter
2003	Dangerously in Love	Beyoncé
2006	Surrounded	Men of Standard
2006	Loose	Nelly Furtado
2006	The Gospel According To Patti LaBelle	Patti LaBelle
2005	Mary Mary	Mary Mary
2005	It's Me Again	Tweet
2004	Stone Love	Angie Stone
2003	One Love	New Edition
2003	This Is Not A Test!	Missy Elliott
2002	Southern Hummingbird	Tweet
2002	2nd Chance	Karen Clark Sheard
2001	Miss E... So Addictive	Missy Elliott
