= Seamus Haji =

British record producer

- Born: 30 December 1968 (age 57)
- Genres: Dance, house, jump-up, drum and bass
- Occupations: DJ, producer, remixer
- Labels: Big Love, Ultra, Toolroom, Strictly Rhythm, Defected, Sirup
- Website: seamushaji.com

Seamus Haji (born 30 December 1968) is a British, Brighton based DJ and record producer.

== Biography ==
=== Personal life ===
He is of Irish and Indian descent.

=== Music career ===
Haji had a number one on the UK Dance Chart, with a cover of Indeep's "Last Night a DJ Saved My Life". He originally released this as a single in 2004. The single originally reached #69 on the UK Singles Chart, and #13 on re-issue in March 2007 and #1 on the UK Dance Chart.

He has remixed many tracks by other artists, some of which have been promoted as the main version of the track in question; "Boogie 2nite" by Booty Luv, which reached number 2 on the UK chart, is one such track. Haji has worked with many artists including Mariah Carey, Rihanna, Moby, Mika, Jamiroquai and Estelle.

He often produces in partnership with Paul Emanuel (formerly of Club Asylum), and together they had a UK chart hit in 2005, with their cover of True Faith, Bridgette Grace and Final Cut's "Take Me Away".

In 2010, he released the track "Good Times", in collaboration with Mark Knight and Funkagenda. In 2018, he made two tracks with Sammy Deuce, "Disco Crown" and "Celebrate Disco". In 2018, he released another single, "Give Your Love".

In 2026, he often DJs on his radio show, the Big Love Radio Show. Since 2025, he has also had a show called Haji's House.
