= Tweet (singer) =

American singer (born 1971)

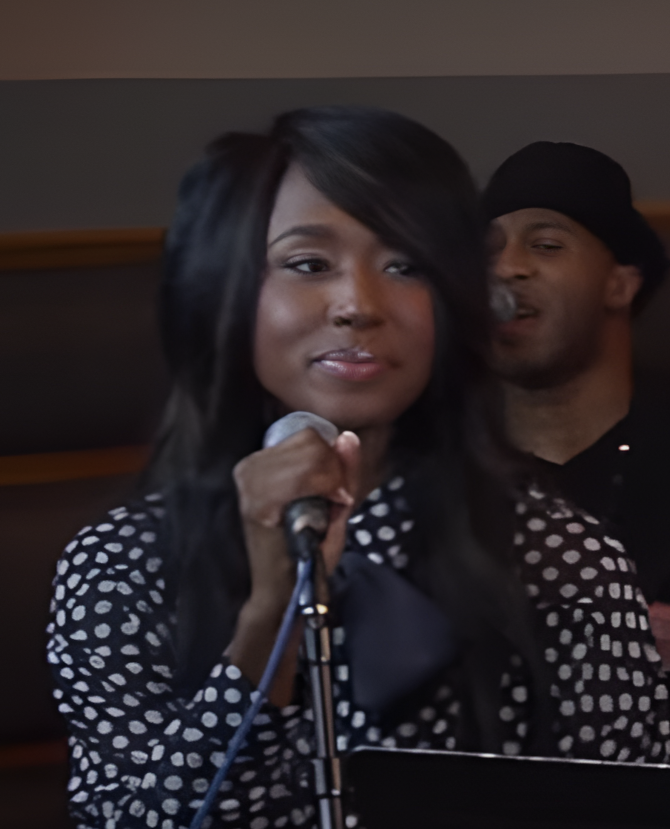
- Tweet in 2011

Background information
- Born: Charlene Keys; January 21, 1971 (age 55); Rochester, New York, U.S.
- Genres: R&B; soul; neo soul
- Occupations: Singer; songwriter
- Instruments: Vocals; guitar
- Years active: 1992–present
- Labels: The Goldmind; Elektra; Atlantic; Umbrella; DuBose Music Group; eOne; SoNo Recording Broup

Charlene Keys (born January 21, 1971), better known by her stage name Tweet, is an American singer and songwriter.

== Career ==
=== Early career ===
In the early 1990s, Tweet joined the female trio Sugah, leaving her daughter with her parents in Panama City, Florida. Sugah was composed of Tweet, Susan Weems, and Rolita White; the group was a part of Devante Swing's Swing Mob collective. While there, she met Missy "Misdemeanor" Elliott, with whom she formed a close friendship. Around 1999, Tweet returned to her parents' home in Panama City.

In 2001, Tweet was featured on Missy Elliott's platinum-selling third album, Miss E... So Addictive, with her featuring on one track and providing background vocals to another four. She also contributed background vocals to Ja Rule's Pain Is Love, Bubba Sparxxx's Dark Days, Bright Nights, Timbaland and Magoo's Indecent Proposal, and Petey Pablo's Diary of a Sinner: 1st Entry.

=== 2002–04: Southern Hummingbird ===
In March 2002, Tweet released her debut solo single, "Oops (Oh My)". The song was produced by Timbaland and features guest vocals by Missy Elliott. The single hit number one on the Hot R&B/Hip-Hop Songs and number seven on the Billboard Hot 100.

In April 2002, Tweet released her debut album Southern Hummingbird. The album featured production by Craig Brockman, Nisan Stewart, guitarist John "Jubu" Smith, Timbaland, and Tweet herself. The album includes features from Elliott, Bilal, and Ms. Jade. The album debuted at number three on the Billboard 200 chart. The album spawned two follow-up singles: the Timbaland-produced "Call Me" and "Smoking Cigarettes".

In 2002, Tweet appeared as a guest vocalist on Trina's second single "No Panties" her album Diamond Princess. Tweet also appeared as a background vocalist on Meshell Ndegeocello's Cookie: The Anthropological Mixtape, Karen Clark Sheard's 2nd Chance, Ms. Jade's Girl Interrupted, Whitney Houston's Just Whitney... and Elliott's Under Construction. For the latter, Tweet appeared on four of the tracks and made cameo performances in two videos released from the album, "Work It" and "Gossip Folks". Among others, Tweet appeared in the music video for Aaliyah's posthumous hit single, "Miss You".

Tweet was nominated for a Soul Train Lady of Soul Award for Best New Artist but lost to Ashanti. That year Tweet was awarded the Key to the City for Rochester, New York.

In 2003, Tweet appeared as a background vocalist on the following releases: Madonna's American Life The Remixes Single, Monica's After the Storm, Mark Ronson's Here Comes the Fuzz, and Angie Stone's Stone Love on the 2004 song "U-Haul".

In 2003, Tweet had a cameo appearance in the film Honey and contributed the song "Thugman" for its soundtrack.

=== 2005–07: It's Me Again ===
During 2003 and 2004, Tweet began recording songs for her follow-up to Southern Hummingbird. The album was supposed to be released in early 2004, but was pushed back when Tweet moved from Elektra Entertainment Group to Atlantic Records in 2004. In late 2004, Tweet released the single "Turn da Lights Off. The song was produced by Missy Elliott and Kwamé, featured vocals from Elliott and contained a sample of Marvin Gaye's "If This World Were Mine" and Nat King Cole's "Lost April". To promote the single, Tweet joined Cee-Lo Green and Teedra Moses on the 2004 Seagram's Gin Live Tour. The same year, Tweet appeared in Elliott's music video "I'm Really Hot". Tweet also appeared on the posthumous unreleased Elliott-produced Aaliyah track "Where Could He Be".

On March 22, 2005, Tweet released her second album It's Me Again. The album featured production from Missy Elliott on several of the tracks. The album featured vocals from Tweet's 15-year-old daughter, Tashawna, on "Two of Us", Rell and Missy Elliott were also featured. "When I Need a Man" (theme song from the USA network original series, Kojak) was included as a hidden track. The album peaked at No. 17 on the Billboard albums chart. Tweet then broke away from her manager, Mona Scott, and Violator Management, and signed with Mathew Knowles of Music World.

Tweet appeared on Elliott's sixth album release, The Cookbook, contributing vocals to three tracks, including the single "Teary Eyed".

=== 2007–16: Simply Tweet and Charlene ===
In 2007, Tweet performed with Timbaland, Eve, Keyshia Cole, Nelly Furtado, Fat Man Scoop and Ciara at the 4th annual VH1 Hip Hop Honors, honoring the work of Missy Elliott which aired on October 8. The same year, she departed from Missy Elliott's Goldmind Inc. camp and signed to Jheryl Busby and Mike City's record label, Umbrella Recordings. There, she began recording material for her third album along with producers Nisan Stewart, Warryn Campbell and Novel. Initially titled Love, Tweet, the album was preceded by the buzz single "Good Bye My Dear", a collaboration with rapper T.I., and expected to be released on April 8, 2008. The release of lead single "Anymore" failed to materialize however. On April 26 and 27, 2008, Tweet along with Bilal, Dwele and German singer Joy Denalane performed with The Dresden Soul Symphony in Dresden, Germany. The quartet reinterpreted soul hits and combined them with classical music. An album The Dresden Soul Symphony and DVD were later released on October 24, 2008.

In 2010, Tweet split from Umbrella due to a lack of promotion and ongoing delays. In late 2011, Tweet signed to MC Lyte's record label DuBose Music Group. In June 2012, she began posting previously unreleased material from the It's Me Again and Love, Tweet recording sessions on her new website as a part of her weekly SoundCloud-hosted special, Tweet Tuesdays. In February 2013, DuBose released her Simply Tweet EP. Recorded live with a full band, the five-track set was preceded by the single "Enough". The digital extended play reached the top thirty on both the US Billboard Independent Albums and the Top R&B/Hip-Hop Albums chart.

In July 2015, Tweet confirmed that she had signed with the independent eOne Music label. Her third regular studio album Charlene, featuring production from Missy Elliott, is expected to be released on January 22, 2016, in the United States, with its lead single to be released on September 21, 2015. On February 29, 2016, the 'Hummingbird' singer sat down with Lindsey Sullivan (of Billboard) to discuss her new album "Charlene". During the interview Tweet mentioned her excitement teaming up with Timbaland and Missy Elliott. She also stated the album was a growing experience.

=== 2025-present: Memoirs of the Southern Hummingbird ===
In July 2025, Tweet signed a new record deal with SRG-ILS Group, announcing she will release her fourth studio album, Memoirs of The Southern Hummingbird in fall 2025. Ahead of the album's release the singer will drop a reimagined version of her 2010 track "Love Again" on September 11, 2025 (though this didn't happen); on September 26, 2025, Tweet released the official lead single, "Toot-Toot."

== Awards and nominations ==
=== Soul Train Music Awards ===
Year	Nominee / work	Award	Result	Ref.
2003	Tweet	Best New Artist	Nominated	

== Discography ==
Studio albums

- Southern Hummingbird (2002)
- It's Me Again (2005)
- Charlene (2016)
- Memoirs of the Southern Hummingbird (TBA)

== Filmography ==
=== Film ===
- 2003: Honey as Tweety

=== Television ===
- 2002: The Parkers as Herself

== Endorsements ==
- Verizon Wireless TV & print ads (featured in the "Call Me" music video)
- Citizen Watches print ads
- 2002 Gap Stretch Jeans TV ads directed by Peter Lindbergh, performing "I'll Take You There" together with Taryn Manning
- Pantene Pro-Voice TV & print ads (with Mýa, Vanessa Carlton and Lucy Woodward)
