= Hedkandi =

English record label and music brand

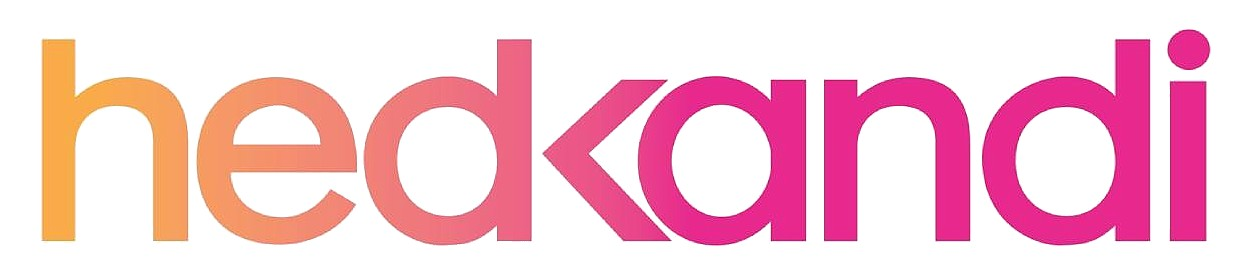
- Industry: Music
- Founded: 1999
- Headquarters: London, England
- Products: House and disco music compilations, dance music events
- Parent: Ministry of Sound
- Website: www.hedkandi.com

Hedkandi is an English record label and dance music events brand that is owned by Ministry of Sound. Its back catalogue includes both artist albums and compilations.

== History ==
The Hedkandi label was founded in 1999 at radio station Jazz FM's Enterprise Division by Mark Doyle, who proposed the initial idea and created the name, concept and track listings, as a stable mate to Jazz FM Records. Its live events quickly gained popularity with a residency in Ibiza at el Divino and by having its own specialist radio show on Jazz FM. In 2002, Hedkandi had gathered enough momentum from its Ibiza nights to launch a regular residency at Pacha in London.

The Hedkandi brand was supported by Team Kandi, which involved a core of disc jockeys and brand ambassadors, and back office staff that delivered the international package of albums and events. Standing out from other club events, Hedkandi thrived on glitzy and glamorous production as well an emphasis on partnering the Hedkandi musical sound with high production values and locations.

In January 2006, Hedkandi was purchased by Ministry of Sound.

== Events ==
Since its inception in 1999, Hedkandi has developed from hosting small boutique parties to staging more than 500 events annually. It has a number of residences in Dubai, Amsterdam, US, Frankfurt, Thailand and the UK. Hedkandi has hosted events at renowned venues including Es Paradis Ibiza, Nikki Beach Miami, Pacha London the Muziekgebouw Concert Hall in Amsterdam, and a solo bar in Koh Samui.

== Radio ==
The Hedkandi radio show is broadcast on over 30 radio stations worldwide and uploaded weekly to Youtube and Mixcloud.

== Compilations ==
Hedkandi has sold more than five million compilation albums to date. Their main genre is vocal house but other dance music genres have been included. The series of albums has distinct illustrations.

A Taste Of

- A Taste of Kandi – Summer 2008 (2008)
- A Taste of Kandi – Summer 2009 (2009)
- A Taste of Kandi – Winter 2008 (2007)
- A Taste of Kandi – Winter 2009 (2008)
- A Taste of Kandi – Winter 2010 (2009)
- A Taste of Kandi – Summer 2011 (2011)
- A Taste of Kandi – Winter 2012 (2011)
- A Taste of Kandi – Summer 2012 (2012)
- A Taste of Kandi 2013 (2013)

Back To Love

- Back To Love (1988-1989)(1999)
- Back To Love 2 (1989) (2000)
- Back To Love 3 (2001)
- Back To Love 03.02 (2002)
- Back To Love 03.03 (2003)
- Back To Love 03.04 (2004)
- Back To Love 03.05 (2005)
- Back To Love (1998-1999)(2006)
- Back To Love (2007)
- Back To Love: The Mix (2008)(1988-2008)
- Back To Love (2013) (1988-2013)
- Back To Love (2017) (1900)

Beach House

- Beach House (2000)
- Beach House 2 (2001)
- Beach House 04.02 (2002)
- Beach House 04.03 (2003)
- Beach House 04.04 (2004)
- Beach House 04.05 (2005)
- Beach House (2006)
- Beach House (2007)
- Beach House (2008) (Australia)
- Beach House (2008) (USA)
- Beach House (2009)
- Beach House (June 1990) (2009)
- Beach House (2010)
- Beach House (2011)
- Beach House (2012)
- Beach House (2013)
- Beach House (2014)
- Beach House (2015)
- Beach House (2016)
- Beach House (2017)

Deeper

- Deeper (2001)
- Deeper 01.02 (2002)

Deep House

- Deep House (2012)
- Deep House (2013)
- Deep House (2014)

Disco Heaven

- Disco Heaven (2002)
- Disco Heaven 02.03 (2003)
- Disco Heaven 01.04 (2004)
- Disco Heaven 01.05 (2005)
- Disco Heaven (2006)
- Disco Heaven (2007)
- Disco Heaven (2008) (Australia)
- Disco Heaven (2008)
- Disco Heaven (2009)
- Disco Heaven (2011)

Disco Kandi

- Disco Kandi (1990s)(2000)
- Disco Kandi 2 (2000)
- Disco Kandi 3 (2001)
- Disco Kandi 4 (2001)
- Disco Kandi 5 (2001)
- Disco Kandi 05.02 (2002)
- Disco Kandi 05.03 (2003)
- Disco Kandi 05.04 (2004)
- Disco Kandi (2005)
- Disco Kandi (2006)
- Disco Kandi: The Mix (2007)
- Disco Kandi (2000-2001) (2009) (USA)

Hed Kandi The Mix

- The Mix: World Series: UK (2003)
- The Mix: Summer 2004 (2004)
- The Mix: Winter 2004 (2004)
- The Mix: 50 (2005)
- The Mix: 2006 (2005)
- The Mix: World Series: Paris (September 2000) (2006)
- The Mix: Summer 2006 (2006)
- Hed Kandi Classics (2006)
- The Mix: Spring 2007
- The Mix: Summer 2007 (2007)
- The Mix: 2008 (2007)
- The Mix: World Series: San Francisco 2008
- The Mix: Summer 2008 (2008)
- The Mix: World Series: Ibiza (2008)
- The Mix: USA 2009 (2008)
- The Mix: 2009 (2008)
- The Mix: 2009 (2008) (Australia)
- The Mix: World Series: Brazil (2009)
- The Mix: 2013 (2012)
- The Mix: 2014 (2013)
- The Mix: 2015 (2014)
- 2016 (2015)
- 2017 (2016)
- 2018 (2017)

"Acoustic"

- Acoustic (2017) (1900)

Kandi Lounge

- Kandi Lounge (2008)
- Kandi Lounge Digital Mix (2008)
- Kandi Lounge (2009)

Nu Cool

- Nu Cool (1998)
- Nu Cool 2 (1998)
- Nu Cool 3 (1999)
- Nu Cool 4 (2000)
- Nu Cool (2005)
- Nu Cool (2006)

Nu Disco

- Nu Disco (2009)
- Nu Disco (2010)
- Nu Disco (2012)

Serve Chilled

- Serve Chilled 1 (1999)
- Serve Chilled 2 (2000)
- Serve Chilled 3 (2001)
- Serve Chilled (2006)
- Serve Chilled (2007)
- Serve Chilled (2008)
- Serve Chilled: Electronic Summer (2011)
- Serve Chilled: Electronic Summer (2012)
- Serve Chilled (2014)
- Serve Chilled (2016)

Stereo Sushi

- Stereo Sushi (1972)(2002)
- Stereo Sushi 2 (1972-1980)(2002)
- Stereo Sushi 3 (1972)(2002)
- Stereo Sushi v. Futomaki (1972)(2003)
- Stereo Sushi v. Wasabi (2003)
- Stereo Sushi v. Sake (1979-1980)(2004)
- Stereo Sushi Teriyaki (1979-1980)(2005)
- Stereo Sushi 8 (2006)
- Stereo Sushi Sashimi (2006)
- Stereo Sushi 10 (2007)
- Stereo Sushi 11 (2007)
- Stereo Sushi 12 (2008)
- Stereo Sushi 13 (October 2004) (2008)
- Stereo Sushi 14 (October 2004) (2008)

Twisted Disco

- Twisted Disco (2003)
- Twisted Disco 03.04 (2004)
- Twisted Disco 02.05 (2005)
- Twisted Disco (2006)
- Twisted Disco (2007)
- Twisted Disco (2008)
- Twisted Disco (2009)
- Twisted Disco (2010)
- Twisted Disco (2011)
- Twisted Disco (2012)

Twisted House (2013)

Winter Chill

- Winter Chill (1999)
- Winter Chill 2 (1980)(2000)
- Winter Chill 3 (2001)
- Winter Chill 06.02 (2002)
- Winter Chill 06.03 (2003)
- Winter Chill 06.04 (2004)
- Winter Chill (2011)

Uncategorized

- Anthems & Artwork (2010)
- Asia Summer (2011)
- Balearica Unplugged (2011)
- Base Ibiza
- Destroy The Disco (2009)
- Fit & Fabulous (2011) (2012) (2013)
- Ibiza (2011) (2012) (2013) (2014)
- Destination Ibiza
- DJ Kandi (2001)
- Es Vive Ibiza
- France Summer (2011)
- Germany Summer (2011)
- Kandi Lounge
- Las Vegas (2009)
- Live
- Miami (2013) (2014)
- Pure Kandi (2009)
- Sampler (2001) (2002) (2003) (2004) (2005) (2006) (2007)
- Swing City Miami (2006)
- Tropical House (2015)

=== Illustrations ===
Hedkandi albums are generally recognizable by their illustrations of a woman dancing or clubbing on the beach, accompanied by Hedkandi's logo and the album name. The original illustrations were created by Jason Brooks and the original logo was designed by Ryan Hughes.
