= The Remix Album (Lisa Stansfield album) =

1998 remix album by Lisa Stansfield

Remix album by Lisa Stansfield
- Released: 2 June 1998
- Recorded: 1997–1998
- Genre: Dance
- Length: 76:03
- Label: Arista
- Producer: Dan Bewick; Black Science Orchestra; Victor Calderone; Ian Devaney; Matt Frost; Hani; Hex Hector; K-Klassic; Frankie Knuckles; Peter Mokran; Mark Picchiotti; Junior Vasquez

Lisa Stansfield chronology
Lisa Stansfield (1997)	The Remix Album (1998)	Swing (1999)

Alternative cover
- North American cover

The Remix Album (titled The #1 Remixes (EP) in North America) is the first remix album by British singer Lisa Stansfield, released by Arista Records on 2 June 1998. It contains remixes of songs originally included on the 1997 album, Lisa Stansfield. The tracks were remixed by prominent US and UK producers: Hex Hector, Junior Vasquez, Victor Calderone, Frankie Knuckles, Hani, K-Klass, Mark Picchiotti, the Black Science Orchestra and the Dirty Rotten Scoundrels. The album garnered favorable reviews from music critics and reached number eighty-two on the Billboard's Top R&B/Hip-Hop Albums chart.

== Background ==
In 1997, Stansfield released her eponymous album, which spawned four number-one singles on the Billboard's Hot Dance Club Songs: "People Hold On" (The Bootleg Mixes), "Never, Never Gonna Give You Up", "Never Gonna Fall" (two weeks at the top) and "I'm Leavin'". This success prompted Arista Records to release the album with remixes of songs from Lisa Stansfield.

== Content ==
The album, titled The #1 Remixes (EP) was released in North America on 2 June 1998. It includes nine tracks remixed by prominent producers: Hex Hector ("I'm Leavin'"), Junior Vasquez and Victor Calderone ("Never Gonna Fall"), Frankie Knuckles and Hani ("Never, Never Gonna Give You Up"), the Dirty Rotten Scoundrels ("People Hold On"), K-Klass ("The Real Thing") and the Black Science Orchestra ("The Line"). In Europe, it was titled The Remix Album and released on 8 June 1998. It contains all the remixes from the North American edition plus one more remix of "The Real Thing" by Mark Picchiotti.

== Critical reception ==
Professional ratings
Review scores
Source	Rating
AllMusic	3/5 stars

The album received positive reviews from music critics. According to Jose F. Promis from AllMusic, it is "more a showcase of hot dance remixers than anything else, which is all fine. It begins with the radio edit of the Hex Hector mix of 'I'm Leavin',' a melancholy ballad that absolutely shines as a dance track, and should have become a hit in a similar vein to Everything but the Girl's 'Missing.' Two mixes are included of her excellent interpretation of Barry White's 'Never, Never Gonna Give You Up,' one being a dreamy, joyful, sophisticated, rather mid-tempo remix courtesy of the legendary Frankie Knuckles, and the other being the revved-up 'Hani Mix.' 'Never Gonna Fall' makes two appearances as clubby remixes, with the Victor Calderone mix being more of a collection of beats than an actual song. A longer mix of the album version of the relentless 'People Hold On' is thrown in, as well as a single-length, funky mix of 'The Real Thing' and a sleek, housy, elegant take on 'The Line.' Promis stated that this album is an absolute must for fans of late-'90s dance music, and especially for fans of this extremely underrated songstress."

== Commercial reception ==
The album entered the Billboard's Top R&B/Hip-Hop Albums chart and peaked at number eighty-two.

== Track listing ==
No.	Title	Writer(s)	Producer(s)	Length
1.	"I'm Leavin'" (Hex Hector Radio Mix)	Crayge Lindesay, Telisa Stinson	Ian Devaney, Peter Mokran	4:17
2.	"Never, Never Gonna Give You Up" (Frankie Knuckles Mix)	Barry White	Devaney, Mokran	8:42
3.	"The Real Thing" (Mark!'s Good Time Disco Vocal)	Lisa Stansfield, Devaney	Devaney, Mokran	11:25
4.	"Never Gonna Fall" (Junior Vasquez Mix)	Stansfield, Devaney	Devaney, Mokran	8:34
5.	"People Hold On" (Dirty Rotten Scoundrels Mix)	Stansfield, Matt Black, Jonathan More	Dan Bewick, Matt Frost	6:11
6.	"Never, Never Gonna Give You Up" (Hani Mix)	White	Devaney, Mokran	8:54
7.	"I'm Leavin'" (Hex Hector Club Mix)	Lindesay, Stinson	Devaney, Mokran	10:06
8.	"Never Gonna Fall" (Victor Calderone Mix)	Stansfield, Devaney	Devaney, Mokran	7:12
9.	"The Real Thing" (K-Klassic Mix)	Stansfield, Devaney	Devaney, Mokran	4:44
10.	"The Line" (The Black Science Orchestra Mix)	Stansfield, Devaney, Terry Gamwell	Devaney, Mokran	5:58

North American edition
No.	Title	Writer(s)	Producer(s)	Length
1.	"I'm Leavin'" (Hex Hector Radio Mix)	Lindesay, Stinson	Devaney, Mokran	4:18
2.	"Never, Never Gonna Give You Up" (Frankie Knuckles Mix)	White	Devaney, Mokran	8:41
3.	"Never Gonna Fall" (Junior Vasquez Mix)	Stansfield, Devaney	Devaney, Mokran	8:35
4.	"People Hold On" (Dirty Rotten Scoundrels Mix)	Stansfield, Black, More	Bewick, Frost	6:11
5.	"Never, Never Gonna Give You Up" (Hani Mix)	White	Devaney, Mokran	8:55
6.	"I'm Leavin'" (Hex Hector Mix)	Lindesay, Stinson	Devaney, Mokran	10:07
7.	"Never Gonna Fall" (Victor Calderone Mix)	Stansfield, Devaney	Devaney, Mokran	7:12
8.	"The Real Thing" (K-Klass Mix)	Stansfield, Devaney	Devaney, Mokran	4:44
9.	"The Line" (The Black Science Orchestra Mix)	Stansfield, Devaney, Gamwell	Devaney, Mokran	5:58

== Charts ==
Chart (1998)	Peak position
US Top R&B/Hip-Hop Albums (Billboard)	82

== Personnel ==
Credits taken from AllMusic.

- Walter Arias – photography
- Ashley Beedle – mix
- Dan Bewick – producer
- Black Science Orchestra – producer
- James Brown – mix
- Mark Burdett – design, art direction
- Terry Burrus – keyboards
- Paul Cairo – bass
- Victor Calderone – producer
- Ian Devaney – original production and mix
- Matt Frost – producer
- Gomi – programming
- Hani – producer
- Hosh Gureli – compiled by
- Hex Hector – producer
- K-Klass – producer
- Frankie Knuckles – producer
- P. Dennis Mitchell – mix
- Peter Mokran – original production and mix
- Joe Moskowitz – keyboards, programming
- Mark Picchiotti – producer
- Mac Quayle – keyboards, programming
- Gary Sanctuary – keyboards
- Steve Smith – percussion
- Lisa Stansfield – vocals
- Junior Vasquez – producer
- Leon Zervos – mastering

== Release history ==
Region	Date	Label	Format	Catalog
North America	2 June 1998	Arista	CD	07822 19012 2
Europe	8 June 1998	Arista	CD	74321 58993 2
