= I'm Leavin' (Lisa Stansfield song) =

Single by Lisa Stansfield

from the album Lisa Stansfield and The Remix Album
- Released: 9 February 1998
- Recorded: 1997
- Genre: R&B; soul
- Length: 4:38
- Label: Arista
- Songwriters: Crayge Lindesay; Taura Stinson
- Producers: Ian Devaney; Peter Mokran

Lisa Stansfield singles chronology
"Don't Cry for Me" (1997)	"I'm Leavin'" (1998)	"The Longer We Make Love" (1999)

"I'm Leavin'" is a song recorded by British singer-songwriter and actress Lisa Stansfield for her 1997 eponymous album. It was written by Crayge Lindesay and Taura Stinson, and produced by Ian Devaney and Peter Mokran. The song was released as the last promotional single from Lisa Stansfield in the United States on 9 February 1998. The track was remixed by Grammy Award-winning American dance producer, Hex Hector. In April 1998, it became Stansfield's seventh song to top the US Billboard Hot Dance Club Songs chart and fourth from Lisa Stansfield to do so (following "People Hold On" (The Bootleg Mixes), "Never, Never Gonna Give You Up" and "Never Gonna Fall").

This success on the dance chart prompted Arista Records to release The Remix Album in June 1998, which included two remixes of "I'm Leavin'." Eight years later, on 6 June 2006, Dance Vault Mixes with five of Hex Hector remixes were released digitally in the United States. In 2014, "I'm Leavin'" (Hex Hector N.Y.C. Rough Mix) was included on People Hold On ... The Remix Anthology and The Collection 1989–2003. In June 1998, "I'm Leavin'" also promoted The Remix Album on Polish radio, reaching number three on the airplay chart.

== Critical reception ==
The song received favorable reviews from music critics, who called it a melancholy ballad that "absolutely shines" as a dance track, and should have become a hit. Larry Flick from Billboard magazine described the song as a "intensely soulful, heartbreaking ballad" and noted further that Stansfield "offers her strongest, most commercially viable single" since "All Woman". He also stated that "lyrically, it stretches miles beyond standard love-gone-wrong fodder, and La Lisa delivers a vocal that is straight from the gut. Every syllable drips with raw, empathetic emotion. If you're not in the mood for a slow jam". Natasha Stovall from Rolling Stone commented that Stansfield sounds "edgy – even harsh – when she's staring, eyes appropriately red-rimmed, at a broken affair" in the song.

== Track listings ==
- US promotional CD single
1. "I'm Leavin'" (Radio Mix) – 4:18
2. "I'm Leavin'" (Album Version) – 4:37
- US promotional 12" single (Hex Hector Remixes)
1. "I'm Leavin'" (Main Club Mix) – 10:08
2. "I'm Leavin'" (Radio Mix) – 4:19
3. "I'm Leavin'" (NYC Rough Mix) – 10:08
4. "I'm Leavin'" (Leavin' Drums) – 3:07
- European promotional CD single
1. "I'm Leavin'" (Hex Hector Radio Mix) – 4:17
2. "I'm Leavin'" (Hex Hector Club Mix) – 10:06
- UK promotional 12" single
1. "I'm Leavin'" (Hex Hector Club Mix) – 10:06
2. "Never, Never Gonna Give You Up" (Hani) – 8:54
3. "Never Gonna Fall" (Victor Calderone) – 7:12
- 2006 US digital Dance Vault Mixes
1. "I'm Leavin'" (Main Club Mix) – 10:08
2. "I'm Leavin'" (Main Club with Edit) – 9:53
3. "I'm Leavin'" (Radio Mix) – 4:19
4. "I'm Leavin'" (NYC Rough Mix) – 10:09
5. "I'm Leavin'" (Drums) – 3:08

== Charts ==
=== Weekly charts ===
Weekly chart performance for "I'm Leavin'"
Chart (1998)	Peak position
Poland Airplay (Music & Media)	3
US Dance Club Songs (Billboard)	1

=== Year-end charts ===
Year-end chart performance for "I'm Leavin'"
Chart (1998)	Position
US Dance Club Songs (Billboard)	27

== See also ==
- List of number-one dance singles of 1998 (U.S.)
