= The Line (Lisa Stansfield song) =

Single by Lisa Stansfield

from the album Lisa Stansfield
- Released: 22 September 1997
- Recorded: 1997
- Genre: R&B; dance; pop; funk
- Length: 4:26
- Label: Arista
- Songwriters: Lisa Stansfield; Ian Devaney; Terry Gamwell
- Producers: Ian Devaney; Peter Mokran

Lisa Stansfield singles chronology
"Never, Never Gonna Give You Up" (1997)	"The Line" (1997)	"Never Gonna Fall" (1997)

Music video
- "The Line" on YouTube

"The Line" is a song recorded by British singer, songwriter and actress Lisa Stansfield, released as the third European single from her eponymous album (1997). It was written by Stansfield, Ian Devaney and Terry Gamwell, and produced by Devaney and Peter Mokran. Released as a single in Europe on 22 September 1997, it reached number sixty-four in the United Kingdom. The song also received positive reviews from music critics.

The single included remixes created by various British producers: The Boilerhouse Boys, Ashley Beedle, Black Science Orchestra, Ian O'Brien, Snowboy, Danny Breaks and Mark Mendoza. An accompanying music video, directed by Rocky Schenck, was also released. After that, Stansfield embarked on a mini-tour in the United Kingdom in October and November 1997.

"The Line" (The Black Science Orchestra Mix) was later included on The Remix Album (1998) and on the two-CD edition of Biography: The Greatest Hits (2003). In 2014, remixes of "The Line" were included on the deluxe 2CD + DVD re-release of Lisa Stansfield. Additional remixes were featured on People Hold On ... The Remix Anthology (2014). All was included on The Collection 1989–2003.

== Critical reception ==
Pan-European magazine Music & Media felt that this track does much to reaffirm Lisa Stansfield's status as one of the UK's leading R&B artists. They added, "A midtempo number, The Line shows her at her very best and a host of cleverly constructed remixes are worthy of further investigation by more adventurous music programmers." An editor, Dominic Pride, described it as a "funky strut". Music Week gave it three out of five, noting that "Stansfield finds herself in laid-back, funky mode on this upbeat groove which makes the most of its simple, rhythmic qualities." Press of Atlantic City wrote that the singer "shines" on the "funky" song.

== Track listings ==
- European CD and UK cassette single
1. "The Line" (Album Edit) – 3:34
2. "The Line" (Boilerhouse Radio Edit) – 4:05
- European CD maxi-single
1. "The Line" (Album Edit) – 3:34
2. "The Line" (Boilerhouse Radio Edit) – 4:05
3. "The Line" (Pure Funk Radio Edit) – 3:28
4. "The Line" (Black Science Magic Vocal) – 6:14
5. "The Line" (Ian O'Brien's Desert Funk Mix) – 8:37
6. "The Line" (Snowboy's Extended Mix) – 4:20
7. "The Line" (Loop Da Loop Gangster House Mix) – 6:56
- European 12" single
1. "The Line" (Black Science Magic Vocal) – 6:14
2. "The Line" (Loop Da Loop Gangster House Mix) – 6:56
3. "The Line" (Hippie Torrales Mentor Mix) – 6:41
4. "The Line" (Ian O'Brien's Desert Funk Mix) – 8:37
- UK promotional CD single
1. "The Line" (Album Edit) – 3:34
2. "The Line" (Boilerhouse Radio Edit) – 4:05
3. "The Line" (Pure Funk Radio Edit) – 3:28
4. "The Line" (Hippie Torrales Radio Edit) – 3:39
5. "The Line" (Snowboy Radio Edit) – 3:33
- UK promotional 12" single (The Loop Da Loop Mixes)
1. "The Line" (Loop Da Loop Uptown Mix) – 7:50
2. "The Line" (Loop Da Loop Downtown Mix) – 7:48
- UK promotional 12" single (The Vocal Sessions)
1. "The Line" (Black Science Magic Vocal) – 6:14
2. "The Line" (Hippie Torrales Mix) – 6:41
- UK promotional 12" single (The Funk Sessions)
1. "The Line" (Pure Funk Mix) – 4:20
2. "The Line" (Devaney & Mokran Mix) – 5:55
- UK promotional 12" single (Ian O'Brien Remixes)
1. "The Line" (Ian O'Brien's Desert Funk Mix) – 8:37
2. "The Line" (Ian O'Brien's Benfleet 3:30 Mix) – 10:06
- UK promotional 12" single
1. "The Line" (Boilerhouse Mix) – 4:05
2. "The Line" (Snowboy Extended Mix) – 4:20
- European promotional 12" single (Black Science Magic Sessions)
1. "The Line" (Black Science Magic Session Part 1) – 5:51
2. "The Line" (Black Science Magic Session Part 2) – 6:29
- European promotional 12" single (Unreleased Pressure)
1. "The Line" (Ian O'Brien's Benfleet 3:30 Mix) – 10:06
2. "The Line" (Loop Da Loop Downtown Dub) – 5:22
- Other remixes
1. "The Line" (The Black Science Orchestra Mix) – 5:58

== Charts ==
=== Weekly charts ===
Weekly chart performance for "The Line"
Chart (1997)	Peak position
Europe Radio Top 50 (Music & Media)	39
Hungary Airplay (Music & Media)	12
Poland Airplay (Music & Media)	12
Scotland Singles (OCC)	83
Spain Airplay (Music & Media)	7
UK Singles (OCC)	64
UK Hip Hop/R&B (OCC)	16

=== Year-end charts ===
Year-end chart performance for "The Line"
Chart (1997)	Position
UK Club Chart (Music Week)	93
