= Lisa Stansfield (album) =

Studio album by Lisa Stansfield
- Released: 21 March 1997
- Recorded: 1996–1997
- Genres: R&B; soul; dance; pop; funk
- Length: 77:02
- Label: Arista
- Producers: Dan Bewick; Ian Devaney; Matt Frost; Peter Mokran; Mark Morales; Cory Rooney

Lisa Stansfield chronology
In Session (1996)	Lisa Stansfield (1997)	The Remix Album (1998)

Alternative cover
- North American cover

Singles from Lisa Stansfield
- 1. "People Hold On (The Bootleg Mixes)" Released: 6 January 1997; 2. "The Real Thing" Released: 10 March 1997; 3. "Never, Never Gonna Give You Up" Released: 9 June 1997; 4. "The Line" Released: 22 September 1997; 5. "Never Gonna Fall" Released: 27 October 1997; 6. "Don't Cry for Me" Released: 17 November 1997; 7. "I'm Leavin'" Released: 9 February 1998

Lisa Stansfield is the fourth solo studio album by British singer Lisa Stansfield, released by Arista Records on 21 March 1997. It was her first new studio album since 1993's So Natural. Stansfield co-wrote most songs for the album with her husband Ian Devaney. The tracks were produced by Devaney and Peter Mokran. Lisa Stansfield garnered favourable reviews from music critics and was commercially successful, reaching number two in the United Kingdom and receiving Gold certification. In the United States, it spawned four number-one singles on Billboard's Hot Dance Club Songs. Lisa Stansfield was rereleased as a deluxe 2CD + DVD set in Europe in November 2014.

== Background ==
Stansfield released the album in March 1997, almost four years after her previous studio album, So Natural. It does not feature contribution from Andy Morris, who worked on Stansfield's previous releases. Between So Natural and Lisa Stansfield, she recorded and released two singles from the 1994 soundtracks: "Make It Right" from Beverly Hills 90210: The College Years and "Dream Away" (duet with Babyface) from The Pagemaster.

== Content ==
Lisa Stansfield was produced by Ian Devaney and Peter Mokran. It includes sixteen songs, mainly written by Stansfield and Devaney. Four songs were co-written by Richard Darbyshire, (frontman of the British band Living in a Box). "I Cried My Last Tear Last Night" was written by Diane Warren. The album also contains two covers: Barry White's "Never, Never Gonna Give You Up" and Phyllis Hyman's "You Know How to Love Me." In Europe and North America, Lisa Stansfield was released with bonus remixes of "The Real Thing" and "People Hold On". In Japan, bonus tracks included "People Hold On" (Bootleg Mix) and a cover of Player's song, "Baby Come Back". In 2003, the album was remastered and re-released with three bonus songs: "People Hold On" (Bootleg Mix), "Baby Come Back" and "Breathtaking", B-side of the withdrawn single "Don't Cry for Me".

Lisa Stansfield was remastered and expanded, and was re-released as a deluxe 2CD + DVD set in November 2014. This edition was expanded to feature rare tracks and 12" mixes plus videos, live footage and a specially recorded interview with Stansfield. The twenty-eight-page booklet features photos, memorabilia, lyrics and brand new sleeve notes. The set was issued in the United Kingdom on 10 November 2014 and in Europe on 21 November 2014. It was also released as a part of The Collection 1989–2003 at the same time. The 2014 reissue of Lisa Stansfield includes previously unreleased track, "The Real Thing" (Silk's Real House Thang). Additionally, People Hold On ... The Remix Anthology features the following previously unreleased remixes of songs from Lisa Stansfield: "Never Gonna Fall" (Wyclef Remix) and three remixes of "Never, Never Gonna Give You Up" (Frankie's Classic Club Mix, Franktified Off the Hook Dub and After Hours Mix).

== Singles ==
In January 1997, Arista Records released "People Hold On" (The Bootleg Mixes) as a single. The song, originally recorded by Coldcut and Stansfield in 1989, was remixed by the Dirty Rotten Scoundrels. The remix version reached number one on the Billboard's Hot Dance Club Songs, number four on the UK Singles Chart and number fifteen on the Irish Singles Chart. After this success, "People Hold On" (Bootleg Mix) was included on Lisa Stansfield as a bonus track. The first proper single form the album, "The Real Thing" was released in Europe, Australia and Japan in March 1997. The song peaked at number nine in the United Kingdom. "Never, Never Gonna Give You Up" was chosen as the next single in Europe, Australia and Japan, and first proper single in North America. It was released in June 1997. The song reached number twenty-five in the United Kingdom, number seventy-four on the Billboard Hot 100 and number one on the Hot Dance Club Songs chart. In September 1997, "The Line" was issued as a single in Europe and peaked at number sixty-four in the United Kingdom. "Never Gonna Fall" (remixed by Junior Vasquez and Victor Calderone) was chosen as next promotional single in the United States and released in October 1997, also reaching number one on the Hot Dance Club Songs (for two weeks). The single "Don't Cry for Me," set for release in Europe in November 1997, was withdrawn at the last minute. After the success on the dance charts in the United States, Arista Records issued one more promotional single, "I'm Leavin'" (remixed by Hex Hector) which also topped the Hot Dance Club Songs, becoming the fourth song from Lisa Stansfield to do so. Because of that, The Remix Album was released in June 1998.

== Critical reception ==
Professional ratings
Review scores
Source	Rating
AllMusic	4/5 stars
Robert Christgau	(dud)
Entertainment Weekly	B−
The Guardian	3/5 stars
Q	3/5 stars
Rolling Stone	3/5 stars
The Times	(favorable)

Lisa Stansfield received positive reviews from music critics. According to Stephen Thomas Erlewine from AllMusic, the album "finds Stansfield at the top of her game, turning in a stylish set of smooth, disco-inflected dance-pop. The songs, from a cover of Barry White's 'Never, Never Gonna Give You Up' and 'Never Gonna Fall' to the ballad 'I Cried My Last Tear Last Night,' are uniformly strong and the singer's voice is seductive and sexy, making the album a small gem in her catalog." Josef Woodard from Entertainment Weekly wrote that Stansfield "plays her old-school R&B straight, unleashing white-soul-queen riffs over disco grooves or pop-soul ballads spiced with horns, strings, and backup vocals. She does right by Phyllis Hyman's hit 'You Know How to Love Me' with one foot in the happy-face '70s." Q stated that "Stansfield's excellent singing remains on a par with the best American female R&B and the songs are consistently superior." According to Natasha Stovall from Rolling Stone, "unlike many of her peers from England, Stansfield is not jumping on the latest UK dance trend. On her new album, the bass thumps quaintly along, and the drums are as mellow as tea and biscuits. The heat comes from Stansfield, who belts her heart out in a voice that's smooth and pliant when she's falling in love again ('The Real Thing') but edgy – even harsh – when she's staring, eyes appropriately red-rimmed, at a broken affair ('I'm Leavin''). Stovall added that Stansfield will always fit more smoothly in a smoky piano bar than in the strobe-lit warehouse of a moody DJ star."

== Commercial performance ==
Lisa Stansfield performed well on the charts peaking at number two in the United Kingdom and being certified Gold. It also reached top ten in Belgium and Italy, peaking at number six in Belgium Flanders, number seven in Belgium Wallonia and number eight in Italy. It also peaked at number eight on the European Top 100 Albums. Lisa Stansfield was certified Gold in Switzerland and Spain, where it reached numbers 11 and 23 respectively. The album also peaked inside top forty in other European countries, including number 12 in Austria and Greece, number 13 in France and Germany, number 14 in Sweden, number 18 in the Netherlands, number 34 in Hungary and 38 in Finland. In other parts of the world, Lisa Stansfield reached number 40 in Japan and was certified Gold. It also reached number 41 in Australia, number 46 in New Zealand and 99 in Canada. In the United States, it peaked at number 55 on the Billboard 200 and number 30 on the Top R&B/Hip-Hop Albums.

== Track listing ==
No.	Title	Writer(s)	Producer(s)	Length
1.	"Never Gonna Fall"	Lisa Stansfield, Ian Devaney	Ian Devaney, Peter Mokran	5:16
2.	"The Real Thing"	Stansfield, Devaney	Devaney, Mokran	4:20
3.	"I'm Leavin'"	Crayge Lindesay, Taura Stinson	Devaney, Mokran	4:38
4.	"Suzanne"	Stansfield, Devaney	Devaney, Mokran	4:59
5.	"Never, Never Gonna Give You Up"	Barry White	Devaney, Mokran	5:02
6.	"Don't Cry for Me"	Stansfield, Devaney, Cory Rooney, Mark Morales	Devaney, Mokran, Rooney, Morales	5:03
7.	"The Line"	Stansfield, Devaney, Terry Gamwell	Devaney, Mokran	4:26
8.	"The Very Thought of You"	Stansfield, Devaney, Richard Darbyshire	Devaney, Mokran	5:23
9.	"You Know How to Love Me"	Reggie Lucas, James Mtume	Devaney, Mokran	5:32
10.	"I Cried My Last Tear Last Night"	Diane Warren	Devaney, Mokran	4:13
11.	"Honest"	Stansfield, Devaney, Darbyshire	Devaney, Mokran	4:54
12.	"Somewhere in Time"	Stansfield, Devaney, Darbyshire	Devaney, Mokran	4:44
13.	"Got Me Missing You"	Stansfield, Devaney	Devaney, Mokran	4:43
14.	"Footsteps"	Stansfield, Devaney, Darbyshire, Frank Musker	Devaney, Mokran	3:48

European/North American bonus tracks
No.	Title	Writer(s)	Producer(s)	Length
15.	"The Real Thing" (Touch Mix)	Stansfield, Devaney	Devaney, Mokran	5:37
16.	"People Hold On" (Bootleg Mix)	Stansfield, Matt Black, Jonathan More	Dan Bewick, Matt Frost	3:43

Japanese bonus tracks
No.	Title	Writer(s)	Producer(s)	Length
15.	"Baby Come Back"	J.C. Crowley, Peter Beckett	Devaney, Mokran	3:34
16.	"People Hold On" (Bootleg Mix)	Stansfield, Black, More	Bewick, Frost	3:43

2003 remastered edition bonus tracks
No.	Title	Writer(s)	Producer(s)	Length
15.	"People Hold On" (Bootleg Mix)	Stansfield, Black, More	Bewick, Frost	3:43
16.	"Breathtaking"	Stansfield, Devaney	Devaney	4:50
17.	"Baby Come Back"	Crowley, Beckett	Devaney, Mokran	3:34

2014 expanded 2CD + DVD set (disc one – CD)
No.	Title	Writer(s)	Producer(s)	Length
1.	"Never Gonna Fall"	Stansfield, Devaney	Devaney, Mokran	5:16
2.	"The Real Thing"	Stansfield, Devaney	Devaney, Mokran	4:20
3.	"I'm Leavin'"	Lindesay, Stinson	Devaney, Mokran	4:38
4.	"Suzanne"	Stansfield, Devaney	Devaney, Mokran	4:59
5.	"Never, Never Gonna Give You Up"	White	Devaney, Mokran	5:02
6.	"Don't Cry for Me"	Stansfield, Devaney, Rooney, Morales	Devaney, Mokran, Rooney, Morales	5:03
7.	"The Line"	Stansfield, Devaney, Gamwell	Devaney, Mokran	4:26
8.	"The Very Thought of You"	Stansfield, Devaney, Darbyshire	Devaney, Mokran	5:23
9.	"You Know How to Love Me"	Lucas, Mtume	Devaney, Mokran	5:32
10.	"I Cried My Last Tear Last Night"	Warren	Devaney, Mokran	4:13
11.	"Honest"	Stansfield, Devaney, Darbyshire	Devaney, Mokran	4:54
12.	"Somewhere in Time"	Stansfield, Devaney, Darbyshire	Devaney, Mokran	4:44
13.	"Got Me Missing You"	Stansfield, Devaney	Devaney, Mokran	4:43
14.	"Footsteps"	Stansfield, Devaney, Darbyshire, Musker	Devaney, Mokran	3:48
15.	"Baby Come Back"	Crowley, Beckett	Devaney, Mokran	4:43
16.	"People Hold On" (Jon Is the Don Mix)	Stansfield, Black, More	Bewick, Frost	8:09

2014 expanded 2CD + DVD set (disc two – CD)
No.	Title	Writer(s)	Producer(s)	Length
1.	"The Real Thing" (Touch Extended Mix)	Stansfield, Devaney	Devaney, Mokran	6:27
2.	"Breathtaking"	Stansfield, Devaney	Devaney	4:50
3.	"You Get Me"	Stansfield, Devaney, Darbyshire	Devaney	5:37
4.	"Never, Never Gonna Give You Up" (77th Heaven Mix)	White	Devaney, Mokran	7:10
5.	"The Line" (Devaney & Mokran Mix)	Stansfield, Devaney, Gamwell	Devaney, Mokran	5:55
6.	"The Real Thing" (Silk's Real House Thang)	Stansfield, Devaney	Devaney, Mokran	9:45
7.	"Never, Never Gonna Give You Up" (Frankie's Hard R&B Club Mix)	White	Devaney, Mokran	6:54
8.	"The Line" (Hippie Torrales Mix)	Stansfield, Devaney, Gamwell	Devaney, Mokran	6:41
9.	"The Real Thing" (Dirty Rotten Scoundrels Vocal Mix)	Stansfield, Devaney	Devaney, Mokran	7:38
10.	"Never, Never Gonna Give You Up" (Nikolas & Sibley Club Mix)	White	Devaney, Mokran	8:36
11.	"Never Gonna Fall" (Junior's Return To 27th & 10th Anthem)	Stansfield, Devaney	Devaney, Mokran	10:23

2014 expanded 2CD + DVD set (disc three – DVD)
No.	Title	Writer(s)	Producer(s)	Length
1.	"The Real Thing" (Promo Video)	Stansfield, Devaney	Devaney, Mokran
2.	"Never, Never Gonna Give You Up" (Promo Video)	White	Devaney, Mokran
3.	"The Line" (Promo Video)	Stansfield, Devaney, Gamwell	Devaney, Mokran
4.	"Don't Cry for Me" (Promo Video)	Stansfield, Devaney, Rooney, Morales	Devaney, Mokran, Rooney, Morales
5.	"People Hold On" (Bootleg Mix) (Promo Video)	Stansfield, Black, More	Bewick, Frost
6.	"Never, Never Gonna Give You Up" (US Edit) (Promo Video)	White	Devaney, Mokran
7.	"The Real Thing" (Live at Riverside Studios, 1997)	Stansfield, Devaney	Devaney, Mokran
8.	"I'm Leavin'" (Live at Riverside Studios, 1997)	Lindesay, Stinson	Devaney, Mokran
9.	"People Hold On" (Live at Riverside Studios, 1997)	Stansfield, Black, More	Bewick, Frost
10.	"Suzanne" (Live at Riverside Studios, 1997)	Stansfield, Devaney	Devaney, Mokran
11.	"Don't Cry for Me" (Live at Riverside Studios, 1997)	Stansfield, Devaney, Rooney, Morales	Devaney, Mokran, Rooney, Morales
12.	"Never, Never Gonna Give You Up" (Live at Riverside Studios, 1997)	White	Devaney, Mokran
13.	"Change" (Live at Riverside Studios, 1997)	Stansfield, Devaney, Morris	Devaney, Morris
14.	"You Know How to Love Me" (Live at Riverside Studios, 1997)	Lucas, Mtume	Devaney, Mokran
15.	"The Line" (Live at Riverside Studios, 1997)	Stansfield, Devaney, Gamwell	Devaney, Mokran
16.	"All Around the World" (Live at Riverside Studios, 1997)	Stansfield, Devaney, Morris	Devaney, Morris
17.	"2014 Interview with Mark Goodier"

== Credits and personnel ==
Credits taken from AllMusic.

- Gareth Ashton – assistant engineer
- Jon Bailey – assistant engineer
- Dan Bewick – remixer, producer
- Vivien Birdsall – strings
- Mark Burdett – art direction
- Martin Clark – strings
- Luis Conte – percussion
- Gary J. Crockett – bass
- Richard Darbyshire – arranger
- Snake Davis – saxophone, flute, horn arrangements
- Ian Devaney – producer, arranger, keyboards, guitar, programming, mix, horn arrangements, string arrangements
- Clare Dixon – strings
- Kate Evans – strings
- Matt Frost – remixer, producer
- Stephanie Glyden – assistant engineer
- Ricky Graham – assistant engineer
- Gary Grant – trumpet, flugelhorn
- Andy Grassi – assistant engineer
- Bernie Grundman – mastering
- Drusilla Harris – strings
- Jerry Hey – trumpet, flugelhorn, horn arrangements
- Dan Higgins – flute, saxophone
- Julia Hoyle – strings
- Rita Karidis – design
- Neil Kirk – photography
- Conal Markey – assistant engineer
- Aidan McGovern – engineer
- Aileen McLaughlin – background vocals
- Doug Michael – assistant engineer
- Peter Mokran – producer, arranger, keyboards, guitar, programming, mix
- Des Moore – guitar
- Mark Morales – producer
- Jan Nossek – strings
- Michael O'Donovan – assistant engineer
- Sean O'Dwyer – assistant engineer
- Louise Peacock – strings
- Christopher Marc Potter – assistant engineer
- Melvin "Wah-Wah Watson" Ragin – guitar
- Bill Reichenbach Jr. – trombone
- Cory Rooney – producer
- Anna Ross – background vocals
- Richard Simpson – assistant engineer
- Snowboy – percussion
- Lisa Stansfield – vocals, background vocals, arranger
- Neil Stubenhaus – bass
- Richard Thirlwell – strings
- John Thirkell – trumpet, horn arrangements
- Simon Vance – strings
- Min Yang – strings

== Charts ==
=== Weekly charts ===
Weekly chart performance for Lisa Stansfield
Chart (1997)	Peak position
Australian Albums (ARIA)	41
Austrian Albums (Ö3 Austria)	12
Belgian Albums (Ultratop Flanders)	6
Belgian Albums (Ultratop Wallonia)	7
Canada Top Albums/CDs (RPM)	99
Dutch Albums (Album Top 100)	18
European Albums (Top 100)	8
Finnish Albums (Suomen virallinen lista)	38
French Albums (SNEP)	13
German Albums (Offizielle Top 100)	13
Greek Albums (IFPI)	12
Hungarian Albums (MAHASZ)	34
Italian Albums (FIMI)	8
Japanese Albums (Oricon)	40
New Zealand Albums (RMNZ)	46
Scottish Albums (Official Charts)	20
Spanish Albums (PROMUSICAE)	23
Swedish Albums (Sverigetopplistan)	14
Swiss Albums (Schweizer Hitparade)	11
UK Albums (Official Charts)	2
UK R&B Albums (Official Charts)	1
US Billboard 200	55
US Top R&B/Hip-Hop Albums (Billboard)	30

=== Year-end charts ===
Year-end chart performance for Lisa Stansfield
Chart (1997)	Position
Belgian Albums (Ultratop Flanders)	73
Belgian Albums (Ultratop Wallonia)	71
European Albums (Top 100)	72
German Albums (Offizielle Top 100)	56
Swiss Albums (Schweizer Hitparade)	34
UK Albums (OCC)	78

== Certifications and sales ==
Certifications and sales for Lisa Stansfield
Region	Certification	Certified units/sales
Japan (RIAJ)	Gold	100,000^{^}
Spain (Promusicae)	Gold	50,000^{^}
Switzerland (IFPI Switzerland)	Gold	25,000^{^}
United Kingdom (BPI)	Gold	100,000^{^}
^{^} Shipments figures based on certification alone.

== Release history ==
Release history for Lisa Stansfield
Region	Date	Label	Format	Catalog
Japan	21 March 1997	Arista	CD	BVCA-725
Europe	24 March 1997	Arista	CD	74321 45851 2
Australia	15 April 1997	Arista	CD	74321 45851 2
North America	29 July 1997	Arista	CD	07822 18738 2
Europe	2 June 2003	Arista	CD	28765 22392 8
United Kingdom	10 November 2014	Edsel	2CD+DVD	EDSG 8056
Europe	21 November 2014	Edsel	2CD+DVD	EDSG 8056
