= The Real Thing (Lisa Stansfield song) =

1997 single by Lisa Standfield

Single by Lisa Stansfield

from the album Lisa Stansfield and Money Talks soundtrack
- Released: 10 March 1997
- Length: 4:20
- Label: Arista
- Songwriters: Lisa Stansfield; Ian Devaney
- Producers: Ian Devaney; Peter Mokran

Lisa Stansfield singles chronology
""People Hold On" (The Bootleg Mixes)" (1997)	"The Real Thing" (1997)	"Never, Never Gonna Give You Up" (1997)

Music video
- "The Real Thing" on YouTube

"The Real Thing" is a song by British singer-songwriter Lisa Stansfield from her 1997 eponymous album. It was released by Arista as the first proper single from Lisa Stansfield in Europe, Australia and Japan on 10 March 1997, after "People Hold On" (The Bootleg Mixes). The song is written by Stansfield and Ian Devaney, and produced by Devaney and Peter Mokran. The CD single included remixes created by prominent US and UK producers: Mark Picchiotti, K-Klass and the Dirty Rotten Scoundrels. "The Real Thing" reached number nine on the UK Singles Chart and topped the Spanish airplay chart. In August 1997, it was included on the Money Talks soundtrack. Later, it was included on The Remix Album and Biography: The Greatest Hits. Michael Geoghegan directed the music video for the song.

In 2014, remixes of "The Real Thing" were included on the deluxe 2CD + DVD re-release of Lisa Stansfield. Additional remixes were featured on People Hold On ... The Remix Anthology (2014). The previously unreleased remix, Silk's Real House Thang was also included. All was included on The Collection 1989–2003.

== Critical reception ==
"The Real Thing sums up what I'm all about and I think it's what people expect of me. It's very much going back to the very first album and it's a good dance thing as well."

— Stansfield talking to Music & Media about the song.

"The Real Thing" received positive reviews from many music critics. Swedish Aftonbladet praised the song as a "real hit". George Bowie from Evening Times declared it a "stunning" new single. Caroline Sullivan for The Guardian complimented "those lush cellos and saxes [that] envelop [it]", describing it as a song about "adultery". Irish Independent named it one of the "moments" of the Lisa Stansfield album, calling it "superb". Kevin Courtney from Irish Times said, "The Lancashire Lassie still knows how to funk it oop, and this another typical sample of classic Stansfield soul." He also named it "another sure fire hit for the Black Country diva."

Dominic Pride from Music & Media noted that it has "sharp horns and an anthemic chorus." Ralph Tee from Music Week's RM wrote, "Vocally she's as great as ever, the song melodic and chirpy if not particularly ground breaking." A reviewer from People Magazine remarked that Stansfield is "singing circles around the wah-wah-spiked melodies" of "Never Gonna Fall" and "The Real Thing", "without resorting to gut-busting theatrics." Press of Atlantic City opined that the singer "shines" on "the horn-spiced" song. Natasha Stovall from Rolling Stone constated, "The heat comes from Stansfield, who belts her heart out in a voice that's smooth and pliant when she's falling in love again."

== Chart performance ==
"The Real Thing" peaked at number one on Spain's AFYVE airplay chart and was a top-five hit in Hungary, peaking at number four. It also peaked at number nine in the UK and number 10 in Italy. In the UK, the single peaked during its first week on the UK Singles Chart, on 16 March 1997. It was Stansfield's last top-10 hit in the UK as of 2026. On the UK R&B Singles Chart, it reached number three. Additionally, "The Real Thing" was a top-20 hit in Scotland, a top-30 hit in Poland and Wallonia, and a top-40 hit in Flanders and Iceland. Outside Europe, it became a top-20 hit in Israel, peaking at number 13 on 6 May 1997. It also charted in Australia, peaking at only number 124.

== Music video ==
An accompanying music video was produced to promote the single, directed by Irish filmmaker Michael Geoghegan. It was later made available on Stansfield's official YouTube channel in 2014 and had generated more than ten million views as of October 2023.

In the video, we follow three different young people. Stansfield appears as a mysterious figure with magical abilities, watching and singing to them. The first scene is at the home of a young woman, who are apparently upset and hiding in her bedroom. As Stansfield sings, magic dust appears on a phone. After taking the call, the woman is smiling and on her way out. The next scene is at a hair salon, where a female hairdresser are closing. With Stansfield there, magic dust appears so the door sign turns from 'Closed' to 'Open' again. A man then enters and after the woman is persuaded, she starts shaving off his hair. Magic dust appears on the machine cutter, and in the next moment they are embracing and kissing each other. In the last scene, the singer is in a nightclub. A gay man is sitting by himself, watching another man who is talking to his friends. Clearly down, he is getting ready to leave. After Stansfield walks up to him and singing to him, magic dust then appears over him. Couraged by this, he gets in touch with the other man, who willingly leaves his friends to join the man. As the video ends, people in the club are watching the couple leaving while Stansfield sings the last stanzas.

== Track listings ==
- European CD single
1. "The Real Thing" (radio edit) – 4:01
2. "The Real Thing" (Mark!'s radio edit) – 3:56
- Australian, European, Japanese, and UK CD maxi-single
1. "The Real Thing" (radio edit) – 4:01
2. "The Real Thing" (Touch mix) – 5:36
3. "The Real Thing" (Dirty Rotten Scoundrels's vocal mix) – 7:10
4. "People Hold On" (Jon Is the Don mix) – 8:08
- Australian and UK CD maxi-single 2
1. "The Real Thing" (radio edit) – 4:01
2. "The Real Thing" (Mark!'s radio edit) – 3:56
3. "The Real Thing" (Mark!'s Good Time Disco vocal) – 11:25
4. "The Real Thing" (Mark!'s Shelter vocal) – 9:48
5. "The Real Thing" (K-Klassic mix) – 8:39
- European and UK 12-inch single
1. "The Real Thing" (Mark!'s Good Time Disco vocal) – 11:25
2. "The Real Thing" (K-Klassic mix) – 8:39
3. "The Real Thing" (Dirty Rotten Scoundrel's Vocal mix) – 7:38

== Charts ==
=== Weekly charts ===
Weekly chart performance for "The Real Thing"
Chart (1997)	Peak position
Australia (ARIA)	124
Belgium (Ultratop 50 Flanders)	38
Belgium (Ultratop 50 Wallonia)	29
Europe (Eurochart Hot 100)	29
European Radio Top 50 (Music & Media)	1
France Airplay (Music & Media)	12
Germany (GfK)	57
Hungary (Mahasz)	4
Hungary Airplay (Music & Media)	11
Iceland (Íslenski Listinn Topp 40)	32
Israel (Israeli Singles Chart)	13
Italy (Musica e dischi)	10
Italy Airplay (Music & Media)	1
Netherlands (Dutch Top 40 Tipparade)	7
Netherlands (Single Top 100)	61
Poland Airplay (Music & Media)	1
Scottish Singles Sales (Official Charts)	18
Spain Radio (AFYVE)	1
Sweden (Sverigetopplistan)	49
UK Singles (Official Charts)	9
UK Hip Hop/R&B (Official Charts)	3

=== Year-end charts ===
Year-end chart performance for "The Real Thing"
Chart (1997)	Position
Europe Radio Top 50 (Music & Media)	7
UK Singles (OCC)	174
