= Faze Action =

British dance music band

Faze Action are a British dance music band, composed of brothers Simon and Robin Lee.

Over the years, Faze Action blended house music with Western classical, pan-African, and Latin music. Its music is also heavily influenced by funk, disco, and jazz.

The Lee brothers grew up in Amersham, Buckinghamshire, England, and they were both interested in music from an early age. Robin went on to study music at Goldsmiths College in London.

The pair collaborated in 1995 to produce the Original Disco Motion EP, which was supported by DJs such as François Kevorkian. Shortly afterwards Robin moved to Osaka, Japan, to work as an English teacher. Meanwhile, the success of the group's debut EP won it a contract with Nuphonic Records. The pair then in 1996 produced a single called "In the Trees", which won them increased exposure and is still probably its most famous track. In conjunction with a reissue of the track in the winter of 2007, a number of remixes were also released by Carl Craig, Jerome Sydenham, and Tiger Stripes.

After Robin returned to the UK, the pair released its first album, 1997's Plans and Designs. The pair has subsequently released a number of singles and albums; their tracks have been remixed by Rae and Christian and Cinematic Orchestra.

In the United States, an album, Moving Cities (1999), was licensed to F-111/Warner Bros. Records.

Faze Action have a long list of remix credits that include Yellow Sox, Diana Brown, D*Note, Femi Kuti, Serge Gainsbourg, Metronomy, Ibibio Sound Machine, Francois Kevorkian and Saint Etienne.

June 2009 saw the release of their album Stratus Energy, which featured 1980s-like disco vocals and synths. Faze Action released their Body of One LP in 2014. Singles from the LP have included remixes by Phil Mison, Dicky Trisco, Chuggy and Eric Duncan.

As an eight piece live entity, Faze Action have toured extensively with an early stint across North America with Groove Armada in 2000, as a headline act for the Vibes on a Summers Day festival in Australia, Glastonbury, The Big Chill, Benicassim and more. They continue to be in demand DJs having signed to the MN2S agency early in 2015.

In 2018 a career-spanning 'best of' was released under the title Faze Action Presents - Disco Excursions Vol. 1, and, as of 2024, the Lee brothers were still issuing new material.
