= Don't Cry for Me =

Single by Lisa Stansfield

from the album Lisa Stansfield
- Released: 17 November 1997
- Recorded: 1997
- Genre: Pop
- Length: 5:03
- Label: Arista
- Songwriters: Lisa Stansfield; Ian Devaney; Cory Rooney; Mark Morales
- Producers: Ian Devaney; Cory Rooney; Mark Morales; Peter Mokran

Lisa Stansfield singles chronology
"Never Gonna Fall" (1997)	"Don't Cry for Me" (1997)	"I'm Leavin'" (1998)

Music video
- "Don't Cry for Me" on YouTube

"Don't Cry for Me" is a song recorded by British singer, songwriter and actress Lisa Stansfield for her 1997 eponymous album. It was written by Stansfield, Ian Devaney, Cory Rooney and Mark Morales. Originally, the track was produced by Devaney, Rooney and Morales, and further production was handled by Peter Mokran and Devaney.

Cory Rooney co-wrote and co-produced many of Jennifer Lopez's hits, including "If You Had My Love." "Don't Cry for Me" received positive reviews from music critics. Arista Records created CD singles and a music video directed by Ben Unwin, and set the European release date for 17 November 1997. However, the single was withdrawn at the last minute. It included two previously unreleased tracks: "You Get Me" and "Breathtaking." These songs were later featured as bonus tracks on the 2003 remastered editions of Stansfield's albums: "You Get Me" on Face Up and "Breathtaking" on Lisa Stansfield. Both songs were also included on the 2014 deluxe 2CD + DVD re-release of Lisa Stansfield (and also on The Collection 1989–2003).

Despite the withdrawn single, "Don't Cry for Me" was played on radio in Europe in December 1997.

== Critical reception ==
Dominic Pride from Music & Media described "Don't Cry for Me" as a "building ballad". A reviewer from Music Week gave it three out of five, declaring it as "[a] gently-flowing, piano-led ballad on which her seductively beautiful voice is unquestionably the star." Press of Atlantic City stated that the singer "shines" on the "sultry ballad".

== Track listings ==
- European CD single
1. "Don't Cry for Me" (Edit) – 4:18
2. "You Get Me" – 5:36
- European CD maxi-single #1
1. "Don't Cry for Me" (Edit) – 4:18
2. "You Get Me" – 5:36
3. "Breathtaking" – 4:49
- UK CD maxi-single #2
1. "Don't Cry for Me" (Edit) – 4:18
2. "All Woman" – 5:18
3. "So Natural" – 5:06
