= Hall Mead School =

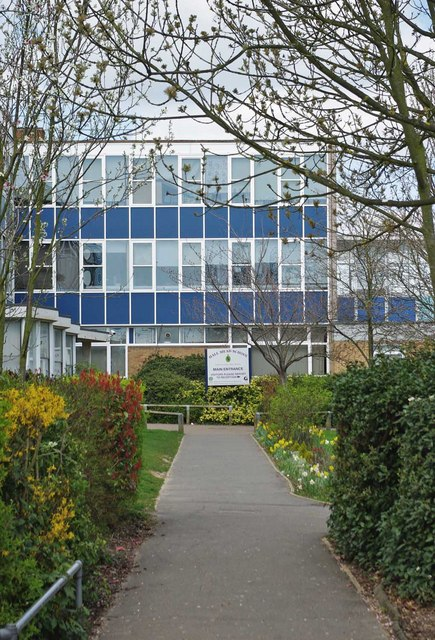
- The entrance to the school in 2010

Location
- Marlborough Gardens; Upminster, Greater London, RM14 1SF; England; 51.5642°N 0.2621°E

Information
- Type: Academy
- Motto: Family for life
- Established: 1960
- Founder: J. McKernan
- Department for Education URN: 137197 Tables
- Ofsted: Reports
- Headteacher: Maria Ducker
- Gender: Mixed
- Age: 11 to 16
- Enrolment: 1,017
- Houses: Talbot, Waltham, Chapman, Dickens
- Colours: Red, Yellow, Blue, Green
- Website: http://www.hallmeadschool.co.uk/

Hall Mead School is a coeducational secondary school with academy status, located in the Cranham area of the London Borough of Havering, England.

== General Information ==
Hall Mead School is designated as a Leading Edge Specialist Academy in Technology and Languages by the Department for Education. It is also the lead school in a teacher training consortium.

== History ==
Hall Mead School was opened in 1960 as Hall Mead county secondary school. It was originally a secondary modern school for those who were not selected to go to grammar school by the eleven-plus examination. It is now a comprehensive school. Well-equipped, it was one of the first schools to acquire a swimming pool, largely by the fundraising efforts of the pupils and their families. Hall Mead School does not have a swimming pool today.

Hall Mead School converted to academy status in 2011.

Simon London was headteacher for fifteen years; he stepped down from the role in July 2023.

In 2013, it was the only school in Havering to receive an 'Outstanding' report from Ofsted for achievement of pupils, quality of teaching, behaviour & safety of pupils, and leadership & management. Nearby schools such as Coopers' Company and Coborn School and Gaynes School got a 'Good' report.

By 2018, the old building, which dated back to the 1960s, desperately needed to be replaced. Headteacher Simon London stated, "It wasn't fit for purpose, narrow corridors, sweltering hot in the summer, freezing cold in the winter and windows didn't all open. We only had one hall that was also a dining room and also a drama room," he added.

In 2018, a bid for funding for a new school building was granted by the Department of Education. It was built with modern aspects designed to innovate the learning experiences of pupils. It was completed in September 2021, three years after work began.

In September 2023, Maria Ducker took the position of headteacher; she had worked at Hall Mead School for eight years and was previously a deputy headteacher.

In 2023, 10 years after the last Ofsted inspection, the school received an 'Outstanding' report in all categories: quality of education, behaviour and attitudes, personal development, and learning and management.

== Notable former pupils ==
- Frankie Sandford, singer for S Club 8 and The Saturdays, runner-up on Strictly Come Dancing in 2013
- Harlee Dean, footballer for Reading F.C.
- Carly Hillman, actress and stage performer, who was in EastEnders
- James Smith, Britain's Got Talent (series 8) finalist
- Amy Marren, Paralympian
- Paul Sculfor, model
- Phil Misonm DJ
- Max Watters, footballer
- Matt Cox, bassist and backing vocals for The Raven Age
