= Walters Room =

Studio album by Black Science Orchestra
- Released: 1996
- Studio: Chrysalis Studios
- Genre: Electronic
- Length: 58:41
- Label: Junior Boy's Own
- Producer: Ashley Beedle, Black Science Orchestra, Tommy D

Professional ratings
Review scores
| Source | Rating |
|---|---|
| AllMusic | 4.5/5 stars |
| Muzik | 4.5/5 stars |

Walters Room is a studio album by Black Science Orchestra, released on Junior Boy's Own in 1996. The title is a reference to Walter Gibbons. It debuted at number 68 on the UK Albums Chart. In 2008, it was re-released with additional bonus tracks.

== Track listing ==
| No. | Title | Writer(s) | Length |
|---|---|---|---|
| 1. | "Start the Dancer" | Beedle, Woolford, Classen | 3:55 |
| 2. | "City of Brotherly Love" | Beedle, Woolford, Classen | 6:53 |
| 3. | "A Hot Family Day" | Beedle, Woolford | 4:03 |
| 4. | "Bless the Darkness" | Beedle, Woolford | 6:54 |
| 5. | "Just Holdin' On" | Beedle, Woolford, Classen | 3:35 |
| 6. | "Hudson River Revisited" | Beedle, Woolford, Classen | 3:07 |
| 7. | "St. Mark's Square" | Beedle, Woolford | 6:11 |
| 8. | "Save Us (The Jam)" | Beedle, Woolford, Classen, Tommy D | 8:17 |
| 9. | "Downtown Science" | Beedle, Woolford | 6:26 |
| 10. | "Rican Opus #9" | Beedle, Woolford | 5:19 |
| 11. | "Hudson River High" | Beedle, Woolford, Classen | 3:56 |

== Personnel ==
- Ashley Beedle – percussion, keyboards, drum programming, vocals
- Marc Woolford – keyboards, programming, vocals
- Uschi Classen – keyboards, string arrangement, vocals
- Amy Simmons – flute
- David Alvarez – drums
- Dave Maggio – saxophone
- Lewis Rhone – trombone
- Charles Marin – trumpet
- Stella Hinton – guitar
- Tommy D – keyboards, vocals
- Oscar Ronindéz – percussion
- Carl Walker – vibraphone
- The Classenic String Ensemble – strings
- Steve Lucas – vocals
- Carla Hendry – vocals
- Sister Soul – vocals

== Charts ==
| Chart | Peak position |
|---|---|
| UK Albums (OCC) | 68 |
