= Future Juju =

Album by Black Jazz Chronicles

Studio album by Black Jazz Chronicles
- Released: 1998
- Label: Nuphonic

Professional ratings
Review scores
Source	Rating
AllMusic	4.5/5 stars
The Times	7/10

Future Juju is an album by the British house act Black Jazz Chronicles, released in 1998.

== Critical reception ==
The Times deemed the album "an hour of beautifully crafted, intense, atmospheric music", but noted that "over the length of the album, the subtle moods struggle to sustain the listener's optimum interest".

AllMusic called the album "a fusion of Afrocentric jazz textures and tribal-disco rhythms with science-fiction mythology gained from equal parts Sun Ra and Juan Atkins".

== Track listing ==
1. "Up and Down"
2. "If The Creator Came Today"
3. "Ancient Future"
4. "Sun of my Sons"
5. "Dope Stuff"
6. "Snooky's Spirit"
7. "Future Juju"
8. "Alien Waters"
9. "The World Will Rock"
10. "New Orleans"
11. "All Allah"
12. "One Bad Morning"
13. "Promises and Lies"
