= The Only Way =

The Only Way may refer to:

- The Only Way, a 1927 British film by Herbert Wilcox
- The Only Way, a 1970 American film by Bent Christensen
- The Only Way, a 2004 American film by David Zimmerman III and Levi Steven Obery
- The Only Way, a 1901 book by Leo Tolstoy
- "The Only Way", a 1982 song by Lisa Stansfield
- The Only Way, a 2024 Vietnamese TV series
- "The Only Way", a 1971 song by Emerson, Lake & Palmer from the album Tarkus
- "The Only Way", a 2006 song by Gotye from the album Like Drawing Blood
- "The Only Way", a 1996 song by Yolanda Adams from the album Yolanda... Live in Washington
