= Listen to Your Heart (Lisa Stansfield song) =

Single by Lisa Stansfield
- Released: 1983
- Recorded: 1983
- Genre: New wave; pop
- Length: 3:19
- Label: Devil; Polydor
- Songwriters: David Pickerill; Paul O'Donoughue
- Producer: David Pickerill

Lisa Stansfield singles chronology
"The Only Way" (1982)	"Listen to Your Heart" (1983)	"I Got a Feeling" (1983)

"Listen to Your Heart" is a song recorded by British singer Lisa Stansfield. It was written by David Pickerill and Paul O'Donoughue, and produced by Pickerill. "Listen to Your Heart" was released as a single by the Devil Records/Polydor in the United Kingdom in 1983. The single's B-side is "The Thought Police" which also appeared on Stansfield's first single, "Your Alibis". "Listen to Your Heart" was released on the In Session album in 1996.

== Track listing ==
UK 7" single

1. "Listen to Your Heart" – 3:19
2. "The Thought Police" – 3:15
