= Money Talks (soundtrack) =

Soundtrack album by Various artists
- Released: August 12, 1997
- Recorded: 1996–1997
- Genre: Hip hop; R&B
- Length: 1:04:26
- Label: Arista
- Producer: Brett Ratner (exec.); Chris Tucker (exec.); Clive Davis (exec.); Andre Evans; Barry White; Clanz; Daniel LeMelle; David Gamson; Deric "D-Dot" Angelettie; Grand Puba; Ian Devaney; Jermaine Dupri; KayGee; Nashiem Myrick; Organized Noize; Pras; Rick James; Rodney Jerkins; Russell Elevado; Sean "Puffy" Combs; Stevie J; Timbaland

Singles from Money Talks
- 1. "Feel So Good" Released: October 14, 1997; 2. "Avenues" Released: 1997; 3. "The Real Thing" Released: 10 March 1997; 4. "Things Just Ain't the Same" Released: June 3, 1997; 5. "A Dream" Released: August 1998; 6. "Everyday" Released: 2000

Professional ratings
Review scores
Source	Rating
AllMusic	2.5/5 stars

Money Talks: The Album is the soundtrack to Brett Ratner's 1997 comedy film Money Talks. It was released on August 12, 1997 through Arista Records and features hip hop and R&B music. The album peaked at No. 37 on the Billboard 200 and No. 6 on the Top R&B/Hip-Hop Albums chart, and was certified gold by the RIAA on December 19, 1997.

== Track listing ==
No.	Title	Writer(s)	Producer(s)	Length
1.	"Avenues" (performed by Refugee Camp All-Stars featuring Pras with Ky-Mani)	Eddy Grant	Pras; Wyclef Jean (co.); Jerry Duplessis (co.)	4:18
2.	"My Everything" (performed by Barry White & Faith Evans)	Barry White; Steven Jordan; Faith Evans; Carl Thomas	Stevie J	4:11
3.	"No Way Out" (performed by Puff Daddy featuring Black Rob)	Deric Angelettie; Mason Betha; Nashiem Myrick; Sean Combs; Nickolas Ashford; Valerie Simpson	Nashiem Myrick; Sean "Puffy" Combs	3:43
4.	"A Dream" (performed by Mary J. Blige)	Bunny DeBarge	Rodney Jerkins	5:02
5.	"Money Talks" (performed by Lil' Kim featuring Andrea Martin)	Timothy Mosley; Kimberly Jones; Andrea Martin; Ivan Matias	Timbaland	5:06
6.	"Penetration" (performed by Next & Naughty by Nature)	Keir Gist; Anthony Criss; Darren Lighty; Clifton Lighty; Delvis Damon; Kevin Morse; Bobby Robinson	KayGee; Darren Lighty	4:34
7.	"Tell Me How You Want It" (performed by SWV)	Kevin Miller; Mark Mueller; Robbie Nevil	Organized Noize; Clanz	4:54
8.	"Everyday" (performed by Angie Stone & Devox)	Angie Stone; D'Angelo	Russ Elevado; Gerry DeVeaux (add.)	3:30
9.	"Keep It Bubblin'" (performed by Brand Nubian)	Lorenzo DeChalus; Derek Murphy; Maxwell Dixon	Grand Puba; Lord Jamar	4:43
10.	"The Teaching" (performed by Me'Shell NdegéOcello)	Me'Shell NdegéOcello	David Gamson; Meshell Ndegeocello (co.)	3:48
11.	"Feel So Good" (performed by Ma$e)	Betha; Angelettie; Combs; Lawrence Dermer; Joe Galdo; Rafael Vigil	Deric "D-Dot" Angelettie; Sean "Puffy" Combs	4:01
12.	"Things Just Ain't the Same" (performed by Deborah Cox)	Nicole Renée; Alfred Antoine; Andre Evans	Bob Antoine; Andre Evans	3:38
13.	"Back in You Again" (performed by Rick James featuring Lil' Cease)	Rick James	Rick James; Danny LeMelle; Jermaine Dupri (add.)	4:06
14.	"The Real Thing" (performed by Lisa Stansfield)	Lisa Stansfield; Ian Devaney	Ian Devaney; Peter Mokran (co.)	4:19
15.	"You're the First, the Last, My Everything" (performed by Barry White)	Barry White; Peter Sterling Radcliffe; Tony Sepe	Barry White	4:33
Total length:				1:04:26

Note: "If You Want Me to Stay" by Sly and the Family Stone was featured in the movie but was not included on the soundtrack.

Sample credits

- "My Everything" contains elements from "You're the First, the Last, My Everything", written by Barry White, Peter Sterling Radcliffe, and Tony Sepe.
- "Money Talks" contains re-recorded portions of "Seasons in the Sun", written by Jacques Brel and Rod McKuen.
- "Penetration" contains:
  - replayed elements from "I Want to Be in the Land of Milk & Honey", written by James Brown, Vicki Anderson, and David Matthews.
  - re-sung elements from "Funky Boy Party", written by Bobby Robinson.
- "Keep It Bubblin'" contains a sample of "Heart of Stone", written by Sylvester Levay and Stephan Prager, performed by Silver Convention.
- "Feel So Good" contains a sample of "Hollywood Swinging"; written by Robert Earl Bell, Ronald Bell, George Brown, Robert Mickens, Claydes Smith, Dennis Thomas, and Richard Westfield; performed by Kool & the Gang.
- "Things Just Ain't the Same" contains a sample of "You Are Everything", written by Thomas Bell and Linda Creed, performed by the Stylistics.

== Charts ==
=== Weekly charts ===
Chart (1997)	Peak position
Swedish Albums (Sverigetopplistan)	39
US Billboard 200	37
US Top R&B/Hip-Hop Albums (Billboard)	6

=== Year-end charts ===
Chart (1997)	Position
US Top R&B/Hip-Hop Albums (Billboard)	94

== Certifications ==
Region	Certification	Certified units/sales
United States (RIAA)	Gold	500,000^{^}
^{^} Shipments figures based on certification alone.
