= I Got a Feeling (Four Tops song) =

"I Got a Feeling" is a song recorded by American Motown vocal group Four Tops for their 1966 album, On Top. It was written by Holland–Dozier–Holland and produced by Brian Holland and Lamont Dozier. In 1967, "I Got a Feeling" was covered by Barbara Randolph. This version was produced by Hal Davis and released as a single in 1967.

== Lisa Stansfield version ==
"I Got a Feeling"

Single by Lisa Stansfield
- Released: 1983
- Recorded: 1983
- Genre: New wave; pop; soul
- Length: 3:00
- Label: Devil; Polydor
- Songwriter: Holland–Dozier–Holland
- Producer: David Pickerill

Lisa Stansfield singles chronology
"Listen to Your Heart" (1983)	"I Got a Feeling" (1983)	"People Hold On" (1989)

British singer Lisa Stansfield covered "I Got a Feeling" in 1983 and released it as a single in the United Kingdom. Her version was produced by David Pickerill. The single's B-side includes "Red Lights", another song recorded by Stansfield. "I Got a Feeling" was never included on any of Stansfield's albums but "Red Lights" was featured on the In Session compilation in 1996.

=== Track listing ===
UK 7" single

1. "I Got a Feeling"
2. "Red Lights"
