= In Session (Lisa Stansfield album) =

1996 compilation album by Lisa Stansfield

Compilation album by Lisa Stansfield
- Released: 20 September 1996
- Recorded: 1981–1983
- Genre: Pop; R&B
- Length: 49:28
- Label: Sovereign Music
- Producer: David Pickerill

Lisa Stansfield chronology
So Natural (1993)	In Session (1996)	Lisa Stansfield (1997)

In Session is a compilation album containing Lisa Stansfield's early recordings from 1981 to 1983. It was released by Sovereign Music on 20 September 1996.

== Content ==
The album contains fourteen songs written by David Pickerill and Paul O'Donoughue, and produced by Pickerill, including Stansfield's first three singles: "Your Alibis" (retitled here as "Alibi's"), "The Only Way" and "Listen to Your Heart", and their B-sides: "The Thought Police" and "Only Love", retitled "Only Love (Can Break Your Heart)". In Session does not include Stansfield's fourth single "I Got a Feeling", but includes its B-side "Red Lights" (track 10).

== Track listing ==
No.	Title	Writer(s)	Producer(s)	Length
1.	"The Only Way"	David Pickerill, Paul O'Donoughue	Pickerill	3:25
2.	"Bitter Sweet"	Pickerill, O'Donoughue	Pickerill	4:33
3.	"The Thought Police"	Pickerill, O'Donoughue	Pickerill	3:31
4.	"Walking on Thin Ice"	Pickerill, O'Donoughue	Pickerill	3:05
5.	"Listen to Your Heart"	Pickerill, O'Donoughue	Pickerill	3:13
6.	"Only Love (Can Break Your Heart)"	Pickerill, O'Donoughue	Pickerill	3:05
7.	"More than Love"	Pickerill, O'Donoughue	Pickerill	4:42
8.	"Don't Stop Me for the Mailman"	Pickerill, O'Donoughue	Pickerill	3:02
9.	"A Boy You Have Known"	Pickerill, O'Donoughue	Pickerill	2:56
10.	"Red Lights"	Pickerill, O'Donoughue	Pickerill	3:18
11.	"Make Sure That the Feelin's Right"	Pickerill	Pickerill	4:00
12.	"Spinning Top"	Pickerill, O'Donoughue	Pickerill	3:21
13.	"Take Care, Goodnight"	Pickerill, O'Donoughue	Pickerill	3:09
14.	"Alibi's"	Pickerill, O'Donoughue	Pickerill	4:08

== Release history ==
Region	Date	Label	Format	Catalog
United Kingdom	20 September 1996	Sovereign Music	CD	SOV016CD
