= Stone Gon' =

Studio album by Barry White
- Released: October 2, 1973
- Genre: R&B, soul, disco
- Length: 37:49
- Label: 20th Century
- Producer: Barry White

Barry White chronology
I've Got So Much to Give (1973)	Stone Gon' (1973)	Can't Get Enough (1974)

Singles from Stone Gon'
- 1. "Never, Never Gonna Give Ya Up" Released: October 1973; 2. "Honey Please, Can't Ya See" Released: February 1974

Professional ratings
Review scores
Source	Rating
AllMusic	4.5/5 stars
Christgau's Record Guide	C−
Rolling Stone	Mixed

Stone Gon' is the second studio album by American R&B singer Barry White, released in 1973 on 20th Century Records. The album was arranged by Barry White and Gene Page.

== History ==
The album topped the R&B albums chart, his second to do so. It also reached number 20 on the Billboard 200 and number 18 on the UK Albums Chart. The album was a success, yielding two Billboard R&B Top Ten singles, "Never, Never Gonna Give Ya Up" and "Honey Please, Can't Ya See". Both were also successful on the Billboard Hot 100, peaking at numbers 7 and 44 respectively. "Never, Never Gonna Give Ya Up" was also a hit on the UK Singles Chart, peaking at number 14. The album was digitally remastered and reissued on CD on May 3, 1994, by Island/Mercury Records.

== Track listing ==
All tracks are written by Barry White.

Side one
No.	Title	Length
1.	"Girl It's True, Yes I'll Always Love You"	8:36
2.	"Honey Please, Can't Ya See"	5:11
3.	"You're My Baby"	9:08

Side two
No.	Title	Length
1.	"Hard to Believe That I Found You"	6:59
2.	"Never, Never Gonna Give Ya Up"	7:56

== Personnel ==
- Barry White – lead vocals, arranger
- Gene Page – arranger

Technical

- Frank Kejmar – engineer
- Craig Braun – design
- Norman Seeff – photography

== Charts ==
Chart performance for Stone Gon'
Chart (1973–1974)	Peak position
Australian Albums (Kent Music Report)	9
UK Albums Chart	18
US Billboard Top LPs	20
US Billboard Top Soul LPs	1

== Certifications ==
Certifications for Stone Gon'
Region	Certification	Certified units/sales
United Kingdom (BPI)	Gold	100,000^{^}
United States (RIAA)	Gold	500,000^{^}
^{^} Shipments figures based on certification alone.

== See also ==
- List of Billboard number-one R&B albums of 1974
