= Never, Never Gonna Give Ya Up =

Song written, produced and recorded by Barry White

- Side-A label of one of the US vinyl releases

Single by Barry White

from the album Stone Gon'
- B-side: "Never, Never Gonna Give Ya Up" (long version); "Honey Please, Can't Ya See"; "Standing in the Shadows of Love"; "I've Found Someone"; "No, I'm Never Gonna Give Ya Up"
- Released: October 1973
- Genre: Soul
- Length: 7:58 (album version); 4:01 (single version); 4:51 (alternate edit)
- Label: 20th Century
- Songwriter: Barry White
- Producer: Barry White

Barry White singles chronology
"I've Got So Much to Give" (1973)	"Never, Never Gonna Give Ya Up" (1973)	"Love's Theme" (1973)

Music video
- "Never, Never Gonna Give Ya Up" (TopPop, 1974) on YouTube

"Never, Never Gonna Give Ya Up" is a song written, produced and recorded by American singer and songwriter Barry White for his second album, Stone Gon' (1973). In October 1973, it was released as the first single in the United States and reached number two on the Hot R&B/Hip-Hop Songs and number seven on the Billboard Hot 100. It became a gold record. In Europe, it was issued in early 1974 and peaked at number 14 on the UK Singles Chart.

== Track listings ==
- Australian 7" single
1. "Never, Never Gonna Give Ya Up" – 3:58
2. "I've Found Someone" – 5:55
- European 7" single
1. "Never, Never Gonna Give Ya Up" – 3:58
2. "Honey Please, Can't Ya See" – 2:54
- UK 7" single
1. "Never, Never Gonna Give Ya Up" – 3:05
2. "Standing in the Shadows of Love" – 3:00
- North American 7" (original) single
1. "Never, Never Gonna Give Ya Up" (short version) – 3:05
2. "Never, Never Gonna Give Ya Up" (long version) - 4:44
- North American 7" (re-release) single
1. "Never, Never Gonna Give Ya Up" – 3:05
2. "No, I'm Never Gonna Give Ya Up" (Instrumental) - 4:24

== Charts ==
Weekly chart performance for "Never, Never Gonna Give Ya Up"
Chart (1973–1974)	Peak position
Australia (Kent Music Report)	8
Belgium (Ultratop 50 Flanders)	10
Belgium (Ultratop 50 Wallonia)	24
Canada Top Singles (RPM)	36
Netherlands (Dutch Top 40)	9
Netherlands (Single Top 100)	9
UK Singles (Official Charts)	14
US Billboard Hot 100	7
US Adult Contemporary (Billboard)	40
US Hot R&B/Hip-Hop Songs (Billboard)	2

=== Year-end charts ===
Year-end chart performance for "Never, Never Gonna Give Ya Up"
Chart (1974)	Rank
Australia (Kent Music Report)	67

== 1987 remix ==
In 1987, Paul Hardcastle remixed the track. It was issued (with the slightly amended spelling of "Never, Never Going to Give You Up") in several European countries on 7" and 12" singles. Released to coincide with the compilation album Barry White – The Collection, it reached number 63 on the UK singles chart in January 1988.

- UK 7" single
1. "Never, Never Gonna Give You Up" – 4:15
2. "September When I First Met You" – 6:50
- UK 12" single
1. "Never, Never Gonna Give You Up (Mammoth Mix)" – 7:17
2. "Never, Never Gonna Give You Up (Extended Version)" – 5:42
3. "September When I First Met You" – 6:50

== Lisa Stansfield version ==
"Never, Never Gonna Give You Up"
- UK/European studio CD release

Single by Lisa Stansfield

from the album Lisa Stansfield
- Released: June 9, 1997
- Recorded: 1997
- Genre: R&B; soul; pop
- Length: 5:02
- Label: Arista
- Songwriter: Barry White
- Producers: Ian Devaney; Peter Mokran

Lisa Stansfield singles chronology
"The Real Thing" (1997)	"Never, Never Gonna Give You Up" (1997)	"The Line" (1997)

Music video
- "Never, Never Gonna Give You Up" on YouTube

In 1997, the English singer, songwriter and actress Lisa Stansfield covered "Never, Never Gonna Give You Up" for her eponymous album. The song was released as the second single from Lisa Stansfield in Europe, Australia and Japan on June 9, 1997, and first proper single in North America on July 21, 1997.

An accompanying music video, directed by Rocky Schenck, was also released. The song was remixed by prominent US producers: Frankie Knuckles, Mark Picchiotti, Hani, Steven Nikolas and Brendon Sibley. In February 1998, Knuckles won the Grammy Award for Best Remixed Recording, Non-Classical at the 40th Annual Grammy Awards. "Never, Never Gonna Give You Up" reached number twenty-five on the UK Singles Chart and seventy-four on the Billboard Hot 100. It also peaked at number-one the Hot Dance Club Songs chart in October 1997 and number thirty-eight on the Hot R&B/Hip-Hop Songs chart. The song was later included on The Remix Album (1998) and Biography: The Greatest Hits (2003).

In 2014, remixes of "Never, Never Gonna Give You Up" were included on the deluxe 2CD + DVD re-release of Lisa Stansfield. Additional remixes were featured on People Hold On ... The Remix Anthology (2014), including three previously unreleased: Frankie's Classic Club Mix, Franktified Off the Hook Dub and After Hours Mix. All were included on The Collection 1989–2003.

=== Critical reception ===
The song received favorable reviews from music critics. Barry Walters for The Advocate said that "the Barry White classic gets remade by the woman who launched her solo career paraphrasing his been-around-the-world pillow talk." Stephen Thomas Erlewine from AllMusic viewed it as "uniformly strong", adding that Stansfield's voice "is seductive and sexy". Larry Flick from Billboard described it as "a sultry rendition" and added that the singer is "breathing enough stylistic variation into the lyrics (...) maintaining a reverence that will sit well with fans of the original recording." He noted that Stansfield "is supported by a rumbling funk groove that is underlined by hip hop-savvy turntable scratches and iced with caressing disco strings." British magazine Music Week rated it three out of five, declaring it as a "convincingly faithful interpretation". William Stevenson from Entertainment Weekly opined that Stansfield "sings with an irresistible urgency, seductively wrapping her silky voice around each phrase while building in intensity. She's never sounded better." A reviewer from Irish Independent picked the song as one of the "moments" of the album, calling it "a sultry slink through" the Barry White song. Press of Atlantic City stated that Stansfield "shines" on the "energetic remake". USA Today described it as an "up-tempo dance groove".

=== Commercial reception ===
The song topped the US Dance Club Songs. It also reached number 25 in the United Kingdom and peaked at number 74 in the United States, Canada and Germany.

=== Track listings ===
- European CD single
1. "Never, Never Gonna Give You Up" (Radio Mix) – 4:26
2. "Change" (Live) – 5:19
- Australian/European/Japanese CD maxi-single
1. "Never, Never Gonna Give You Up" (Radio Mix) – 4:26
2. "Never, Never Gonna Give You Up" (Album Edit) – 4:04
3. "Never, Never Gonna Give You Up" (Touch 2 Mix) – 5:34
4. "Never, Never Gonna Give You Up" (Frankie Knuckles Hard & Sexy Radio) – 4:15
5. "Never, Never Gonna Give You Up" (Mark!'s Transparent Vocal) – 9:54
- European CD maxi-single #2
1. "Never, Never Gonna Give You Up" (Live) – 5:15
2. "Suzanne" (Live) – 4:38
3. "People Hold On" (Live) – 3:47
4. "Change" (Live) – 5:19
- European 12" single
1. "Never, Never Gonna Give You Up" (Mark!'s Transparent Vocal) – 9:54
2. "Never, Never Gonna Give You Up" (Radio Mix) – 4:26
3. "Never, Never Gonna Give You Up" (Frankie Knuckles Hard & Sexy Radio) – 4:15
4. "Never, Never Gonna Give You Up" (Touch 2 Mix) – 5:34
- UK 12" single
1. "Never, Never Gonna Give You Up" (Main Mix) – 5:02
2. "Never, Never Gonna Give You Up" (Frankie's Hard & Sexy Radio) – 4:15
3. "Never, Never Gonna Give You Up" (Mark!'s Transparent Vocal) – 9:54
- UK promotional 12" single
1. "Never, Never Gonna Give You Up" (Frankie's Hard R&B Club) – 6:54
2. "Never, Never Gonna Give You Up" (Frankie's Hard & Sexy Radio) – 4:13
- UK promotional 12" single
1. "Never, Never Gonna Give You Up" (Mark!'s Transparent Vocal) – 9:54
2. "Never, Never Gonna Give You Up" (Mark!'s Shelter Dub) – 10:57
- UK promotional 12" single
1. "Never, Never Gonna Give You Up" (Main Mix) – 5:02
2. "Never, Never Gonna Give You Up" (Touch 2 Mix) – 5:34
3. "Never, Never Gonna Give You Up" (77th Heaven Mix) – 7:10
4. "Never, Never Gonna Give You Up" (Radio Mix) – 4:26
- US CD single
1. "Never, Never Gonna Give You Up" – 4:45
2. "People Hold On" (DRS Mix) – 3:42
- US promotional CD single
1. "Never, Never Gonna Give You Up" (Radio Edit) – 4:10
2. "Never, Never Gonna Give You Up" (Album Version) – 4:45
- US promotional 12" single
1. "Never, Never Gonna Give You Up" (Album Mix) – 4:40
2. "Never, Never Gonna Give You Up" (Groove Mix) – 5:01
3. "Never, Never Gonna Give You Up" (Frankie's Hard & Sexy Mix) – 4:13
4. "Never, Never Gonna Give You Up" (Frankie's Hard R&B Club Mix) – 6:54
- US promotional 2x12" single
1. "Never, Never Gonna Give You Up" (Hani Num Club Mix) – 9:03
2. "Never, Never Gonna Give You Up" (Mark Picchiotti Dub) – 8:18
3. "Never, Never Gonna Give You Up" (Nikolas & Sibley Club Mix) – 8:36
4. "Never, Never Gonna Give You Up" (Frankie's Classic Morning Mix) – 8:46
5. "Never, Never Gonna Give You Up" (Mark Picchiotti Club Mix) – 9:55
6. "Never, Never Gonna Give You Up" (Hani's Vocal Reprise) – 1:56
7. "Never, Never Gonna Give You Up" (Hani's Bonus Beats) – 2:03
8. "Never, Never Gonna Give You Up" (Hani's Analog Bubble Bath) – 8:30
9. "Never, Never Gonna Give You Up" (Nikolas & Sibley Dub) – 5:23
- Other remixes
1. "Never, Never Gonna Give You Up" (Hani Mix) – 8:54
2. "Never, Never Gonna Give You Up" (Frankie Knuckles Mix) – 8:42
3. "Never, Never Gonna Give You Up" (Frankie's Classic Club Mix) – 8:15
4. "Never, Never Gonna Give You Up" (Franktified Off the Hook Dub) – 7:14
5. "Never, Never Gonna Give You Up" (After Hours Mix) – 7:10

=== Charts ===
Chart performance for "Never, Never Gonna Give You Up"
Chart (1997)	Peak position
Australia (ARIA)	182
Belgium (Ultratip Bubbling Under Flanders)	5
Canada Top Singles (RPM)	74
Europe (European Hot 100 Singles)	99
Europe Radio Top 50 (Music & Media)	8
Germany (GfK)	74
Hungary Airplay (Music & Media)	9
Italy Airplay (Music & Media)	7
Poland Airplay (Music & Media)	1
Scottish Singles Sales (Official Charts)	35
Spain Airplay (Music & Media)	3
UK Singles (Official Charts)	25
UK Hip Hop/R&B (Official Charts)	4
US Billboard Hot 100	74
US Dance Club Songs (Billboard)	1
US Hot R&B/Hip-Hop Songs (Billboard)	38

== See also ==
- List of number-one dance singles of 1997 (U.S.)
