= Nuphonic =

Independent record label

- Founded: 1994–2002
- Founder: Sav Remzi; David Hill
- Status: defunct
- Genre: Nu House; House; Electronic
- Country of origin: United Kingdom
- Location: London, England
- Official website: www.nuphonic.com

Nuphonic was an independent record label, based in London, from 1994 to 2002.

== History ==
Nuphonic was founded in 1994 by Sav Remzi and David Hill. It released its first record in June 1995, Faze Action's "Original Disco Motion", which was soon followed by the cello-led disco track "In The Trees".

Tom Hingston contributed a number of sleeve designs.

The company ceased trading in 2002 and all rights were returned to the artists who recorded music for the label.

In 2004 Remzi launched a new record label, Tirk Records. David Hill formed a music supervision and composition company, called Radial Music, in 2006.

== Notable artists ==
- Black Jazz Chronicles
- Faze Action
- Fug
- Norman Jay
- Andrew Weatherall
