= Your Alibis =

Single by Lisa Stansfield
- Released: 1981
- Recorded: 1981
- Studio: Pennine Studios, Oldham
- Genre: New wave; pop
- Length: 4:07
- Label: Devil; Dureco
- Songwriters: David Pickerill; Paul O'Donoughue
- Producers: David Pickerill; Paul O'Donoughue

Lisa Stansfield singles chronology
"Your Alibis" (1981)	"The Only Way" (1982)

"Your Alibis" is the debut single by the then fifteen-year-old Lisa Stansfield. The song was written and produced by David Pickerill and Paul O'Donoughue. It was released by Devil Records in the United Kingdom in 1981. It was also issued by Dureco Benelux in the Netherlands in 1982. The single and its B-side, "The Thought Police", were both included on the 1996 compilation In Session. "The Thought Police" was also recorded by the Editors, who released it as a single on Devil Records in 1981.

== Track listing ==
1. "Your Alibis" – 4:07
2. "The Thought Police" – 3:15
