= Hani (producer) =

- Born: Hani Adnan Al-Bader
- Origin: New York City
- Genres: House, dance
- Occupations: Producer, remixer
- Years active: 1993–present
- Label: Soterios Records

Hani (born Hani Adnan Al-Bader) is a Kuwaiti / American record producer and remixer based in New York, notable for his restructurings of hits by artists ranging from Michael Jackson to Alicia Keys, as well as his original productions. His 1999 release, "Baby Wants to Ride", reached number 1 on the US Billboard Hot Dance Music/Club Play chart. His work has led to a collaboration with DJ Frankie Knuckles, as well as vocalists Jason Walker, Andrea Martin, Faith Trent, and others.

== History ==
In 1984 Hani back home in Kuwait was a bedroom DJ recording mixed cassette tapes. By 1988 during his college years in Denver Hani became a professional DJ at several major clubs. Saved enough money to purchase used Synthesizers, Drum Machines and 4 track tape from pawn shops. Hani learned on his own the art of making Electronic Dance Music and was able to release few underground records. In 1993 Hani got his start doing underground Acid House tracks for Carl Craig's Label Planet-e & Deep Dish's label Yoshitoshi. Soon after Hani decided to go to New York to study audio engineering.

By 1994 Hani was enrolled in the Institute of Audio Research in New York City. There he gained knowledge of the fundamentals of audio acoustics, electronic circuitry, engineering and mixing. While attending the institute Hani applied at Bass Hit Studios for an intern job. It was at Bass Hit Studios that Hani acquired a deeper sense of Electronic Dance Music by working for such House music luminaries as Masters at Work (Little Louie Vega & Kenny Dope), Roger Sanchez and Danny Tenaglia. Hani cleaned the studio after them, picked up the garbage and delivered food however, he also learned the basics of House arrangements and mixing. While doing so Hani started his remix career working on projects for Artists such as Deee-Lite, Repercussions & Urban Soul.

The competition in New York City was very high and Hani had to quickly make a name for himself therefore, he did not follow the rules. He did not wait for record labels to give him a chance at remixing songs he liked. He chose songs he gravitated to and went on to produce his remixes in his studio without being commissioned. His 1995 unauthorized remix of Sade's "I Never Thought I'd See the Day" under the alias Musk Men got him the exposure he'd been waiting for. It was bootlegged by several labels in the US and Europe and gave Hani a Jump-start. Sade, however, was not into remixes so never got an official release. Then came Hani's unauthorized remix of Sting's "Sister Moon", which was also bootlegged. Due to its success, this remix got official approval and was released by A&M.

Hani's passion for creating music became a steadfast career in the summer of 1996 with the release of his first No:1 Billboard production "Soul To Bare" with house diva Joi Cardwell. Moreover, Hani went on to produce another international hit "That Look" by Delacy. Both where featured by Pete Tong on BBC Radio 1.

Hani kept on working & releasing several official remixes for various independent dance labels until in 1996 Hani decide to work on an unauthorized remix of Michael Jackson's "Earth Song". Frankie Knuckles played Hani's remix on both radios and in clubs. One afternoon Hani recalls " I got contacted by a big Sony executive to inform me of how much MJ and the label loves the remix and how excited they are to release it worldwide. "Earth Song" went on to become No:1 for six weeks on the UK singles chart. 3 months later Hani got commissioned to remix MJ's "Stranger in Moscow".

One of the great rewards of Hani's newfound recognition was an invitation to collaborate with the Frankie Knuckles on a remix project. "He's one person who impressed me because there's a certain sound in what he does that I think is interesting. I like the touch that he has", Frankie acknowledges.

1997 saw the birth of hit remixes like Jay-Z's "Can't Knock The Hustle" and the unauthorized mix of "Rocket Man" by Elton John. Remix and production offers from major artists and labels started pouring down from all directions, Hani was a very busy man working from his basement studio. His remixes for Amber "One More Night" and Deborah Cox "I Never Knew" were major radio hits on heavy rotation across the US. True to Hani's style, Arista records had no plans for Deborah's song until Hani decided on his own to transform the slow balled/album filler track into a major dance hit. In 1999 Hani decided to remind his early fans of his love for underground club music by producing the hit "Baby Wants To Ride" which went on to become Number 1 on the Billboard Club chart.

Hani's steady attention and effort toward his remix projects had earned him a reputation among the dance music ranks and that year witnessed the creation of such hits as "Drugs Are Bad" Hani vs. South Park, "Share the Love" by Andrea Martin and "Tuva Groove" by Ondar was an Essential tune on Pete Tongs Show.

By the year 2000 success of remixes such as "There You Go" by Pink and "Glorious"Andreas Johnson cemented Hani's position as one of the top remixers in the US. Although he is increasingly well known by record labels with each project, Hani insists on transforming tracks on his initiative.

By 2003, Hani became one of the top electronic music producers. He went on to officially remix some of today's top international artists.

The next year, Hani produced his third track to reach Number 1 on a Billboard chart, "Foolish Mind Games" with vocalist Jason Walker. By 2005 Hani completed and released over 167 remixes.

After ten years of producing & remixing for various labels, Hani decided to start his record label to claim 100% of copyright ownership and publishing. He established Soterios Records in 2006 during a time when downloading music from the Internet caused most major record companies to take a nose-dive in sales.

Soterios features his collaborative efforts with singers such as Grammy Nominated Singer Song Writer Andrea Martin, Roland Clark, Alex Moulton, GRAMMAR, & Virgin Killer. Hani writes, produces & programs almost 100% of his label's releases under names such as Antigen, Disconffect, Jack Shaft, Miles BlackLove, Magnetic Fields Forever, Extra Sauce & Ridikulous Kool. Soterios Records is currently on various online platforms including Beatport, Traxsource, Spotify and iTunes.

== Remixography ==
- Deee-Lite – "Picnic in The Summertime" Elektra 1994
- Deee-Lite – "Say Ahh" Elektra 1994
- Deee-Lite – "Call Me" Elektra 1994
- Repercussions – "Promise Me Nothing" Reprise 1994
- Urban Soul – "Until We Meet Again "King Street 1995
- Technique – "This Old House" King Street 1995
- Sade – "I Never Thought I'd See The Day" White Label 1995
- Sinéad O'Connor – "Thank You" EMI 1995 (Unreleased)
- Sting – "Sister Moon" AM-PM 1995
- Ziggy Marley – "Power To Move Ya" Elektra 1995
- Danny Tenaglia – "Look Ahead" Tribal 1995
- Projection – "Heart & Soul" DMC 1995
- De'Lacy – "Hideaway" DMC 1995
- Ruffneck – "Everybody Be Somebody" MAW 1995
- Kathy Sledge – "Another Day" Narcotic 1995
- Nu Solution – "I Need You" Narcotic 1995
- Michael Jackson – "Earth Song" Epic 1995
- S.O.S. Band – "Borrowed Love" DMC 1995
- Cassio – "I Like You" Easy Street 1995
- Simply Red – "Fairground" DMC 1995
- Prince – "Solo" White 1995
- Pebbles – "Like The Last Time" MCA 1995
- Angela Lewis – "Dream Come True" Groovilicious 1996
- De'Lacy – "That Look" Deconstruction 1996
- The Shangri-Las – "Give Him a Great Big Kiss" Columbia 1996
- Black Saints – "The First Day" Emotive 1996
- Lolita – "Cocaine" Emotive 1996
- Buzz – "Faith in Love" Iron 1996
- Djaimin – "Finally" Slip & Slide 1996
- Jean Michel Jarre – "Oxygene 8" Sony 1996
- Shawn Christopher – "Don't Lose The Magic" DMC 1996
- Mariah Carey – "Looking In" White Label 1996
- Massimo Di Cataldo – "Anim Rou" Sony 1996
- Reel 2 Real – "Muave La Cadera" Positiva 1996
- Elton John – "Rocket Man" MCA 1996
- Hondi – "Hondi No Access" Manifesto 1996
- Jay-Z & Mary J. Blige – "Can't Knock the Hustle" BMG 1996
- Michael Jackson – "Stranger In Moscow" Epic 1997
- Acacia – "Maddening Shroud" WEA 1997
- Skunk Anansie – "Brazen" One little Indian 1997
- Myndy K – "Love From Above" Strictly Rhythm 1997
- Amber – "One More Night" Tommy Boy 1997
- Cyndi Lauper – "Sisters of Avalon" Epic 1997 Unreleased
- Savage Garden – "To the Moon and Back" Columbia 1997
- Lisa Stansfield – "Never Never Gonna Give You Up" Arista 1997
- Transglobal Underground – "Eyeway Souljah" MCA 1997
- Crystal Waters – "Momma Told Me" Mercury 1997
- Pink Floyd vs. Underworld – "Brown Acid" White Label 97'
- Todd Terry – "Ready For A New Day" Manifesto 1997
- Brainbug – "Rain" Groovilicious 98'
- War of the Worlds – "The Eve of The War" Sony 98'
- Veronica – "Release Me" Hola 1998
- Ace of Base – "Cruel Summer" Arista 1998
- Mono – "Slimcia Girl" Mercury 1998
- Pink Floyd – "Brain Damage/Lunatic" White Label 1999
- Andrea Martin – "Share The Love" Arista 1999
- Anggun – "Secret Of The Sea" White Label 99'
- Eric Benet – "Georgy Porgy" WB 1999
- Judy Albanese – "You" Contagious 1999
- Ondar – "Tuva Groove" F111 1999
- Deborah Cox – "I Never Knew" Arista 1999
- Pink – "There You Go" La Face 1999
- DJ Rap – "Bad Girl" Columbia 2000
- Rare Blend – "Boom Boom Boom" Curb 2000
- ZINC – "Somebody Found Love" Nervous 2000
- Andreas Johnson – "Glorious" Warner/Kinetic 2000
- Changing Faces – "That Other Woman" Atlantic 2000
- The Beatles – "Eleanor Rigby" White Label 2001
- Backstreet Boys – "More Than That" Jive 2001
- Svala – "Real Me" Priority 2001
- Pru – "Aaroma" Capitol 2001
- Busta Rhymes – "Pass The Courvoisier" J records 2002
- Jewel – "Serve The Ego" Atlantic 2002
- Justin Timberlake – "Cry Me a River" Jive 2003
- Christina Aguilera – "Fighter" RCA 2003
- Lucy Woodward – "Blindsided" Atlantic 2003
- Kelly Clarkson – "Miss Independent"
- Justin Timberlake – "Senorita" Jive 2003
- Kindred – "Faraway From Here" HiddenBeach 2003
- America – "You Can Do Magic" White Label 2003
- Elton John – "Are You Ready" Ultra 2003
- Brandy (singer) – "Who Is She 2 U" Atlantic 2004
- Alicia Keys – "Diary" J Records 2004
- Dido – "Sand in My Shoes" Arista 2004
- Fabolous – "Baby" Atlantic 2005
- Fabolous – "Tit 4 Tat" Atlantic 2005
- Missy Elliott – "Lose Control" Atlantic 2005
- Rob Thomas – "This Is How a Heart Breaks" Atlantic 2005 (Unreleased)
- Katie Melua – "Just Like Heaven" Columbia 2005
- Natasha Bedingfield – "Unwritten" Epic 2005
- Lil Kim – "Lighters Up" Atlantic 2005
- Pink – "Stupid Girls" Jive 2006
- Christina Milian – "Say I" DefJam/Island 2006
- Ian Nieman pres. Liquid Sunshine – "He'd Never Do" Nervous 2006
- Jesus Jackson – "Running On Sunshine" Southern Fried.2006
- Justin Timberlake – "My Love" Jive 2006
- Christina Aguilera – "Hurt" RCA 2006
- Idina Menzel – "Defying Gravity"
- Alanis Morissette – "Not as We" WB 2008
- Anna Tsuchiya – "Bubble Trip" 2008
- Groove Armada – "Get Down" Strictly Rhythm 2008
- Avril Lavigne – "Hot" 2008
- Fleetwood Mac – "Big Love" UR 2008
- Christina Aguilera – "Keeps Getting Better" RCA 2008
- Mariah Carey – "I Want to Know What Love Is" DefJam 2009
- Dallas Cowboys Cheerleaders – "Power Squad Bod!" MTV 2009
- Donni Hotwheel – "Da Monsta Mash" White 2009
- Rihanna – "Russian Roulette" DefJam 2009
- Shontelle – "Licky" Motown 2010
- New Boyz – "You're a Jerk" WB 2010
- Britney Spears – "Megamix" Jive 2010
- Iyaz – "Replay" Reprise 2009
- Michael Bublé – "Haven't Met You Yet" Reprise 2010
- Kimberley Locke – "Strobelight" Dream Merchant 2010
- Mishal AlArouj – "Louma" AiwaGulf 2010
- Sade Vs. Dennis Ferrer – "Long Hard Transitions" UR 2010
- Chillie Gonzales vs. D. Portman – "Crying Cerberus" UR 2010
- Chillie Gonzales vs. Rober Babics – "Dark Crying Flower" UR 2011
- Sade vs. Henrick Schwarz – "Pearls & Headphones" UR 2011
- Radiohead Vs. Dennis Ferrer – "The Codex Room" UR 2011
- Andrea Martin Vs. Dennis Ferrer – "I still Love Touch The Sky" UR 2011

== Discography ==
- Hani – "Tranq Me" Planet E 1993
- Veggie Grooves – "Jeep Warehouse Beats Vol. 1" SDc 1993
- Hani – "North Seeking Project ep." King Street 1994
- Hani – "N.Y.C. Me High" Planet E 1994
- Hani – "Victim of Circumtrance" YoshiToshi 1995
- Faders Inc. – "Up'n Down" YoshiToshi 1996
- Plaza 3 – "E-vening, Mooshoo" Emotive 1996
- Joi Cardwell – "Soul To Bare" Eight Ball 1996
- Hani – "Baby wants to Ride" Groovilicious 1998
- Time Square 2000 – "The Beginning" Groovilicious 1999
- Hani vs. South Park – "Drugs Are Bad" White Label 1999
- MFF – "Born to Synthesize" Groovilicious 1999
- MFF feat: Andrea Martin – "The More I Love You" Groovilicious 2001
- Hani feat. Faith Trent – "Foolish Mind Games" 2002
- Knight Keys – "Never Felt this Way" Yoshitoshi 2003
- HaNi – "I Feel Dub" UR 1995
- Jason Walker – "Foolish Mind Games" JVM 2004
- Disconfect Feat: Andrea Martin – "Story of my Life" Robbins 2005
- Donna Summer – "Power of Love" J records 2005

== Soterios Records ==
- Miles Black Love – "All I Want"
- Hani & Roland Clark – "Must Be That Sound" 2005
- Kristine W. – "Letting Go" 2006
- Raw Sextacy – "Sextacy" 2006
- Antigen Feat Andrea Martin – "So What" 2006
- Jesus Juice – "I Am Coming" 2006
- LBN – "Look Better Naked" 2006
- Miles Black Love – "Turn It Loose" 2006
- Jack Shaft – "SuperLogical" 2006
- Hani & Andrea Martin – "Middle Of The Night" 2006
- Extra Sauce – "My Rocket" 2006
- Beethoven On LSD – "We Are Nothing" 2007
- Miles Black Love – "All I Want & Need" 2007
- Hani – "No More" 2008
- Extra Sauce – "This Healing Feeling" 2008
- Hani Feat Andrea Martin – "No More" 2008
- Tonearm & Jack Shaft – "Hunter – Gatherer" 2008
- Hani & Andrea Martin – "No More" 2008
- Hani Feat Virgin Killer – "What R U Waiting 4" 2009
- Jack Shaft – "You Make Me Happy" 2010
- Ridiculous Kool – "Keep It Kool" 2010
- Hani & Kristine W. – "Letting Go" 2010
- Extra Sauce – "Let Me Toss Your Salad" 2011
- Jack Shaft – "Chimibanga" 2011
- Miles Black Love – "They Won't Go" 2011
- Hani & Andrea Martin – "Middle Of The Night" 2012
- Hani feat. Fred Merk – "Must Be That Body Language" 2013
- A Napadol – "Chant 420" 2013
- Extra Sauce – "On It’s Way" 2013
- Miles Black Love – "Someday" 2013
- Ridikulous Kool – "Kool Loops" 2013
- Hani feat. Fred Merk – "Must Be That Body Language" 2013
- Antigen Feat Andrea Martin – "So What" 2013
- Magnetic Fields Forever – "Oxygene" 2014
- Miles Black Love – "Believe" 2014
- Brooklyn SafeHouse – "Morning Sweetness" 2014
- HaNi Feat Andrea Martin – "Higher Ground" 2015
- DJ Moist – "Take My Time" 2015
- Jack Shaft Feat Lloyd Popp – "Tears" 2015
- HaNi Feat Faith Trent – "Foolish Mind Games" 2015

== See also ==
- List of number-one dance hits (United States)
- List of artists who reached number one on the US Dance chart
