= Black Science Orchestra =

Black Science Orchestra was a musical project headed chiefly by the British DJ and producer Ashley Beedle, which produced a number of disco and rare groove-inspired house records in the 1990s.

== History ==
Enlisting the help of Rob Mello and John Howard, Black Science Orchestra made their debut in 1992 with "Where Were You", a reworking of the classic 1977 Trammps tune "The Night the Lights Went Out" (from the album The Trammps III). The record was given exposure by Frankie Knuckles, and their subsequent releases found favour with both Knuckles and the Masters at Work team over the course of 1992 and 1993.
Legal disputes, however, delayed the release of the debut Black Science Orchestra album, and when it finally appeared in 1996 it was with a revised line-up of Beedle, Marc Woolford & Uschi Classen. In 2025 he remixed primal scream.

== Discography ==
=== Albums ===
- Walters Room (Junior Boy's Own) 1996

=== Singles ===
- "Where Were You?" (Junior Boy's Own) 1992
- "Strong" (Junior Boy's Own) 1993
- "Brand New"/"New Jersey Deep" (FFRR) 1994
- The Altered States EP (Junior Boy's Own) 1994
- "City of Brotherly Love" (Junior Boy's Own) 1990
- "Save U" (Junior Boy's Own) 1996
- "Soul Power Music" (Afro Art) 2000

== See also ==
- Ashley Beedle
- X-Press 2
- Ballistic Brothers
- Black Jazz Chronicles
- Junior Boy's Own
