= Never Gonna Fall =

Single by Lisa Stansfield

from the album Lisa Stansfield
- Released: 27 October 1997
- Recorded: 1997
- Genre: R&B; soul; funk
- Length: 5:16
- Label: Arista
- Songwriters: Lisa Stansfield; Ian Devaney
- Producers: Ian Devaney; Peter Mokran

Lisa Stansfield singles chronology
"The Line" (1997)	"Never Gonna Fall" (1997)	"Don't Cry for Me" (1997)

"Never Gonna Fall" is a song recorded by British singer, songwriter and actress Lisa Stansfield for her 1997 eponymous album. It was written by Stansfield and Ian Devaney, and produced by Devaney and Peter Mokran. The single was released by Arista Records in the United States on 27 October 1997 and included remixes created by two prominent US producers: Junior Vasquez and Victor Calderone. In December 1997, it topped the Billboard Hot Dance Club Songs chart for two weeks and became Stansfield's sixth song to reach number one on this chart and third from Lisa Stansfield to do so. Stansfield performed "Never Gonna Fall" live on The Rosie O'Donnell Show. In January 1998, the song was released as a promotional single in Spain. In June 1998, two remixes of "Never Gonna Fall" were included on The Remix Album. The song was also featured on the US edition of Biography: The Greatest Hits (2003) and Junior Vasquez Mix was added to the European bonus CD of this album.

In 2014, "Never Gonna Fall" (Junior's Return To 27th & 10th Anthem) was included on the deluxe 2CD + DVD re-release of Lisa Stansfield. Additional previously unreleased Wyclef Remix was featured on People Hold On ... The Remix Anthology (2014). Both remixes were also featured on The Collection 1989–2003 in 2014.

== Critical reception ==
The song received favorable reviews from music critics. Stephen Thomas Erlewine from AllMusic said it is "uniformly strong", adding that Stansfield's voice is "seductive and sexy". Larry Flick from Billboard magazine wrote that the song will have a few longtime listeners initially reaching for comparisons to "All Around the World". He explained further that "while there are mild similarities, closer inspection shows a more jazzy feel and a keen eye on jeep soul à la Mary J. Blige and Faith Evans. Stansfield's voice is a beautiful instrument that she never stops strengthening and developing. Her performance here is a prime example of that, as she flutters to tingly heights and then drops to sultry whispers in the space of a few seconds." He also complimented the "immediate chorus". Dominic Pride from Music & Media felt it "sees her emulating the best of American soul divas". A reviewer from Press of Atlantic City stated that Stansfield "shines" on such tracks as the "breezy" "Never Gonna Fall".

== Track listings ==
- US and Spanish promotional CD single
1. "Never Gonna Fall" (Edit) – 4:08
- US promotional 12" single
1. "Never Gonna Fall" (Junior's Return To 27th & 10th Anthem) – 10:23
2. "Never Gonna Fall" (Victor Calderone Remix) – 8:43
3. "Never Gonna Fall" (Junior's Tribal Beats) – 6:06
- Other remixes
1. "Never Gonna Fall" (Junior Vasquez Mix) – 8:34
2. "Never Gonna Fall" (Victor Calderone Mix) – 7:12
3. "Never Gonna Fall" (Wyclef Remix) – 3:52

== Charts ==
Chart performance for "Never Gonna Fall"
Chart (1997–1998)	Peak position
Spain Radio (PROMUSICAE)	38
US Dance Club Songs (Billboard)	1

== See also ==
- List of number-one dance singles of 1997 (U.S.)
- List of number-one dance singles of 1998 (U.S.)
