= Ruffneck (band) =

American house music group

Ruffneck is an American house music group from New Jersey, United States, consisting of record producers Dwayne Richardson, Derek Jenkins and Shaheer Williams. They placed three singles on the U.S. Hot Dance Club Play chart, including "Everybody Be Somebody," which was based on a sample from "Bostich" by the Swiss synthpop band Yello, and spent three weeks at #1 in 1995. Their first two hits were released on Masters At Work's MAW label. Their biggest success in the UK Singles Chart occurred in 1995, when "Everybody Be Somebody" peaked at #13.

The featured vocalist on all their chart entries was Joanne "Yavahn" Thomas. Their tracks are officially credited to Ruffneck featuring Yavahn. Thomas was one of the original members of the house music trio, Jomanda. She died of colon cancer in October 2003.

== See also ==
- List of number-one dance hits (United States)
- List of artists who reached number one on the US Dance chart
