= The Only Way (song) =

Single by Lisa Stansfield
- Released: November 1982
- Recorded: 1982
- Genre: New wave; pop
- Length: 3:31
- Label: Devil; Polydor
- Songwriters: David Pickerill; Paul O'Donoughue
- Producer: David Pickerill

Lisa Stansfield singles chronology
"Your Alibis" (1981)	"The Only Way" (1982)	"Listen to Your Heart" (1983)

"The Only Way" is a song recorded by British singer Lisa Stansfield. It was written by David Pickerill and Paul O'Donoughue, and produced by Pickerill. "The Only Way" was released as a single by the Devil Records/Polydor Records in the United Kingdom in November 1982. The single's B-side included another song recorded by Stansfield, "Only Love." Both songs were released on the In Session album in 1996.

== Track listing ==
UK 7" single

1. "The Only Way" – 3:31
2. "Only Love" – 3:08
