= Ballistic Brothers =

British funky electronica band

The Ballistic Brothers (initially spelt Balistic) were a British based band comprising Ashley Beedle, Rocky & Diesel of X-Press 2 and David Hill (of Nuphonic Records). Specialising in a kind of jazz-influenced funky electronica music, the band released two full length studio albums in the mid-1990s. Darren Rock, Darren House (Rocky & Diesel) and Ashley Beedle were also known as X-Press 2.

== Discography ==
=== The Balistic Brothers vs. The Eccentric Afros Volume 1 ===
The Balistic Brothers vs. The Eccentric Afros Volume 1

Studio album by The Ballistic Brothers
- Released: 1993
- Genre: Electronic
- Label: On Delancey Street Records

The Ballistic Brothers chronology
The Balistic Brothers vs. The Eccentric Afros Volume 1 (1993)	The Balistic Brothers vs. The Eccentric Afros Volume 2 (1994)

1. "NYX 2"
2. "Gangstalene"
3. "Uschi's Groove"
4. "And it goes like this"
5. "MCF 2870"
6. "Blacker"
7. "Valley of the Afro Temple"
8. "Grovers Return"

=== The Balistic Brothers vs. The Eccentric Afros Volume 2 ===
The Balistic Brothers vs. The Eccentric Afros Volume 2

Studio album by The Ballistic Brothers
- Released: 1994
- Genre: Electronic
- Label: On Delancey Street Records

The Ballistic Brothers chronology
The Balistic Brothers vs. The Eccentric Afros Volume 1 (1993)	The Balistic Brothers vs. The Eccentric Afros Volume 2 (1994)	London Hooligan Soul (1995)

1. "Delancey Street ...The Theme"
2. "Unhooked And Lost"
3. "Save The Children"
4. "Hustler (You've Been Had)"
5. "Jam Jah"
6. "Divine Fact (Blacker 2)"
7. "Goodvibes... Goodnight"
8. "Anti-Gun Movement"

=== London Hooligan Soul ===
London Hooligan Soul

Studio album by The Ballistic Brothers
- Released: 1995
- Genre: Electronic
- Label: Junior Boy's Own

The Ballistic Brothers chronology
The Balistic Brothers vs. The Eccentric Afros Volume 2 (1994)	London Hooligan Soul (1995)	Rude System (1997)

1. "Portobello Cafe"
2. "Come On"
3. "Soho Cab Ride"
4. "I'll Fly Away"
5. "Jah Jah Call You"
6. "Mark's Lude"
7. "I Don't Know"
8. "Sister Song"
9. "A Beautiful Source"
10. "Steppin into Eden"
11. "Peckings"
12. "Uschi's Lament"

=== Rude System ===
Rude System

Studio album by The Ballistic Brothers
- Released: 1997
- Genre: Electronic
- Label: Soundboy

The Ballistic Brothers chronology
London Hooligan Soul (1995)	Rude System (1997)

Professional ratings
Review scores
Source	Rating
Allmusic	link

Track Listing:

1. "Tuning Up!" - 6:50
2. "Soul Catcher" - 6:56
3. "Marching On" - 6:07
4. "Shiva's Prelusion" - 0:19
5. "Shiva's Waltz" - 4:16
6. "The Conversation" - 4:12
7. "Future James (Jack)" - 3:44
8. "Streets Are Real" - 8:13
9. "Blacker (4 The Good Times)" - 6:09
10. "Rule of the Bone" - 5:24
11. "A Love Supreme, Pt. 1: Acknowledgement" - 5:27
12. "A Love Supreme, Pt. 2: Resolution" - 3:49
13. "Silent Runnings" - 8:36
