= Phil Mison =

British DJ, composer, and music producer

Phil Mison is a London-based DJ, composer, and music producer who has released solo work under the names of Cantoma and Reverso 68. Mison is best known for his compositions in the Balearic, ambient and electronica musical genres, which has been described as "sophisticated, exotic, and close-to-the-bone, mutable yet cohesive" by reviewer Christina Roden. Mison is especially famous in the Balearic music scene, where he has been described as a "pioneer" and a "goliath" of that genre.

Mison began DJing at London's Milk Bar in 1991 where he played warm-up sets for other artists. He lists as his influences popular DJs such as José Padilla, who helped him get his start after a chance meeting, whereupon Mison began a two-year stint at Ibiza's Café Del Mar.

Mison, as Cantoma, currently releases albums under the auspices of Leng Records.
