= Hex Hector =

American music producer and remixer

- Born: Héctor Ortiz
- Origin: New York City, New York, U.S.
- Genres: House, trance
- Occupations: DJ and producer
- Years active: 1980s–present

Hex Hector (born Héctor Ortiz) is an American music producer and remixer.

== Career ==
Born Héctor Ortiz in Manhattan, New York, of a Puerto Rican mother and Cuban father, his interest in music began at an early age. During the late 1980s and early 1990s Hex held various residencies around New York City including at the Palladium and Danceteria.

Making connections with Clivilles and Cole, Hex would launch a career with his first remix of Something 'Bout Love from Lisa Lisa and Cult Jam and go on to become a sought after remixer and music producer.

== Awards ==
In 2000, he won a Grammy for Remixer of the Year, Non-Classical.

== Discography ==
=== Original productions ===
Artist	Song	Label	Year
Rob Rob's Club World	"I Live"	Columbia Records	1996
Reina	"Find Another Woman"	Robbins Entertainment	1998
Reina	"Anything For Love"	Robbins Entertainment	1999
Donna Summer	"I Will Go with You (Con Te Partiro)"	Epic Records	1999
System 3	"The Only Way Is Up"	Columbia	1999
Rockell	"Instant Pleasure"	Robbins Entertainment	2000
Rockell	"The Dance"	Robbins Entertainment	2000
Aubrey	"Stand Still"	Groovilicious	2001
Aubrey	"Willing and Able"	Dee Vee Music	2002
Paulina Rubio	"Fire (Sexy Dance)"	World Deep Music - Sony/ATV Music Publishing, (BMI)	2002
Hex Hector (featuring Jennifer C)	"Deliverance"	GCP	2005
Hex Hector (featuring Jennifer C)	"Open Your Heart"	GCP	2005

=== Remixes ===
Artist	Song	Label	Year
Lisa Lisa and Cult Jam	"Something ’Bout Love"	Columbia/SME	1992
Donna De Lory	"Just a Dream"	MCA	1992
Suzanne Vega	"Blood Makes Noise"	A&M/PolyGram	1992
Dina Carroll	"Special Kind Of Love"	A&M/PolyGram	1992
George Lamond	"It's Always You"	Tommy Boy/Warner Bros.	1994
Patti LaBelle	"The Right Kind of Lover"	MCA	1994
Patti Austin	"Reach"	MCA	1994
MCJ (featuring Davina)	"I'm Ready"	TRIBAL America/IRS/EMI	1994
Cynthia	"How I Love Him"	Tommy Boy/Warner Bros.	1994
Donna Allen	"Love is the Thing"	Epic/SME	1994
Soul Solution	"Love, Peace & Happiness"	FFRR/PolyGram	1995
Soul Solution	"Find A Way"	FFRR/PolyGram	1995
Joi Cardwell	"Jump For Joi"	Eightball	1995
Manhattan Progression	"Pray"	Groove On	1995
Hex Hector presents The Resolution	"I Want You All Over Me (The Power and the Notion")	Strictly Rhythm	1995
Scatman John	"Scatman"	RCA/BMG	1995
Whigfield	"Saturday Night"	Curb/Atlantic	1995
Portrait	"I Can Call You Baby"	Capitol/EMI	1995
Hex Hector Presents Ground Control	"The Future"	Emotive	1995
Gladys Knight	"Next Time"	MCA	1995
Julio Iglesias	"El Choclo"	Sony Discos/SME	1996
Proyecto Uno	"Pumpin'"	Hola/Island/PolyGram	1996
Pulse (featuring Antoinette Robeson)	"The Lover That You Are"	Jellybean	1996
Pulse	"Wont Give Up My Music"	Jellybean	1996
Toni Braxton	"Unbreak My Heart"	LaFace/Arista/BMG	1996
Robi Rob's Club World feat. Jay Williams	"I Live"	Columbia/SME	1996
Robi Rob's Club World (featuring Ya Kid K)	"Shake That Body"	Columbia/SME	1996
Robi Rob's Club World Club World (featuring Deborah Cooper)	"Reach"	Columbia/SME	1996
Pulse (featuring Antoinette Robeson)	"Yum Yum"	Jellybean Records	1997
Veronica	"No One But You"	Hola/Island/PolyGram	1997
Dru Hill	"Never Make a Promise"	Island/PolyGram	1997
Serial Diva	"Keep Hope Alive"	Ministry of Sound	1997
Crystal Waters	"Just a Freak"	Mercury/PolyGram	1997
Hanson	"Mmm Bop"	Mercury/PolyGram	1997
Deborah Cox	"Things Just Ain't The Same"	Arista/BMG	1997
Aretha Franklin	"Here We Go Again"	Arista/BMG	1997
Patti LaBelle	"When You Talk About Love"	MCA	1997
Ali	"Love Letters"	Jellybean Records	1997
Pulse	"Shadows of the Past"	Island/PolyGram	1997
Baha Men	"That's The Way I Get Down"	Mercury/PolyGram	1997
Proyecto Uno	"Latinos"	Hola/Island/PolyGram	1997
Kimara Lovelace	"Circles"	King Street	1997
Veronica	"Rise"	Hola/Island/PolyGram	1997
Ilegales	"Sueño Contigo"	BMG Latin	1997
Joi Cardwell	"Soul To Bare"	DMC	1997
Yvette Michelle	"DJ Keep Playing"	BMG	1997
Allure	"All Cried Out"	Crave/SME	1997
Cristian Castro	"Si Tú Me Amaras"	BMG Latin	1997
Pulse (featuring Antoinette Robeson)	"Music Takes You"	Jellybean Records	1998
Reign	"Tu Pun Pun"	Hola/Island/PolyGram	1998
Louise	"All That Matters"	EMI	1998
Diana Ross	"I Will Survive"	Motown/PolyGram	1998
Ralph Anthony	"Oye Mi Gente"	BMG Latin	1998
Lisa Stansfield	"I'm Leavin'"	Arista/BMG	1998
La Bouche	"You Won't Forget Me"	RCA/BMG	1998
Aretha Franklin	"A Rose Is Still A Rose"	Arista/BMG	1998
N'Dea Davenport	"Bring It On"	V2/BMG	1997
Alex Braydon	"Love Is Everywhere"	Mercury/PolyGram	1998
Tamia	"Imagination"	Qwest/Warner Bros.	1998
Ceybil Jeffries	"My Dream"	Malawi Rocks	1998
Club 69 (featuring Suzanne Palmer)	"Alright"	TWISTED America/MCA	1998
Janita	"Getting Over"	550 Music/Epic/SME	1998
Dee Dee Brave	"Work It Out"	King Street	1998
Stars on 54 (Amber, Jocelyn Enriquez and Ultra Naté)	"If You Could Read My Mind"	Tommy Boy/Warner Bros.	1998
Ruben Martinez	"Visions Of Oia"	DR Productions	1998
Gloria Estefan	"Oye"	Epic/SME	1998
Deborah Cox	"Nobody's Supposed To Be Here"	Arista/BMG	1998
Degiacomo	"Theme From Love"	Whirling	1998
Reina	"Find Another Woman"	Groovalicious/Strictly Rhythm	1998
Queen Latifah	"Paper"	Motown/PolyGram	1998
Lorena Martinez	"Ritmo de la Noche"	BAB Media	1998
Gloria Estefan	"Don't Let This Moment End"	Epic/SME	1998
Kim English	"Bumpin' and Jumpin'"	Nervous	1998
Sabrina Johnston	"Yum Yum"	Starbound	1998
George Michael	"Outside"	Epic/SME	1998
GTS(featuring Melodie Sexton)	"Brand New World"	King Street	1998
98 Degrees	"Because Of You"	Universal/MCA	1998
Regina Belle	"I've Had Enough"	MCA	1999
All-4-One	"Keep It Goin' On"	Blitzz/Atlantic	1999
Shanice	"When I Close My Eyes"	LaFace/Arista/BMG	1999
Savage Garden	"The Animal Song"	Columbia/SME	1999
Richie	"Magic"	Future Genenis	1999
Whitney Houston (featuring Faith Evans and Kelly Price)	"Heartbreak Hotel"	Arista/BMG	1999
Shae Jones	"Bad Boy"	Universal	1999
Deborah Cox	"It's Over Now"	Arista/BMG	1999
Bonnie Forman	"Believe in Me"	Future Genesis	1999
Martha Wash	"Come"	Logic/BMG	1999
Jennifer Paige	"Always You"	Hollywood/Universal	1999
Donna Summer	"Love On & On"	Epic/SME	1999
Donna Summer	"I Will Go With You"	Epic/SME	1999
Whitney Houston	"I Will Always Love You"	Arista/BMG	1999
Chante Moore	"Chante's Got A Man"	MCA/Universal	1999
Reina	"Anything For Love"	Groovalicious/Strictly Rhythm	1999
Billie	"Honey to the Bee"	Virgin/EMI	1999
Sting	"Brand New Day"	A&M/Interscope/Universal	1999
Jennifer Lopez	"Waiting for Tonight"	Work/SME	1999
Luis Miguel	"Te Propongo Esta Noche"	Warner Latina	1999
Terry Dexter	"Better Than Me"	Warner Bros.	1999
Shakira	"Eyes Like Yours"	Sony Discos/SME	1999
Ricky Martin	"She's All I Ever Had"	C2/Columbia/SME	1999
Dawn Tallman	"Wake Up"	Nervous	1999
Misia	"Unforgettable Days"	BMG Funhouse	1999
Rashaan Patterson	"Treat Her Like a Queen"	MCA/Universal	1999
Diana Ross	"Until We Meet Again"	Motown/Universal	1999
NSync and Gloria Estefan	"Music of My Heart"	Epic/SME	1999
Imajuku	"Feel Like Makin' Love"	SME Japan	1999
Mary J. Blige	"Deep Inside"	MCA/Universal	1999
No Mercy	"I Have Always Loved You"	Arista/BMG	1999
Tina Turner	"When the Heartache Is Over"	Virgin/EMI	1999
Coco Lee	"Do You Want My Love"	550 Music/Epic/SME	1999
Whitney Houston	"I Learned from the Best"	Arista/BMG	1999
System 3	"The Only Way Is Up"	Columbia/SME	1999
Kristine W	"Stand in Love"	RCA/BMG	2000
Shannon	"Give Me Tonight"	Contagious	2000
Tamar Braxton	"If You Don't Want to Love Me"	DreamWorks/Interscope/Universal	2000
Anastacia	"Not That Kind"	Epic/SME	2000
Everything but the Girl	"Temperamental"	Atlantic	2000
Tracie Spencer	"Still In My Heart"	Capitol/EMI	2000
Patti LaBelle	"Time Will"	MCA/Universal	2000
Mandy Moore	"Candy"	Epic/SME	2000
Rockell	"The Dance"	Robbins/BMG	2000
Rockell	"Instant Pleasure"	Robbins/BMG	2000
Jennifer Lopez	"Feelin' So Good"	550 Music/Epic/SME	2000
Faith Hill	"Breathe"	Warner Bros.	2000
R Angels	"I Need to Know"	Motown/Universal	2000
Anastacia	"I'm Outta Love"	Epic/SME	2000
Melanie C	"I Turn to You"	Virgin/EMI	2000
Innosense	"Say No More"	RCA/BMG	2000
Lucious Jackson	"Nervous Breakthrough"	Capitol/EMI	2000
Lara Fabian	"I Will Love Again"	Epic/SME	2000
Mikaila	"So In Love With Two"	Island/IDJMG/Universal	2000
NSync	"This I Promise You"	Jive/BMG	2000
Veronica	"I'm In Love"	Jellybean	2000
Madonna	"Music"	Maverick/Warner Bros.	2000
Janet Jackson	"Doesn't Really Matter"	Virgin/EMI	2000
Kina	"Girl from the Gutter"	DreamWorks/Interscope/Universal	2000
1 Plus 1	"Cherry Bomb"	Elektra	2000
Lara Fabian	"I Am Who I Am"	Epic/SME	2000
98 Degrees	"Give Me Just One Night (Una Noche)"	Motown/Universal	2000
Toni Braxton	"Spanish Guitar"	Arista/BMG	2000
Soul Decision	"Faded"	MCA/Universal	2000
Da Buzz	"Let Me Love You"	Edel	2000
Ricky Martin	"She Bangs"	C2/Columbia/SME	2000
Kevin Aviance	"Dance For Love"	Wave	2000
Natalie Cole	"Livin' For Love"	MCA/Universal	2000
Enrique Iglesias	"Sad Eyes"	Interscope/Universal	2000
Amanda Ghost	"Idol"	Warner Bros.	2000
TRF	"Close To The End"	Avex Trax	2000
Misia	"Everything"	BMG Funhouse	2000
Kristine W	"Lovin' You"	RCA/BMG	2000
Tamia	"Stranger In My House"	Elektra	2000
Celeste Prince	"Inside Your Secret"	Java	2000
Jennifer Lopez	"Love Don't Cost a Thing"	Epic/SME	2000
Rhona Bennett	"Satisfied"	Epic/SME	2001
O-Town	"Liquid Dreams"	J/Arista/BMG	2001
Pink	"You Make Me Sick"	Arista/BMG	2001
Dream	"He Loves U Not"	Bad Boy/Arista/BMG	2001
Kim Sozzi	"Feelin' Me"	BAB/Edel	2001
i5	"Distracted"	Giant/Reprise/Warner Bros.	2001
Ayumi Hamasaki	"Seasons"	Avex Trax	2001
Britney Spears	"Don't Let Me Be the Last to Know"	Jive/BMG	2001
Ayumi Hamasaki	"Boys & Girls"	Avex Trax	2001
Anggun	"Chrysalis"	Columbia/SME	2001
Ishtar	"My Desire"	Columbia/SME	2001
Marcus	"Pop Music"	J/Arista/BMG	2001
Ayumi Hamasaki	"Kanariya"	Avex Trax	2001
Joy Enriquez	"Shake up the Party"	LaFace/Arista/BMG	2001
Toni Braxton	"Maybe"	Arista/BMG	2001
Kumi Koda	"Take Back"	Orpheus/Avex Trax	2001
Janet Jackson	"Someone to Call My Lover"	Virgin/EMI	2001
Mandy Moore	"In My Pocket"	Epic/SME	2001
Jessica Simpson	"Irresistible"	Columbia/SME	2001
O-Town	"All or Nothing"	J/BMG	2001
Ayumi Hamasaki	"Far Away"	Avex Trax	2001
LeAnn Rimes	"Soon"	Curb/Atlantic	2001
Christina Milan	"AM To PM"	Def Soul/IDJMG/Universal	2001
Amber	"Yes!"	Tommy Boy/Warner Bros.	2001
Marty Thomas	"Resurrect Me"	West End	2001
Babyface	"There She Goes"	LaFace/Arista/BMG	2001
Deborah Cox	"Absolutely Not"	J/Arista/BMG	2001
Mpress	"Maybe"	Big 3	2001
Dream	"Solve"	Avex Trax	2001
Ayumi Hamasaki	"Endless Sorrow"	Avex Trax	2001
Aubrey	"Stand Still"	Groovalicious/Strictly Rhythm	2001
Miami Sound Machine	"I'm The Only One"	Epic/SME	2001
Hex Hector	"Opus"	BMG	2001
Kumi Koda	"Trust Your Love"	Orpheus/Avex Trax	2001
Kim English	"Everyday"	Nervous	2001
Ken Hirai	"Kiss of Life"	SME Japan	2001
Paulina Rubio	"Fire"	Universal Records	2002
Angie Stone	"Wish I Didn't Miss You"	J/Arista/BMG	2002
Misia	"Neverending History"	Avex Trax	2002
HQ² Presents Kim Sozzi	"We Get Together"	Ultra	2002
Exile	"Song for You"	Avex Trax	2002
BoA	"Listen to My Heart"	Avex Trax	2002
Sherrie Lea	"Anyway"	Robbins/BMG	2002
Thalía	"Dance Dance (The Mexican)"	EMI	2002
Anastacia	"One Day In Your Life"	Epic/SME	2002
Jade Anderson	"Sugar High"	SME	2002
Thalía	"You Spin Me Around"	EMI	2002
Gloria Gaynor	"I Never Knew"	Logic/BMG	2002
Mary J. Blige	"He Think I Don't Know"	MCA/Universal	2002
Beenie Man (featuring Janet Jackson)	"Feel It, Boy"	Virgin/EMI	2002
Solu Music (featuring Kimblee)	"Fade"	Wave	2002
Cooler Kids	"Punk Debutante"	DreamWorks/Interscope/Universal	2002
Deborah Cox	"Mr. Lonely"	J/Arista/BMG	2002
Mariah Carey	"Through The Rain"	Monar C/Island/IDJMG/Universal	2002
Deborah Cox	"Up & Down"	J/Arista/BMG	2002
Thalía	"¿A Quién Le Importa?"	EMI	2002
Toni Braxton	"Hit The Freeway"	LaFace/Arista/BMG	2002
Aubrey	"Willing & Able"		2002
Celine Dion	"I Drove All Night"	Epic	2002
Purple Kitty	"Bang On"	Nervous	2003
Ricky Martin	"Relight My Fire"	Columbia/SME	2003
Sarah Brightman	"Harem"	Angel/EMI	2003
HQ² (featuring Cy Curnin)	"The Madman"	HQ²	2003
Hex Hector (featuring Aymie)	"The Light"	69	2003
Widelife	"All Things"	Capitol/EMI	2003
Blu Cantrell	"You Make Me Wanna Scream"	Arista/BMG	2003
Kim English	"C'est La Vie"	Nervous	2004
Tamyra Gray	"Raindrops Will Fall"	19/SBMG	2004
Angie Stone	"I Wanna Thank Ya"	J/RCA/SBMG	2004
Robi Dräco Rosa	"Crash Push"	SME	2004
Hex Hector	Ageha	Gate	2004
Charanga Cakewalk	"La Negrita Celina"	Artemis	2004
Geri Halliwell	"Ride It"	Virgin/EMI	2004
Toni Braxton	"The Greatest Remixes Compilation"	BMG	2004
Cal Tjader	"Manbo Mindoro"	Concorde	2004
Ami Suzuki	"Hopeful"	Avex Trax	2005
Alyson	"Nothing More To Say"	PM Media	2005
Lindsay Lohan	"Speak"	Casablanca/Universal	2005
Thalía	"Un Alma Sentenciada"	EMI	2005
Alyson	"Take A Good Look"	PM Media	2006
Shakira	"Las de la Intuición"	Norte/SBMG	2006
Fey	"Barco a Venus"	EMI	2006
Amber	"Melt with the Sun"	JCMA	2006
Taylor Dayne	"Beautiful"	Intention	2008
Kelly Rowland	"Daylight"	Columbia	2008
Jennifer Lopez	"Fresh Out the Oven"	Epic/SME	2009
Luis Miguel	"Cómo Es Posible Que a Mi Lado"	Warner Musica Latina	2009
Christina Aguilera	"You Lost Me"	RCA/BMG	2010
Toni Braxton	"Hands Tied"	Atlantic	2010
Ayumi Hamasaki	"Fairyland"	Avex Trax	2011
Jennifer Lopez	"On The Floor"	DefJam/Island Records	2011
Sean Ensign	"Boyfriend"	Sean Ensign	2012
Amy Grant	"Say Once More"	Capitol Records, Sparrow Records, Amy Grant Productions	2014
Sia and David Guetta	"Floating Through Space"	Monkey Puzzle, Atlantic	2021
