= Victor Calderone =

- Born: March 20, 1967 (age 58)
- Origin: Brooklyn, New York City, New York, United States
- Genres: House
- Occupation(s): DJ, producer
- Years active: 1980s–present
- Labels: Waveform Recordings
- Website: www.victorcalderone.com

Victor Calderone (born March 20, 1967 in Brooklyn, New York, United States) is an American electronic music producer, DJ and remixer.

== Biography ==
Raised in the Bensonhurst section of Brooklyn, Calderone was introduced into New York City's nightlife by his older brother, Cesar, who was very active in the club music business. Calderone began to dabble with turntables and other DJ-related equipment at 15. A decade later, in 1991, music mogul Seymour Stein signed both Calderone and his partner Gene LaFosse (they collaborated on a short-lived techno act called Program 2) to a contract deal with Sire Records. Shortly after the release of their first album, the group disbanded and Calderone took a self-imposed exile away from the music industry.

During the time he removed himself from the club music industry, Calderone worked in the restaurant business but eventually was encouraged to work on new projects including his first solo record, "Give It Up". Calderone later returned to No. 1 for two weeks in 2001 with "Are You Satisfied?," featuring vocals by Deborah Cooper.

Further inspired by New York's then-thriving club scene, Calderone landed gigs at many major events in the city. Calderone obtained residencies at the Roxy in New York and Liquid in Miami Beach. He then met and commenced a successful relationship with Madonna in 1998. Impressed by Calderone's innovative vision and style, he was commissioned to remix "Frozen", the first single released from her Ray of Light album. Since 1998, he has remixed eleven other singles for Madonna: "Ray of Light", "Sky Fits Heaven", "Skin", "Beautiful Stranger", "American Pie", "Music", "Don't Tell Me", "What It Feels Like for a Girl", "Die Another Day", and "Hollywood".

Following up on Madonna's recommendation, Sting selected Calderone to remix his song "Desert Rose," the second single from his 1999 Brand New Day album. The British singer did not only hire Calderone to remix the single, which was something he had never done before with his music, but even returned to the studio with him to re-record the vocals to match the remixed song's new dance-oriented rhythms. The song spent 80 weeks on the Billboard dance chart including nine consecutive weeks at No. 1 on the Hot Dance Music/Maxi-Singles Sales chart.

Besides his work with Madonna and Sting, his credits as remixer includes work for such artists as Gloria Estefan, Beyoncé Knowles, Whitney Houston, Janet Jackson, and Sarah Brightman, amongst others.

He has also collaborated with other house music producers—including Mac Quayle and most notably Peter Rauhofer, the first Grammy Award winner in the Dance Music category. Their joint effort, known as The Collaboration released a popular multi-CD set and several hit single tracks.

After a long string of successful albums and singles, Calderone established his Evolve brand in 2005 as a way to coalesce his numerous residencies around the world, including Montreal, Tel Aviv, Bulgaria, and a monthly residency at New York's Pacha.

=== Personal life ===
Calderone resides in New York City.

== Discography ==
=== Albums ===
- 1999: E=VC²
- 2001: E=VC², Vol. 2
- 2003: Resonate
- 2004: Statrax Unmixed, Vol. 1
- 2007: Evolve

=== Singles/EPs ===
- 1997: "Give It Up"
- 1997: "Beat Me Harder"
- 1997: "The Price of Love"
- 1999: "Give It Up 2000"
- 1999: "In Front (Wan It)"
- 2001: "Are You Satisfied?"
- 2002: "The Drive"
- 2003: "Deep Dark Jungle"
- 2004: "Resonate"
- 2010: "Boarding Pass / Terminal B"
- 2010: "Homegrown"
- 2011: "Pleasure Grip"
- 2012: "The Journey Begins" (With Nicole Moudaber)
- 2015: "Burden"
- 2015: "Requiem" (on the compilation A-Sides Volume III)
- 2015: "Roll EP"

=== Selected remixes ===
- "Soak Up the Sun" - Sheryl Crow
- "Precious" - Depeche Mode
- "Emotion" - Destiny's Child
- "Survivor" - Destiny's Child
- "Heaven's What I Feel" - Gloria Estefan
- "Push It" - Garbage
- "Strict Machine" - Goldfrapp
- "Audience" - Ayumi Hamasaki
- "Insatiable" - Darren Hayes
- "Naughty Girl" - Beyoncé Knowles
- "Work It Out" - Beyoncé Knowles
- "Independent Women" - Destiny's Child
- "American Pie" - Madonna
- "Beautiful Stranger" - Madonna
- "Die Another Day" - Madonna
- "Don't Tell Me" - Madonna
- "Frozen" - Madonna
- "Hollywood" - Madonna
- "Music" - Madonna
- "Ray of Light" - Madonna
- "Sky Fits Heaven" - Madonna
- "What It Feels Like for a Girl" - Madonna
- "Lola's Theme" - Shapeshifters
- "Never Gonna Fall" - Lisa Stansfield

== See also ==
- List of Number 1 Dance Hits (United States)
- List of artists who reached number one on the US Dance chart
