= Ashley Beedle =

British house music DJ and producer

Ashley Beedle (born November 25, 1962, in Hemel Hempstead, England) is a British house music DJ and producer. He was a member of the groups Black Science Orchestra and X-Press 2 in addition to releasing material under his own name.

== Career ==
Beedle first began DJing in the late 1980s during the heyday of acid house. After hearing Norman Jay on KISS FM, he became more interested in deep disco. In the early 1990s, he teamed up with Rob Mello and John Howard to form the Black Science Orchestra, who released several club hits in the 1990s (such as their remix of The Trammps's "Where Were You?", "Strong", and "New Jersey Deep"). Beedle and the Black Science Orchestra were among the first British acid house artists to achieve notice in the house music community in the United States.

While working with the Black Science Orchestra (whose debut full-length arrived late in 1994), Beedle also started a project with David Hill and Rocky & Diesel, known as The Ballistic Brothers. The resulting LP, 1994's London Hooligan Soul, was a major dance music hit. Soon after this release, he teamed up again with Rocky & Diesel as X-Press 2; their single "The Sound" became a dance hit in America.

The Ballistic Brothers returned in 1997 with a second full-length, Rude System, and alongside them Beedle released two solo EPs. Beedle continued to remix into the 2000s, and was head of the labels Soundboy Entertainment, Afroart, and Ill Sun.

In 2003, Beedle remixed Elton John's 1979 single "Are You Ready for Love". It became a number-one hit, Beedle's first chart-topper and John's fifth.

In 2010, he collaborated with Darren Morris on Mavis, an album inspired by Mavis Staples.

Beedle is one of the musicians mentioned in the lyrics to the Daft Punk song "Teachers". He featured on the song "Should I Stay or Should I Blow", from the BPA's 2009 debut album, I Think We're Gonna Need a Bigger Boat.

== Health battles ==
On September 2, 2024, it had been revealed by Beedle and his family that he had been battling against Stage 4 prostate cancer for the past four years. He received his last cancer treatment in October 2023. According to a GoFundMe set up for Beedle, "He suffered a brain bleed and seizure due to the rupture of a brain mass". It was also revealed that, during a 16-hour operation to remove the mass, "he suffered a major stroke that caused the loss of movement in the leg and arm on Ashley’s right-hand side and robbed him of his power of speech."

After just two days, the GoFundMe had already cleared more than £100,000 of the £125,000 target, including sizable donations from fellow British DJs Carl Cox, Jazzie B, Jon Carter, and Fatboy Slim.

== Discography ==
- Future Juju (1998, Nuphonic), as Black Jazz Chronicles
