= Peter Mokran =

American musician and producer

- Born: Chicago, Illinois, US
- Genres: Pop; hip hop; R&B; rock
- Occupations: Musician; mixer; mix engineer; producer; engineer
- Instruments: Keyboards; synthesizer; guitar; drum programming
- Years active: 1992–present

Peter Mokran is an American mixer, producer, engineer, and musician.

== Early life ==
Mokran was born and raised in Chicago, Illinois. Growing up, he studied classical guitar, while also learning engineering and programming as a teen. He earned a BA in music from DePaul University.

== Career ==
Mokran first received widespread notice in 1992 for mixing, engineering and producing R. Kelly’s debut, Born into the 90's, which featured two number one hits on the Billboard R&B charts and went platinum within a year of its release. The following year he engineered, mixed and programmed Kelly's second album 12 Play, which reached number one on the Billboard R&B charts. The album’s second single, "Bump n' Grind", was at the time the longest-running number one single on the Billboard R&B charts, and also rose to number one on the Billboard Hot 100. He continued to work with R. Kelly through his 2004 album Happy People/U Saved Me.

The Flaming Lips hired Mokran to remix several songs on their 1999 album The Soft Bulletin including "Race for the Prize" and "Waitin' for a Superman". Mokran was primarily known for his work in the R&B and hip hop genres, but was chosen by the Flaming Lips for his history of mixing hit singles.

He mixed the 2009 Pussycat Dolls single "Jai Ho! (You Are My Destiny)", an English-language version of the Hindi song by A. R. Rahman from the Slumdog Millionaire soundtrack.

Mokran has mixed and produced for a variety of prominent pop, R&B and hip hop artists, including Aaliyah, Sean "Diddy" Combs, Janet Jackson, Christina Aguilera, Quincy Jones, Toni Braxton, Lisa Stansfield, Mary J. Blige, Snoop Dogg, Prince and Michael Jackson. His approach to mixing has been described as unusual. He generally starts with the instruments that provide the chords and will likely need the least adjustment, setting aside the drums and vocals for later.

== Awards ==
Mokran won two 2010 Latin Grammy Awards: as engineer/mixer on the Best Pop Album By A Duo Or Group With Vocal for Dejarte de Amar by Camila; and as mixer on the Record of the Year for "Mientes" by Camila.
