= The Ultimate Collection (Barry White album) =

Compilation album by Barry White
- Released: April 25, 2000
- Recorded: 1973–1999
- Genres: R&B; soul
- Labels: UTV/Universal Records; 542 291 Hip-O/Universal Records; 175 810
- Producers: Barry White; Gerald LeVert; Jimmy Jam & Terry Lewis; Jack Perry; Tony Nicholas

Alternative Cover
- Gold rerelease, 2008

Professional ratings
Review scores
Source	Rating
Allmusic	(The Ultimate Collection)
Allmusic	(Gold)

The Ultimate Collection, aka Gold and, later, Icon 2, is a retrospective 2-disc set of Barry White's career that was released in 2000. In 2008, it was substantially re-released as part of Universal Music's Gold series with the addition of the song "Baby, We Better Try To Get It Together" and the removal of the song "Love Makin' Music".

== Track listing ==
=== Disc 1 ===
1. "I'm Gonna Love You Just a Little More Baby" (4:10)
2. "I've Got So Much to Give" (5:15)
3. "Never, Never Gonna Give You Up" (4:01)
4. "Honey, Please, Can't Ya See" (3:15)
5. "Can't Get Enough of Your Love, Babe" (3:48)
6. "Baby Blues" - Love Unlimited Orchestra (5:36)
7. "You're the First, the Last, My Everything" (4:33)
8. "What Am I Gonna Do with You" (3:40)
9. "I'll Do for You Anything You Want Me To" (4:08)
10. "Let the Music Play" (4:15)
11. "You See the Trouble with Me" (3:22)
12. "My Sweet Summer Suite" - Love Unlimited Orchestra (4:59)
13. "Don't Make Me Wait Too Long" (4:42)
14. "I'm Qualified to Satisfy You" (3:05)
15. "Midnight and You" - Love Unlimited Orchestra (5:10)

=== Disc 2 ===
1. "Loves Theme" - Love Unlimited Orchestra (4:07)
2. "It's Ecstasy When You Lay Down Next to Me" (3:24)
3. "Oh, What a Night for Dancing" (3:56)
4. "Playing Your Game, Baby" (3:38)
5. "Your Sweetness is My Weakness" (4:41)
6. "Just the Way You Are" (4:10)
7. "Love Serenade, Pts. 1 & 2" (7:48)
8. "Satin Soul" - Love Unlimited Orchestra (4:15)
9. "It Ain't Love Babe (Until You Give It)" (4:19)
10. "Love Makin' Music" (4:57)
11. "Sho' You Right" (3:57)
12. "Put Me in Your Mix" (4:42)
13. "Practice What You Preach" (3:55)
14. "Come On" (3:48)
15. "Staying Power" (3:59)

== Charts ==
=== Weekly charts ===
Weekly chart performance for The Ultimate Collection
Chart (2000–2008)	Peak position
Australian Albums (ARIA)	5
Australian Urban Albums (ARIA)	2
Austrian Albums (Ö3 Austria)	19
Belgian Albums (Ultratop Flanders)	1
Belgian Albums (Ultratop Wallonia)	3
Dutch Albums (Album Top 100)	23
Finnish Albums (Suomen virallinen lista)	2
German Albums (Offizielle Top 100)	35
Irish Albums (IRMA)	6
Italian Albums (FIMI)	6
New Zealand Albums (RMNZ)	6
Norwegian Albums (VG-lista)	2
Spanish Albums (Promusicae)	38
Swedish Albums (Sverigetopplistan)	4
Swiss Albums (Schweizer Hitparade)	73
US Billboard 200	148
US Top R&B/Hip-Hop Albums (Billboard)	98

=== Year-end charts ===
Chart (1999)	Position
Swedish Albums (Sverigetopplistan)	28

Chart (2000)	Position
Australian Albums (ARIA)	35
Belgian Albums (Ultratop Flanders)	23
Belgian Albums (Ultratop Wallonia)	23
French Compilations (SNEP)	6
Swedish Albums (Sverigetopplistan)	64

== Certifications ==
Region	Certification	Certified units/sales
Argentina (CAPIF)	Gold	30,000^{^}
Australia (ARIA)	Platinum	70,000^{^}
Belgium (BRMA)	2× Platinum	100,000^{*}
Canada (Music Canada)	Gold	50,000^{^}
Croatia (HDU)	Silver	
France (SNEP)	2× Platinum	600,000^{*}
Germany (BVMI)	Platinum	300,000^{‡}
Italy (FIMI)	Platinum	50,000^{*}
Mexico (AMPROFON)	Gold	75,000^{^}
New Zealand (RMNZ)	2× Platinum	30,000^{^}
Norway (IFPI Norway)	Gold	25,000^{*}
Spain (Promusicae)	2× Platinum	200,000^{^}
Sweden (GLF)	Platinum	80,000^{^}
Switzerland (IFPI Switzerland)	Gold	25,000^{^}
United States (RIAA)	Platinum	1,000,000^{^}
Summaries
Europe (IFPI)	5× Platinum	5,000,000^{*}
^{*} Sales figures based on certification alone.^{^} Shipments figures based on certification alone.^{‡} Sales+streaming figures based on certification alone.
