= Nuflow =

Nuflow may refer to:

- Nu Flow Technologies
- Nu-Flow the debut album from British R&B band Big Brovaz
  - Nu Flow, a single from this album
