= Gold: The Very Best of Barry White =

Compilation album by Barry White
- Released: November 7, 2005
- Genre: Soul; funk; disco
- Length: 138:54
- Label: UMTV

Professional ratings
Review scores
Source	Rating
AllMusic	3/5 stars

Gold: The Very Best of Barry White is a 2-CD compilation of Barry White's greatest hits. It was released in 2005.

== Track listing ==
CD 1:

1. "Love's Theme"
2. "I'm Gonna Love You Just a Little More Baby"
3. "I've Got So Much to Give"
4. "Never, Never Gonna Give Ya Up"
5. "Honey Please Can't Ya See"
6. "Can't Get Enough of Your Love, Babe"
7. "You're the First, the Last, My Everything"
8. "Satin Soul"
9. "What Am I Gonna Do with You"
10. "I'll Do for You Anything You Want Me To"
11. "Let the Music Play"
12. "You See the Trouble with Me"
13. "Baby We Better Try to Get It Together"
14. "Walkin' in the Rain with the One I Love"
15. "It May Be Winter Outside (But in My Heart It's Spring)"

CD 2:

1. "My Sweet Summer Suite"
2. "Don't Make Me Wait Too Long"
3. "I'm Qualified to Satisfy You"
4. "It's Ecstasy When You Lay Down Next to Me"
5. "Oh What a Night for Dancing"
6. "Playing Your Game Baby"
7. "Just the Way You Are"
8. "It's Only Love Doing Its Thing"
9. "Sha La La Means I Love You"
10. "Beware"
11. "Change"
12. "I've Got So Much to Give"
13. "Sho' You Right"
14. "Practice What You Preach"
15. "I Only Want to Be with You"

== Charts ==
=== Weekly charts ===
Chart (2005–2007)	Peak position
Italian Albums (FIMI)	39
Scottish Albums (OCC)	48
Swedish Albums (Sverigetopplistan)	3
Swiss Albums (Schweizer Hitparade)	94
UK Albums (OCC)	37

=== Year-end charts ===
Chart (2007)	Position
Swedish Albums (Sverigetopplistan)	79
