= Re-Entry (Big Brovaz album) =

Studio album by Big Brovaz
- Released: 9 April 2007
- Genres: Hip-hop; R&B
- Length: 66:38
- Labels: RAF; Genetic

Big Brovaz chronology
Nu-Flow (2002)	Re-Entry (2007)

Singles from Re-Entry
- 1. "Yours Fatally" Released: 27 September 2004; 2. "Hangin' Around" Released: 1 May 2006; 3. "Big Bro Thang" Released: 2007

Re-Entry is the second album released by UK R&B/hip-hop collective Big Brovaz. After the album was delayed in May 2006, the band finally release the follow-up to "Nu Flow" on 9 April 2007. Following the first single, "Yours Fatally" and the second single "Hangin' Around", the third single from the album, "Big Bro Thang", was received a staggered download only single release in February and March 2007. The album release also contain the Booty Luv hit "Boogie 2nite" as a bonus track.

Track 15 ("Boogie 2nite") is a remix by DJ Teddy-O and is now also available on the maxi CD of Booty Luv's "Shine"

Professional ratings
Review scores
Source	Rating
BBC	(ambivalent)
The Independent	(favorable)

== Track listing ==
1. "Big Bro Thang"
2. "Can't Hold Me Down"
3. "Must Be Crazy"
4. "Scream"
5. "Hangin' Around"
6. "I'll Be There"
7. "Hear Me Knockin'"
8. "Take Me There"
9. "Hey! Hey! (Take Me Home)"
10. "You & I"
11. "Duurty Music"
12. "All I Ever Wanted"
13. "Yours Fatally"
14. "Breaking the Cycle"
15. "Boogie 2nite" (Booty Luv) (bonus track)
16. "Nu Flow" (bonus track)
17. "Favourite Things" (bonus track)
18. "Baby Boy" (bonus track)

== Australian release (CD + DVD) ==
The album Re-Entry was released in Australia on 17 March 2008 with a bonus DVD.

=== Fan vote ===
Originally Big Brovaz ran a fan vote on their official site asking fans to pick their favourites. Below are the twenty tracks listed in that fan vote with their original titles. The songs in bold are the ones that made the final album cut and the ones that are not highlighted in bold have yet to receive a release.

1. **"Hangin' Around"**
2. **"Screaming Out"** (later re-named "Scream")
3. **"Must Be Crazy"**
4. **"What Ever You Need"** (later re-named "I'll Be There")
5. **"Can't Hold Me Down"**
6. **"Hear Me Knockin'"**
7. "Hard Core"
8. "Goin' On a Trip"
9. **"Take Me There"**
10. **"Breaking The Cycle"**
11. "Go Getter"
12. **"Big Bro Thang"**
13. "Deep in Love"
14. "Always Take You Back"
15. **"Hey Hey"** (later re-named "Hey! Hey (Take Me Home)")
16. "Feelin' Freaky"
17. **"Dirty Music"** (later re-named "Duurty Music")
18. **"All I Ever Need"** (later re-named "All I Ever Wanted")
19. "Spring Rain"
20. "Double Trouble"
