= We Wanna Thank You (The Things You Do) =

Single by Big Brovaz

from the album Scooby-Doo 2: Monsters Unleashed OST
- Released: April 5, 2004
- Genre: R&B, hip hop
- Length: 3:37
- Label: Sony/Epic Records
- Songwriters: Big Brovaz (Cherise, Nadia, J-Rock & Randy) & Dion Howell
- Producers: Skillz & Fingaz

Big Brovaz singles chronology
"Ain't What You Do" (2003)	"We Wanna Thank You (The Things You Do)" (2004)	"Yours Fatally" (2004)

"We Wanna Thank You (The Things You Do)" is a single released in 2004 by the UK hip hop/R&B group Big Brovaz. The single was the first new material since their debut album, Nu-Flow, and was the theme song for the film Scooby-Doo 2: Monsters Unleashed. "We Wanna Thank You (The Things You Do)" features a sample from Sly & the Family Stone's "Thank You (Falettinme Be Mice Elf Agin)"

"We Wanna Thank You (The Things You Do)" became Big Brovaz' sixth UK hit but, with a number seventeen chart peak, was their lowest ranked single until "Hangin' Around" in 2006. The single was their final single release in Australia but failed to make the top fifty, peaking at number fifty-six.

The single was the final single with group member Flawless.

== Track listing ==
UK CD 1

1. "We Wanna Thank You (The Things You Do)"
2. "Thank You (Falettinme Be Mice Elf Agin)"

UK CD 2

1. "We Wanna Thank You (The Things You Do)"
2. "Thank You (Falettinme Be Mice Elf Agin) (Sam Sneed remix)
3. "We Wanna Thank You (The Things You Do)" (Kardinal Beats remix)
4. "We Wanna Thank You (The Things You Do)" (video)
