= All-Time Greatest Hits (Barry White album) =

Greatest hits album by Barry White
- Released: June 7, 1994
- Genre: Soul
- Length: 77:37
- Label: Mercury Records; Universal Music Group
- Producer: Barry White

Barry White chronology
The Icon Is Love (1994)	All-Time Greatest Hits (1994)	The Ultimate Collection (1999)

Professional ratings
Review scores
Source	Rating
AllMusic	5/5 stars
Robert Christgau	A−
Music Week	4/5 stars

All-Time Greatest Hits is a compilation of Barry White's songs, released in 1994. The album includes recordings from 1973 to 1978 and an essay by David Ritz. The compilation was rereleased in 2018 under the name Love's Theme : The Best of the 20th Century Records Singles in 2018 with replacing of Satin Soul by September When I First Met You and I Love to Sing the Songs I Sing at the end.

== Track listing ==
No.	Title	Writer(s)	Length
1.	"Love's Theme"	Barry White	4:08
2.	"I'm Gonna Love You Just a Little More Baby"	Barry White	3:59
3.	"I've Got So Much to Give"	Barry White	5:18
4.	"Never, Never Gonna Give Ya Up"	Barry White	4:07
5.	"Honey Please, Can't Ya See"	Barry White	3:13
6.	"Can't Get Enough of Your Love, Babe"	Barry White	3:52
7.	"You're the First, the Last, My Everything"	Barry White; Peter Radcliffe; Tony Sepe	3:24
8.	"What Am I Gonna Do with You"	Barry White	3:34
9.	"I'll Do for You Anything You Want Me To"	Barry White	4:10
10.	"Let the Music Play"	Barry White	3:30
11.	"You See the Trouble with Me"	Barry White; Ray Parker Jr.	3:20
12.	"Baby, We Better Try to Get It Together"	Barry White	4:36
13.	"Don't Make Me Wait Too Long"	Barry White	4:36
14.	"I'm Qualified to Satisfy You"	Barry White	3:08
15.	"It's Ecstasy When You Lay Down Next to Me"	Ekundayo Paris; Nelson Pigford	3:25
16.	"Playing Your Game, Baby"	Austin Johnson; Smead Hudman	3:36
17.	"Oh, What a Night for Dancing"	Barry White; Vance Wilson	3:15
18.	"Your Sweetness Is My Weakness"	Barry White	4:12
19.	"Just the Way You Are"	Billy Joel	4:10
20.	"Satin Soul"	Barry White	4:12

== Charts ==
Chart (2025)	Peak position
Australian Albums (ARIA)	156
Greek Albums (IFPI)	56

== Certifications ==
Region	Certification	Certified units/sales
Belgium (BRMA)	Gold	25,000^{*}
New Zealand (RMNZ)	2× Platinum	30,000^{^}
United Kingdom (BPI)	Gold	100,000^{^}
^{*} Sales figures based on certification alone.^{^} Shipments figures based on certification alone.
