= HBOS Marketing Campaign =

UK bank Halifax television ad campaign

In late 2000, UK bank Halifax began a long-running television advertisement campaign featuring staff singing popular songs with the words changed to reflect its financial services products.

== Campaign ==
The campaign was the brainchild of DLKW Founders and Creative Directors Malcolm Green and Gary Betts, who had previously found fame when they launched the Gary Lineker Walkers Crisps campaign. Auditions were held and Halifax employee Howard Brown was selected by Green and Betts to spearhead the new advertising drive for the bank in 2000.

Brown was the first and most frequently featured star of these adverts. His first advert saw him sing "Extra", a song with new lyrics by Malcolm Green, set to the tune of "Sex Bomb" (originally by Mousse T featuring Tom Jones) on Boxing Day 2000. The Adverts topped Adwatch, the first time a bank had managed this feat in the survey's history.

The practice continued following the merger with Bank of Scotland, with Bank of Scotland employees were also allowed to take part, which was fully taken into account In 2002 with the "Somethin' Stupid", which feature Howard and a Bank of Scotland employee.

In 2005, at the height of Brown's popularity he toured the branch network giving Halifax customers the chance to meet him, as part of the "Giving you Extra Tour". That same year, the original advert was ranked the 13th best advertisement of all time by ITV in a top 20 list and in 2009 it was ranked as the 18th best advertisement of the decade in another top 20 ITV list.

In December 2006, Natalie Webster and four other Halifax colleagues Richard Willoughby, Jilly Ellard, Nicola Roberts and Paul Dudley, flew to Johannesburg to film the "Halifax remix" of Aretha Franklin's Think. The advertisement was first shown in February 2007. Another advertisement featured Thomas Yau from Leeds singing a version of Herman's Hermits I'm into Something Good. It was first shown in January 2008, though was axed in August 2008.

In 2008 following a review of its creative marketing campaign, company reappointed the then newly merged DLKW and Lowe agency, to revise its advert strategy to make it more serious, As advert styles were too upbeat for the then gloomy economic climate. With the move away from its upbeat singing ads, in April 2008, Howard Brown no longer starred in any more Halifax adverts, instead taking a role in its public relations department. Following the merger the Lloyds Bank, Halifax and Bank of Scotland took different routes for its advertisement.

== Animated version ==
In addition to the numerous singing and non singing adverts, between 2002 and 2006 a creatively praised animated version of Brown also appearing in adverts, voiced by London actor Paul Shearer and created in conjunction with Paris-based animation stars Numéro Six, which used the "Who Gives You Extra?" at the end of each advert. The real Howard Brown has continued to appear in the live-action adverts. Further adverts were Written and art directed by Malcolm Green and Gary Betts at DLKW (London). In an interview with news agency Reuters, Brown said:

Being in the advertising campaign has changed my life tremendously. I sometimes feel like a popstar. People recognise me everywhere I go.

== Bank of Scotland ==
In 2004, the Bank Of Scotland dropped Howard from their versions of the adverts. The Bank of Scotland stated that Scottish customers could not stand him because he was "too in-your face, and particularly annoying". HBOS admitted mistakes have been made in promoting the new image north of the border, as it did not take into account the Bank of Scotland brand nor its heritage. The replacement advertising campaign instead feature Scottish members of staff, although the animated version of Howard were used north of the border.

== Singing adverts ==
- 2000 - "Extra", set to the tune of "Sex Bomb"
- 2001 - Set to the tune of "Angel"
- 2002 - set to the tune of Ricky Martin's "Livin' la Vida Loca"
- 2002 - Set to the tune of "Who Let the Dogs Out" with Matt & Mutt
- 2002 - "Somethin' Stupid", Howard with Joanna (Bank of Scotland employee).
- 2003 - "Just a Little" by Liberty X with financial promotions in the lyrics
- 2004 - "Saving". To the tune of: "Sailing" by Rod Stewart. (Two versions created)
- 2005 - "It's a First, at Last, My Extra Thing". To the tune of: "You're the First, the Last, My Everything" by Barry White.
- 2006 - "We Give You Extra". To the tune of: "Nu Flow" by Big Brovaz.
- 2007 - "Extra". To the tune of Aretha Franklin's "Think".
- 2008 - "Something Good". To the tune of Herman's Hermits' "I'm into Something Good".
