= All-Time Greatest Hits =

All-Time Greatest Hits may refer to:

- Bobby Vinton's All-Time Greatest Hits, 1972
- All-Time Greatest Hits (Marty Robbins album), 1972
- The All-Time Greatest Hits of Roy Orbison, 1977
- All-Time Greatest Hits (Helen Reddy album), 1991
- 20 All-Time Greatest Hits!, a 1991 James Brown compilation album
- All-Time Greatest Hits (Glen Campbell album), 1993
- All-Time Greatest Hits (Barry White album), 1994
- All Time Greatest Hits (Lynyrd Skynyrd album), 2000
- All-Time Greatest Hits (Ray Stevens album), 2001
- All Time Greatest Hits (Brenda K. Starr album), 2002
- Instant Karma: All-Time Greatest Hits, a 2002 John Lennon compilation album
- All Time Greatest Hits (Loretta Lynn album), 2002
- All-Time Greatest Hits (Neil Diamond album), 2014
- All-Time Greatest Hits (LeAnn Rimes album), 2015
- All-Time Greatest Hits (Wynonna Judd album), 2018
