= Barry White's Greatest Hits =

Greatest hits album by Barry White
- Released: 1975
- Genres: R&B, soul
- Length: 41:36
- Label: 20th Century
- Producer: Barry White

Barry White chronology
Just Another Way to Say I Love You (1975)	Barry White's Greatest Hits (1975)	Let the Music Play (1976)

Professional ratings
Review scores
Source	Rating
Allmusic	4.5/5 stars
Christgau's Record Guide	A−

Barry White's Greatest Hits is the first greatest hits album released by the singer Barry White. It was originally released as a vinyl LP in 1975, and re-released on CD in 1988.

The original vinyl record contained all alternative versions of the songs. When reissued on CD, tracks two, three, six, and ten were replaced with the original versions, the latter two in edited form.

== Track listing ==
1. "What Am I Gonna Do with You" – 3:33
2. "You're the First, the Last, My Everything" – 4:35
3. "Can't Get Enough of Your Love, Babe" – 4:31
4. "Honey Please, Can't Ya See" – 3:14
5. "Love Serenade" – 7:06
6. "Never, Never Gonna Give Ya Up" – 4:50
7. "I'm Gonna Love You Just a Little More Baby" – 4:12
8. "I've Found Someone" – 3:41
9. "I've Got So Much to Give" – 3:09
10. "Standing in the Shadows of Love" – 5:21

== Charts ==
Chart performance for Barry White's Greatest Hits
Chart (1975)	Peak position
Australian Albums (Kent Music Report)	38
Belgian Albums (Ultratop Flanders)	48
New Zealand Albums (RMNZ)	13
Norwegian Albums (VG-lista)	21
Swedish Albums (Sverigetopplistan)	18
UK Albums (Official Charts)	18
US Billboard 200	23
US Top R&B/Hip-Hop Albums (Billboard)	15

== Certifications and sales ==
Certifications and sales for Barry White's Greatest Hits
Region	Certification	Certified units/sales
Canada (Music Canada)	Gold	50,000^{^}
United Kingdom (BPI)	Gold	100,000^{^}
United States (RIAA)	Platinum	1,000,000^{^}
^{^} Shipments figures based on certification alone.
