= Osama—Yo' Mama: The Album =

Studio album by Ray Stevens
- Released: February 12, 2002
- Recorded: 2001–2002
- Genre: Country
- Label: Curb
- Producer: Ray Stevens

Ray Stevens chronology
| Ray Stevens All-Time Greatest Hits (2001) | Osama—Yo' Mama: The Album (2002) | The Collection (2003) |

Osama—Yo' Mama: The Album is an album released by country music artist Ray Stevens. It was released by Curb Records on February 12, 2002. One single was released from it, which was "Osama-Yo' Mama", which peaked at number 48 on the Hot Country Songs chart in 2001 and accounted for Stevens' first chart single since "Power Tools" in 1992. The album reached number 29 on The US Top Country Albums chart.

== Track listing ==
1. "Osama-Yo' Mama" (C.W. Kalb, Jr., Ray Stevens) – 3:29
2. "Hang Up and Drive" (C.W. Kalb Jr.) – 3:02
3. "Safe at Home" (Nick Sibley) – 3:09
4. "Freudian Slip" (Stevens) – 3:00
5. "Deerslayer" (Stevens, Glenn Fortner) – 4:27
6. "Bon Temps Roulette" (C.W. Kalb, Jr.) – 3:36
7. "The Hustler" (C.W. Kalb, Jr., Carlene Kalb) – 3:38
8. "The Lady on the Radio" (Mike Neun) – 4:05
9. "Gone for Good" (C.W. Kalb, Jr.) – 2:50
10. "United We Stand" (John Goodison, Tony Hiller) – 2:49

== Chart performance ==
=== Album ===
| Chart (2002) | Peak position |
|---|---|
| U.S. Billboard Top Country Albums | 29 |

=== Singles ===
| Year | Single | US Country |
|---|---|---|
| 2001 | "Osama-Yo' Mama" | 48 |
