= In the round (disambiguation) =

In theatre, in the round is where a performance space is surrounded by the audience.

In the round may also refer to:

- Freestanding sculpture, distinct from relief carving — see Sculpture#Types
- In the Round, 1986 album by Pentangle
- In the Round (TV series), Canadian music variety television series
