= The Mike Neun Show =

- Genre: Variety
- Presented by: Mike Neun
- Country of origin: Canada
- Original language: English
- No. of seasons: 1

Production
- Producer: Ken Gibson
- Production location: Vancouver
- Running time: 30 minutes

Original release
- Network: CBC Television
- Release: 21 September 1970 – 29 March 1971

The Mike Neun Show is a Canadian music variety television program that aired on CBC Television from 1970 to 1971.

== Premise ==
Episodes of this music variety series were filmed on location at the North Vancouver Centennial Centre with additional segments recorded in various Vancouver locations. Comedian Mike Neun (In the Round) hosted with Doug Parker's house band. Visiting performers included Eleanor Collins, Chief Dan George, Pat Hervey and Terry David Mulligan.

== Scheduling ==
This half-hour series was broadcast Mondays at 7:30 p.m. from 21 September 1970 to 29 March 1971.
