= Barry White Sings for Someone You Love =

Studio album by Barry White
- Released: August 30, 1977
- Recorded: 1977
- Genre: Soul, funk
- Length: 40:30
- Label: 20th Century
- Producer: Barry White

Barry White chronology
Is This Whatcha Wont? (1976)	Barry White Sings for Someone You Love (1977)	The Man (1978)

Singles from Barry White Sings for Someone You Love
- 1. "It's Ecstasy When You Lay Down Next to Me" Released: August 1977; 2. "Playing Your Game, Baby" Released: December 1977; 3. "Oh, What a Night for Dancing" Released: March 1978

Professional ratings
Review scores
Source	Rating
AllMusic	4.5/5 stars
Christgau's Record Guide	C+

Barry White Sings for Someone You Love is the self-produced seventh album by soul singer Barry White, released in 1977 on the 20th Century label.

== Commercial performance ==
The album topped the R&B albums chart, White's first to do so since 1975. It also reached No. 8 on the Billboard 200, his second to reach the top ten. The album was a success, yielding two Billboard R&B Top Ten singles, "It's Ecstasy When You Lay Down Next to Me", which peaked at No. 1, and "Playing Your Game, Baby". "It's Ecstasy When You Lay Down Next to Me" was also a hit on the Billboard Hot 100, reaching No. 4. A third single, "Oh, What a Night for Dancing", reached No. 13 on the R&B chart and No. 24 on the pop chart. The album was digitally remastered and reissued on CD on September 24, 1996, by Mercury Records. The original vinyl album was released with three different covers. In addition to the beige fur with black letters cover shown above, the LP was also issued with dark brown fur and grey fur. Each of these covers had White's name and the album's title in white letters, and are harder to find than the more common light brown fur with black letters cover.

"Playing Your Game, Baby", the first track featured on the album, was remixed by British electronica group Groove Armada for their 2000 album Back to Mine: Groove Armada.

== Track listing ==
Side one
No.	Title	Writer(s)	Length
1.	"Playing Your Game, Baby"	Austin Johnson, Smeed Hudman	7:12
2.	"It's Ecstasy When You Lay Down Next to Me"	Nelson Pigford, Ekundayo Paris	7:00
3.	"You're So Good You're Bad"	Aaron Schroeder, Jerry Ragovoy	6:15

Side two
No.	Title	Writer(s)	Length
1.	"I Never Thought I'd Fall in Love with You"	Ronald Edward Coleman	4:48
2.	"You Turned My Whole World Around"	Frank Wilson, Danny Pearson	7:49
3.	"Oh, What a Night for Dancing"	Barry White, Vance Wilson	3:48
4.	"Of All the Guys in the World"	Barry White, Danny Pearson	3:50

== Personnel ==
- Barry White – lead vocals, arranger
- John Roberts – orchestration

Technical

- Frank Kejmar – engineer
- Grant Edwards – front cover photography

== Charts ==
Chart performance for Barry White Sings for Someone You Love
Chart (1977)	Peak position
US Billboard Top LPs	8
US Billboard Top Soul LPs	1

Singles

Chart performance for singles for Barry White Sings for Someone You Love
Year	Single	Peak chart positions			
Year	Single	US	US R&B	US Dan	UK
1977	"It's Ecstasy When You Lay Down Next to Me"	4	1	5	40
1977	"Playing Your Game, Baby"	101	8	—	—
1978	"Oh, What a Night for Dancing"	24	13	—	—

== Certifications and sales ==
Certifications and sales for Barry White Sings for Someone You Love
Region	Certification	Certified units/sales
United States (RIAA)	Platinum	1,000,000^{^}
^{^} Shipments figures based on certification alone.

== See also ==
- List of Billboard number-one R&B albums of 1977
