= S Club Allstars =

British pop group

- Also known as: S Club 3/SC3 (2008–2021); S Club Party (2014); S Club Live (2021–2022); S Club Allstars (2022)
- Genre: Pop
- Years active: 2008–2014, 2017–2023
- Spinoff of: S Club 7
- Members: Bradley McIntosh; Tina Barrett; Stacey Franks; Paul Cattermole †; Jo O'Meara

S Club Allstars (previously known as S Club 3) were an English spin-off pop group based in London with S Club and S Club 8 former members. Originally, the group was founded by Bradley McIntosh, Jo O'Meara and Paul Cattermole. In February 2014, Tina Barrett joined them and the group, but in May 2015 Cattermole left the group after the S Club reunion. In August 2020, O'Meara left the group and was replaced by Stacey Franks in December 2021.

== History ==
In 2008, Bradley McIntosh, Jo O'Meara and Paul Cattermole wanted to reform S Club 7, but the other four members were focused on their solo careers. The three artists embarked on tour with the name "S Club 3", performing at nightclubs and festivals. The first performances took place on 17 October 2008 at Tokyo Club, in Bradford. On 12 November 2008, a bottle was thrown at O'Meara during their performance in Bradford. It left her with a severe cut to the head, requiring treatment at a nearby hospital. A 20-year old man was arrested and he said that did justice for her performance on Celebrity Big Brother where nearly 50,000 complaints were received about her and two other female contestants' racist bullying towards Bollywood actress Shilpa Shetty.

On 12 November 2009, S Club 3 turned on the Mansfield Christmas Lights. Between 2009 and 2011, the group continued to tour several British cities. In 2012, the group toured Australia with Big Brovaz on The Ain't No Party Tour. On 31 May, they performed on television for the first time as S Club 3 on the Australian daytime show The Morning Show. In February 2014, Tina Barrett joined the group and they toured as a four piece. On 22 October, it was confirmed that all seven members of S Club 7 would reunite for BBC's Children in Need and a tour in May 2015. After the S Club 7 full reunion tour, Cattermole decided to leave the spin-off group and O'Meara, McIntosh and Barrett continued to perform together as S Club 3.

On 1 December 2017, the group announced on This Morning that the trio would release its first single, "Family", on 11 December. On 18 August 2019, during a performance in Falmouth, Cornwall, Spearritt joined S Club 3 for a special one-off performance. On 6 August 2020, O'Meara announced online that she had left the group to focus on her second solo album. British singer Amelia Lily was considered to replace her, but McIntosh and Barrett decided to stay as a duo and renamed the project as S Club Live. In December 2021, Stacey Franks joined the group, having previously been a member of S Club 8 (originally S Club Juniors) and they were renamed "S Club Allstars". The final performance as S Club Allstars (until the 2023 S Club reunion) happened on 23 December 2022 at the Theatre Royal & Royal Concert Hall in Nottingham. There was to be one last performance as the duo of Tina and Bradley under the name S Club Live at Flashback Fridays at the Wyld Nightclub on the Isle of Wight on 17 February 2023 but only Bradley did the set.

On 13 February 2023, S Club 7 announced that they would reunite for a two-week 25th-anniversary tour that October. On 6 April, Cattermole died of natural causes at the age of 46. His bandmates said they were "truly devastated". On 14 May, the group announced they had changed their name to S Club and that Spearritt would not join them on their coming tour.

== Discography ==
=== Singles ===
Singles released by S Club 3 (as SC3)
Title	Year	Album
"Family"	2017	Non-album single

== Concert tours ==
Headlining

- S Club Live (2008–2022)
- The Ain't No Party: Australian Tour (2012)
- S Club Party Tour (2014)

Co-headlining

- 90's Australia Tour (with B*Witched, Atomic Kitten and East 17) (2017)
- Step Back 90's (with B*Witched, Five, 911 and East 17) (2018)
- Poptastic Tour (with Five, Big Brovaz and G.R.L.) (2019)
