= OK (Big Brovaz song) =

2003 single by Big Brovaz

Single by Big Brovaz

from the album Nu-Flow
- Released: 3 February 2003
- Length: 3:08
- Label: Epic
- Songwriters: Tayo Aisida; Cherise Roberts; Nadia Shepherd; Abdul Bella; Michael Mugisha; John Paul Morsley; Thelma Howell; Michael Brown
- Producers: Skillz & Fingaz

Big Brovaz singles chronology
"Nu Flow" (2002)	"OK" (2003)	"Favourite Things" (2003)

"OK" is the second single by British R&B collective Big Brovaz, released as the second single from their debut album, Nu-Flow, on 3 February 2003. In Australia, the song served as the album's third single, as "Favourite Things" was released as the second single there. The album was re-released two weeks after the release of "OK" with the "OK" radio edit added and bonus tracks.

"OK" became Big Brovaz' second UK top-10 hit, peaking at number seven and spending nine weeks inside the top 75 of the UK Singles Chart. Despite "Nu Flow" and "Favourite Things" reaching the top three in Australia, "OK" was a commercial failure and their smallest hit there, peaking at number 64.

== Track listings ==
UK CD1

1. "OK" (radio edit)
2. "OK" (rock remix)
3. "OK" (Kardinal Beats vocal remix)
4. "OK" (video)

UK CD2

1. "OK" (radio edit)
2. "OK" (Blacksmith remix)
3. "Turn It Up"

== Charts ==
=== Weekly charts ===
Chart (2003)	Peak position
Australia (ARIA)	64
Belgium (Ultratop 50 Flanders)	24
Belgium (Ultratip Bubbling Under Wallonia)	3
Europe (Eurochart Hot 100)	23
Ireland (IRMA)	14
Netherlands (Dutch Top 40)	38
Netherlands (Single Top 100)	37
Scottish Singles Sales (Official Charts)	18
Sweden (Sverigetopplistan)	40
UK Singles (Official Charts)	7
UK Hip Hop/R&B (Official Charts)	4

=== Year-end charts ===
Chart (2003)	Position
UK Singles (OCC)	158

== Release history ==
Region	Date	Format(s)	Label(s)	Ref.
United Kingdom	3 February 2003	CD; cassette	Epic	
Australia	25 August 2003	CD	Epic	
