= Can't Get Enough (Barry White album) =

Studio album by Barry White
- Released: August 6, 1974
- Studio: Sound City, Van Nuys, California
- Genre: Soul
- Length: 31:23
- Label: 20th Century
- Producer: Barry White

Barry White chronology
Stone Gon' (1973)	Can't Get Enough (1974)	Just Another Way to Say I Love You (1975)

Singles from Can't Get Enough
- 1. "Can't Get Enough of Your Love, Babe" Released: June 28, 1974; 2. "You're the First, the Last, My Everything" Released: October 11, 1974

Can't Get Enough is the third studio album by American R&B/disco singer Barry White, released on August 6, 1974, by the 20th Century label.

== Release ==
The album topped the R&B albums chart, his third album to do so. It also topped the Billboard 200 and peaked at number 4 on the UK Albums Chart. The album included two Billboard R&B number-one singles, "Can't Get Enough of Your Love, Babe" and "You're the First, the Last, My Everything". Both were also successful on the Billboard Hot 100, peaking at numbers 1 and 2 respectively. Both singles were also hits on the UK Singles Chart, peaking at numbers 8 and 1 respectively. The album was digitally remastered and reissued on CD on March 19, 1996 by Island/Mercury Records.

== Critical reception ==
Professional ratings
Review scores
Source	Rating
AllMusic	4/5 stars
Christgau's Record Guide	B−

Village Voice critic Robert Christgau mockingly wrote: "Inspirational Clichés: 'doin' our own thing,' 'different strokes for different folks,' 'rather fight than switch.' Inspirational Emphases: 'very important,' 'very very very very true,' 'truly truly.' Inspirational Epithet: 'hope-to-die woman.' Inspirational Drum Sound: 'thwop.'"

In 2003, Rolling Stone ranked the album at number 281 on its list of "The 500 Greatest Albums of All Time", and at 283 in a 2012 revised list.

== Track listing ==
All tracks are written by Barry White, except where noted.

Side one
No.	Title	Writer(s)	Length
1.	"Mellow Mood (Pt. I)"	Barry White, Tom Brock, Robert Taylor	1:53
2.	"You're the First, the Last, My Everything"	Barry White, Tony Sepe, Peter Sterling Radcliffe	4:37
3.	"I Can't Believe You Love Me"		10:23
Total length:			16:53

Side two
No.	Title	Writer(s)	Length
1.	"Can't Get Enough of Your Love, Babe"		4:31
2.	"Oh Love, Well We Finally Made It"		3:54
3.	"I Love You More Than Anything (In This World Girl)"		5:02
4.	"Mellow Mood (Pt. II)"	Barry White, Tom Brock, Robert Taylor	1:23
Total length:			14:50

== Personnel ==
- Barry White – lead vocals, arranger, artwork concept
- Gene Page – arranger

Technical

- Paul Elmore, Frank Kejmar – engineer
- Al Harper – cover painting

== Charts ==
=== Weekly charts ===
Chart (1974–75)	Peak position
Australian Albums (Kent Music Report)	28
Austrian Albums (Ö3 Austria)	4
Canada Top Albums/CDs (RPM)	2
Italian Albums (HitParadeItalia)	1
Norwegian Albums (VG-lista)	9
UK Albums (OCC)	4
US Billboard 200	1
US Top R&B/Hip-Hop Albums (Billboard)	1

=== Year-end charts ===
Chart (1975)	Position
German Albums (Offizielle Top 100)	10
UK Albums (OCC)	42

=== Singles ===
Year	Single	Peak chart positions			
Year	Single	US	US R&B	US Dan	UK
1974	"Can't Get Enough of Your Love, Babe"	1	1	—	8
1974	"You're the First, the Last, My Everything"	2	1	2	1

== Certifications and sales ==
Certifications and sales for Can't Get Enough
Region	Certification	Certified units/sales
United Kingdom (BPI)	Gold	100,000^{^}
United States (RIAA)	Gold	500,000^{^}
^{^} Shipments figures based on certification alone.

== See also ==
- List of number-one albums of 1974 (U.S.)
- List of number-one R&B albums of 1974 (U.S.)
