= Mike Neun =

American comedian and singer

- Born: 1939
- Died: April 24, 2024 (aged 84–85); Chiang Mai, Thailand
- Occupations: Comedian, singer
- Years active: 1960s–1980s
- Notable work: The Mike Neun Show

Mike Neun (1939 — April 24, 2024) was an American comedian and singer. He was best known for hosting In the Round and The Mike Neun Show in Canada in the 1970s.

== Early life ==
Neun was born in Detroit, Michigan to Jack and Catherine Neun. He had an older brother, Tim. He graduated from Grosse Ile High School and earned a degree in Journalism from the University of Washington.

== Career ==
Mike's singing career began when he performed folk songs in clubs, and also performed during his two-year Army service. He joined his first group, the trio The Shaggy Gorillas Minus One Buffalo Fish, before forming Mike and Brian, an act as exciting as its name with Brian Blessler.

Neun co-hosted the variety show In the Round in Canada from April to June 1970, and in September of the same year, was given his own show, which aired for one season (of twenty-six episodes) until March 1971, also in Canada, and featured guests such as Chief Dan George, Terry David Mulligan, Rolf Harris and Jerry Lee Lewis.

Neun moved to Nevada and worked in Las Vegas and Reno, opening for the likes of Johnny Mathis, Ann-Margaret and Ben Vereen. Neun moved from Seattle to Spokane and in 1986 had his own television special, aired on KSPS PBS. Neun retired in the late 1980s, after twenty years of performing, playing his last gig on a cruise.

== Personal life ==
Mike met Jintana on a blind date in Chiang Mai, Thailand. He then got married in a Buddhist ceremony and were married for seveteen years. In May 2020, Neun published the book A Semi-Buddhist Ex-Comedian Golf Junkie Finds Joy in the Kingdom of Thailand. Neun was a golfer and often golfed with singer Johnny Mathis.

Neun died at his home in Thailand from prostate cancer on April 24, 2024. He was survived by his wife and sister.

== Filmography ==
| Years | Title | Role | Note |
|---|---|---|---|
| 1970 | In the Round | Co-host | Ten episodes |
| 1970—1971 | The Mike Neun Show | Host | Twenty-six episodes |
| 1974 | The Mac Davis Show | Himself - guest | One episode |
| 1974—1976 | Dinah! | Himself - guest | Eight episodes |
| 1976 | Dinah and Her New Best Friends | Himself - guest | Eight episodes |
| 1977—1979 | The Alan Hamel Show | Himself - guest | Three episodes |
