= Howard Brown (Halifax Bank) =

- Born: 1966 (age 59–60); Sheldon, Birmingham, England
- Genre: Advertising
- Occupations: Singer, sales ambassador
- Years active: 2000–2008, 2017, 2020–present

Howard Brown (born c. 1966) is a British former customer services representative and sales ambassador for HBOS plc, which owned both Bank of Scotland and Halifax Bank (previously the Halifax Building Society). He is best known for his appearances in Halifax/HBOS television advertisements, often singing and dancing.

== Biography ==
He was born in Sheldon, Birmingham, and is of Barbadian descent.

== Halifax ==
Between 1994 and 2011, Brown worked for HBOS Group. Brown became the star of the HBOS Marketing Campaign in 2000, which resulted in him singing in most of his adverts.

In June 2022, Halifax Bank announced on Twitter that they would begin adding pronouns to name tags. This received some criticism on social media, and in response Halifax doubled down on their stance. Brown condemned this decision, saying, "I think it's disgraceful. It's a service industry – you should leave politics to the politicians. They've got this one wrong."

== Music and television career ==
In 2003, he had a role in The Office Christmas special, playing himself alongside Ricky Gervais as David Brent and Paul "Bubble" Ferguson from Big Brother 2. The three men took part in a nightclub promotion Blind Date game which was hosted by Mike McClean. Brown and Bubble were getting on much better with the female contestant than Brent, much to his dissatisfaction. When Brown sat down, McClean shouted at the audience "Who gives you extra?" to which they replied "Who Who Who?". This is a reference to the Halifax advert which sings "Who gives you extra?" to the tune of "Who Let the Dogs Out?" by the Baha Men. Brown does not actually sing in that particular advert as it was performed by Matt Thornfield and Brown only appeared in cartoon form.

In 2004, the Bank of Scotland dropped Brown from their versions of the adverts, as the style of the adverts was not well received by its customers. In 2005, he released a cover of the Barry White song "You're the First, the Last, My Everything" as a charity single. It peaked at number 13 on the UK Singles Chart.

From April 2008, Brown no longer starred in the Halifax adverts, instead taking a role in its public relations department. In 2011, he left the company.

In 2017, Brown made a cameo return to the world of advertising in an advert for Hotels.com.

In February 2020, Brown appeared on the TV show First Dates. The same episode was reacted to on the TV show Gogglebox.

In February 2021, Brown appeared on the TV show Hypothetical in its third season as a special guest.
