= Let the Music Play (Barry White album) =

Studio album by Barry White
- Released: January 2, 1976
- Recorded: 1975
- Genres: R&B, disco, soul
- Length: 31:21
- Label: 20th Century
- Producer: Barry White

Barry White chronology
Barry White's Greatest Hits (1975)	Let the Music Play (1976)	Is This Whatcha Wont? (1976)

Singles from Let the Music Play
- 1. "Let the Music Play" Released: December 1975; 2. "You See the Trouble with Me" Released: February 1976; 3. "Baby, We Better Try to Get It Together" Released: July 1976

Professional ratings
Review scores
Source	Rating
AllMusic	4/5 stars

Let the Music Play is the self-produced fifth album by American R&B singer Barry White, recorded in 1975 and released in January 1976 on the 20th Century label.

== History ==
The album reached No. 8 on the R&B albums chart and peaked at No. 42 on the Billboard 200. It also reached No. 22 on the UK Albums Chart. The album yielded the Billboard R&B Top Ten single, "Let the Music Play", which was actually an outtake from his previous album Just Another Way to Say I Love You and peaked at No. 4. It also reached No. 32 on the Billboard Hot 100 and No. 9 on the UK Singles Chart. Another single, "You See the Trouble with Me", reached No. 14 on the R&B chart and No. 2 on the UK Singles Chart. A third single, "Baby, We Better Try to Get It Together", reached No. 29 on the R&B Chart, No. 92 on the Billboard Hot 100, and No. 15 on the UK Singles Chart. The album was digitally remastered and reissued on CD with bonus tracks on February 14, 2012, by Hip-O Select.

== Track listing ==
All tracks are written by Barry White, except where noted.

Side one
No.	Title	Length
1.	"I Don't Know Where Love Has Gone"	4:57
2.	"If You Know, Won't You Tell Me"	5:04
3.	"I'm So Blue and You Are Too"	7:05

Side two
No.	Title	Writer(s)	Length
1.	"Baby, We Better Try to Get It Together"		4:26
2.	"You See the Trouble with Me"	Barry White, Ray Parker	3:30
3.	"Let the Music Play"		6:16

2012 remastered bonus tracks
No.	Title	Length
7.	"Let the Music Play" (Single Version)	3:30
8.	"Let the Music Play" (Instrumental B-Side Version)	5:48
9.	"Let the Music Play" (M+M Throwback Mix)	9:07
10.	"Let the Music Play" (Funkstar's Club Deluxe Mix)	5:50
11.	"Let the Music Play" (Alternate Version)	4:34

== Personnel ==
- Barry White - lead vocals, arranger, conductor, design concept
- Ray Parker Jr. - Guitar
- Don Peake - orchestration

Technical

- Barney Perkins, Frank Kejmar - engineer

== Charts ==
=== Weekly charts ===
Chart (1976)	Peak position
Australian Albums (Kent Music Report)	75
French Albums (SNEP)	77
German Albums (Offizielle Top 100)	40
Italian Albums (FIMI)	87
Norwegian Albums (VG-lista)	12
Swedish Albums (Sverigetopplistan)	34
UK Albums (Official Charts)	22
US Billboard 200	42
US Top R&B/Hip-Hop Albums (Billboard)	8

=== Year-end charts ===
Chart (1976)	Position
US Top R&B/Hip-Hop Albums (Billboard)	44

=== Singles ===
Year	Single	Peak chart positions			
Year	Single	US	US R&B	US Dan	UK
1975	"Let the Music Play"	32	4	15	9
1976	"You See the Trouble with Me"	—	14	15	2
1976	"Baby, We Better Try to Get It Together"	92	29	—	15

== Certifications and sales ==
Region	Certification	Certified units/sales
United Kingdom (BPI)	Silver	60,000^{^}
^{^} Shipments figures based on certification alone.
