= Yours Fatally =

Single by Big Brovaz

from the album Re-Entry
- Released: September 27, 2004
- Recorded: 2004
- Genre: R&B, hip hop
- Length: 3:30
- Label: Sony / Epic Records
- Songwriter(s): Big Brovaz (Cherise, Nadia, J-Rock & Randy), Dio Howell & Pete Boxsta Martin
- Producer(s): Pete Boxsta Martin

Big Brovaz singles chronology
| "We Wanna Thank You (The Things You Do)" (2004) | "Yours Fatally" (2004) | "Hangin' Around" (2006) |

"Yours Fatally" is a single released in 2004 by the UK hip hop/R&B group Big Brovaz. It was the first single from their second album, Re-Entry and the last single released with record label Epic Records.

The album Re-Entry was originally due for release in early 2005 but due to the underperformance of "Yours Fatally" and due to their record company dropping them, the album was not released until 9 April 2007, however it was decided that this song would still be included on the album.

The single became Big Brovaz' seventh UK hit but their third consecutive single to miss the top ten, peaking at number 15. Because "Yours Fatally" was the first single from their second album, it was viewed to have underperformed considerably. It did, however, outpeak the previous single "We Wanna Thank You (The Things You Do)". The single was not released outside the UK.

"Yours Fatally" was the final single released with group member Dion, who decided not to re-join the group after their hiatus after they were dropped from Epic Records; however, her vocals were left on the version of "Yours Fatally" released on Re-Entry.

== Track listing ==
UK CD 1

1. "Yours Fatally" (radio edit)
2. "Yours Fatally" (Ron G remix)

UK CD 2

1. "Yours Fatally" (radio edit)
2. "Yours Fatally" (Ghetto Dwellaz remix)
3. "Yours Fatally" (Ray Keith remix)
4. "Yours Fatally" (video)
