= List of Billboard 200 number-one albums of 1974 =

These are the Billboard magazine number-one albums of 1974, per the Billboard 200.

Elton John's Goodbye Yellow Brick Road was the best performing album of 1974 despite not reaching number one at any point during the year. The album achieved 8 weeks atop the chart during 1973.

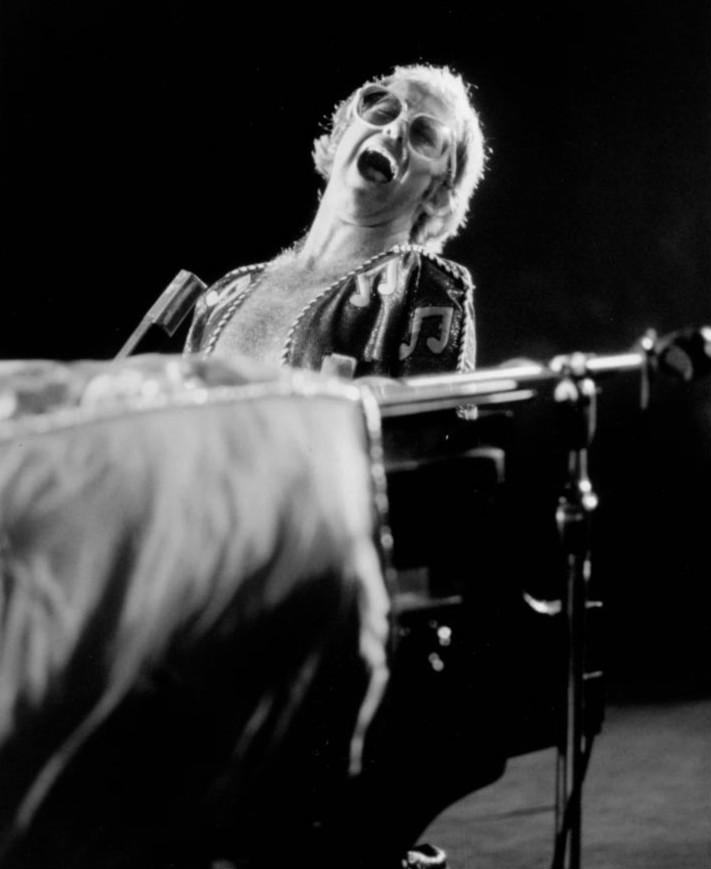
Elton John had two number one albums in 1974, Caribou and Greatest Hits, along with Goodbye Yellow Brick Road, which was the year's best-selling album despite not being number one at any point during the year.

== Chart history ==
Issue date	Album	Artist(s)	Label	Ref.
January 5	The Singles: 1969–1973	Carpenters	A&M	
January 12	You Don't Mess Around with Jim	Jim Croce	ABC	
January 19	You Don't Mess Around with Jim	Jim Croce	ABC	
January 26	You Don't Mess Around with Jim	Jim Croce	ABC	
February 2	You Don't Mess Around with Jim	Jim Croce	ABC	
February 9	You Don't Mess Around with Jim	Jim Croce	ABC	
February 16	Planet Waves	Bob Dylan With The Band	Asylum	
February 23	Planet Waves	Bob Dylan With The Band	Asylum	
March 2	Planet Waves	Bob Dylan With The Band	Asylum	
March 9	Planet Waves	Bob Dylan With The Band	Asylum	
March 16	The Way We Were	Barbra Streisand	Columbia	
March 23	The Way We Were	Barbra Streisand	Columbia	
March 30	John Denver's Greatest Hits	John Denver	RCA Victor	
April 6	John Denver's Greatest Hits	John Denver	RCA Victor	
April 13	Band on the Run	Paul McCartney & Wings	Apple	
April 20	John Denver's Greatest Hits	John Denver	RCA Victor	
April 27	Chicago VII	Chicago	Columbia	
May 4	The Sting	Marvin Hamlisch / Soundtrack	MCA	
May 11	The Sting	Marvin Hamlisch / Soundtrack	MCA	
May 18	The Sting	Marvin Hamlisch / Soundtrack	MCA	
May 25	The Sting	Marvin Hamlisch / Soundtrack	MCA	
June 1	The Sting	Marvin Hamlisch / Soundtrack	MCA	
June 8	Band on the Run	Paul McCartney & Wings	Apple	
June 15	Band on the Run	Paul McCartney & Wings	Apple	
June 22	Sundown	Gordon Lightfoot	Reprise	
June 29	Sundown	Gordon Lightfoot	Reprise	
July 6	Band on the Run	Paul McCartney & Wings	Apple	
July 13	Caribou	Elton John	MCA	
July 20	Caribou	Elton John	MCA	
July 27	Caribou	Elton John	MCA	
August 3	Caribou	Elton John	MCA	
August 10	Back Home Again	John Denver	RCA Victor	
August 17	461 Ocean Boulevard	Eric Clapton	RSO	
August 24	461 Ocean Boulevard	Eric Clapton	RSO	
August 31	461 Ocean Boulevard	Eric Clapton	RSO	
September 7	461 Ocean Boulevard	Eric Clapton	RSO	
September 14	Fulfillingness' First Finale	Stevie Wonder	Tamla	
September 21	Fulfillingness' First Finale	Stevie Wonder	Tamla	
September 28	Bad Company	Bad Company	Swan Song	
October 5	Endless Summer	The Beach Boys	Capitol	
October 12	If You Love Me, Let Me Know	Olivia Newton-John	MCA	
October 19	Not Fragile	Bachman-Turner Overdrive	Mercury	
October 26	Can't Get Enough	Barry White	20th Century	
November 2	So Far	Crosby, Stills, Nash & Young	Atlantic	
November 9	Wrap Around Joy	Carole King	Ode	
November 16	Walls and Bridges	John Lennon	Apple	
November 23	It's Only Rock 'n' Roll	The Rolling Stones	Rolling Stones	
November 30	Elton John's Greatest Hits	Elton John	MCA	
December 7	Elton John's Greatest Hits	Elton John	MCA	
December 14	Elton John's Greatest Hits	Elton John	MCA	
December 21	Elton John's Greatest Hits	Elton John	MCA	
December 28	Elton John's Greatest Hits	Elton John	MCA	

== See also ==
- 1974 in music
- List of number-one albums (United States)
