= Ain't What You Do =

Single by Big Brovaz

from the album Nu-Flow
- Released: December 8, 2003
- Recorded: 2002
- Genre: R&B, hip hop
- Length: 3:17 (radio edit); 3:46 (album version)
- Label: Sony / Epic Records
- Songwriter(s): Big Brovaz (Cherise, Nadia, J-Rock & Randy) & Dion Howell
- Producer(s): Skillz & Fingaz

Big Brovaz singles chronology
"Baby Boy" (2003)	"Ain't What You Do" (2003)	"We Wanna Thank You (The Things You Do)" (2004)

"Ain't What You Do" is a single released in 2003, by the UK hip hop/R&B group Big Brovaz. The single is the fifth and final single taken from Big Brovaz's 2002 debut album, Nu-Flow.

"Ain't What You Do" became Big Brovaz's fifth UK hit, but their first to miss the top ten, peaking at number fifteen and spending seven weeks inside the top seventy-five of the UK Singles Chart. The single was not released in Australia.

"Ain't What You Do" is based on Fun Boy Three and Bananarama's collaboration "It Ain't What You Do (It's the Way That You Do It)".

== Track listing ==
UK CD 1

1. "Ain't What You Do" (album version)
2. "Ain't What You Do" (Trackboyz remix)
3. "Ain't What You Do" (Kardinal Beats remix)
4. "Ain't What You Do" (video)

UK CD 2

1. "Ain't What You Do" (radio edit)
2. "Ain't What You Do" (Bloodshy & Avant remix)
3. "'Tis the Time to Rock the Party"
