= Big Bro Thang =

Single by Big Brovaz

from the album Re-Entry
- Released: February 26, 2007; March 19, 2007
- Recorded: 2006
- Genre: R&B, hip hop
- Length: 4:13
- Label: RAF/Genetic Records
- Songwriter(s): Big Brovaz (Cherise, Nadia, J-Rock & Randy), Dion Howell, Lars H. Jensen, Martin M. Larsson, Christina Undhjem
- Producer(s): DEEKAY

Big Brovaz singles chronology
"Hangin' Around" (2006)	"Big Bro Thang" (2007)	"Here Comes The Sun" (2014)

"Big Bro Thang" is a single released in 2007 by the UK hip hop/R&B group Big Brovaz. It was taken as the third single from their second album, Re-Entry and their first not to be released as a CD single.

The single was originally due for release in September 2006 but was pushed back until 2007 so it would be eligible to compete in Making Your Mind Up, the British pre-selection for the 2007 Eurovision Song Contest; however, Big Brovaz were voted off after the first round of voting.

It was after this exposure on BBC 1 that Big Brovaz released the single as a digital download only single, preceding the Re-Entry album release on 9 April 2007. The release dates for the digital versions were staggered between February and March, 2007.

- 26 February 2007 - DaVinChe Remix
- 5 March 2007 - Soul Seekers Mixes
- 12 March 2007 - Will Simms Remixes
- 19 March 2007 - Deekay Original Mix and the DC Joseph Mix

"Big Bro Thang" only peaked at number 171 in the official UK Singles Chart due to the group not releasing it as a CD single. The only exposure the single had was through the Making Your Mind Up show and it failed to receive both television and radio airplay.

== Track listing ==
UK digital downloads available:

1. "Big Bro Thang" (radio edit)
2. "Big Bro Thang" (album version - clean)
3. "Big Bro Thang" (DaVinChe remix - dirty)
4. "Big Bro Thang" (DaVinChe remix - clean)
5. "Big Bro Thang" (DC Joseph remix)
6. "Big Bro Thang" (Soul Seekers remix)
7. "Big Bro Thang" (Soul Seekerz remix - explicit radio)
8. "Big Bro Thang" (Soul Seekerz remix - clean radio)
9. "Big Bro Thang" (Will Simms remix)
10. "Big Bro Thang" (Will Simms remix - radio edit)
