= Baby Boy (Big Brovaz song) =

2003 single by Big Brovaz

Single by Big Brovaz

from the album Nu-Flow
- B-side: "Anything"; "Party Over Here"
- Released: 1 September 2003
- Studio: Dairy (Brixton, England)
- Length: 3:17 (radio edit); 4:02 (album version)
- Label: Epic; Daylight
- Songwriters: Michael Mugisha; John Paul Horsley; Michael Brown; Cherise Roberts; Nadia Shepherd; Dion Howell; Abdul Bello; Temi Tayo Aisida
- Producers: Skillz and Fingaz

Big Brovaz singles chronology
"Favourite Things" (2003)	"Baby Boy" (2003)	"Ain't What You Do" (2003)

"Baby Boy" is a song by British hip hop-R&B group Big Brovaz. It was released as the fourth single from their 2002 debut album, Nu-Flow, in September 2003. "Baby Boy" became Big Brovaz' fourth UK top-10 hit, peaking at number four on the UK Singles Chart. It was also their third top-10 hit on the Australian Singles Chart, peaking at number eight and receiving a platinum certification from the Australian Recording Industry Association (ARIA).

The video for the song parodies the popular sitcom Friends and was directed by Vaughan Arnell. "Baby Boy" was released across two CD singles and featured two previously unreleased tracks, "Anything" and "Party Over Here".

== Track listings ==
UK CD1

1. "Baby Boy" (radio edit) – 3:18
2. "Baby Boy" (Blacksmith remix) – 4:17
3. "Anything" – 3:40
4. "Baby Boy" (video version)

UK CD2

1. "Baby Boy" (radio edit) – 3:18
2. "Party Over Here" – 3:35
3. "Baby Boy" (Jaimeson vocal mix) – 5:45

European CD single

1. "Baby Boy" (radio edit) – 3:18
2. "Baby Boy" (Blacksmith remix) – 4:17

Australian maxi-CD single

1. "Baby Boy" (radio edit)
2. "Baby Boy" (Blacksmith remix)
3. "Baby Boy" (Kardinal beats L.A. remix)
4. "Party Over Here"

== Credits and personnel ==
Credits are lifted from the UK CD1 liner notes.

Studio

- Recorded at Dairy Studios (Brixton, England)

Personnel

- Michael Mugisha – writing
- John Paul Horsley – writing
- Michael Brown – writing
- Cherise Roberts – writing
- Nadia Shepherd – writing
- Dion Howell – writing
- Abdul Bello – writing
- Temi Tayo Aisida – writing
- Big Brovaz – vocals
- Stuart Reid – acoustic guitar, bass guitar, electric guitar, engineering, mixing
- Skillz and Fingaz – production
- Richard Morris – engineering assistance

== Charts ==
=== Weekly charts ===
Chart (2003)	Peak position
Australia (ARIA)	8
Australian Urban (ARIA)	4
Belgium (Ultratop 50 Flanders)	29
Europe (Eurochart Hot 100)	16
Ireland (IRMA)	10
Scottish Singles Sales (Official Charts)	4
New Zealand (Recorded Music NZ)	13
UK Singles (Official Charts)	4
UK Hip Hop/R&B (Official Charts)	2

=== Year-end charts ===
Chart (2003)	Position
UK Singles (OCC)	39

== Certifications ==
Region	Certification	Certified units/sales
Australia (ARIA)	Platinum	70,000^{^}
United Kingdom (BPI)	Silver	200,000^{‡}
^{^} Shipments figures based on certification alone.^{‡} Sales+streaming figures based on certification alone.

== Release history ==
Region	Date	Format(s)	Label(s)	Ref.
United Kingdom	1 September 2003	CD; cassette	Epic; Daylight	
Australia	3 November 2003	CD	Epic; Daylight	
