= Is This Whatcha Wont? =

Studio album by Barry White
- Released: November 30, 1976
- Genre: R&B, disco, soul
- Length: 35:18
- Label: 20th Century
- Producer: Barry White

Barry White chronology
Let the Music Play (1976)	Is This Whatcha Wont? (1976)	Barry White Sings for Someone You Love (1977)

Singles from Is This Whatcha Wont?
- 1. "Don't Make Me Wait Too Long" Released: October 1976; 2. "I'm Qualified to Satisfy You" Released: February 1977

Professional ratings
Review scores
Source	Rating
AllMusic	3.5/5 stars

Is This Whatcha Wont? is the self-produced sixth album by American R&B singer Barry White, released in November 1976 on the 20th Century label.

== History ==
The album reached No. 25 on the R&B albums chart, White's first to miss the top ten, and peaked at No. 125 on the Billboard 200. The album yielded two singles, "Don't Make Me Wait Too Long" and "I'm Qualified to Satisfy You" which peaked at No. 20 and No. 25 on the Billboard R&B Singles chart respectively. This was his first album that failed to produce a top ten single on that chart. Both singles also charted on the UK Singles Chart, at No. 17 and No. 37 respectively. The album was digitally remastered and reissued on CD on March 19, 1996, by Mercury Records.

== Track listing ==
All tracks are written by Barry White.

Side one
No.	Title	Length
1.	"Don't Make Me Wait Too Long"	4:42
2.	"Your Love - So Good I Can Taste It (Parts 1 & 2)"	12:33

Side two
No.	Title	Length
1.	"I'm Qualified to Satisfy You"	4:27
2.	"I Wanna Lay Down with You Baby"	8:55
3.	"Now I'm Gonna Make Love to You"	4:58

== Personnel ==
- Barry White - lead vocals, arranger
- Ray Parker Jr. - Guitar (A2)
- Gene Page - arranger

Technical

- Barney Perkins, Frank Kejmar - engineer

== Charts ==
Chart (1976)	Peak
U.S. Billboard Top LPs	125
U.S. Billboard Top Soul LPs	25

Singles

Year	Single	Peak chart positions			
Year	Single	US	US R&B	US Dan	UK
1976	"Don't Make Me Wait Too Long"	105	20	—	17
1977	"I'm Qualified to Satisfy You"	—	25	30	37
