= Hangin' Around (Big Brovaz song) =

Single by Big Brovaz

from the album Re-Entry
- Released: 1 May 2006
- Recorded: 2005
- Genre: R&B, hip hop
- Length: 3:29
- Label: RAF/Genetic Records
- Songwriter(s): Big Brovaz (Cherise, Nadia, J-Rock & Randy), Abdul Bello (aka Skillz), Hezekiah Thuo (aka Hez), Paul H. Williams, Roger S. Nichols
- Producer(s): Skillz & Hez

Big Brovaz singles chronology
"Yours Fatally" (2004)	"Hangin' Around" (2006)	"Big Bro Thang" (2007)

"Hangin' Around" is a single released in 2006 by the UK hip hop/R&B group Big Brovaz. It was the second single from their second album, Re-Entry the first with independent label RAF/Genetic Records and their first as a four-piece.

The single became Big Brovaz' lowest charting UK single to date, missing the top 40 of the UK Singles Chart completely, peaking at number fifty-seven and dropping out the following week. This is probably due to lack of airplay and video airplay as the video was ignored by channels such as The Box who had supported their previous work. Radio stations such as BBC Radio 1 also failed to playlist the track and in not doing so, it failed to make the top fifty in the UK radio airplay chart.

Due to the underperformance of both "Yours Fatally" and even more so "Hangin' Around", the Re-Entry album was pushed back further to 2007 (it was originally scheduled to be released after "Hangin' Around"). The CD single for "Hangin' Around" also featured the song "Hear Me Knockin'", which was later featured on the Re-Entry album.

"Hangin' Around" features a sample from The Carpenters' track "Rainy Days and Mondays".

== Track listing ==
UK CD 1

1. "Hangin' Around" (album version)
2. "Hear Me Knockin'" (album version)

UK CD 2

1. "Hangin' Around" (album version)
2. "Hangin' Around" (Groove mix)
3. "Hangin' Around" (Dance vocal)
4. "Hangin' Around" (Dance dub)
5. "Hangin' Around" (video)
