= Scooby-Doo 2: Monsters Unleashed =

2004 film directed by Raja Gosnell

- Theatrical release poster
- Directed by: Raja Gosnell
- Written by: James Gunn
- Based on: Scooby-Doo by Hanna-Barbera Productions
- Produced by: Charles Roven; Richard Suckle
- Starring: Freddie Prinze Jr.; Sarah Michelle Gellar; Matthew Lillard; Linda Cardellini; Seth Green; Peter Boyle; Tim Blake Nelson; Alicia Silverstone
- Cinematography: Oliver Wood
- Edited by: Kent Beyda
- Music by: David Newman
- Production companies: Mosaic Media Group; Atlas Entertainment
- Distributed by: Warner Bros. Pictures
- Release dates: March 20, 2004 (Grauman's Chinese Theatre); March 26, 2004 (United States)
- Running time: 92 minutes
- Country: United States
- Language: English
- Budget: $25–80 million
- Box office: $181 million

Scooby-Doo 2: Monsters Unleashed is a 2004 American mystery comedy horror film based on the animated franchise Scooby-Doo. The second installment in the Scooby-Doo live-action film series and the sequel to Scooby-Doo, it was directed by Raja Gosnell, from a screenplay written by James Gunn, and stars Freddie Prinze Jr., Sarah Michelle Gellar, Linda Cardellini, Matthew Lillard, Seth Green, Tim Blake Nelson, Peter Boyle and Alicia Silverstone, with Neil Fanning reprising his role as the voice of Scooby-Doo.

Scooby-Doo 2: Monsters Unleashed was released in the United States on March 26, 2004 by Warner Bros. Pictures and grossed $181 million worldwide, less than its predecessor. A third film written and directed by Gunn was planned, but it was later canceled following the second film's lower financial earnings. Like the first film, it received mostly negative reviews from critics, but it eventually amassed a cult following.

== Plot ==
A few weeks after their adventure on Spooky Island, Mystery Inc. attends the grand opening of the Coolsonian Criminology Museum, featuring an exhibit of monster costumes from their past cases. However, the celebrations are interrupted by an "Evil Masked Figure", who announces the gang's impending downfall and steals two of the costumes with help from a supernatural version of the Pterodactyl Ghost. In the aftermath, a smear campaign against the gang is started by journalist Heather Jasper Howe. Shaggy Rogers and Scooby-Doo, feeling responsible for ruining the plan to prevent the villain's escape, reflect on how many times they have previously blundered. They then vow to stop messing up in cases, making attempts to solve the mystery and redeem themselves, which confuses their friends Fred Jones, Daphne Blake and Velma Dinkley.

The gang suspects that a former enemy seeking revenge for their previous defeat is the mastermind. After dismissing the former Pterodactyl Ghost, mad scientist Doctor Jonathan Jacobo, due to his apparent death during a failed prison escape, they settle on his cellmate, Jeremiah Wickles, the former Black Knight Ghost. The gang visits Wickles' mansion, where they find a grimoire previously owned by Jacobo that serves as an instruction manual for creating real supernatural beings through black magic and mad science. Meanwhile, Shaggy and Scooby find an invite to the "Faux Ghost" nightclub, a hang-out for other exposed culprits. They are suddenly attacked by the Black Knight Ghost, but the gang escapes. Shaggy and Scooby sneak out to the Faux Ghost in disguise to interrogate Wickles, only to learn that he has mended his criminal ways. They then escape when the patrons see through their ruse.

Meanwhile, Velma identifies a key ingredient in the grimoire as "randominium", located in the old silver mines. The rest of the gang then visit the museum, accompanied by its curator Patrick Wisely, whom Velma has a crush on, only to find that all of the costumes have been stolen, which leads Patrick to solve the mystery by himself. Fred, Daphne, and Velma confront Wickles at the mines, but they learn that he is planning to reopen them as an amusement park. Upon discovering that Wickles hated Jacobo, they conclude that he is innocent. They then reunite with Shaggy and Scooby upon finding the Monster Hive, which contains a machine that transforms the stolen costumes into real monsters. Shaggy and Scooby play with the machine's control panel, inadvertently activating it and transforming some of the costumes. The gang then takes the panel before escaping.

The Evil Masked Figure and the monsters begin to terrorize Coolsville, forcing the gang to flee to their old high school clubhouse in shame. There, they realize they can reprogram the control panel by altering its wiring. When Captain Cutler's Ghost emerges from the nearby lake, the gang races back to the mines to reinstall the reprogrammed panel. The gang splits off to lure away the monsters, leaving Shaggy and Scooby to deliver the panel to the Hive. Velma finds a shrine dedicated to Jacobo seemingly built by Patrick, leading her to suspect that he is the Evil Masked Figure. However, this is proven false when he saves her from a collapsing catwalk, before he is caught by the Pterodactyl Ghost.

The gang confront the Evil Masked Figure and the other monsters at the Hive, only for the Tar Monster to capture them and prepare to suffocate them to death. Luckily, Scooby deters him with a fire extinguisher, before reconnecting and reactivating the control panel, reverting the monsters back into costumes. Mystery Inc. then unmasks the figure as Heather, only to reveal that she is actually Jacobo in disguise. Having unintentionally faked his death, Jacobo soon devised a plot for revenge against the gang, even framing Wickles to cover his tracks. With Jacobo brought back to justice, the gang is praised as heroes once again. Fred and Daphne begin a relationship, as do Velma and Patrick, Shaggy and Scooby regain their self-confidence and they all celebrate their victory at the Faux Ghost.

== Cast ==
=== Live action ===
- Freddie Prinze Jr. as Fred Jones
  - Ryan Vrba additionally portrays the character's younger self in a flashback
- Sarah Michelle Gellar as Daphne Blake
  - Emily Tennant additionally portrays the character's younger self in a flashback
- Matthew Lillard as Shaggy Rogers
  - Cascy Beddow additionally portrays the character's younger self in a flashback
  - Nazanin Afshin-Jam additionally portrays the character's likeness when he briefly gains femininity from a serum at the Monster Hive.
- Linda Cardellini as Velma Dinkley
  - Lauren Kennedy additionally portrays the character's younger self in a flashback
- Seth Green as Patrick Wisely
- Peter Boyle as Jeremiah Wickles
- Tim Blake Nelson as Doctor Jonathan Jacobo
- Alicia Silverstone as Heather Jasper Howe
- Scott McNeil as The Evil Masked Figure
- Karin Konoval as Aggie Wilkins
- Joe MacLeod, Brandon Jay McLaren and Aaron Ydenberg as a trio of skateboarders
- Calum Worthy as a bicycle-riding youngster
- Stephen E. Miller as C.L. Magnus
- Zahf Paroo as Ned
- Christopher R. Sumpton as The Zombie
- C. Ernst Harth as The Miner 49er
- Kevin Durand as The Black Knight Ghost

=== Voice cast ===
- Neil Fanning as Scooby-Doo
  - J. P. Manoux additionally portrays the character when he briefly gains high intelligence from a serum at the Monster Hive. Manoux had previously provided the voice of Scrappy-Doo's monstrous form in the first film.
- Dee Bradley Baker as the vocal effects of the Pterodactyl Ghost, the Zombie and the red-eyed Skeleton Man
- Bob Papenbrook as The Black Knight Ghost
- Michael Sorich as the Tar Monster and the Cotton Candy Glob
- Terrence Stone as The 10,000 Volt Ghost
- Wally Wingert as the vocal effects of the green-eyed Skeleton Man

=== Cameos ===
- Pat O'Brien
- Tasmanian Devil
- Ruben Studdard
- Big Brovaz

== Production ==
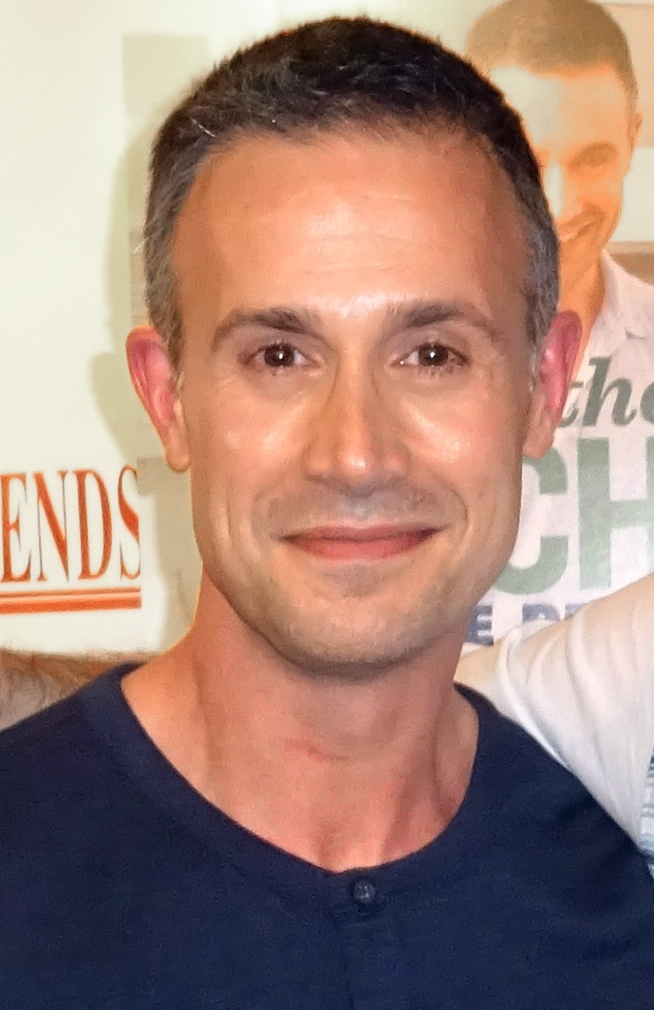
Freddie Prinze Jr.
(Fred Jones)

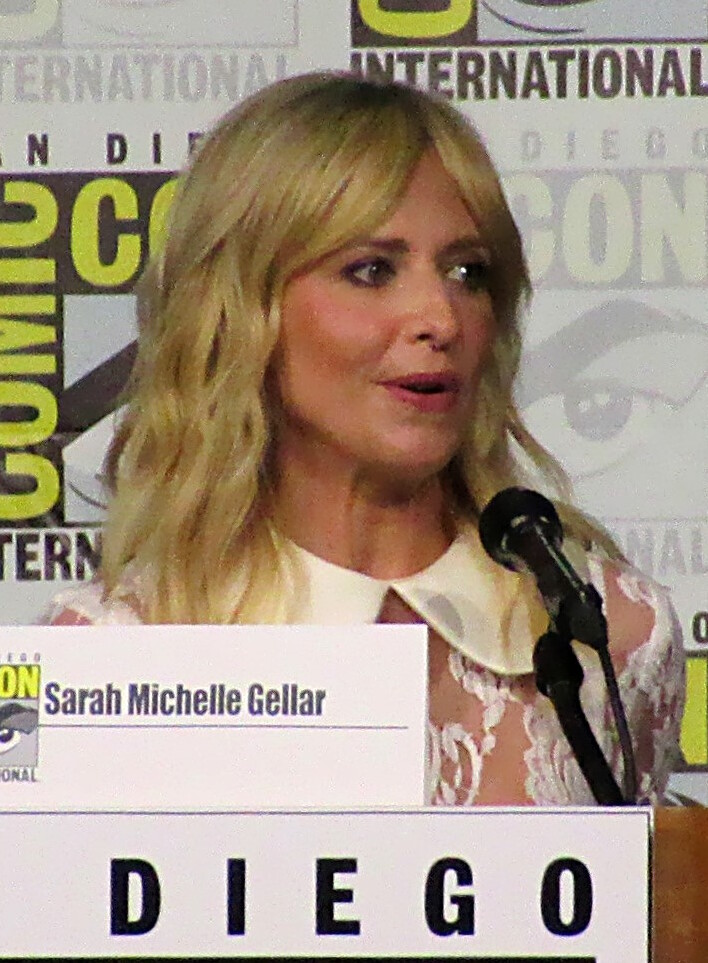
Sarah Michelle Gellar
(Daphne Blake)

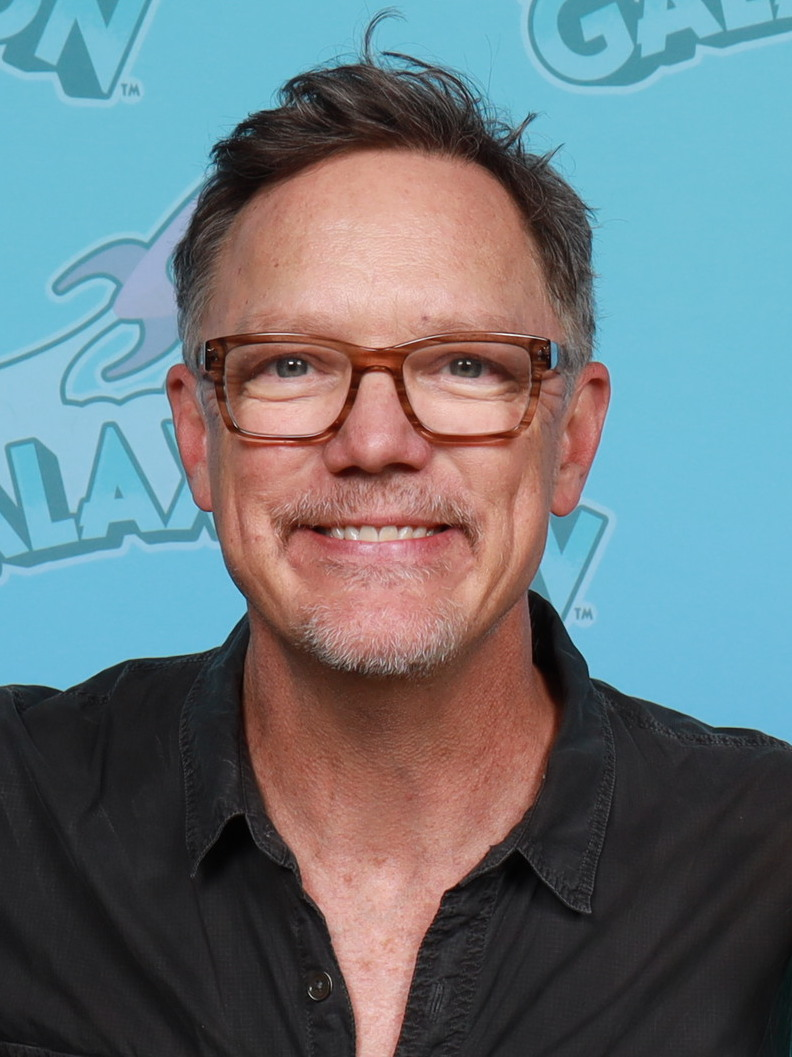
Matthew Lillard
(Norville "Shaggy" Rogers)

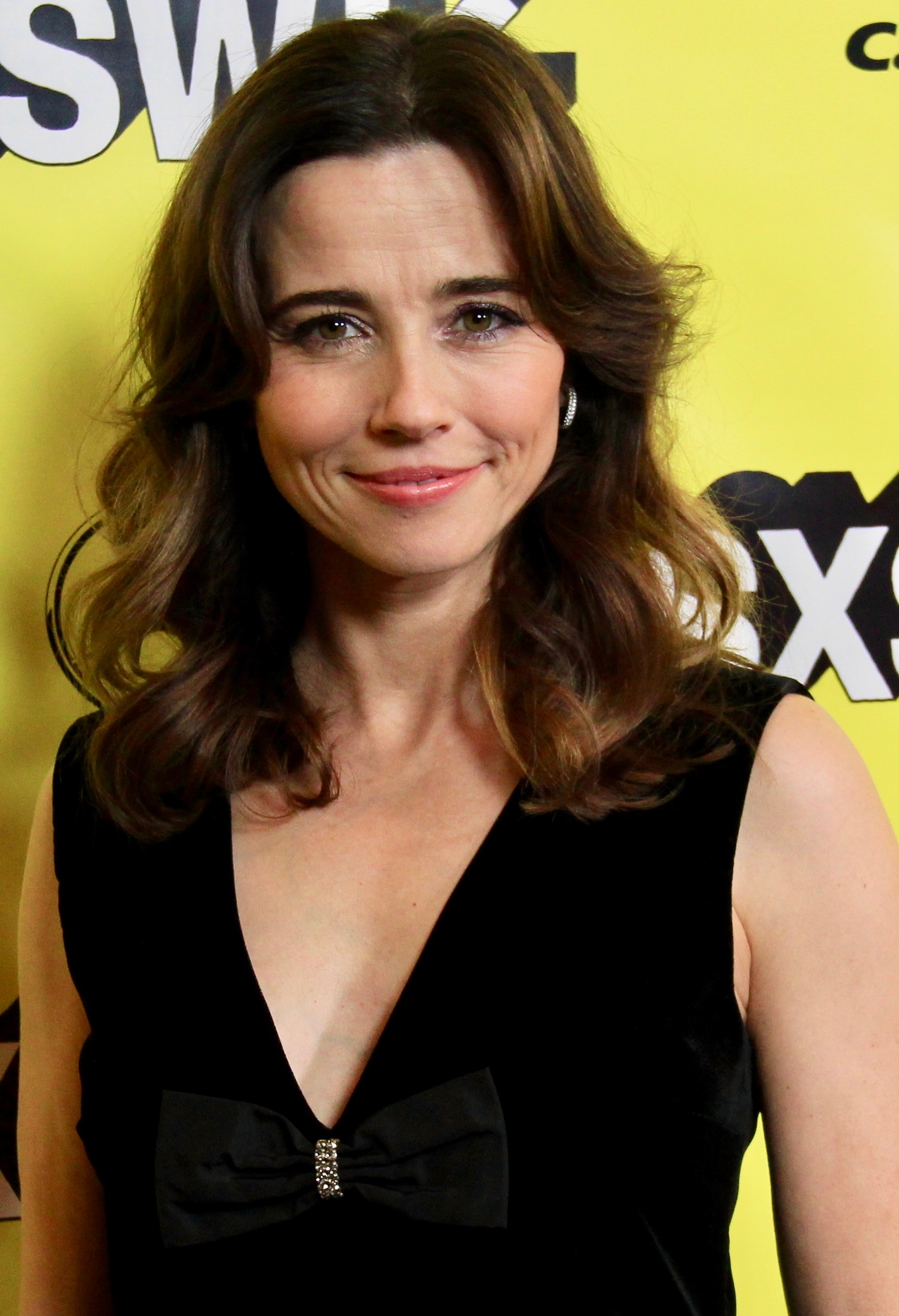
Linda Cardellini
(Velma Dinkley)

In June 2002, at the time of the release of Scooby-Doo, Dan Fellman, the president of Warner Bros. Pictures, confirmed that a sequel was in the works and was slated for a 2004 release. In March 2003, it was announced that Freddie Prinze Jr., Sarah Michelle Gellar, Neil Fanning, Matthew Lillard and Linda Cardellini would reprise their roles in the sequel. Filming for the sequel began on April 14, 2003, in Vancouver, with Seth Green and Alicia Silverstone joining the cast. During the film's 20th anniversary in 2024, screenwriter James Gunn revealed that the original title for the sequel was Scooby-Doo Unleashed.

Warner Bros. signed contracts with Burger King for tie-in promotions and product placement in the United States, and KFC for international promotions and product placement. In international releases of the film, Burger King products were replaced with KFC products. One of Shaggy's lines in which he mentions Burger King was redubbed by James Arnold Taylor, who voiced-doubled for Fanning and Lillard as Scooby and Shaggy, respectively.

== Reception ==
=== Box office ===
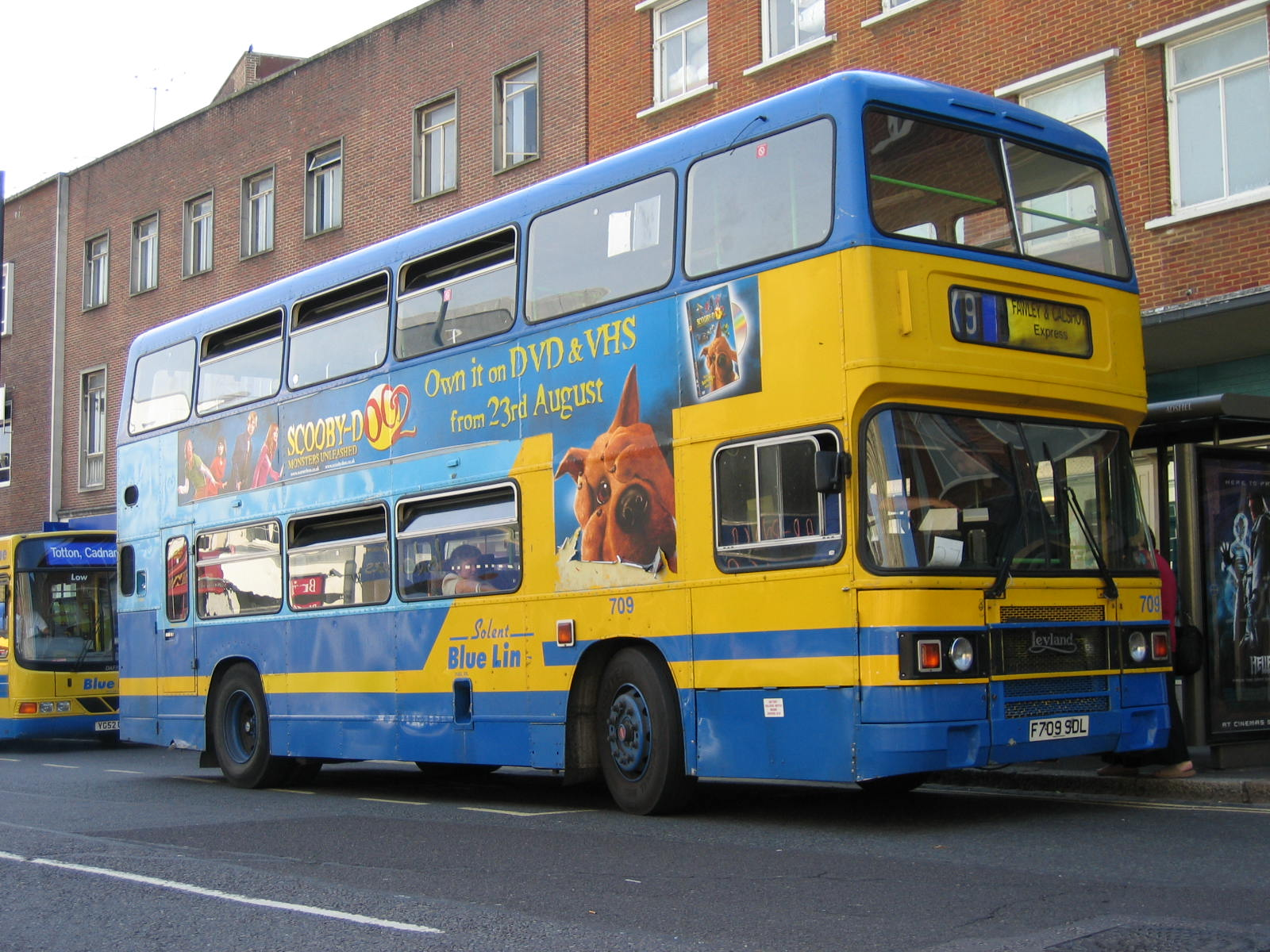
A bus advertising the film in England

Scooby-Doo 2: Monsters Unleashed opened March 26, 2004, and grossed $29.4 million (over 3,312 theaters, $8,888 average) during its opening weekend, ranking No. 1. It grossed a total of $84.2 million in North America, and went on to earn $181.5 million worldwide, more than $90 million less than the $275.7 million worldwide Scooby-Doo grossed two years earlier. It was the twenty-ninth highest-grossing film of 2004, and ranks as the sixth highest-grossing movie of all time featuring a dog (animated or otherwise) as a major character.

The film was released in the United Kingdom on April 2, 2004, topping the country's box office for three straight weekends before being dethroned by Kill Bill: Volume 2.

=== Critical response ===
On Rotten Tomatoes, Scooby-Doo 2: Monsters Unleashed holds a rating of 22% based on 119 reviews and an average rating of 4.3/10. The site's consensus reads: "Only the very young will get the most out of this silly trifle." On Metacritic, the film has a score of 34 out of 100 based on 28 critics, indicating "generally unfavorable reviews". Audiences polled by CinemaScore gave the film an average grade of "A−" on an A+ to F scale, an improvement over the previous film's "B+".

Roger Ebert of the Chicago Sun-Times gave the film two stars out of four, stating, "This is a silly machine to whirl goofy antics before the eyes of easily distracted audiences, and it is made with undeniable skill." Dave Kehr of The New York Times gave the film a negative review, saying it would, at best, serve as filler for children waiting for the upcoming release of Harry Potter and the Prisoner of Azkaban. In a two out of five review, Kevin Thomas of The Los Angeles Times described it as "a special effects bonanza that plays like an incredibly elaborate theme park ride, Scooby-Doo 2: Monsters Unleashed could be a tough go for those not already Scooby-Doo fans."

Peter Bradshaw of The Guardian gave the film a two out of five stars, stating, "it's straight down the line family fare, nothing inspired, nothing objectionable: a few funny lines." Nick DeSemlyn of Empire Magazine also gave the film two out of five stars, saying, "This sequel is a step up from the first. Scooby's animation is improved, there are some fun action sequences and a smattering of amusing moments. But the same manic mugging that spoiled the original mars this movie, and the result is a film only a six year-old on a sugar rush could love." Common Sense Media gave the film two out of five stars, saying, "Sequel is milder than original; potty humor, peril, violence."

The film won the Razzie Award for Worst Remake or Sequel.

== Home media ==
Warner Home Video released the film on DVD and VHS on September 14, 2004, in both full-screen and widescreen editions. The DVD included deleted scenes from the film's production and other special features, such as two music videos, a "making of" and trailers. On November 9, 2010, Warner Bros. released both the film and its predecessor as a double feature Blu-ray.

== Video games ==
Two video games loosely following the plot of the film were released in 2004 to coincide with the film's release; a 3D point and click adventure on the PC and a 2D beat 'em up platformer on the Game Boy Advance. In both games, one ending could only be seen by entering a code displayed at the end of the film after the credits.

== Music ==
=== Soundtrack ===
Scooby-Doo 2: Monsters Unleashed: The Album

Soundtrack album by Various artists
- Released: March 23, 2004
- Genres: Pop-punk; pop rock; R&B; hip-hop; funk; dance; beat
- Length: 50:21
- Labels: Warner Sunset; Warner Bros.
- Producer: Various artists

Singles from Scooby-Doo: Music from the Motion Picture
- 1. "Don't Wanna Think About You" Released: March 2, 2004

A soundtrack was released on March 23, 2004, on compact disc and cassette tape. Heather Phares of AllMusic gave it a lukewarm review, calling it "uninspired" and noting that it "gets the job done, but with a lot less style than its predecessor".

1. "Don't Wanna Think About You" by Simple Plan (Simple Plan had also performed the theme song of What's New, Scooby-Doo?)
2. "You Get What You Give" by New Radicals
3. "Boom Shack-A-Lak" by Apache Indian
4. "Thank You (Falettinme Be Mice Elf Agin)" by Big Brovaz
5. "The Rockafeller Skank" by Fatboy Slim
6. "Wooly Bully" by Bad Manners
7. "Shining Star" by Ruben Studdard
8. "Flagpole Sitta" by Harvey Danger
9. "Get Ready for This" by 2 Unlimited
10. "Play That Funky Music" by Wild Cherry
11. "Here We Go" by Bowling for Soup
12. "Love Shack" by The B-52's
13. "Friends Forever" by Puffy AmiYumi

"The Rockafeller Skank", "Flagpole Sitta", and "Love Shack" are not featured in the film. Certain songs are omitted from the CD, including Mark Provart's "Circle Backwards" and "Monsters", Bon Jovi's "Wanted Dead or Alive", and Clay Aiken's "The Way".

== Cancelled sequel ==
In October 2002, Warner Bros. approved production of a third film. Dan Forman and Paul Foley were hired to write the script for Scooby-Doo 3. In August 2004, Matthew Lillard said in an interview that the third Scooby-Doo film was canceled because the second had not done as well as expected, which he attributed to Warner Bros. releasing it at an inappropriate time. In a 2019 interview, James Gunn revealed that he was set to write and direct but the film did not happen due to the financial disappointment of the previous film, stating, "although it did well, it didn't do well enough to warrant a third, so the movie was never made." Gunn tweeted the plot for the canceled film in 2020, which was that "The Mystery Inc. gang are hired by a town in Scotland who complain they are being plagued by monsters but we discover throughout the film the monsters are actually the victims. Scooby and Shaggy have to come to terms with their own prejudices and narrow belief systems."

== See also ==
- List of films featuring dinosaurs
