= Back to Mine: Groove Armada =

Mixtape by Groove Armada
- Released: 5 September 2000
- Length: 69:08
- Label: Ultra
- Producer: Groove Armada

Back to Mine chronology
Back to Mine: Danny Tenaglia (1999)	Back to Mine: Groove Armada (2000)	Back to Mine: Faithless (2000)

Professional ratings
Review scores
Source	Rating
AllMusic	3/5 stars
Pitchfork	3.2/10

Back to Mine: Groove Armada is a compilation album from the Back to Mine series from Ultra Records. The mixtape was released in 2000. It was compiled by British electronica band Groove Armada.

== Track listing ==
Back to Mine: Groove Armada track listing
No.	Title	Artist	Length
1.	"Description of a Fool"	A Tribe Called Quest	6:13
2.	"Playing Your Game Baby"	Barry White	6:06
3.	"Piano Grand"	Tony D	3:43
4.	"Stanways Revenge"	Sidewinder	5:31
5.	"Snappiness"	BBG	6:36
6.	"No. 1"	Sir Raymond Mang	6:35
7.	"The Sound of Music"	Dayton	4:43
8.	"Your Song"	Groove Armada	2:55
9.	"Next Type of Motion"	Roots Manuva	5:23
10.	"Light My Fire"	Al Green	4:07
11.	"I Should've Known Better"	Mica Paris	4:52
12.	"Destination"	Schmoov	5:26
13.	"Tall Stories"	Chaser	2:35
14.	"Pharaohs"	Tears for Fears	4:23

== Certifications ==
Certifications for Back to Mine: Groove Armada
Region	Certification	Certified units/sales
United Kingdom (BPI)	Silver	60,000^{^}
^{^} Shipments figures based on certification alone.
