= Favourite Things =

2003 single by Big Brovaz

Single by Big Brovaz

from the album Nu-Flow
- B-side: "My Favourite Things"
- Released: 5 May 2003
- Studio: Dairy (Brixton, England)
- Length: 3:42
- Label: Epic; Daylight
- Songwriters: Richard Rodgers; Oscar Hammerstein II
- Producers: Skillz and Fingaz

Big Brovaz singles chronology
"OK" (2003)	"Favourite Things" (2003)	"Baby Boy" (2003)

"Favourite Things" is a song by British hip hop and R&B group Big Brovaz from their 2002 debut album, Nu-Flow. The album was re-released for a third time only six weeks after the previous re-issue to include "Favourite Things", which was not contained on either of the previous two issues of the album. The track was released as the album's third single (second in Australia) on 5 May 2003. The song is based on "My Favourite Things" from the musical The Sound of Music.

"Favourite Things" became Big Brovaz' third UK top-10 hit as well as their highest-charting single, peaking at number two and spending three months inside the top 75 of the UK Singles Chart. It also entered the top 10 in Australia, reaching number three to match the peak of the group's debut single "Nu Flow". The video for the song consists mainly of the group at a funfair with bright lights and a merry-go-round.

== Background ==
The song is based on a popular song from the musical The Sound of Music, "My Favourite Things". The single follows the same basic tune of the original song, but lyrically as the "favourite things" are focused on expensive and glamorous objects that the group wanted, such as "diamonds and rubies, I'm crazy 'bout Bentleys, Gucci dresses and drop top Kompressors". This is in contrast to the original song that typically focusses on thoroughly simple and non-glamorous pleasures. The group also recorded a version of the original "My Favourite Things" song, including it as a bonus hidden track on their debut album and also featuring it on the CD singles of "Favourite Things".

== Track listings ==
UK CD1

1. "Favourite Things" (album version) – 3:47
2. "Favourite Things" (Blacksmith remix) – 4:33
3. "Favourite Things" (The Beat Digglerz remix) – 3:36
4. "My Favourite Things" (original version) – 2:18
5. "Favourite Things" (video version) – 3:47

UK CD2

1. "Favourite Things" (album version) – 3:47
2. "Favourite Things" (Kardinal Beats remix) – 4:00
3. "Favourite Things" (Trackboyz remix) – 3:53
4. "My Favourite Things" (original version) – 2:18

European CD single

1. "Favourite Things" (album version) – 3:47
2. "My Favourite Things" (original version) – 2:18

Australian CD single

1. "Favourite Things" (album version) – 3:41
2. "Favourite Things" (Kardinal Beats remix) – 4:01
3. "Favourite Things" (Trackboyz remix) – 3:53
4. "Favourite Things" (Juliano Creator and the Beat Digglerz remix) – 3:35
5. "My Favourite Things" (original version) – 2:14

== Charts ==
=== Weekly charts ===
Chart (2003)	Peak position
Australia (ARIA)	3
Australian Urban (ARIA)	2
Belgium (Ultratop 50 Flanders)	17
Europe (Eurochart Hot 100)	8
Ireland (IRMA)	6
Netherlands (Single Top 100)	76
New Zealand (Recorded Music NZ)	3
Scottish Singles Sales (Official Charts)	4
Sweden (Sverigetopplistan)	47
UK Singles (Official Charts)	2
UK Hip Hop/R&B (Official Charts)	2

=== Year-end charts ===
Chart (2003)	Position
Ireland (IRMA)	87
UK Singles (OCC)	45

== Certifications ==
Region	Certification	Certified units/sales
Australia (ARIA)	Gold	35,000^{^}
United Kingdom (BPI)	Silver	200,000^{‡}
^{^} Shipments figures based on certification alone.^{‡} Sales+streaming figures based on certification alone.

== Release history ==
Region	Date	Format(s)	Label(s)	Ref.
United Kingdom	5 May 2003	CD; cassette	Epic; Daylight	
Australia	2 June 2003	CD	Epic; Daylight	
United States	9 June 2003	Rhythmic contemporary radio	Epic; Daylight	
United Kingdom	5 August 2003	Digital download	Epic; Daylight	
United States	11 August 2003	Contemporary hit radio	Epic; Daylight	
