= All-Time Greatest Hits (Ray Stevens album) =

Compilation album by Ray Stevens
- Released: April 3, 2001
- Genre: Pop, country, novelty, comedy
- Length: 75:30
- Label: Varèse Sarabande
- Producer: Cary E. Mansfield

Ray Stevens chronology
Funniest Characters (2000)	All-Time Greatest Hits (2001)	Osama-Yo' Mama, The Album (2002)

All-Time Greatest Hits is a collection of 23 songs that were previously recorded by Ray Stevens, released in 2001. Like many collections of Stevens' music, it concentrates 99% on recordings that were made for the record labels of Monument and Barnaby. The one exception is the first track, "Sergeant Preston of the Yukon," an unsuccessful hit (it charted but failed to make the Billboard Hot 100) that was released in 1960 by the NRC label. "Sergeant Preston of the Yukon" makes its first album appearance on this collection. The rest of the selections were recorded between the years of 1966 to 1975.

Inside the album cover is a brief essay of Stevens' career that is written by Brian Mansfield along with images of single covers of Stevens' hits "Mr. Businessman," "Gitarzan," "Sunday Mornin' Comin' Down," and "Everything Is Beautiful." In the essay, it is revealed that Stevens' first hit to chart, "Sergeant Preston of the Yukon," was a spoof of the CBS TV series of the same name. As this record slowly gained national attention, the company that owned the rights to the character of Sergeant Preston stated that Stevens used the character without permission and threatened a lawsuit if the record was not removed from the market. As a result, the single only peaked at #108 on the American Pop charts.

While most collections contain the album version of "Freddie Feelgood (And His Funky Little Five Piece Band)" (which was included on Stevens' 1969 album Gitarzan and overdubbed with audience noises), this compilation contains the single version that was released in 1966. Additionally, the selections of "Ahab the Arab," "Harry the Hairy Ape," and "Funny Man" on this collection are not the original hits that were released by Mercury Records but re-recordings for Monument Records (though the collection mistakenly says that "Ahab the Arab" and "Harry the Hairy Ape" were live recordings; they were overdubbed with audience noises). The track "Isn't It Lonely Together" (a hit for former R&B singer Robert Knight) served as a non-charting B-side to a Monument single that is not featured on this collection.

"Sergeant Preston of the Yukon" and "Everybody Needs a Rainbow" were transferred to this CD from an LP disc due to unavailability of a tape source.

The album received a three-star rating out of four in a review in the Fort Myers News-Press.

== Track listing ==
No.	Title	Writer(s)	Length
1.	"Sergeant Preston of the Yukon"	Ray Stevens	2:59
2.	"Ahab the Arab"	Ray Stevens	3:43
3.	"Harry the Hairy Ape"	Ray Stevens	3:13
4.	"Funny Man"	Ray Stevens	3:02
5.	"Freddie Feelgood (And His Funky Little Five Piece Band)"	Ray Stevens	2:39
6.	"Unwind"	Ray Stevens	3:08
7.	"Mr. Businessman"	Ray Stevens	3:23
8.	"Isn't It Lonely Together"	Ray Stevens	3:13
9.	"Gitarzan"	Ray Stevens, Bill Everette	3:16
10.	"Along Came Jones"	Jerry Leiber, Mike Stoller	3:47
11.	"Sunday Mornin' Comin' Down"	Kris Kristofferson	4:28
12.	"Have a Little Talk With Myself"	Ray Stevens	3:04
13.	"Everything Is Beautiful"	Ray Stevens	3:31
14.	"America, Communicate With Me"	Ray Stevens	3:13
15.	"Bridget the Midget (The Queen of the Blues)"	Ray Stevens	3:39
16.	"All My Trials"	Ray Stevens, arr.	3:00
17.	"Turn Your Radio On"	Albert E. Brumley	2:13
18.	"Nashville"	Ray Stevens	3:08
19.	"The Streak"	Ray Stevens	3:18
20.	"Everybody Needs a Rainbow"	Layng Martine Jr.	3:19
21.	"Misty"	Erroll Garner, Johnny Burke	2:56
22.	"Indian Love Call"	Rudolph Friml, Otto Harbach, Oscar Hammerstein II	3:32
23.	"Young Love"	Carole Joyner, Ric Cartey	3:48

== Album credits ==
- Collection Produced by: Cary E. Mansfield
- 24-bit Mastering by: Evren Göknar and Marty Wekser at Capitol Mastering, Hollywood, CA
- Notes by: Brian Mansfield
- Art Direction & Design by: Bill Pitzonka
- Photos courtesy of Showtime Music Archive
- Special thanks to Ray Stevens, Dick Bartley, Dave Booth, Marty Boratyn, Bryon Davis, Pat Downey, Kevin Elliott, Brian Giorgi, Pete Howard, Bill Inglot, Melanie Jones, Kapsner, Steve Knapp, Steve Kolanjian, Paul Lichtenstein, Karina Lope, Kim Mansfield, Stephanie J. Mansfield, Steve Massie, Paul C. Mawhinney (Record-Rama Sound Archives, Pittsburgh, PA, www.recordrama.com), Andy McKaie, Jerry Osborne, Mike Palesh, Clay Pasternack, Mike Ragogna, Jerry Reuss, Dan Richardson and Shirley WelchCompiled from liner notes.
