= Big Brovaz =

British rhythm & blues group

- Origin: London, England
- Genres: R&B; hip hop
- Years active: 2001–2004; 2007; 2012–present
- Labels: Riot Records; Sony/Epic; RAF/Genetic
- Spinoffs: Booty Luv
- Members: Cherise; Nadia Shepherd; John Paul Horsley (J-Rock); Michael Brown (Randy)
- Past members: Dion Howell; Temi Tayo Aisida (Flawless); Skillz

Big Brovaz (pronounced as "brothers") are an R&B and hip hop music group from London, England. In their seven-year career they released two studio albums and eight singles. There were three line-up changes with two of the original members leaving halfway through. In 2006, the only two female members launched their own band Booty Luv, which was taking off following the success of their debut single "Boogie 2nite". After their second album failed to chart and with low sales of their last two singles, the band decided to split. In May 2012, the four members from the third line-up reformed and toured Australia with S Club 3.

== History ==
=== 2001–2002: Formation, original lineup and Look Inside ===
Big Brovaz originally comprised three women (Cherise, who won the MOBO for best unsigned artist in 2000; Dion; and Nadia, born in Reading), three men (J-Rock; Flawless, born in Lagos; and Randy), plus two producers Skillz (also known as JJC, born in Kano, who also managed his group 419 Squad), and Michael Fingaz Mugisha. The group was referred to as a softer version of the So Solid Crew.

The group was brought together by Fingaz, one of the collective's producers, who already worked under the title "Big Brovaz". The "Big Brovaz" team asked the individual members to showcase their talent alongside underground London R&B and hip hop artists on a compilation that was being put together, entitled Big Brovaz – Watching You. On the album, rather than giving each member an individual track, the producers decided to make the artists work together and perform on the same tracks. That collaborative effort led to the group's formation.

The Big Brovaz – Watching You compilation sold over two thousand copies.

A track from the album, which featured west London R&B singer Cherise, was picked up by the organizer of the annual MOBO award and she was asked to compete in the annual MOBO Unsigned talent competition where she achieved first place. Cherise was signed and later release her own solo album. Following this, the group was picked up by Sony Records.

Female member Cherise released a solo album Look Inside before the debut album from Big Brovaz was released. It only spawned one single, "2nd Best", while the album won a MOBO award.

=== 2002–2004: Commercial breakthrough and Nu Flow ===
The group's breakthrough was in October 2002 when the group's debut single, "Nu Flow" became a hit, particularly in the UK where it made the top 3, spending over four months inside the top 75. Their debut album of the same name was released on 4 November 2002 to rave reviews. This single was covered in 2006 in a UK Halifax TV advertisement.

The group's success continued into 2003 with the release of further singles from their debut album. The group's second single, "OK" made Number 7 in the UK Singles Chart prompting a re-release of the album with a re-ordered track listing and new tracks on 10 February 2003. However, the album was re-issued yet again one month later, on 24 March 2003, with another re-ordered track listing and a new track entitled "Favourite Things". This song became the group's third single and was famous for sampling the song "My Favourite Things" from the musical The Sound of Music. As well as their own interpretation of the classic song, the group decided to include a cover of the original as a hidden bonus track on version three of "Nu Flow". "Favourite Things" became the group's biggest highest-charting hit to date, peaking at Number 2 in the UK Singles Chart and spending three weeks inside the top 3 of that chart.

The fourth single taken from the album was "Baby Boy". The music video for the single was famous for being inspired by the sitcom Friends. "Baby Boy" became the group's fourth top 10 hit in a row, peaking at Number 4 in the UK singles chart. The fifth single from the album, "Ain't What You Do", which sampled Fun Boy Three and Bananarama's collaboration It Ain't What You Do (It's the Way That You Do It) was the group's fifth top 15 hit, peaking at Number 15.

The group's debut album was certified platinum in the UK, a great achievement for UK R&B and hip hop.

The group next appeared on-screen in the 2004 film Scooby-Doo 2: Monsters Unleashed, in which they performed a version of Sly & the Family Stone's "Thank You (Falettinme Be Mice Elf Agin)" and was featured on the Soundtrack. They also released the single "We Wanna Thank You (The Things You Do)" as the theme song from the movie in April 2004. This was the collective's smallest hit to date, peaking at Number 17 in the UK singles charts. Shortly after this, rapper Flawless was stopped at LAX airport and was found to be in possession of about 2.2 grams (0.078 ounces) of Cannabis out of the UK. This resulted in his sacking from the group in 2004, leaving the remaining 5 group members and two producers to carry on without him.

=== 2004–2007: third line up, Re Entry and split ===
Later in 2004, one member down, the group released another new single, "Yours Fatally", which was due to be taken from their second album. Although receiving good reviews, the single did not catch on as much as their record company had hoped and were subsequently dropped by their label due to poor sales in late 2004. After being dropped, the group decided to split up and pursue solo ventures. The reformed group's MySpace webpage confirmed that a new single would be released 24 April entitled "Hangin' Around", which became the group's lowest charting hit to date, peaking outside the UK top 40.

Despite this setback, the group continued and they announced that their second album "Re-Entry" (originally due for a May release) would finally be released in early 2007. The third single from the album (as "Yours Fatally" was to be included), confirmed as "Big Bro Thang", was announced to have a release before the album. The single "Big Bro Thang" was released with six remixes launching on iTunes between 26 February 2007 and 19 March, with the album Re-Entry finally released on 9 April 2007. The group entered "Big Bro Thang" into Making Your Mind Up 2007, the UK's national selection for the Eurovision Song Contest 2007

=== 2012-present: Reformation, touring and new material ===
In May 2012, the four remaining original members of the band set off on a tour of Australia with three members of pop group S Club 7. On 14 September 2014 the group released their first single since reforming independently. In October and December 2018, the band joined with Peter Andre, 5ive, S Club 3, Boyzlife (Keith Duffy and Shane Lynch), B*Witched, Blazin' Squad and East 17, for a 5-date revival arena tour. Cherise and Nadia also performed as Booty Luv.

On 25 September 2021 the group released "Controlla". This was the first release by the group that did not feature vocals from the female members of the band.

== Solo careers ==
Nadia and Cherise are now also performing under the name Booty Luv. Their first single, a cover of Tweet's "Boogie 2nite" was released in the UK via the Hed Kandi label on 27 November 2006. The single received good reviews and became a favourite on the UK club scene. It peaked at Number 2 in its third week in the UK Singles Chart, spending eleven weeks in the Top 15 and sixteen weeks in the Top 40.

Four more singles have since been released, with Shine, a cover of the Luther Vandross song, peaking at Number 10 in the UK singles chart. Third and fourth singles "Don't Mess with My Man", a cover of the Lucy Pearl song, and an original song "Some Kinda Rush" both reached the Top 20, peaking at number 11 and 19. "Dance Dance" was the fifth single to be taken from the album. Booty Luv's début album Boogie 2nite was released on 17 September 2007, and reached number 11 in the UK Albums Chart.

J-Rock and Randy also went on to form their own group, Party Dark, falling into the Party/House and Rap genres and were signed to Champion Records in 2009. On 15 March 2010 they released their first single, "Is That You?", which was well received by DJs such as Huw Stephens, Bobby Friction and Eddie Temple-Morris and the music video reached Number 1 in the MTV Dancefloor Charts four weeks in a row.

Party Dark released a second single in the later part of 2010 called "Let's Go". This was announced via a teaser trailer on YouTube and a remix competition on their own and their label's websites.

J-Rock was the protagonist of an All 4 documentary entitled Giving Up the Weed.

== Discography ==
=== Albums ===
Title	Details	Peak chart positions							Certifications (sales thresholds)
Title	Details	UK	AUS	BEL	NZ	NL	SWE	TUR	Certifications (sales thresholds)
Nu-Flow	Released: 4 November 2002; Labels : Sony Music / Epic	6	37	45	31	56	53	44	BPI: Platinum
Re-Entry	Released: 9 April 2007; Label: RAF / Genetic	—	—	—	—	—	—	—	

=== Singles ===
Title	Year	Chart positions							Certification	Album
Title	Year	UK	AUS	BEL	NZ	NL	SWE	TUR	Certification	Album
"Nu Flow"	2002	3	3	2	1	2	2	2	ARIA: Platinum; BPI: Silver	Nu-Flow
"OK"	2003	7	64	24	—	37	40	44		Nu-Flow
"Favourite Things"	2003	2	3	17	3	76	47	51	ARIA: Gold; BPI: Silver	Nu-Flow
"Baby Boy"	2003	4	8	29	13	—	—	58	ARIA: Platinum; BPI: Silver	Nu-Flow
"Ain't What You Do"	2003	15	—	—	—	—	—	—		Nu-Flow
"We Wanna Thank You (The Things You Do)"	2004	17	56	—	—	—	—	—		Scooby-Doo 2: Monsters Unleashed OST
"Thank You (Falettinme Be Mice Elf Agin)"	2004	—	—	48	—	—	—	—		Scooby-Doo 2: Monsters Unleashed OST
"Yours Fatally"	2004	15	—	—	—	—	—	—		Re-Entry
"Hangin' Around"	2006	57	—	—	—	—	—	—		Re-Entry
"Big Bro Thang"	2007	171	—	—	—	—	—	—		Re-Entry
"Here Comes The Sun"	2014	—	—	—	—	—	—	—		Non-album singles
"Controlla (feat Bradley McIntosh)"	2021	—	—	—	—	—	—	—		Non-album singles

=== Filmography ===
- Scooby-Doo 2: Monsters Unleashed (2004)
