= Nu-Flow =

Studio album by Big Brovaz
- Released: 4 November 2002
- Studios: Dairy (Brixton, England)
- Genres: R&B; hip hop
- Length: 61:20
- Labels: Riot; Sony/Epic
- Producers: Jay Dee; Jonathan Shalit; B.J.; Fingaz; Skillz; Mike Soul

Big Brovaz chronology
Nu-Flow (2002)	Re-Entry (2007)

Singles from Nu-Flow
- 1. "Nu Flow" Released: 14 October 2002; 2. "OK" Released: 10 February 2003; 3. "Favourite Things" Released: 5 May 2003; 4. "Baby Boy" Released: 1 September 2003; 5. "Ain't What You Do" Released: 8 December 2003

Alternative cover
- Album cover for version one of Nu Flow

Nu-Flow is the debut studio album by British R&B/hip hop group Big Brovaz, originally released on 4 November 2002. The album features five singles, of which four were UK top-10 singles—the title track "Nu Flow", which was a hit across Europe; "OK"; "Favourite Things" (the highest charting hit from the album) and "Baby Boy". The fifth single from the album was "Ain't What You Do", which peaked at number 15. The album peaked at number 6 on the UK Albums Chart and has been certified double platinum by the BPI.

== Track listing ==
Version 1:

1. "Nu Flow"
2. "Find a Way"
3. "Taking It Global"
4. "Summertime"
5. "Gotta Get"
6. "OK" (full version)
7. "Little Mama"
8. "Don't Watch That"
9. "Baby Boy"
10. "Don't Matter"
11. "I Know You're There"

Version 2:

1. "Nu Flow" 3:22
2. "Gotta Get" 3:26
3. "Don't Matter" 4:51
4. "Baby Boy" 3:59
5. "Ain't What You Do" 3:42
6. "OK" (radio edit) 3:44
7. "I Know You're There" 4:06
8. "Taking It Global" 3:47
9. "Summertime" 3:51
10. "Find a Way" 3:35
11. "Little Mamma" 4:10
12. "This Music" 3:31
13. "Don't Watch That" 3:45
14. "OK" (Rock Remix)

Bonus videos:

- "Nu Flow"
- "OK"

Version 3:

1. "Nu Flow"
2. "Gotta Get"
3. "Don't Matter"
4. "Baby Boy"
5. "Favourite Things"
6. "OK" (radio edit)
7. "I Know You're There"
8. "Taking It Global"
9. "Summertime"
10. "Find a Way"
11. "Little Mamma"
12. "This Music"
13. "Ain't What You Do"
14. "Don't Watch That"
15. "OK" (rock remix)
16. "My Favourite Things" (hidden track)

Bonus videos:

- "Nu Flow"
- "OK"

Version 4: Australian Limited Edition with bonus DVD

1. "Nu Flow"
2. "Gotta Get"
3. "Don't Matter"
4. "Baby Boy"
5. "Favourite Things"
6. "OK" (radio edit)
7. "I Know You're There"
8. "Taking It Global"
9. "Summertime"
10. "Find a Way"
11. "Little Mamma"
12. "This Music"
13. "Ain't What You Do"
14. "Don't Watch That"
15. "We Wanna Thank You"

Bonus DVD:

- "Nu Flow"
- "Favourite Things"
- "OK"
- "Baby Boy"
- "Ain't What You Do"

== Charts ==
=== Weekly charts ===
Weekly chart performance for Nu-Flow
Chart (2002–2003)	Peak position
Australian Albums (ARIA)	37
Belgian Albums (Ultratop Flanders)	45
Dutch Albums (Album Top 100)	56
Irish Albums (IRMA)	69
New Zealand Albums (RMNZ)	31
Norwegian Albums (VG-lista)	15
Scottish Albums (Official Charts)	13
Swedish Albums (Sverigetopplistan)	53
UK Albums (Official Charts)	6
UK R&B Albums (Official Charts)	4

=== Year-end charts ===
Year-end chart performance for Nu-Flow
Chart (2003)	Position
UK Albums (OCC)	42

== Certifications ==
Region	Certification	Certified units/sales
United Kingdom (BPI)	Platinum	300,000^{^}
^{^} Shipments figures based on certification alone.
