= Just Another Way to Say I Love You =

Studio album by Barry White
- Released: March 25, 1975
- Recorded: 1974–1975
- Genre: R&B, soul, disco
- Length: 39:21
- Label: 20th Century
- Producer: Barry White

Barry White chronology
Can't Get Enough (1974)	Just Another Way to Say I Love You (1975)	Barry White's Greatest Hits (1975)

Singles from Just Another Way to Say I Love You
- 1. "What Am I Gonna Do with You" Released: February 1975; 2. "I'll Do for You Anything You Want Me To" Released: May 1975

Professional ratings
Review scores
Source	Rating
AllMusic	3/5 stars
Christgau's Record Guide	C+

Just Another Way to Say I Love You is the self-produced fourth album by American R&B singer Barry White, released in 1975 on the 20th Century label.

== History ==
The album topped the R&B albums chart, White's fourth in a row to do so, and peaked at No. 17 on the Billboard 200. It also reached No. 12 on the UK Albums Chart. The album was a success, yielding two Billboard R&B Top Ten singles, "What Am I Gonna Do with You", which peaked at No. 1, and "I'll Do for You Anything You Want Me To", which peaked at No. 4. Both were also successful on the Billboard Hot 100, peaking at No. 8 and No. 40 respectively. Both singles were also hits on the UK Singles Chart, peaking at No. 5 and No. 20 respectively. The album was digitally remastered and reissued on CD on July 31, 2006, by UMVD Special Markets.

== Track listing ==
All tracks are written by Barry White, except where noted.

Side one
No.	Title	Writer(s)	Length
1.	"Heavenly, That's What You Are to Me"		5:03
2.	"I'll Do for You Anything You Want Me To"		6:13
3.	"All Because of You"	Barry White, Frank Wilson, Michael Nunes	6:40
4.	"Love Serenade (Part I)"		4:49

Side two
No.	Title	Length
1.	"What Am I Gonna Do with You"	3:30
2.	"Let Me Live My Life Lovin' You Babe"	10:29
3.	"Love Serenade (Part II)"	3:13

== Personnel ==
- Barry White - lead vocals, arranger
- Gene Page - orchestra conductor, arranger

Technical

- Frank Kejmar - engineer
- Eddie Douglas, Jack Levy - art direction, design

== Charts ==
=== Weekly charts ===
Chart (1975)	Peak
Australia (Kent Music Report)	54
U.S. Billboard Top LPs	17
U.S. Billboard Top Soul LPs	1
UK Albums Chart	12

=== Year-end charts ===
Chart (1975)	Position
German Albums (Offizielle Top 100)	43

Singles

Year	Single	Peak chart positions		
Year	Single	US	US R&B	UK
1975	"What Am I Gonna Do with You"	8	1	5
1975	"I'll Do for You Anything You Want Me To"	40	4	20

== Certifications and sales ==
Region	Certification	Certified units/sales
United Kingdom (BPI)	Silver	60,000^{^}
^{^} Shipments figures based on certification alone.

== See also ==
- List of number-one R&B albums of 1975 (U.S.)
