= In the Round (TV program) =

Canadian music television program

- Genre: Variety
- Presented by: Mike Neun
- Country of origin: Canada
- Original language: English
- No. of seasons: 1
- No. of episodes: 10

Production
- Producer: Ken Gibson
- Running time: 30 minutes

Original release
- Network: CBC Television
- Release: 19 April – 28 June 1970

In the Round is a Canadian music variety show that aired on CBC Television in 1970.

== Premise ==
This Vancouver-produced music program featured regulars Mike Neun, Carol Hunter and the Doug Parker Quartet. As the program's title suggests, the hosts and their guests were arranged in a circular pattern in the studio.

== Scheduling ==
This half-hour program was broadcast on Sundays at 2:00 p.m. (Eastern) from 19 April to 28 June 1970.
