= Nu Flow =

2002 single by Big Brovaz

Single by Big Brovaz

from the album Nu-Flow
- Released: 14 October 2002
- Studio: Dairy (Brixton, England)
- Length: 3:21
- Label: Epic; Daylight
- Songwriters: Michael Mugiisha; John Paul Horsley; Tayo Aisida; Cherise Roberts; Nadia Shepherd; Dion Howell; Dean Macintosh; Abdul Bella; Michael Brown
- Producers: Skillz and Fingaz

Big Brovaz singles chronology
"Nu Flow" (2002)	"OK" (2003)

"Nu Flow" is the debut single of British R&B collective Big Brovaz. It was released as the first single from their debut album, Nu-Flow (2002), on 14 October 2002. "Nu Flow" peaked at number three on the UK Singles Chart and spent 19 weeks inside the UK top 100. The single was also successful in New Zealand and Norway, where it reached number one, and in Australia, where it peaked at number three to become their joint-highest-peaking hit, along with "Favourite Things".

== Music video ==
The accompanying music video was directed by Vaughan Arnell.

== Track listings ==
UK CD1

1. "Nu Flow" (original clean radio edit)
2. "Nu Flow" (Blacksmith club rub)
3. "Nu Flow" (Shy FX and T Power remix)
4. "Nu Flow" (video)

UK CD2

1. "Nu Flow" (original)
2. "Nu Flow" (Marley Marl main mix)
3. "Nu Flow" (Fusion remix)

UK 12-inch single

A1. "Nu Flow" (Blacksmith club rub)
A2. "Nu Flow" (original)
B1. "Nu Flow" (Fusion remix)
B2. "Nu Flow" (Marley Marl main mix)

UK cassette single

1. "Nu Flow" (original clean radio edit)
2. "Nu Flow" (Marley Marl main mix)

European CD single

1. "Nu Flow" (original clean radio edit)
2. "Nu Flow" (Blacksmith club rub)

Australian CD single

1. "Nu Flow" (clean radio edit)
2. "Nu Flow" (Marley Marl main mix)
3. "Nu Flow" (Shy FX & T Power remix)
4. "Nu Flow" (Blacksmith club rub)

== Credits and personnel ==
Credits are taken from the UK CD1 liner notes.

Studio

- Recorded at Dairy Studios (Brixton, England)

Personnel

- Michael Mugiisha – writing
- John Paul Horsley – writing
- Tayo Aisida – writing
- Cherise Roberts – writing
- Nadia Shepherd – writing
- Dion Howell – writing
- Dean Macintosh – writing
- Abdul Bella – writing
- Michael Brown – writing
- Big Brovaz – vocals
- Skillz and Fingaz – production
- Roy Merchant – mixing

== Charts ==
=== Weekly charts ===
Chart (2002–2003)	Peak position
Australia (ARIA)	3
Australian Urban (ARIA)	1
Belgium (Ultratop 50 Flanders)	2
Belgium (Ultratop 50 Wallonia)	19
Denmark (Tracklisten)	3
Europe (Eurochart Hot 100)	14
Finland (Suomen virallinen lista)	20
Germany (GfK)	33
Hungary (Editors' Choice Top 40)	25
Ireland (IRMA)	6
Netherlands (Dutch Top 40)	2
Netherlands (Single Top 100)	2
New Zealand (Recorded Music NZ)	1
Norway (VG-lista)	1
Romania (Romanian Top 100)	34
Scottish Singles Sales (Official Charts)	3
Sweden (Sverigetopplistan)	2
Switzerland (Schweizer Hitparade)	32
UK Singles (Official Charts)	3
UK Hip Hop/R&B (Official Charts)	2

=== Year-end charts ===
Chart (2002)	Position
Ireland (IRMA)	51
UK Singles (OCC)	29
UK Airplay (Music Week)	68

Chart (2003)	Position
Australia (ARIA)	9
Australian Urban (ARIA)	4
Belgium (Ultratop 50 Flanders)	14
Belgium (Ultratop 50 Wallonia)	76
Netherlands (Dutch Top 40)	11
Netherlands (Single Top 100)	16
New Zealand (RIANZ)	23
Sweden (Hitlistan)	19

== Certifications ==
Region	Certification	Certified units/sales
Australia (ARIA)	Platinum	70,000^{^}
Belgium (BRMA)	Gold	25,000^{*}
New Zealand (RMNZ)	Gold	5,000^{*}
Norway (IFPI Norway)	Platinum	10,000^{*}
Sweden (GLF)	Gold	15,000^{^}
United Kingdom (BPI)	Silver	200,000^{^}
^{*} Sales figures based on certification alone.^{^} Shipments figures based on certification alone.

== Release history ==
Region	Date	Format(s)	Label(s)	Ref.
United Kingdom	14 October 2002	12-inch vinyl; CD; cassette	Epic; Daylight	
Australia	13 January 2003	CD	Epic; Daylight	
