= It's Ecstasy When You Lay Down Next to Me =

- German release picture sleeve

Single by Barry White

from the album Barry White Sings for Someone You Love
- B-side: "I Never Thought I'd Fall In Love With You"
- Released: August 1977
- Genre: Soul, funk, R&B, disco
- Length: 6:57 (album version); 3:27 (single edit)
- Label: 20th Century
- Songwriter(s): Ekundayo Paris, Nelson Pigford
- Producer(s): Barry White

Barry White singles chronology
"I'm Qualified to Satisfy You" (1977)	"It's Ecstasy When You Lay Down Next to Me" (1977)	"Playing Your Game, Baby" (1977)

"It's Ecstasy When You Lay Down Next to Me" is a hit song by American singer Barry White. The song was written by Ekundayo Paris and Nelson Pigford, and arranged by Barry White. The track was also sampled in Robbie Williams' 2001 UK #1 hit, "Rock DJ".

== Chart performance ==
Released from his album Barry White Sings for Someone You Love. The song spent five weeks at the top (#1) of the R&B singles charts during the fall of 1977, and was also a big hit on the pop charts, peaking at number four on the Billboard Hot 100 singles chart, and was his sixth and last top ten hit.

Chart (1977)	Peak position
UK Singles (Official Charts Company)	40
US Billboard Hot 100	4
US Billboard National Disco Action Top 40	5
US Billboard Hot Soul Singles	1
