= What Am I Gonna Do with You =

Single by Barry White

from the album Just Another Way to Say I Love You
- B-side: "What Am I Gonna Do With You Baby"
- Released: February 1975
- Recorded: 1974
- Genre: R&B, disco
- Length: 3:36
- Label: 20th Century Records
- Songwriter: Barry White
- Producer: Barry White

Barry White singles chronology
"You're the First, the Last, My Everything" (1974)	"What Am I Gonna Do with You" (1975)	"I'll Do for You Anything You Want Me To" (1975)

"What Am I Gonna Do with You" is a popular song recorded by Barry White. Written and produced by White, the song was his fifth top ten hit on the Billboard Hot 100 singles chart in the US, reaching number eight and spending a week at number one on the Billboard Hot Soul Singles chart during spring 1975. In the UK, it peaked at number five on the UK Singles Chart. It appeared on White's 1975 album, Just Another Way to Say I Love You.

== Charts ==
Chart (1975)	Peak position
Austria (Ö3 Austria Top 40)	11
Belgium (Ultratop 50 Flanders)	15
Canada Top Singles (RPM)	23
Germany (Official German Charts)	17
Netherlands (Single Top 100)	19
UK Singles (Official Charts)	5
US Billboard Hot 100	8
US Hot Soul Singles (Billboard)	1
