= You're the First, the Last, My Everything =

- Side A of the Irish single

Single by Barry White

from the album Can't Get Enough
- B-side: "More Than Anything, You're My Everything"
- Released: October 25, 1974 (UK)
- Recorded: 1974
- Genre: Philadelphia soul
- Length: 4:33; 3:30 (7" version)
- Label: 20th Century
- Songwriters: Peter Radcliffe, Tony Sepe, Barry White
- Producer: Barry White

Barry White singles chronology
"Can't Get Enough of Your Love, Babe" (1974)	"You're the First, the Last, My Everything" (1974)	"What Am I Gonna Do with You" (1975)

"You're the First, the Last, My Everything" is a song recorded by the American singer and songwriter Barry White from his third album, Can't Get Enough (1974). The song was written by White, Tony Sepe and Peter Radcliffe and produced by White. It reached number 2 on the US Billboard Hot 100 and number 1 on the UK Singles Chart. The song was certified Gold by the Recording Industry Association of America (RIAA) in 1974, and certified Silver by the British Phonographic Industry (BPI), also in 1974.

== Background ==
Peter Radcliffe originally wrote the track as a country song with the title "You're My First, You're My Last, My In-Between", which went unrecorded for 21 years. White recorded it as a disco song, retaining most of the musical structure while rewriting the lyrics.

== Chart performance ==
"You're the First, the Last, My Everything" was White's fourth top ten hit on the US Billboard Hot 100 singles chart, reaching number 2. It spent a week at number 1 on the Billboard Hot Soul Singles chart. The track made it to number 2 on the disco/dance charts. On the UK Singles Chart it fared even better, spending two weeks at the top in December 1974.

== Charts ==
=== Weekly charts ===
Chart (1974–1975)	Peak position
Belgium (Ultratop 50 Flanders)	6
Canada Top Singles (RPM)	8
Finland (Suomen virallinen lista)	15
Ireland (IRMA)	6
Netherlands (Dutch Top 40)	10
Netherlands (Single Top 100)	13
South Africa (Springbok)	2
UK Singles (Official Charts)	1
US Billboard Hot 100	2
US Hot R&B/Hip-Hop Songs (Billboard)	1
US Dance Club Songs (Billboard)	2
US Cash Box Top 100	1
West Germany (GfK)	9

Chart (2022)	Peak position
Hungary (Single Top 40)	39

=== Year-end charts ===
Chart (1974)	Rank
Canada	137
UK Singles	32

Chart (1975)	Rank
US Billboard Hot 100	48
US Cash Box Top 100	31

== Certifications ==
"You're the First, the Last, My Everything" was certified Gold by the RIAA on December 18, 1974. It was certified silver for 200,000 sold copies in United Kingdom in 1974.

Region	Certification	Certified units/sales
Denmark (IFPI Danmark)	Gold	45,000^{‡}
Italy (FIMI) sales since 2009	Gold	35,000^{‡}
Spain (Promusicae)	Platinum	60,000^{‡}
United Kingdom (BPI)	Platinum	600,000^{‡}
United States (RIAA)	Gold	1,000,000^{^}
^{^} Shipments figures based on certification alone.^{‡} Sales+streaming figures based on certification alone.

== Well-known cover versions ==
A cover version of the song performed by Howard Brown was released in March 2005 in the UK as a charity single. It peaked at No. 13 on the UK singles chart. Prior to its release, it had been adapted for a popular television commercial for Halifax Bank in which Brown could be seen singing and dancing.
