= Lisa Stansfield discography =

Catalogue of published recordings by Lisa Stansfield

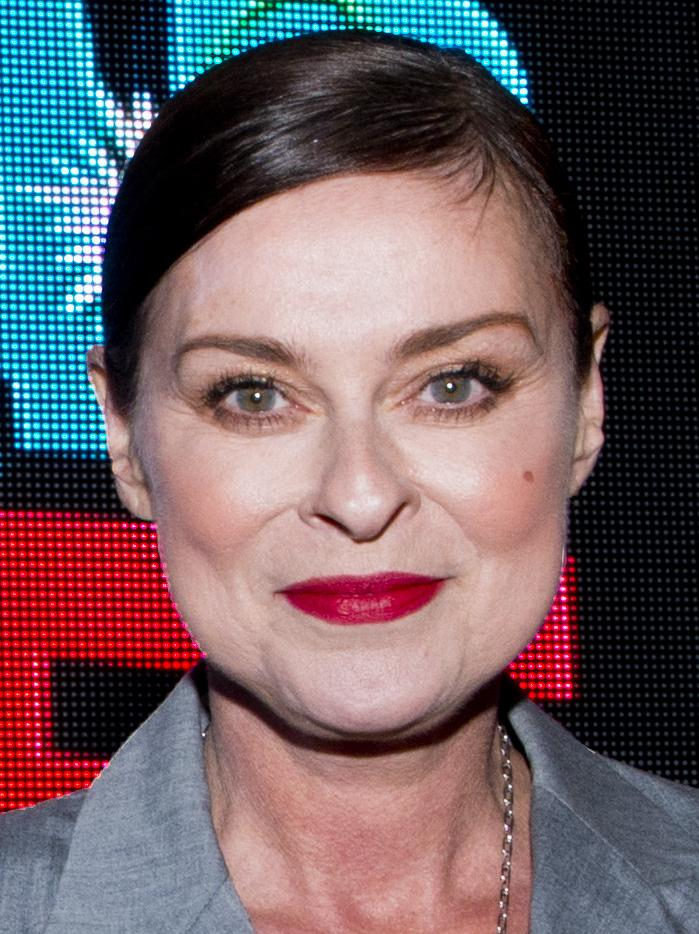
- Studio albums: 8
- Extended plays: 1
- Soundtrack albums: 1
- Compilation albums: 4
- Singles: 44
- Video albums: 5
- Music videos: 33
- Remix albums: 3

British singer and songwriter Lisa Stansfield has released eight solo studio albums and one with her band Blue Zone, four compilation albums, three remix albums, one soundtrack album, one extended play and forty-four singles. As of 2004, Stansfield has sold over 20 million records worldwide, including 5 million of Affection.

Her biggest hits include "People Hold On", "This Is the Right Time", "All Around the World", "Live Together", "What Did I Do to You?", "Change", "All Woman", "Time to Make You Mine", "Set Your Loving Free", "Someday (I'm Coming Back)", "In All the Right Places", "The Real Thing" and "Never, Never Gonna Give You Up". Stansfield released her latest studio album titled Deeper on 6 April 2018.

== Albums ==
=== Studio albums ===
Title	Album details	Peak chart positions										Certifications
Title	Album details	UK	AUS	AUT	BEL	GER	ITA	JAP	SPA	SWI	US	Certifications
Affection	Released: 20 November 1989; Label: Arista; Formats: CD, LP, cassette	2	7	1	3	2	2	96	2	2	9	AUS: Gold; AUT: Gold; FRA: Gold; GER: Platinum; SPA: Platinum; SWI: Platinum; UK: 3× Platinum; US: Platinum
Real Love	Released: 11 November 1991; Label: Arista; Formats: CD, LP, cassette	3	40	21	10	9	10	38	41	18	43	GER: Gold; SWI: Gold; UK: 2× Platinum; US: Gold
So Natural	Released: 8 November 1993; Label: Arista; Formats: CD, LP, cassette	6	67	30	—	25	14	50	—	27	—	UK: Platinum
Lisa Stansfield	Released: 21 March 1997; Label: Arista; Formats: CD, cassette	2	41	12	6	13	8	40	23	11	55	SPA: Gold; SWI: Gold; UK: Gold
Face Up	Released: 20 June 2001; Label: Arista; Formats: CD, cassette	38	—	26	—	29	—	86	—	19	—	
The Moment	Released: 27 September 2004; Label: ZTT; Formats: CD	57	—	15	90	16	57	—	70	22	—	GER: Gold
Seven	Released: 31 January 2014; Label: Monkeynatra, Edel; Formats: CD, digital download	13	—	25	111	13	—	—	—	42	—	
Deeper	Released: 6 April 2018; Label: earMUSIC; Formats: CD, LP, digital download	15	—	11	127	7	—	—	93	23	—	
"—" denotes releases that did not chart or were not released.

=== Live albums ===
Title	Album details	Peak chart positions
Title	Album details	ITA
Live in Manchester	Released: 28 August 2015; Label: earMUSIC; Formats: 2CD, digital download	15

=== Compilation albums ===
Title	Album details	Peak chart positions							Certifications
Title	Album details	UK	BEL	EU	GER	ITA	SPA	SWI	Certifications
In Session	Released: 20 September 1996; Label: Sovereign Music; Formats: CD	—	—	—	—	—	—	—	
Biography: The Greatest Hits	Released: 3 February 2003; Label: Arista; Formats: CD, cassette	3	37	16	46	4	43	58	UK: Gold
The Complete Collection	Released: 2 June 2003; Label: Arista; Formats: 6CD	—	—	—	—	—	—	—	
The Collection 1989–2003	Released: 10 November 2014; Label: Edsel; Formats: 13CD+5DVD	—	—	—	—	—	—	—	
"—" denotes releases that did not chart or were not released.

=== Remix albums ===
Title	Album details
The Remix Album	Released: 2 June 1998; Label: Arista; Formats: CD, LP
Seven+	Released: 20 October 2014; Label: Monkeynatra, Edel; Formats: CD, digital download
People Hold On ... The Remix Anthology	Released: 10 November 2014; Label: Edsel; Formats: 3CD
Deeper+	Released: 26 October 2018; Label: earMUSIC; Formats: digital download

=== Soundtrack albums ===
Title	Album details	Peak chart positions
Title	Album details	UK
Swing	Released: 10 May 1999; Label: BMG Soundtracks; Formats: CD, cassette	165

== Extended plays ==
Title	EP details	Peak chart positions											Certifications
Title	EP details	UK	AUS	AUT	BEL	EU	GER	ITA	JAP	SPA	SWI	US	Certifications
Five Live (with George Michael and Queen)	Released: 19 April 1993; Label: Parlophone; Formats: CD, LP, cassette	1	17	2	3	5	8	6	35	18	6	46	AUT: Gold; FRA: Gold; GER: Gold; SWI: Gold; UK: Gold

== Singles ==
Year	Title	Peak chart positions										Certifications	Album
Year	Title	UK	AUS	AUT	BEL	GER	IRE	NLD	US	US Dance	US R&B	Certifications	Album
1981	"Your Alibis"	—	—	—	—	—	—	—	—	—	—		—N/a
1982	"The Only Way"	—	—	—	—	—	—	—	—	—	—		—N/a
1983	"Listen to Your Heart"	—	—	—	—	—	—	—	—	—	—		—N/a
1983	"I Got a Feeling"	—	—	—	—	—	—	—	—	—	—		—N/a
1989	"People Hold On" (with Coldcut)	11	78	—	32	24	—	37	—	6	—		What's That Noise?
1989	"My Telephone" (with Coldcut)	52	—	—	—	62	—	—	—	—	—		What's That Noise?
1989	"This Is the Right Time"	13	138	20	—	17	—	—	21 (Note: Charted in 1990 after the success of "All Around The World")	1	13		Affection
1989	"All Around the World"	1	9	1	1	2	3	1	3	1	1	AUS: Gold; AUT: Gold; GER: Gold; SWE: Gold; UK: Gold; US: Platinum	Affection
1989	"Do They Know It's Christmas?" (Band Aid II)	1	30	—	17	74	1	18	—	—	—	UK: Platinum	—N/a
1990	"Live Together"	10	62	30	7	23	11	5	—	—	—		Affection
1990	"What Did I Do to You?"	25	—	—	37	43	20	38	—	—	—		Affection
1990	"You Can't Deny It"	—	—	—	—	—	—	—	14	2	1		Affection
1991	"Change"	10	21	24	6	13	17	7	27	1	12		Real Love
1991	"All Woman"	20	52	—	28	—	—	21	56	—	1		Real Love
1992	"Time to Make You Mine"	14	114	—	47	—	—	47	—	—	—		Real Love
1992	"Everything Will Get Better"	—	—	—	—	—	—	—	—	36	—		—N/a
1992	"Set Your Loving Free"	28	164	—	—	42	—	36	—	20	—		Real Love
1992	"A Little More Love"	—	—	—	—	—	—	—	—	—	30		Real Love
1992	"Someday (I'm Coming Back)"	10	116	—	39	51	16	30	—	—	—		The Bodyguard: Original Soundtrack Album
1993	"In All the Right Places"	8	132	—	—	63	8	20	—	—	—		So Natural
1993	"So Natural"	15	69	—	—	67	—	47	—	—	—		So Natural
1993	"Little Bit of Heaven"	32	153	—	—	54	—	—	—	—	—		So Natural
1994	"Marvellous & Mine"	—	—	—	—	—	—	—	—	—	—		So Natural
1994	"Make It Right"	—	—	—	—	—	—	—	—	46	64		Beverly Hills 90210
1994	"Dream Away" (with Babyface)	—	193	—	—	—	—	—	— (Note: "Dream Away" did not enter the US Billboard Hot 100, but peaked at number 9 on the Bubbling Under Hot 100 Singles chart.)	—	80		The Pagemaster: Original Motion Picture Soundtrack
1997	"People Hold On" (The Bootleg Mixes)	4	89	—	40	—	15	71	—	1	—	UK: Silver	Lisa Stansfield
1997	"The Real Thing"	9	124	—	29	57	—	61	—	—	—		Lisa Stansfield
1997	"Never, Never Gonna Give You Up"	25	182	—	— (Note: "Never, Never Gonna Give You Up" did not enter the Ultratop 50 Singles Chart in Belgium Flanders, but peaked at number 5 on the Ultratip Chart.)	74	—	—	74	1	38		Lisa Stansfield
1997	"The Line"	64	—	—	—	—	—	—	—	—	—		Lisa Stansfield
1997	"Never Gonna Fall"	—	—	—	—	—	—	—	—	1	—		Lisa Stansfield
1997	"Don't Cry for Me"	—	—	—	—	—	—	—	—	—	—		Lisa Stansfield
1998	"I'm Leavin'"	—	—	—	—	—	—	—	—	1	—		Lisa Stansfield
1999	"The Longer We Make Love" (with Barry White)	—	—	—	—	—	—	—	—	—	—		Staying Power
2001	"Let's Just Call It Love"	48	—	—	—	—	—	—	—	—	—		Face Up
2001	"8-3-1"	—	—	—	—	—	—	—	—	—	—		Face Up
2003	"All Around the World" (Norty Cotto Mixes)	—	—	—	—	—	—	—	—	34	—		Biography: The Greatest Hits
2004	"Too Hot" (with Kool & the Gang)	—	—	—	—	—	—	—	—	—	—		The Hits: Reloaded
2004	"Easier"	—	—	—	—	—	—	—	—	—	—		The Moment
2005	"Treat Me Like a Woman"	—	—	36	—	43	—	—	—	—	—		The Moment
2005	"If I Hadn't Got You"	—	—	54	—	66	—	—	—	—	—		The Moment
2005	"He Touches Me"	—	—	—	—	—	—	—	—	—	—		The Moment
2013	"Can't Dance"	—	—	—	—	—	—	—	—	—	—		Seven
2014	"Carry On"	—	—	—	— (Note: "Carry On" did not enter the Ultratop 50 Singles Chart in Belgium Flanders, but peaked at number 44 on the Ultratip Chart.)	—	—	—	—	—	—		Seven
2014	"So Be It"	—	—	—	—	—	—	—	—	—	—		Seven
2014	"There Goes My Heart"	—	—	—	—	—	—	—	—	—	—		Seven+
2018	"Billionaire"	—	—	—	—	—	—	—	—	—	—		Deeper
2018	"Never Ever"	—	—	—	—	—	—	—	—	6	—		Deeper
"—" denotes releases that did not chart or was not released.

=== Soundtracks and appearances ===
Year	Single	Album
2001	"Somewhere My Baby Waits for Me"	The Wedding Planner: Music from the Motion Picture

== Home videos ==
Year	Title	Format
1990	Live! All Around the World	VHS, LD
1992	Real Life	VHS, LD
1992	Lisa at Wembley – Live	LD
2003	Biography: The Greatest Hits	DVD
2005	Live at Ronnie Scott's	DVD
2015	Live in Manchester	DVD, Blu-ray

== Music videos ==
Year	Title	Director(s)
1989	"People Hold On" with Coldcut	Big TV!
1989	"My Telephone" with Coldcut	Big TV!
1989	"This Is the Right Time" (EU version)	Big TV!
1989	"All Around the World"	Philip Richardson
1989	"All Around the World" (TF1 version)	Philippe Gautier
1990	"This Is the Right Time" (U.S. version)	Jimmy Fletcher
1990	"Live Together "	Philip Richardson
1990	"You Can't Deny It"	Steve Lowe & Jimmy Fletcher
1990	"What Did I Do to You?"	David Mallett
1990	"Down in the Depths"	Philippe Gautier
1991	"Change" (EU version)	Steve Lowe
1991	"Change" (U.S. version)	Stefan Würnitzer
1991	"All Woman"	Nick Brandt
1992	"All Around the World" (Barry White version)	Peter Stuart
1992	"Time to Make You Mine"	John Lindauer
1992	"Set Your Loving Free"	Nick Brandt
1992	"A Little More Love"	
1992	"Someday (I'm Coming Back)"	Marcus Nispel
1993	"In All the Right Places"	Nick Brandt
1993	"So Natural"	Marcus Nispel
1993	"So Natural" (Jazz version)	Marcus Nispel
1993	"Little Bit of Heaven"	Marcus Raboy
1994	"Dream Away" with Babyface	Randee St. Nicholas
1997	"The Real Thing"	Michael Geoghegan
1997	"Never, Never Gonna Give You Up"	Rocky Schenck
1997	"The Line"	Rocky Schenck
1997	"Don't Cry for Me"	Ben Unwin
1997	"People Hold On (Bootleg Mix)"	Max Abbiss-Biro
1998	"Baby I Need Your Lovin'"	
2001	"Let's Just Call It Love"	Howard Greenhalgh
2005	"Treat Me Like a Woman"	Kevin Godley
2005	"If I Hadn't Got You"	Steve Kemsley
2014	"Carry On"	
2014	"Carry On" (Acoustic Version)	
2014	"So Be It"	
2014	"There Goes My Heart"	
2018	"Billionaire"	
2018	"Never Ever"	
