= The Complete Collection (Lisa Stansfield album) =

2003 box set by Lisa Stansfield

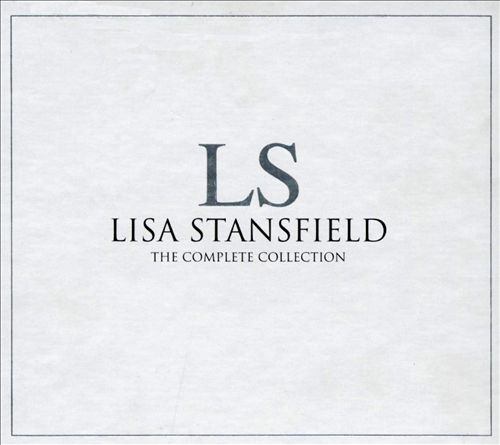

Box set by Lisa Stansfield
- Released: 2 June 2003
- Recorded: 1986–2001
- Genres: R&B; soul; pop; disco; dance; funk; pop rock; acid house
- Length: 444:28
- Label: Arista
- Producers: Blue Zone; Driza Bone; Bobby Boughton; Coldcut; Ian Devaney; The Dirty Rotten Scoundrels; David Foster; Frankie Knuckles; Massive Attack; Peter Mokran; Mark Morales; Andy Morris; Cory Rooney; Roger Sanchez; Lisa Stansfield

Lisa Stansfield chronology
Biography: The Greatest Hits (2003)	The Complete Collection (2003)	The Moment (2004)

The Complete Collection is a six-CD box set by British recording artist Lisa Stansfield. It was released by Arista Records in the United Kingdom on 2 June 2003 and includes five of Stansfield's studio albums with bonus tracks and a sixth disc with remixes, rarities and one previously unreleased song. The Complete Collection garnered favorable reviews from music critics. In 2014, more expanded The Collection 1989–2003 was also released.

== Background ==
After releasing Biography: The Greatest Hits on 3 February 2003, Stansfield fulfilled her deal with Arista Records and left the label. Arista Records remastered all of her studio albums and re-released them separately with bonus tracks on 2 June 2003. At the same time, they issued The Complete Collection which includes all the remastered studio albums with bonus tracks and an additional disc, Live/Rare/Mixed.

== Content ==
Digitally remastered limited edition white and silver embossed box set includes all of Stanfield's studio albums released through 2003. Each album comes in a digipak with the original artwork, new sleeve notes, new photos and bonus tracks on each disc. In addition to the regular studio albums, this set also includes a special Live/Rare/Mixed disc with single B-sides, live tracks, remixes and previously unreleased track. Stansfield's very first band, Blue Zone, with husband Ian Devaney and school mate Andy Morris is represented on Live/Rare/Mixed by "There Was I", "Dirty Talk" and the previously unreleased "The Answer" (recorded in 1986). The very rare B-sides "Sing It" and "Big Thing", and live recordings of "Tenderly" and medley "Live Together/Young Hearts Run Free" (both performed in a concert held at Wembley in 1992) are included as well as three club remixes. Bonus songs on the studio albums include: "People Hold On" (Single Mix), "My Apple Heart", "Lay Me Down", "Something's Happenin'", "When You're Gone", "Everything Will Get Better", "Change" (Frankie Knuckles Remix), "Gonna Try It Anyway", "Dream Away" (Duet with Babyface), "So Natural" (No Presevatives Mix by Roger Sanchez), "Breathtaking", "Baby Come Back", "All over Me", "Can't Wait To" and "You Get Me".

== Critical reception ==
Professional ratings
Review scores
Source	Rating
AllMusic	4/5 stars

The Complete Collection received positive reviews from music critics. According to Johnny Loftus from AllMusic, it is "definitely the most comprehensive Stansfield retrospective; it borders on overkill." He praised the Massive Attack version of "Live Together" on Live/Rare/Mixed. Tim Sendra, also from AllMusic focused on Live/Rare/Mixed and wrote that this disc "is exactly what it says it is: a collection of live tracks, B-sides, and an unreleased track ('The Answer'). The live tracks 'Tenderly' and the medley of 'Live Together/Young Hearts Run Free' are taken from a 1992 show at Wembley. The mixes are by Massive Attack, Driza Bone, and The Dirty Rotten Scoundrels and do a nice job of funking up Stansfield's often reserved style. The rest of the disc is made up of B-sides." Sendra called it "a nice collection for Stansfield fanatics". Alex Bettucchi also wrote a positive review and noted that the only flaw is the fact that The Complete Collection does not include any songs from Big Thing (1988) or Swing (1999).

== Track listing ==
Affection
No.	Title	Writer(s)	Producer(s)	Length
1.	"This Is the Right Time"	Lisa Stansfield, Ian Devaney, Andy Morris	Coldcut	4:29
2.	"Mighty Love"	Stansfield, Devaney, Morris	Devaney, Morris	5:11
3.	"Sincerity"	Stansfield, Devaney, Morris	Devaney, Morris	4:47
4.	"The Love in Me"	Stansfield, Devaney, Morris	Devaney, Morris	5:01
5.	"All Around the World"	Stansfield, Devaney, Morris	Devaney, Morris	4:29
6.	"What Did I Do to You?" (7"/Mark Saunders Single Version)	Stansfield, Devaney, Morris	Devaney, Morris	4:19
7.	"Live Together"	Stansfield, Devaney, Morris	Devaney, Morris	6:10
8.	"You Can't Deny It" (US Version)	Stansfield, Devaney, Morris	Devaney, Morris	4:27
9.	"Poison"	Stansfield, Devaney, Morris	Devaney, Morris	4:12
10.	"When Are You Coming Back?"	Stansfield, Devaney, Morris	Devaney, Morris	5:23
11.	"Affection"	Stansfield, Devaney, Morris	Devaney, Morris	5:52
12.	"Wake Up Baby"	Stansfield, Devaney, Morris	Devaney, Morris	3:58
13.	"The Way You Want It"	Stansfield, Devaney, Morris	Devaney, Morris	4:56
14.	"People Hold On" (Single Mix) (featuring Coldcut)	Matt Black, Jonathan More, Stansfield	Coldcut	3:58
15.	"My Apple Heart"	Stansfield, Devaney, Morris	Devaney, Morris	4:15
16.	"Lay Me Down"	Stansfield, Devaney, Morris	Devaney, Morris	4:14
17.	"Something's Happenin'"	Stansfield, Devaney, Morris	Devaney, Morris	3:48

Real Love
No.	Title	Writer(s)	Producer(s)	Length
1.	"Change"	Lisa Stansfield, Ian Devaney, Andy Morris	Devaney, Morris	5:39
2.	"Real Love"	Stansfield, Devaney, Morris	Devaney, Morris	5:01
3.	"Set Your Loving Free"	Stansfield, Devaney, Morris	Devaney, Morris	5:03
4.	"I Will Be Waiting"	Stansfield, Devaney, Morris	Devaney, Morris	5:03
5.	"All Woman"	Stansfield, Devaney, Morris	Devaney, Morris	5:17
6.	"Soul Deep"	Stansfield, Devaney, Morris	Devaney, Morris	4:10
7.	"Make Love to Ya"	Stansfield, Devaney, Morris	Devaney, Morris	4:54
8.	"Time to Make You Mine"	Stansfield, Devaney, Morris	Devaney, Morris	4:55
9.	"Symptoms of Loneliness & Heartache"	Stansfield, Devaney, Morris	Devaney, Morris	4:43
10.	"It's Got to Be Real"	Stansfield, Devaney, Morris	Devaney, Morris	5:17
11.	"First Joy"	Stansfield, Devaney, Morris	Devaney, Morris	4:25
12.	"Tenderly"	Stansfield, Devaney, Morris	Devaney, Morris	3:20
13.	"A Little More Love"	Stansfield, Devaney, Morris	Devaney, Morris	4:35
14.	"When You're Gone"	Stansfield, Devaney, Morris	Devaney, Morris	4:06
15.	"Everything Will Get Better"	Stansfield, Devaney, Morris	Devaney, Morris	5:00
16.	"Change" (Frankie Knuckles Remix)	Stansfield, Devaney, Morris	Devaney, Morris	6:29

So Natural
No.	Title	Writer(s)	Producer(s)	Length
1.	"So Natural"	Lisa Stansfield, Ian Devaney	Devaney, Stansfield, Bobby Boughton	5:05
2.	"Never Set Me Free"	Stansfield, Devaney	Devaney, Stansfield, Boughton	5:00
3.	"I Give You Everything"	Stansfield, Devaney	Devaney, Stansfield, Boughton	4:40
4.	"Marvellous & Mine"	Stansfield, Devaney, Andy Morris	Devaney, Stansfield, Boughton	4:14
5.	"Goodbye"	Stansfield, Devaney	Devaney, Stansfield, Boughton	4:35
6.	"Little Bit of Heaven"	Stansfield, Devaney	Devaney, Stansfield, Boughton	4:27
7.	"Sweet Memories"	Stansfield, Devaney	Devaney, Stansfield, Boughton	5:32
8.	"She's Always There"	Stansfield, Devaney	Devaney, Stansfield, Boughton	5:04
9.	"Too Much Love Makin'"	Tom Brock	Devaney, Stansfield, Boughton	4:34
10.	"Turn Me On"	Stansfield, Devaney, Morris	Devaney, Stansfield, Boughton	4:39
11.	"Be Mine"	Stansfield, Devaney	Devaney, Stansfield, Boughton	4:32
12.	"In All the Right Places"	John Barry, Stansfield, Devaney, Morris	Devaney, Morris	6:03
13.	"Wish It Could Always Be This Way"	Stansfield, Devaney	Devaney, Stansfield, Boughton	4:43
14.	"Gonna Try It Anyway"	Stansfield, Devaney	Devaney, Stansfield, Boughton	3:53
15.	"Dream Away" (Duet with Babyface)	Diane Warren	David Foster	4:38
16.	"So Natural" (No Presevatives Mix by Roger Sanchez)	Stansfield, Devaney	Devaney, Stansfield, Boughton	6:42

Lisa Stansfield
No.	Title	Writer(s)	Producer(s)	Length
1.	"Never Gonna Fall"	Lisa Stansfield, Ian Devaney	Ian Devaney, Peter Mokran	5:16
2.	"The Real Thing"	Stansfield, Devaney	Devaney, Mokran	4:20
3.	"I'm Leavin'"	Crayge Lindesay, Telisa Stinson	Devaney, Mokran	4:38
4.	"Suzanne"	Stansfield, Devaney	Devaney, Mokran	4:59
5.	"Never, Never Gonna Give You Up"	Barry White	Devaney, Mokran	5:02
6.	"Don't Cry for Me"	Stansfield, Devaney, Cory Rooney, Mark Morales	Devaney, Mokran, Rooney, Morales	5:03
7.	"The Line"	Stansfield, Devaney, Terry Gamwell	Devaney, Mokran	4:26
8.	"The Very Thought of You"	Stansfield, Devaney, Richard Darbyshire	Devaney, Mokran	5:23
9.	"You Know How to Love Me"	Reggie Lucas, James Mtume	Devaney, Mokran	5:32
10.	"I Cried My Last Tear Last Night"	Diane Warren	Devaney, Mokran	4:13
11.	"Honest"	Stansfield, Devaney, Darbyshire	Devaney, Mokran	4:54
12.	"Somewhere in Time"	Stansfield, Devaney, Darbyshire	Devaney, Mokran	4:44
13.	"Got Me Missing You"	Stansfield, Devaney	Devaney, Mokran	4:43
14.	"Footsteps"	Stansfield, Devaney, Darbyshire, Frank Musker	Devaney, Mokran	3:48
15.	"People Hold On" (Bootleg Mix)	Matt Black, Jonathan More, Stansfield	The Dirty Rotten Scoundrels	3:43
16.	"Breathtaking"	Stansfield, Devaney	Devaney	4:50
17.	"Baby Come Back"	J.C. Crowley, Peter Beckett	Devaney, Mokran	3:34

Face Up
No.	Title	Writer(s)	Producer(s)	Length
1.	"I've Got Something Better"	Lisa Stansfield, Ian Devaney, Richard Darbyshire	Devaney	4:25
2.	"Let's Just Call It Love"	Stansfield, Devaney, Darbyshire	Devaney	4:17
3.	"You Can Do That"	Stansfield, Devaney, Darbyshire, Frank Musker	Devaney	4:30
4.	"How Could You?"	Stansfield, Devaney, Darbyshire	Devaney	4:34
5.	"Candy"	Stansfield, Devaney, Darbyshire	Devaney	5:06
6.	"I'm Coming to Get You"	Stansfield, Devaney, Darbyshire	Devaney	3:54
7.	"8-3-1"	Stansfield, Devaney, Darbyshire, Charlotte Kelly	Devaney	4:31
8.	"Wish on Me"	Stansfield, Devaney, Darbyshire	Devaney	4:49
9.	"Boyfriend"	Stansfield, Devaney	Devaney	4:44
10.	"Don't Leave Now I'm in Love"	Stansfield, Devaney, Darbyshire	Devaney	4:17
11.	"Didn't I"	Stansfield, Devaney, Darbyshire	Devaney	4:51
12.	"Face Up"	Stansfield, Devaney, Darbyshire	Devaney	4:52
13.	"When the Last Sun Goes Down"	Stansfield, Devaney, Darbyshire, Frank Musker	Devaney	3:57
14.	"All over Me"	Stansfield, Devaney, Darbyshire	Devaney	5:09
15.	"Can't Wait To"	Stansfield, Devaney, Darbyshire, Kelly	Devaney	4:27
16.	"You Get Me"	Stansfield, Devaney, Darbyshire	Devaney	5:37

Live/Rare/Mixed
No.	Title	Writer(s)	Producer(s)	Length
1.	"There Was I" (B side of "Love Will Wait")	Lisa Stansfield, Ian Devaney, Andy Morris	Blue Zone	4:27
2.	"Dirty Talk" (B side of "Love Will Wait")	Stansfield, Devaney, Morris	Blue Zone	5:37
3.	"The Answer" (previously unreleased)	Stansfield, Devaney, Morris	Blue Zone	4:02
4.	"Sing It" (B side of "Live Together")	Stansfield, Devaney, Morris	Devaney, Morris	3:58
5.	"Big Thing" (B side of "This Is the Right Time")	Stansfield, Devaney, Morris	Devaney, Morris	4:59
6.	"Tenderly" (Live)	Stansfield, Devaney, Morris	Devaney, Morris	5:07
7.	"Live Together/Young Hearts Run Free" (Live)	Stansfield, Devaney, Morris, David Crawford	Devaney, Morris	7:53
8.	"People Hold On" (Full Length Disco Mix)	Matt Black, Jonathan More, Stansfield	Coldcut	9:22
9.	"Change" (Driza Bone Remix)	Stansfield, Devaney, Morris	Devaney, Morris, Driza Bone	6:09
10.	"Live Together" (Massive Attack Big Beat Mix)	Stansfield, Devaney, Morris	Devaney, Morris, Massive Attack	3:54

== Release history ==
Region	Date	Label	Format	Catalog
United Kingdom	2 June 2003	Arista	6×CD	82876 52431 2
