= List of awards and nominations received by Lisa Stansfield =

Lisa Stansfield awards and nominations
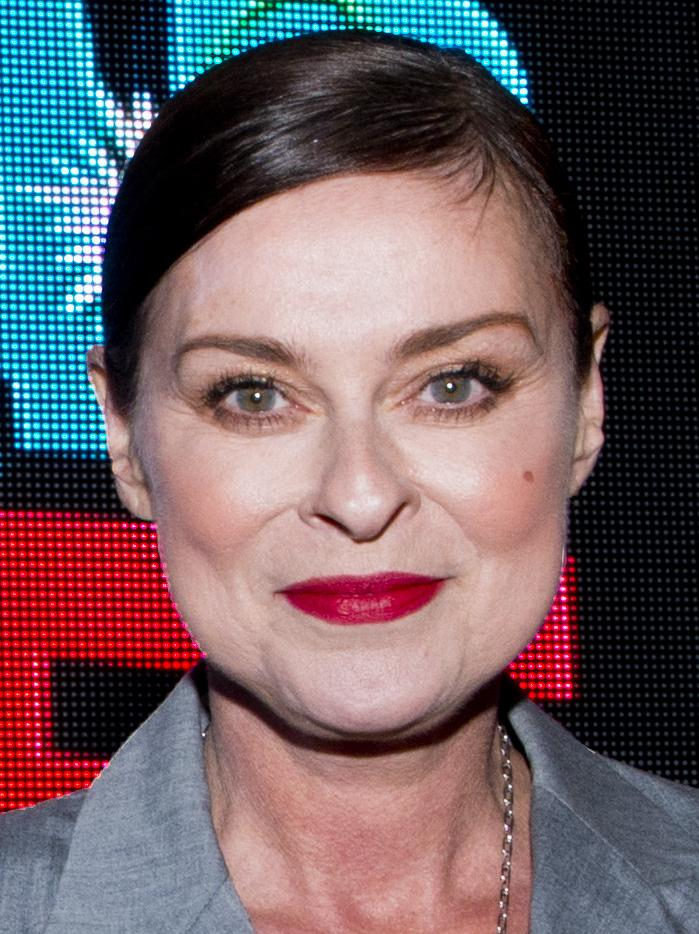
- Stansfield in 2014
Awards and nominations
Award	Wins	Nominations
ASCAP Awards	1	1
Billboard Music Video Awards	1	1
BRIT Awards	3	12
DMC Awards	3	3
Grammy Awards	0	2
Ivor Novello Awards	2	2
Razzie Awards	0	1
Silver Clef Awards	1	1
Women's World Awards	1	1
World Music Awards	1	1
Certifications	18	18
Year-end charts	16	16

Totals (Note: Certain award groups do not simply award one winner. They acknowledge several different recipients, have runners-up, and have third place. Since this is a specific recognition and is different from losing an award, runner-up mentions are considered wins in this award tally. For simplification and to avoid errors, each award in this list has been presumed to have had a prior nomination.)
- Wins: 38
- Nominations: 59

The following is a list of music awards and/or nominations earned by the British singer-songwriter Lisa Stansfield, along with her music recording sales certifications and entries in the year-end charts.

== Music awards and nominations ==
=== ASCAP awards ===
The American Society of Composers, Authors and Publishers (ASCAP) is a not-for-profit performance rights organization that protects its members' musical copyrights by monitoring public performances of their music, whether via a broadcast or live performance, and compensating them accordingly. Stansfield won one award:

Year	Nomination	Category	Result
1991	"All Around the World"	Writer of the Most Performed Song	Won

=== American Music Awards ===
Year	Nominee / work	Award	Result	Ref.
1991	Herself	Favorite Soul/R&B Female Artist	Nominated	
1991	Herself	Favorite Soul/R&B New Artist	Nominated	

=== BMI Pop Awards ===
Year	Nominee / work	Award	Result	Ref.
1993	"Change"	Award-Winning Song	Won	

=== Billboard Music Awards ===
The Billboard Music Awards are sponsored by Billboard magazine to honor artists based on Billboard Year-End Charts. The award ceremony was held from 1990 to 2007, until its reintroduction in 2011. Before and after that time span, winners have been announced by Billboard, both in the press and as part of their year-end issue.

Year	Nominee / work	Award	Result
1997	Herself	Top Hot Dance Club Play Artist	Nominated

=== Billboard Music Video awards ===
The Billboard Music Awards are sponsored by Billboard magazine. The awards are based on sales data by Nielsen SoundScan and radio information by Nielsen Broadcast Data Systems. Stansfield holds one award:

Year	Nomination	Category	Result
1990	Herself	Best Newcomer	Won

=== Brit awards ===
Brit Awards are the British Phonographic Industry's annual pop music awards. The awards began in 1977 and as annual event in 1982 under the auspices of the British record industry's trade association. From 2007, the BRITs reverted to a live broadcast on British television, on 14 February on ITV. Stansfield received three awards out of twelve nominations in total.

Year	Nomination	Category	Result
1990	"All Around the World"	British Video of the Year	Nominated^{A}
1990	"All Around the World"	British Single of the Year	Nominated^{B}
1990	Herself	British Breakthrough Act	Won
1990	Herself	British Female Solo Artist	Nominated^{C}
1991	Herself	British Female Solo Artist	Won
1991	Affection	British Album of the Year	Nominated^{D}
1992	Herself	British Female Solo Artist	Won
1992	Change	British Video of the Year	Nominated^{E}
1993	All Woman	British Video of the Year	Nominated^{F}
1993	Herself	British Female Solo Artist	Nominated^{C}
1995	Herself	British Female Solo Artist	Nominated^{G}
1998	Herself	British Female Solo Artist	Nominated^{H}

Notes

- ^{A} Won The Cure.
- ^{B} Won Phil Collins.
- ^{C} Won Annie Lennox.
- ^{D} Won George Michael's album Listen Without Prejudice Vol. 1.
- ^{E} Won Seal.
- ^{F} Won Shakespears Sister.
- ^{G} Won Eddi Reader.
- ^{H} Won Shola Ama.

=== Boisdale Music Awards ===
Year	Nominee / work	Award	Result	Ref.
2016	Herself	Outstanding Contribution to British Music	Won	

=== Classic Pop Reader Awards ===
Classic Pop is a monthly British music magazine, which launched in October 2012. It was devised and founded by Ian Peel, who was also editor for the first 19 issues. Rik Flynn stepped in as editor until Issue 23 followed by current editor Steve Harnell. Ian Peel remains involved as Founder & Editor-at-Large.

Year	Nominee / work	Award	Result
2019	Herself	Artist of the Year	Nominated
2019	"Billionaire"	Single of the Year	Nominated

=== DMC awards ===
Year	Nomination	Category	Result
1990	Herself	Best Artist	Won
1990	Affection	Best Album	Won
1991	Real Love	Best Album	Won

=== ECHO Awards ===
Year	Nominee / work	Award	Result	Ref.
1998	Herself	Best International Female	Nominated	

=== Grammy awards ===
The Grammy Awards are awarded annually by the National Academy of Recording Arts and Sciences (NARAS) in the United States. Stansfield was nominated twice in 1991.

Year	Nomination	Category	Result
1991	Herself	Best New Artist	Nominated^{I}
1991	"All Around the World"	Best Female Pop Vocal Performance	Nominated^{J}

Notes

- ^{I} Won by Mariah Carey.
- ^{J} Won also by Carey for her performance of "Vision of Love".

=== Ivor Novello awards ===
The Ivor Novello Awards as the major platform for recognising and rewarding Britain's songwriting and composing are awards presented annually in London by the British Academy of Songwriters, Composers and Authors (BASCA). They were first introduced in 1955.

Year	Nomination	Category	Result
1990	"All Around the World"	Best Contemporary Song	Won
1991	"All Around the World"	Best International Song	Won

=== Razzie awards ===
The Golden Raspberry Awards, abbreviated as the Razzies, is an anti-award presented in recognition of the worst in movies, on the contrary. The term raspberry in the name is used in its irreverent sense, as in "blowing a raspberry". The annual show, founded in 1981 by publicist John J.B. Wilson, precedes the corresponding Academy Awards ceremony by one day. Stansfield shares her nomination as a co-writer (along with John Barry, Ian Devaney and Andy Morris) for a song written for Indecent Proposal film.

Year	Nomination	Category	Result
1994	"In All the Right Places"	Worst Original Song	Nominated^{K}

Notes

- ^{K} Won "Addams Family Whoomp!" by Tag Team from Addams Family Values.

=== Silver Clef awards ===
The Silver Clef Awards is an annual music award event originally based in the UK, which is to support all the charity and awarding activities of the Nordoff-Robbins Centre for Music Therapy (that expanded also to U.S. in 1988).

Year	Nomination	Category	Result
1990	Herself	Best Newcomer	Won

=== Soul Train Music Awards ===
Year	Nominee / work	Award	Result	Ref.
1991	Affection	Best R&B/Urban Contemporary Album of the Year – Female	Nominated	
1991	"All Around the World"	Best R&B/Urban Contemporary Single – Female	Nominated	

=== Women's World awards ===
Since 2004, the Women's World Award are sponsored by the World Awards organization headed by former USSR President Mikhail Gorbachev, intended for women who have influenced the world by their work in areas such as society or politics. In 2005, the awards were given in Leipzig, Germany.

Year	Nomination	Category	Result
2005	Herself	World Arts Award	Won

=== World Music awards ===
The World Music Awards was an international awards show founded in 1989 that annually honored recording artists based on worldwide sales figures provided by the International Federation of the Phonographic Industry (IFPI).

Year	Nomination	Category	Result	Ref.
1991	Herself	Best-Selling British Female Recording Artist	Won	

=== Variety Club of Great Britain Awards ===
Year	Nomination	Category	Result
1990	Herself	Best Recording Artist of 1989	Won

== Music recording sales certifications ==
Music recording sales certification is a system of certifying that a music recording has shipped or sold a certain number of copies. The number of sales or shipments required for a silver, gold, (multi-)platinum or diamond threshold depends on the population of the territory in which the title is released. These certificates are not automatic; the record label must pay a fee to have carried out an audit into the release in question.

=== BPI ===
The British Phonographic Industry (BPI) is the UK record industry's trade association. The level of the award varies and certificates are usually awarded on the basis of the amount of units the release has shipped, rather than the amount it has sold. Stansfield received eight certifications.

Year	Nomination	Format	Award	Quota	Result
1989	"All Around the World"	Single	Gold	400,000	Certified
1990	Affection	Album	3× Platinum	900,000	Certified
1992	Real Love	Album	2× Platinum	600,000	Certified
1994	So Natural	Album	Platinum	300,000	Certified
1997	Lisa Stansfield	Album	Gold	100,000	Certified

=== BVMI ===
In Germany Bundesverband Musikindustrie (BVMI) (English: The Federal Association of Music Industry) represents the music industry. BVMI launched its Gold and Platinum award program in 1975, relying on an independent auditor for the accuracy of the sales required for the awards. Stansfield won three certifications.

Year	Nomination	Format	Award	Quota	Result
1990	"All Around the World"	Single	Gold	250,000	Certified
1990	Affection	Album	Platinum	500,000	Certified
1992	Real Love	Album	Gold	250,000	Certified

=== IFPI ===
In Europe, International Federation of the Phonographic Industry (IFPI) is the organization that represents the interests of the recording industry worldwide. It is headquartered in London, with regional offices in Brussels, Hong Kong, Miami and Moscow.

Year	Nomination	Format	Award	Quota	Result
IFPI Austria
1990	Affection	Album	Gold	10,000	Certified
1990	"All Around the World"	Single	Gold	15,000	Certified
IFPI Sweden
1990	Affection	Album	Gold	20,000	Certified
1990	"All Around the World"	Single	Gold	25,000	Certified

=== RIAA ===
The Recording Industry Association of America (RIAA) operates an award program for the releases that sell a large(r) number of copies. Peniston received three certifications.

Year	Nomination	Format	Award	Quota	Result
1990	"All Around the World"	Single	Platinum	1,000,000	Certified
1990	Affection	Album	Platinum	1,000,000	Certified
1992	Real Love	Album	Gold	500,000	Certified

== Year-end charts ==
Year-end charts are usually calculated by an inverse-point system based solely on a title's performance during any given chart year.

=== Austria ===
The official singles chart in Austria is Ö3 Austria Top 40, aired on Fridays on Hitradio Ö3. The weekly number-ones are released by Musikmarkt and go TV.

Year	Nomination	Category	Result
1990	"All Around the World"	Best Pop Song	#20

=== Italy ===
The Federation of the Italian Music Industry (FIMI) (Italian: Federazione Industria Musicale Italiana) is an umbrella organization that keeps track of virtually all aspects of the music recording industry in Italian. Starting 2008, the physical singles chart was replaced by a digital downloads chart based on legal Internet and mobile downloads.

Year	Nomination	Category	Result
1993	So Natural	Best Pop Album	#86
2005	The Moment	Best Pop Album	#177

=== The Netherlands ===
Dutch Top 40 is one of the three official singles charts in the Netherlands. Apart from Single Top 100, the Top 40 and Mega Top 50 include airplay data (i.e. the more often a song is played on the radio, the higher it is placed also in the chart).

Year	Nomination	Category	Result
1990	"All Around the World"	Best Pop Song	#46
1992	"Change"	Best Pop Song	#53

=== Switzerland ===
In Switzerland, Singles Top 75, respectively Alben Top 75 is effective, and the charts published by Media Control GfK International are a record of the highest-selling singles and albums in various genres in the country.

Year	Nomination	Category	Result
1990	"All Around the World"	Best Pop Song	#19

=== UK ===
UK Top 75 is compiled by The Official Charts Company (OCC) and published in Music Week magazine. The full list of Top 200 selling singles/albums in the United Kingdom is published exclusively in ChartsPlus. Unlike the U.S. charts, no airplay statistics are used for the UK list.

Year	Nomination	Category	Result
1989	"All Around the World"	Best Pop Single	#12
1989	"People Hold On"	Best Pop Single	#140
1989	"This Is the Right Time"	Best Pop Single	#163
1992	Real Love	Best Pop Album	#6
1992	"Time to Make You Mine'	Best Pop Single	#187
1993	"In All the Right Places"	Best Pop Single	#66
1993	"Someday (I'm Coming Back)	Best Pop Single	#104
1993	So Natural	Best Pop Album	#72
2003	Biography: The Greatest Hits	Best Pop Album	#73

=== U.S. ===
The U.S. Billboard Year-End charts are a cumulative measure of a single or album's performance in the United States, based upon the Billboard magazine charts during any given chart year.

Year	Nomination	Category	Result
1990	"All Around the World"	Best Pop Song	#21

== See also ==
- Lisa Stansfield discography
- List of artists who reached number one on the US Dance chart
