= Deeper (Lisa Stansfield album) =

Studio album by Lisa Stansfield
- Released: 6 April 2018
- Genre: Soul; pop
- Length: 53:35
- Label: earMUSIC
- Producer: Ian Devaney; Mark "Snowboy" Cotgrove

Lisa Stansfield chronology
Live in Manchester (2015)	Deeper (2018)

Singles from Deeper
- 1. "Billionaire" Released: 26 February 2018; 2. "Never Ever" Released: 16 April 2018

Professional ratings
Review scores
Source	Rating
Albumism	4.5/5 stars

Deeper is the eighth solo studio album by British singer Lisa Stansfield, released on 6 April 2018. All songs were written or co-written by Stansfield, and produced by Ian Devaney and Mark "Snowboy" Cotgrove.

== Background and release ==
"Everything" was made available to download on 8 January 2018 from pre-ordering the album, and the first official single, "Billionaire", was released on 26 February 2018. The second single, "Never Ever" followed in April 2018, reaching number six on the US Billboard Dance Club Songs chart. Stansfield embarked on the European tour in April 2018 to promote the album. The deluxe edition of Deeper was released on 26 October 2018, including a bonus disc with four new live recordings from Stansfield's recent tour, remixes of "Billionaire", "Deeper", and "Never Ever", as well as a new version of "There Goes My Heart".

== Track listing ==
All tracks are produced by Ian Devaney and Mark "Snowboy" Cotgrove.

Standard edition
No.	Title	Writer(s)	Length
1.	"Everything"	Lisa Stansfield; Ian Devaney	4:12
2.	"Twisted"	Stansfield; Devaney	3:55
3.	"Desire"	Stansfield	4:28
4.	"Billionaire"	Stansfield; Devaney	3:24
5.	"Coming Up for Air"	Stansfield; Devaney	4:06
6.	"Love of My Life"	Stansfield; Devaney	4:19
7.	"Never Ever"	Stansfield	3:53
8.	"Hercules"	Stansfield; John Carpenter	4:07
9.	"Hole in My Heart"	Stansfield	3:42
10.	"Just Can't Help Myself"	Stansfield	4:04
11.	"Deeper"	Stansfield	4:03
12.	"Butterflies"	Stansfield	4:34
13.	"Ghetto Heaven"	James Poyser; Michael Archer; Lonnie Lynn; Peter Moreland; Vernon Smith; Sandra St. Victor; Ahmir Thompson	4:48

Deluxe edition bonus disc
No.	Title	Writer(s)	Length
1.	"There Goes My Heart (Again)"	Stansfield; Devaney	5:06
2.	"Deeper" (Snowboy extended version)	Stansfield	5:32
3.	"Never Ever" (Snowboy extended version)	Stansfield	8:33
4.	"So Natural" (live from York)	Stansfield; Devaney	4:51
5.	"Soul Deep" (live from London)	Stansfield; Devaney; Andy Morris	4:32
6.	"All Woman" (live from Berlin)	Stansfield; Devaney; Morris	5:12
7.	"Real Love" (live from Paris)	Stansfield; Devaney; Morris	4:34
8.	"Billionaire" (Until Dawn remix)	Stansfield; Devaney	3:40
9.	"Billionaire" (Rob Hardt remix)	Stansfield; Devaney	4:07
10.	"Billionaire" (Rob Hardt back in time mix)	Stansfield; Devaney	4:26
11.	"Billionaire" (E11even remix)	Stansfield; Devaney	5:15
12.	"Billionaire" (DCS Dubz remix)	Stansfield; Devaney	3:54
13.	"Never Ever" (Brian Power mix)	Stansfield	7:15
14.	"Never Ever" (Mike Cruz club mix)	Stansfield	8:40
15.	"Never Ever" (Rob Hardt true emotions mix - extended)	Stansfield	8:53

=== Notes ===
- "Hercules" contains elements from "Assault on Precinct 13" composed by John Carpenter.
- The Japanese limited edition includes a bonus disc titled Live in Manchester 2014, featuring eight tracks from Stansfield's previous album, Live in Manchester.

== Charts ==
Chart (2018)	Peak position
Austrian Albums (Ö3 Austria)	11
Belgian Albums (Ultratop Flanders)	127
Belgian Albums (Ultratop Wallonia)	149
French Albums (SNEP)	145
German Albums (Offizielle Top 100)	7
Scottish Albums (OCC)	15
Spanish Albums (Promusicae)	93
Swiss Albums (Schweizer Hitparade)	23
UK Albums (OCC)	15
UK Independent Albums (OCC)	6

== Release history ==
Region	Date	Format	Edition	Label	Catalog
Europe; North America	6 April 2018	CD; digital; streaming	Standard	earMUSIC	4029759126195
Japan	13 April 2018	CD; digital; streaming	Standard; limited	earMUSIC	4562387206032
Europe	26 October 2018	CD; digital; streaming	Deluxe	earMUSIC	4029759136026
