= Marvellous & Mine =

Single by Lisa Stansfield

from the album So Natural
- Released: 21 July 1994
- Recorded: 1993
- Genre: Pop; soul; disco; funk
- Length: 4:14
- Label: Arista
- Songwriters: Lisa Stansfield; Ian Devaney; Andy Morris
- Producer: Ian Devaney

Lisa Stansfield singles chronology
"Little Bit of Heaven" (1993)	"Marvellous & Mine" (1994)	"Make It Right" (1994)

"Marvellous & Mine" is a song recorded by British singer-songwriter and actress Lisa Stansfield for her third album, So Natural (1993). It was released as the fourth and Japanese only single on 21 July 1994 by Arista Records. The song was written by Stansfield, Ian Devaney and Andy Morris, and produced by Devaney. The single was issued just before Stansfield's tour in Japan in September 1994.

The CD single included Sure Is Pure 12" Mix and Edited Master Mix of "Marvellous & Mine." It also featured previously released remixes of "So Natural" and "Little Bit of Heaven." The remix of "Marvellous & Mine" was also included on the "Dream Away" 1994 single and the 2014 deluxe 2CD + DVD re-release of So Natural (also on The Collection 1989–2003).

== Critical reception ==
In a retrospective review, Quentin Harrison from Albumism described the song as "luxurious" and "comprised of evocative strings, brass and bass rhythms". AllMusic editor William Cooper named it a "sunny, up-tempo number" in his review of So Natural. Pop Rescue called it "a grower" that "starts with a funky bassline". Upon the release, Clark Collis from Select described it as "slinky" and considered it "being [a] prime contender for maximum K-Mart rotation".

== Track listings ==
- Japanese CD single ("Marvellous & Mine" Natural Selection)
1. "So Natural" (DJ Duro's Hip Hop Mix) – 5:27
2. "So Natural" (U.S. Remix) – 5:25
3. "Little Bit of Heaven" (Bad Yard Club 12" Mix) – 7:27
4. "Little Bit of Heaven" (Junior Vocal Mix) – 6:39
5. "Marvellous & Mine" (Edited Master Mix) – 4:14
6. "Marvellous & Mine" (Sure Is Pure 12" Mix) – 9:43
- Other remixes
1. "Marvellous & Mine" (Sure Is Pure 12" Edit) – 8:28
