= Biography: The Greatest Hits =

2003 greatest hits album by Lisa Stansfield

Greatest hits album by Lisa Stansfield
- Released: 3 February 2003
- Recorded: 1989–2001
- Genres: R&B; soul; dance; pop
- Length: 120:45
- Label: Arista
- Producers: Black Science Orchestra; Coldcut; Ian Devaney; Dirty Rotten Scoundrels; Frankie Knuckles; George Michael; Peter Mokran; David Morales; Queen; Junior Vasquez

Lisa Stansfield chronology
Face Up (2001)	Biography: The Greatest Hits (2003)	The Complete Collection (2003)

Singles from Biography: The Greatest Hits
- 1. "All Around the World (Norty Cotto Mixes)" Released: 28 April 2003

Biography: The Greatest Hits is the first greatest hits compilation album by British recording artist Lisa Stansfield. Released by Arista Records on 3 February 2003, it features seventeen tracks, hits and rare songs, including: "All Around the World", "This Is the Right Time" "Change", "All Woman", "The Real Thing" and "Never, Never Gonna Give You Up". The album, which garnered positive reviews from music critics, peaked at number three in the United Kingdom and was certified Gold.

== Background ==
In June 2001, Stansfield released Face Up, her final studio album with Arista Records. The obligatory compilation, Biography: The Greatest Hits was issued in February 2003. Four months later, Arista Records remastered all of Stansfield's studio albums and re-released them with bonus tracks. The Complete Collection box set was also issued at the same time.

== Content ==
The European edition of Biography: The Greatest Hits includes three songs from Affection ("This Is the Right Time", "All Around the World", "Live Together"), four tracks from Real Love ("Change", "All Woman", "Time to Make You Mine", "Set Your Loving Free"), three songs from So Natural ("In All the Right Places", "So Natural", "Little Bit of Heaven"), two tracks from Lisa Stansfield ("The Real Thing", "Never, Never Gonna Give You Up") and one song from Face Up ("Let's Just Call It Love"). It also contains few non-album tracks: "People Hold On" (from Coldcut's album, What's That Noise?), "Down in the Depths" (from charity compilation, Red Hot + Blue), "Someday (I'm Coming Back)" (from The Bodyguard: Original Soundtrack Album) and "These Are the Days of Our Lives" (from charity EP, Five Live). The North American edition includes "You Can't Deny It" and "Never Gonna Fall" instead of "Little Bit of Heaven" and "Set Your Loving Free". In Europe, limited edition with bonus remix CD was also issued. Biography: The Greatest Hits was released simultaneously on DVD which includes most of Stansfield's music videos and a bonus material.

== Singles ==
The album does not include any new recordings. Arista Records issued promotional singles with new remixes of "All Around the World" created by Norty Cotto. The single was released in the United States on 28 April 2003 and reached number thirty-four on the Billboard's Hot Dance Club Songs. A remix by Junior Vasquez was also created. In 2014, these remixes of "All Around the World" were included on the deluxe 2CD + DVD re-release of Face Up (also on The Collection 1989–2003).

== Critical reception ==
Professional ratings
Review scores
Source	Rating
AllMusic	4.5/5 stars

Biography: The Greatest Hits received positive reviews from music critics. Heather Phares from AllMusic gave the album 4.5 out of 5 stars and wrote that it is a must for die-hard fans and an excellent primer for casual listeners.

== Commercial performance ==
Biography: The Greatest Hits peaked at number three on the UK Albums Chart and at number four in Italy. It also reached top forty in Belgium Flanders. The album was certified Gold in the United Kingdom. The DVD peaked at number twenty in Spain DVDs chart.

== Track listing ==
No.	Title	Writer(s)	Producer(s)	Length
1.	"Change" (edit)	Lisa Stansfield, Ian Devaney, Andy Morris	Devaney, Morris	4:33
2.	"Someday (I'm Coming Back)"	Stansfield, Devaney, Morris	Devaney, Morris	4:56
3.	"This Is the Right Time"	Stansfield, Devaney, Morris	Coldcut	4:30
4.	"The Real Thing"	Stansfield, Devaney	Devaney, Peter Mokran	4:18
5.	"People Hold On" (featuring Coldcut)	Stansfield, Matt Black, Jonathan More	Coldcut	3:58
6.	"In All the Right Places" (edit)	Stansfield, Devaney, Morris, John Barry	Devaney, Morris	5:16
7.	"So Natural"	Stansfield, Devaney	Devaney	5:05
8.	"Time to Make You Mine" (edit)	Stansfield, Devaney, Morris	Devaney, Morris	4:10
9.	"Live Together" (edit)	Stansfield, Devaney, Morris	Devaney, Morris	4:35
10.	"Little Bit of Heaven"	Stansfield, Devaney	Devaney	4:27
11.	"Set Your Loving Free" (edit)	Stansfield, Devaney, Morris	Devaney, Morris	4:09
12.	"Let's Just Call It Love" (edit)	Stansfield, Devaney, Richard Darbyshire	Devaney	3:59
13.	"Never, Never Gonna Give You Up" (edit)	Barry White	Devaney, Mokran	3:51
14.	"These Are the Days of Our Lives" (with Queen and George Michael)	Freddie Mercury, Brian May, Roger Taylor, John Deacon	George Michael, Queen	4:43
15.	"Down in the Depths"	Cole Porter	Devaney, Morris, Stansfield	4:27
16.	"All Woman"	Stansfield, Devaney, Morris	Devaney, Morris	5:16
17.	"All Around the World"	Stansfield, Devaney, Morris	Devaney, Morris	4:22

North American edition
No.	Title	Writer(s)	Producer(s)	Length
1.	"Change"	Stansfield, Devaney, Morris	Devaney, Morris	4:33
2.	"Someday (I'm Coming Back)"	Stansfield, Devaney, Morris	Devaney, Morris	4:56
3.	"This Is the Right Time"	Stansfield, Devaney, Morris	Coldcut	4:30
4.	"The Real Thing"	Stansfield, Devaney	Devaney, Mokran	4:18
5.	"People Hold On" (featuring Coldcut)	Stansfield, Black, More	Coldcut	3:58
6.	"In All the Right Places"	Stansfield, Devaney, Morris, Barry	Devaney, Morris	5:16
7.	"So Natural"	Stansfield, Devaney	Devaney	5:05
8.	"Time to Make You Mine"	Stansfield, Devaney, Morris	Devaney, Morris	4:10
9.	"Live Together"	Stansfield, Devaney, Morris	Devaney, Morris	4:35
10.	"You Can't Deny It" (edit)	Stansfield, Devaney, Morris	Devaney, Morris	4:20
11.	"Never Gonna Fall" (edit)	Stansfield, Devaney	Devaney, Mokran	4:35
12.	"Let's Just Call It Love"	Stansfield, Devaney, Darbyshire	Devaney	3:59
13.	"Never, Never Gonna Give You Up"	White	Devaney, Mokran	3:51
14.	"These Are the Days of Our Lives" (with Queen and George Michael)	Mercury, May, Taylor, Deacon	Michael, Queen	4:43
15.	"Down in the Depths"	Porter	Devaney, Morris, Stansfield	4:27
16.	"All Woman"	Stansfield, Devaney, Morris	Devaney, Morris	5:16
17.	"All Around the World"	Stansfield, Devaney, Morris	Devaney, Morris	4:22

European limited edition bonus CD
No.	Title	Writer(s)	Producer(s)	Length
1.	"Change" (Knuckles mix)	Stansfield, Devaney, Morris	Devaney, Morris, Frankie Knuckles	6:25
2.	"Never, Never Gonna Give You Up" (Knuckles mix)	White	Devaney, Mokran, Knuckles	8:41
3.	"People Hold On" (Dirty Rotten Scoundrels mix)	Stansfield, Black, More	Coldcut, Dirty Rotten Scoundrels	6:11
4.	"The Line" (Black Science Orchestra mix)	Stansfield, Devaney, Terry Gamwells	Devaney, Mokran, Black Science Orchestra	5:58
5.	"8-3-1" (David Morales club mix long intro)	Stansfield, Devaney, Darbyshire	Devaney, David Morales	8:28
6.	"Never Gonna Fall" (Junior Vasquez mix)	Stansfield, Devaney	Devaney, Mokran, Junior Vasquez	8:24

Japanese edition bonus CD
No.	Title	Writer(s)	Producer(s)	Length
1.	"Change" (Knuckles mix)	Stansfield, Devaney, Morris	Devaney, Morris, Knuckles	6:25
2.	"Never, Never Gonna Give You Up" (Knuckles mix)	White	Devaney, Mokran, Knuckles	8:41
3.	"People Hold On" (Dirty Rotten Scoundrels mix)	Stansfield, Black, More	Coldcut, Dirty Rotten Scoundrels	6:11
4.	"The Line" (Black Science Orchestra mix)	Stansfield, Devaney, Gamwells	Devaney, Mokran, Black Science Orchestra	5:58
5.	"8-3-1" (David Morales club mix long intro)	Stansfield, Devaney, Darbyshire	Devaney, Morales	8:28
6.	"Never Gonna Fall" (Junior Vasquez mix)	Stansfield, Devaney	Devaney, Mokran, Vasquez	8:24
7.	"Baby Come Back"	J.C. Crowley, Peter Beckett	Devaney, Mokran	3:34

=== DVD track listing ===
1. Coldcut feat. Lisa Stansfield – People Hold On
2. Lisa Stansfield – This Is The Right Time
3. Lisa Stansfield – This Is The Right Time (US version)
4. Lisa Stansfield – All Around The World
5. Lisa Stansfield – Live Together
6. Lisa Stansfield – Change
7. Lisa Stansfield – All Woman
8. Lisa Stansfield – Time To Make You Mine
9. Lisa Stansfield – Set Your Loving Free
10. Lisa Stansfield – Someday (I'm Coming Back)
11. Lisa Stansfield – Down in the Depths
12. Lisa Stansfield – In All The Right Places
13. Lisa Stansfield – So Natural
14. Lisa Stansfield – Little Bit of Heaven
15. Lisa Stansfield – These Are The Days of Our Lives
16. Lisa Stansfield – The Real Thing
17. Lisa Stansfield – Never, Never Gonna Give You Up
18. Lisa Stansfield – Let's Just Call It Love

=== DVD extras ===
19. Lisa Stansfield with Barry White – All Around The World
20. Lisa Stansfield – Change (US version)
21. Lisa Stansfield – What Did I Do To You? (live)
22. Lisa Stansfield – A Little More Love (live)
23. Lisa Stansfield – Change (live)
24. Lisa Stansfield – People Hold On (live)
25. Lisa Stansfield – Suzanne (live)
26. Out-takes

== Charts ==
=== Weekly charts ===
Chart (2003)	Peak position
Belgian Albums (Ultratop Flanders)	37
European Albums (Top 100)	16
German Albums (Offizielle Top 100)	46
Irish Albums (IRMA)	42
Italian Albums (FIMI)	4
Scottish Albums (Official Charts)	7
Spanish Albums (PROMUSICAE)	43
Swiss Albums (Schweizer Hitparade)	58
UK Albums (Official Charts)	3
UK R&B Albums (Official Charts)	5

=== Year-end charts ===
Chart (2003)	Position
UK Albums (OCC)	123

== Certifications and sales ==
Region	Certification	Certified units/sales
United Kingdom (BPI)	Gold	100,000^{^}
^{^} Shipments figures based on certification alone.

== Release history ==
Region	Date	Label	Format	Catalog
Europe	3 February 2003	Arista	CD	74321 98954 2
Europe	3 February 2003	Arista	2CD	82876 50222 2
North America	18 February 2003	Arista	CD	07822 10616 2
Australia	24 February 2003	Arista	CD	74321 98954 2
Japan	26 March 2003	Arista	2CD	BVCA-28003〜BVCA-28004
