= The Pagemaster =

1994 US fantasy adventure film

- Theatrical release poster by Drew Struzan
- Directed by: Joe Johnston (live-action); Maurice Hunt (animation)
- Screenplay by: David Casci; David Kirschner; Ernie Contreras
- Story by: David Kirschner; David Casci
- Produced by: David Kirschner; Paul Gertz
- Starring: Macaulay Culkin; Christopher Lloyd; Whoopi Goldberg; Patrick Stewart; Leonard Nimoy; Frank Welker; Ed Begley Jr.; Mel Harris
- Cinematography: Alexander Gruszynski (live-action)
- Edited by: Kaja Fehr (live-action)
- Music by: James Horner
- Production companies: Colbath; Hanna-Barbera
- Distributed by: 20th Century Fox; Turner Pictures
- Release date: November 23, 1994
- Running time: 76 minutes
- Country: United States
- Language: English
- Budget: $34 million
- Box office: $13.7 million (US)

The Pagemaster is a 1994 American live-action animated fantasy adventure film starring Macaulay Culkin, Christopher Lloyd, Whoopi Goldberg, Patrick Stewart, Leonard Nimoy, Frank Welker, Ed Begley Jr., and Mel Harris. The film was produced by Colbath and Hanna-Barbera and released by 20th Century Fox and Turner Pictures on November 23, 1994. Culkin stars as a timid boy who uses statistics as an excuse to avoid anything he finds uncomfortable in life. But after reluctantly undertaking an errand for his father, he gets caught in a storm, which forces him to seek refuge in a library. He then finds himself trapped inside the library, where he must battle his way through literary classics come to life if he is to find his way home.

The film was written for the screen by David Casci, based on a six-page pitch by writer Charles Pogue entitled "Library Days", presented to Casci by producer David Kirschner. The film was directed by Joe Johnston (live-action) and Pixote Hunt and Glenn Chaika (animation), and produced by David Kirschner and Paul Gertz. The film received generally negative reviews from critics and grossed $13.7 million from a budget of $34 million. The film's poor box office performance, along with the 1997 film Cats Don't Dance (which was in production at the time The Pagemaster was released), set back other animated films for the animation studio, Turner Feature Animation.

== Plot ==
Pessimistic 10-year-old Richard Tyler lives life based on statistics and fears everything. His exasperated parents have tried multiple ways to build up his courage, with little success. One day, Richard is sent by his father to buy a bag of nails for building a treehouse. However, Richard gets caught in a harsh thunderstorm and takes shelter in a library. Despite Richard's protests, he meets Mr. Dewey, an eccentric librarian/caretaker who insists that he needs a special book and gives him a library card. Searching for a phone, Richard finds a large rotunda painted with many famous literary characters. He slips on water dripping from his coat and falls, knocking himself out. Richard awakens to find the rotunda art melting; it washes over him and the library, turning them into illustrations.

He is met by the Pagemaster, the mythical Keeper of Books and Guardian of the Written Word. Richard asks for directions to the exit, so the Pagemaster sends him through the fiction section toward the green neon exit sign. Along the way, Richard befriends three anthropomorphic books: Adventure, a swashbuckling pirate-like book; Fantasy, a sassy but caring fairy-like book of fairytales; and Horror, a fearful "Hunchbook" with a misshapen spine. The three agree to help Richard if he checks them out with his new library card. Together, the quartet encounters classic fictional characters. They meet Dr. Jekyll who turns into Mr. Hyde, driving them to the open waters of the Land of Adventure. However, the group is separated after Moby-Dick attacks, following the whale's battle with Captain Ahab. Richard and Adventure are shipwrecked and picked up by the Hispaniola, captained by Long John Silver. The pirates go to Treasure Island, but find no treasure except for one gold coin, nearly causing a mutiny between Silver and his crew. Fantasy and Horror return and defeat the pirates. Silver attempts to convince Richard to leave with him but surrenders when Richard threatens him with a sword.

In the fantasy section, Richard sees the exit sign atop a mountain. However, Adventure's bumbling awakens a dormant dragon. Richard tries to fight the dragon with a sword and shield, but the dragon swallows him. Richard finds books in the dragon's stomach and uses a beanstalk from "Jack and the Beanstalk" to escape the dragon's mouth. He and the books climb the beanstalk to reach the exit. They enter a large dark room where the Pagemaster awaits them. Richard accuses the Pagemaster of causing all the horrors he suffered (some of which could have cost him his life). Still, as Dr. Jekyll, Captain Ahab, Long John Silver, and the dragon reappear in a magical twister and congratulate Richard for prevailing against them, the Pagemaster reveals the journey was intended to make Richard face his fears. The Pagemaster swoops Richard and the books into the twister, returning them to the real world.

Richard awakens, finding Adventure, Fantasy, and Horror lying next to him as real books. Mr. Dewey finds him, and though the library policy only allows a person to check out two books at a time, he lets him check out all three books "just this once."

Richard returns home a braver boy, sleeping in his new treehouse with his books, much to the bewilderment and delight of his parents: After they leave, the silhouettes of Adventure, Fantasy and Horror are seen conversing next to the sleeping Richard.

== Cast ==
=== Live-action ===
- Macaulay Culkin as Richard Tyler, a young 10-year-old boy who seems to have a fear of everything and runs his life based on safety statistics.
  - Culkin also voices Richard Tyler as a cartoon.
- Christopher Lloyd as Mr. Dewey, the unconventional librarian and caretaker of a seemingly abandoned library.
- Ed Begley Jr. and Mel Harris as Alan and Claire Tyler, Richard's supportive parents. Alan considers himself a bad father due to his continuous failed attempts to help Richard get over his fears.
- Kanin Howell, Jessica Kirschner, Brandon S. McKay, Alexis Kirschner, Guy Mansker, and Stephen Sheehan as the neighborhood kids. They make fun of Richard, who ignores them.

=== Voice cast ===
- Christopher Lloyd as the Pagemaster, the Keeper of the Books and Guardian of the Written Word. He is implied to be Mr. Dewey's alternate form.
- Patrick Stewart as Adventure, a swashbuckling gold adventure fiction book resembling a stereotypical pirate with an eyepatch, a hook, and a peg leg.
- Whoopi Goldberg as Fantasy, a fairy-styled lavender fairy-tale book. She can be opprobrious, aggressive, and hotheaded.
- Frank Welker as Horror, a turquoise horror fiction book with a resemblance to Igor. Despite his name, he is quite the opposite of horrific.
  - Welker also provides the sound effects of the dragon, Moby Dick, and the other creatures.
- Leonard Nimoy as Dr. Jekyll and Mr. Hyde, the mad scientist who turned into the horrific monster.
- George Hearn as Captain Ahab, an almost psychotic whale hunter who is out to kill the white whale Moby Dick.
- Jim Cummings as Long John Silver, the ruthless usurper Captain of the Hispaniola.
- Phil Hartman as Tom Morgan, a slender and violent pirate on the Hispaniola.
- Ed Gilbert as George Merry, a fat pirate on the Hispaniola.
- B.J. Ward as the Queen of Hearts, the tyrannical ruler of Wonderland who appears in the Alice in Wonderland book in the dragon's stomach.

The Pirates of the Hispaniola are voiced by Richard Erdman, Fernando Escandon, Dorian Harewood, and Robert Picardo.

== Production ==
The animation in the film was produced by Turner Feature Animation, headed by David Kirschner and supervising animator Bruce W. Smith and recently spun off from Hanna-Barbera. The crew included animators who were veterans of productions such as An American Tail (1986) (also co-wrote and produced by David Kirschner and composed by James Horner), The Land Before Time (1988). This was one of the first films to feature live-action, traditional animation, and CGI animation all together. One scene involving a computer-generated dragon made from paint was used, a challenge for the filmmakers. All of the fictional works featured in the film were created and first published before January 1, 1923, making them a part of the public domain in most countries. The theme songs in the film are "Dream Away", sung by Babyface and Lisa Stansfield, and "Whatever You Imagine", sung by Wendy Moten.

According to the film's animation crew, the film went overbudget during animation production due to mismanagement and changes to the narrative. Joe Johnston went on to express his dissatisfaction over the production, claiming that the film was re-edited without his consent. He has since crossed The Pagemaster off his résumé.

This was also the third film in which Leonard Nimoy and Frank Welker co-starred; the first two were Star Trek III: The Search for Spock and The Transformers: The Movie. The two later co-starred again, 17 years later, in Transformers: Dark of the Moon. Nimoy, along with David Kirschner, was also involved in Hanna-Barbera's 1993 feature-length animated television film adaptation of Ray Bradbury's 1972 fantasy novel, The Halloween Tree, in which Nimoy was the voice of Carapace Clavicle Moundshroud.

The Pagemaster was 20th Century Fox's last animated feature film to use the traditional hand-painted cel method of animation. 20th Century Fox's next animated film, Anastasia, produced by its own in-house animation division, would use a digital method of coloring and combining scanned drawings similar to Disney's CAPS software, which would eliminate the need for cels, the multiplane camera, and many of the optical effects used for the last time in The Pagemaster.

=== Legal issue ===
The screenwriting credits for this film were the subject of a protracted legal arbitration with the Writers Guild of America (WGA) when its producer, David Kirschner, attempted to claim sole authorship of the screenplay and original story, with no credit for its original screenwriter, David Casci. Typically, proposed credits are submitted to the WGA for approval well in advance of the release of a film or the publishing of posters or novelizations on which writing credits appear. In the case of The Pagemaster, the producers attempted to claim that, as the film was now largely animated, the WGA did not have jurisdiction to determine credits. Casci had written the screenplay under a WGA contract, as well as previous live-action versions for Disney Television dating back to 1985, also written under WGA contract. These facts positioned the WGA to get involved, testing their tenuous authority over a feature film with animated elements.

After a lengthy investigation and interviews with those intimately familiar with the genesis of the Pagemaster project, including three persons within Kirschner's own office, the WGA credit arbitration process determined that David Casci was, in fact, the primary writer, and that Kirschner did not provide a sufficient creative contribution to the writing process to warrant any screenwriting credit. Upon receiving this determination by the WGA, Fox threatened to pull out of arbitration and release the film without WGA-approved credits, positioning the WGA to be forced to file an injunction blocking the film's heavily promoted Christmas season release.

Ultimately, a settlement was reached, and Fox released the film with both Kirschner and Casci receiving story and screenplay credit, with a third writer, Ernie Contreras, also receiving screenplay credit.

At the time, this case was the most expensive and extensive investigation of its type undertaken by the WGA on behalf of one of its members.

=== Extended and deleted scenes ===
The Pagemaster is presented in an extended cut version. During the production, some original scenes were removed, both live-action and animation. The deleted scenes and characters can be still seen during the making of the film, trailers and TV spots, SkyBox International trading cards, books and other related products. They can be also seen during the sneak peek on the 1993 VHS release of Once Upon a Forest, the 1994 VHS release of Rookie of the Year, and in the promotional trailer of the VHS release of the film on the promotional demo/screener VHS copy in 1995.

== Release ==
The film was a production by Turner Pictures. 20th Century Fox handled U.S. distribution, while Turner Pictures Worldwide handled international distribution.

The film grossed $13.7 million in North American theaters from a budget of $34 million.

== Reception ==
On Rotten Tomatoes, the film has an approval rating of 19% based on 21 reviews and an average rating of 4.3/10. Audiences surveyed by CinemaScore gave the film a grade A− on scale of A to F.

Roger Ebert of the Chicago Sun-Times criticized the way the film's message came across, calling it a "sad and dreary film", adding that its message seemed to be that "books can be almost as much fun as TV cartoons and video arcade games". Brian Lowry of Variety said that the film's principal appeal for adults would be its abbreviated running time, and that it did not do enough with its famous fictional characters, noting: "A more inspired moment has Richard using a book, Jack and the Beanstalk, to escape from the belly of a dragon. Unfortunately, such moments are few and far between". Rita Kempley of The Washington Post gave the film a positive review, calling it a "splendidly original children's fantasy about the world of books". James Berardinelli of ReelViews gave another positive review, calling it a "clever, often engaging, and always fast-paced motion picture" that "uses the visual medium to encourage its viewers to reach out with their imagination".

The Pagemaster earned a Razzie Award nomination for Macaulay Culkin as Worst Actor for his performance in the film (also for Getting Even with Dad and Richie Rich). He lost the award to Kevin Costner for Wyatt Earp.

== Year-end lists ==
- 10th – Sandi Davis, The Oklahoman

== Home media ==
The Pagemaster was first released on VHS and LaserDisc on April 4, 1995, by Fox Video. 20th Century Fox Home Entertainment released the film on DVD on May 28, 2002, on Region 1 and Blu-ray on August 6, 2013, on Region A.

== Music ==
The score was written by film composer James Horner. The soundtrack also featured two songs based on Horner's themes. The songs were titled "Whatever You Imagine" by Wendy Moten which was heard during the film when all four characters finally enter into the fantasy section and "Dream Away" by Babyface and Lisa Stansfield is heard during the end credits. The soundtrack album was released only on Compact Disc and Cassette Tape format on October 30, 1994, and is also available in the iTunes Store.

== In other media ==
=== Book adaptations ===
Contrary to any claims, the screenplay and film are not based on any book. David Casci's screenplay preceded all novelizations and illustrated books by several years.

A number of books based on the film exist, including an illustrated book attributed to David Kirschner and Ernie Contreras, illustrated by Jerry Tiritilli, which contained large passages from the Casci screenplay without giving Casci writing credit. The film was well into production by the time this book was introduced in the 1993 F. A. O. Schwarz Christmas Catalog. Other properties based on the film include a novelization of the film, children's story books, pop-up books and other film ancillaries such as toys and games.

=== Video game ===
Video game adaptations of the film were released the same year as the film. They were developed by Probe Software Ltd. and published by Fox Interactive. The PC and non-PC versions of the game are almost entirely different games; the PC game is an FMV adventure game and is developed by Mammoth Micro Productions, published by Turner Interactive and distributed by Turner Home Entertainment, and the non-PC versions are platformers.

== See also ==
- List of 20th Century Fox theatrical animated features
- List of American films of 1994
