= Someday (I'm Coming Back) =

1992 single by Lisa Stansfield

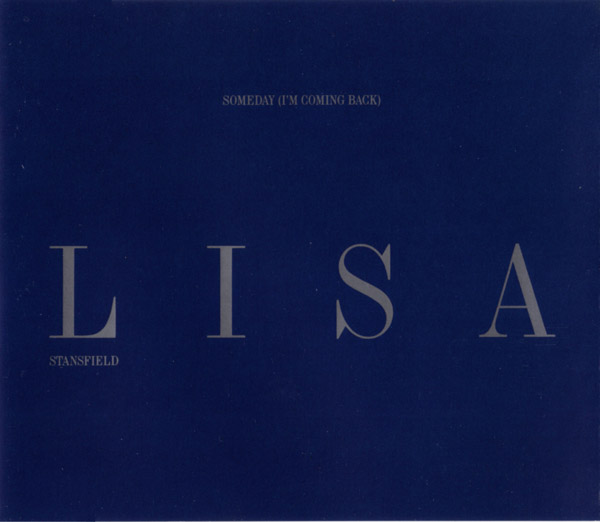

Single by Lisa Stansfield

from the album The Bodyguard: Original Soundtrack Album
- Released: 7 December 1992
- Genre: Disco; pop
- Length: 4:57
- Label: Arista; BMG
- Songwriters: Lisa Stansfield; Ian Devaney; Andy Morris
- Producers: Ian Devaney; Andy Morris

Lisa Stansfield singles chronology
"A Little More Love" (1992)	"Someday (I'm Coming Back)" (1992)	"In All the Right Places" (1993)

Music video
- "Someday (I'm Coming Back)" on YouTube

"Someday (I'm Coming Back)" is a song recorded by British singer, songwriter and actress Lisa Stansfield for the 1992 American romantic thriller film The Bodyguard, starring Kevin Costner and Whitney Houston. It was released as a single from the soundtrack album in the United Kingdom on 7 December 1992 and in other European countries in early 1993 by Arista Records. "Someday (I'm Coming Back)" was written by Stansfield, Ian Devaney and Andy Morris, and produced by Devaney and Morris. An accompanying music video, directed by Marcus Nispel, was also released. The single reached number ten in Portugal and the United Kingdom. "Someday (I'm Coming Back)" was remixed by Absolute and the "Classic" remixes were created by Frankie Knuckles and David Morales.

In 2003, the song was included on Stansfield's compilation, Biography: The Greatest Hits. In 2014, "Someday (I'm Coming Back)" and remixes of the song were included on the deluxe 2CD + DVD re-release of So Natural (also on The Collection 1989–2003).

== Chart performance ==
"Someday (I'm Coming Back)" was a notable hit on the charts in Europe, entering the top 10 in Portugal and the UK, peaking at number ten in both countries. In the latter, the single peaked on the UK Singles Chart on 27 December 1992. It debuted at number 19 in its first week on the chart, before climbing to number eleven and then peaking at number ten. It spent nine weeks inside the UK Top 100 and also peaked at numbers 14 and 12 on the UK Music Week Dance Singles chart and the UK Club Chart. Additionally, the single was a top-20 hit in Ireland (16), a top-30 hit in Iceland (29) and the Netherlands (30), while entering the top 40 in Flemish Belgium (39), as well as on the Eurochart Hot 100, where it reached number 34 in January 1993. On the Music & Media European Hit Radio chart, it reached number six. Outside Europe, "Someday (I'm Coming Back)" charted in Australia, peaking at number 116 on the ARIA singles chart.

== Critical reception ==
Amy Linden from Entertainment Weekly complimented the song as a "real beauty". Howard Cohen from The Miami Herald wrote that here, Stansfield "glides through a catchy, soulful number". Alan Jones from Music Week felt it's "more uptempo than we've had from her of late, a cheerful uplifting and very commercial cut which draws a polished and soulful vocal performance from her, punctuated by a wailing sax." Stephen Holden from The New York Times called it a "superior piece of pop-disco fluff that Lisa Stansfield infuses with a passionate intensity." Parry Gettelman from Orlando Sentinel viewed it as "a disposable dance number from the ordinarily enticing Lisa Stansfield." James Hamilton from the Record Mirror Dance Update complimented it as "prettily cooed". Arion Berger from Rolling Stone felt that here, Stansfield "holds up a sturdy vocal wall of Jericho". John Mackie from The Vancouver Sun stated that she "adds a little style and a soulful vocal to the gliding dance number".

== Retrospective response ==
In a 2022 retrospective review, Matthew Hocter from Albumism wrote, "One of the album's best tracks that never received its dues, Lisa Stansfield's 'Someday (I'm Coming Back)' was the second single released from the album. Credited as disco/pop, it is much more soulful than this qualifier, with Stansfield dynamically delivering her unique brand of blue-eyed soul with each and every note she masters throughout this beautifully polished and executed song. The saxophone lamenting in and out of the track only adds to its intensity and passion. It's pure disco soul at its finest." Bob Waliszewski of Plugged In (publication) declared it as "a positive tune about supportive romance".

== Track listings ==
- European 12-inch single
1. "Someday (I'm Coming Back)" – 5:34
2. "Live Together"/"Young Hearts Run Free" (live) – 7:51
3. "Someday (I'm Coming Back)" (Absolute remix) – 6:24
4. "Tenderly" (live) – 5:00
- European CD single
1. "Someday (I'm Coming Back)" – 5:34
2. "Tenderly" (live) – 5:00
- European CD maxi single
1. "Someday (I'm Coming Back)" – 5:34
2. "Tenderly" (live) – 5:00
3. "Live Together/Young Hearts Run Free" (live) – 7:51

== Charts ==
Chart (1992–1993)	Peak position
Australia (ARIA)	116
Belgium (Ultratop 50 Flanders)	39
Europe (Eurochart Hot 100)	34
Europe (European Hit Radio)	6
Germany (GfK)	51
Iceland (Íslenski Listinn Topp 40)	29
Ireland (IRMA)	16
Israel (Israeli Singles Chart)	19
Netherlands (Dutch Top 40)	30
Netherlands (Single Top 100)	42
Portugal (AFP)	10
UK Singles (Official Charts)	10
UK Airplay (Music Week)	3
UK Dance (Music Week)	14
UK Club Chart (Music Week)	12

== Release history ==
Region	Date	Format(s)	Label(s)	Ref.
United Kingdom	7 December 1992	7-inch vinyl; 12-inch vinyl; CD; cassette	Arista; BMG	
Australia	25 January 1993	12-inch vinyl; CD; cassette	Arista; BMG	
