= Make It Right (Lisa Stansfield song) =

Single by Lisa Stansfield

from the album Beverly Hills 90210: The College Years
- Released: 5 September 1994
- Recorded: 1994
- Genre: Pop; R&B; soul
- Length: 3:57
- Label: Giant
- Songwriters: Rhett Lawrence; Crystal Bernard; Suzie Benson
- Producers: Rhett Lawrence; Ian Devaney

Lisa Stansfield singles chronology
"Marvellous & Mine" (1994)	"Make It Right" (1994)	"Dream Away" (1994)

"Make It Right" is a song recorded by British singer-songwriter and actress Lisa Stansfield for the 1994 soundtrack to the American drama series, Beverly Hills, 90210. It was written by Rhett Lawrence, Crystal Bernard and Suzie Benson, and produced by Lawrence and Ian Devaney. "Make It Right" was released as a promotional single in the United States on 5 September 1994 by Giant Records. Therefore, it was not eligible to chart on the Billboard Hot 100. However, the song reached number 71 on the Cash Box Top 100, number 46 on the Hot Dance Club Songs chart and 64 on the Hot R&B Singles chart. The CD single was released in Germany on 2 October 1994 but failed to chart because of lack of promotion and no music video. It was also issued as a mini CD single in Japan on 23 November 1994. The song was remixed by R. Kelly, Kenny "Dope" Gonzalez and Rhett Lawrence. "Make It Right" was not included on any of Stansfield's albums.

== Critical reception ==
Larry Flick from Billboard magazine described the song as a "Stansfield jam that is stronger than anything she has offered in a long while." He noted that she "excels amid a flurry of jack/funk beats and whispery backing vocals. Her fluid vocal tones flow freely over a hummable melody." Dave Sholin from the Gavin Report commented, "School's almost in session, and it coincides with release of the sequel to the Beverly Hills 90210 Soundtrack: Volume 2 The College Years. Lisa Stansfield is a brilliant choice to pair with this song. R. Kelly's re-mix is the one for Top 40."

== Track listings ==
- German CD maxi single
1. "Make It Right" (Album Version) – 3:57
2. "Make It Right" (R. Kelly Remix) – 4:04
3. "Make It Right" (R. Kelly Groove Remix) – 3:42
4. "Make It Right" (R. Kelly Extended Groove Remix) – 5:19
5. "Make It Right" (Rhetro G-Mix) – 4:16
- Japanese CD single
1. "Make It Right" (R. Kelly Remix) – 4:04
2. "Make It Right" (R. Kelly Extended Groove Remix) – 5:19
- US promotional CD single
1. "Make It Right" (Album Version) – 3:57
2. "Make It Right" (Alternate Bridge) – 3:57
- US promotional CD maxi single
1. "Make It Right" (Kenny Dope Remix) – 3:58
2. "Make It Right" (Kenny Dope Extended Remix) – 5:58
3. "Make It Right" (Single Version) – 3:57
4. "Make It Right" (R. Kelly Remix) – 4:04
5. "Make It Right" (R. Kelly Extended Groove Remix) – 5:19
6. "Make It Right" (Rhetro G-Mix) – 4:16

== Charts ==
Chart (1994–1995)	Peak position
Europe (European Dance Radio)	23
Canada Adult Contemporary (RPM)	29
US Dance Club Songs (Billboard)	46
US Hot R&B/Hip-Hop Songs (Billboard)	64
US Cash Box Top 100	71
