= Little Bit of Heaven =

1993 single by Lisa Stansfield

Single by Lisa Stansfield

from the album So Natural
- Released: 29 November 1993
- Genre: Synth-pop
- Length: 4:27
- Label: Arista
- Songwriters: Lisa Stansfield; Ian Devaney
- Producer: Ian Devaney

Lisa Stansfield singles chronology
| "So Natural" (1993) | "Little Bit of Heaven" (1993) | "Marvellous & Mine" (1994) |

Music video
- "Little Bit of Heaven" on YouTube

"Little Bit of Heaven" is a song by British singer-songwriter and actress Lisa Stansfield from her third album, So Natural (1993). It was released by Arista Records as the second proper single in the United Kingdom on 29 November 1993 and in other European countries in March 1994. The song was written by Stansfield and her husband, Ian Devaney, and produced by Devaney.

An accompanying music video, directed by Marcus Raboy, was also released, filmed in Rome. The CD single included "Gonna Try It Anyway," which was available on the Japanese edition of So Natural only, and remixes of "Little Bit of Heaven" created by David Morales, Pete Heller, Terry Farley, Roach Motel, Paul Waller and Seamus Haji. The song reached number thirty-two in the United Kingdom.

In 1994, Arista released in Japan a special CD maxi single "Marvellous & Mine Natural Selection" which included remixes form the So Natural era. In 2003, "Little Bit of Heaven" was included on Biography: The Greatest Hits. In 2014, the remixes of "Little Bit of Heaven" were included on the deluxe 2CD + DVD re-release of So Natural (also on The Collection 1989–2003).

== Chart performance ==
"Little Bit of Heaven" was not as successful commercially as the earlier singles, but it still made some impact on the charts in Europe. In the UK, the song peaked at number 32 in its first week on the UK Singles Chart on 5 December 1993. It then dropped to number 43 and then to 54, where it stayed for two weeks before leaving the UK Top 75. On both the Music Week Dance Singles chart and the Record Mirror Club Chart, it was far more successful, peaking at numbers 12 and 11, respectively. And on the Music Week Airplay chart, the single hit number two in the same period, being held off the number one position by Pet Shop Boys' "I Wouldn't Normally Do This Kind of Thing". "Little Bit of Heaven" was also a top-30 hit in Iceland (26) and a top-60 hit in Germany (54). On the Eurochart Hot 100 and European Dance Radio Chart by Music & Media, it reached numbers 92 and 12. Elsewhere, it charted in Australia, peaking at number 153 on the ARIA Singles chart.

== Critical reception ==
In a 2018 retrospective review, Quentin Harrison from Albumism described "Little Bit of Heaven" as "breezy", with "its flavor deepened with some chirpy disco widgetry." AllMusic editor William Cooper deemed it a "bland, dated-sounding synth pop throwback". In his weekly UK chart commentary, James Masterton noted that here, Stansfield "eases back onto the dancefloor for her third hit of the year". Pan-European magazine Music & Media wrote, "What would the entire heaven be like, is the question that arises on hearing this danceable soul song. May it turn the world into paradise for the four minutes that it takes." Alan Jones from Music Week gave it three out of five, commenting, "In isolation, this classily delivered song is pleasant enough, but it would be nice to hear Stansfield ringing the changes. A selection of dance mixes vary the tempo a bit, but not much." James Hamilton from the Record Mirror Dance Update called it a "pleasantly melodic light-weight mellow lurching loper". In a 2015 retrospective review, Pop Rescue remarked that "there's some nice vocal harmonies in the chorus, with some funky brass sections and disco 'pops'."

== Music video ==
The music video for "Little Bit of Heaven" was directed by American film and music video director Marcus Raboy. It was filmed in Rome, Italy and depicts Stansfield alone in an old apartment. In between, a young boy runs around in the streets of the district and several female dancers performs. In the beginning, Stansfield sits on a bed while she sings. Other times she is seen by a large round table or looking at herself in a dusty mirror. By a window, the curtains slowly blows in the wind. The boy passes an elderly man who puts up advertisements on the walls and stops by a newspaper kiosk where he runs off with a magazine. He tears out a page and then appears at the door of Stansfield's apartment, peeking at the singer while she sings and dances. Towards the end, Stansfield performs outdoors, obviously standing on top of the building, overlooking the other old buildings.

== Track listings ==
- European 7-inch single and Japanese CD single
1. "Little Bit of Heaven" (radio mix) – 4:16
2. "Gonna Try It Anyway" – 3:53
- European 12-inch single
1. "Little Bit of Heaven" (Bad Yard Club 12-inch mix) – 7:27
2. "Little Bit of Heaven" (Bad Yard dub) – 5:44
3. "Little Bit of Heaven" (radio mix) – 4:16
4. "Little Bit of Heaven" (Junior vocal mix) – 6:39
5. "Little Bit of Heaven" (Roach Motel dub) – 9:06
6. "Little Bit of Heaven" (Seventh Heaven vocal mix) – 6:21
- European CD single
1. "Little Bit of Heaven" (radio mix) – 4:16
2. "Gonna Try It Anyway" – 3:53
3. "Little Bit of Heaven" (Bad Yard Club 12-inch mix) – 7:27
4. "Little Bit of Heaven" (Junior vocal mix) – 6:39

== Charts ==
| Chart (1993–1994) | Peak position |
|---|---|
| Australia (ARIA) | 153 |
| Europe (Eurochart Hot 100) | 92 |
| Europe (European AC Radio) | 25 |
| Europe (European Dance Radio) | 12 |
| Europe (European Hit Radio) | 25 |
| Germany (Official German Charts) | 54 |
| Iceland (Íslenski Listinn Topp 40) | 26 |
| UK Singles (Official Charts) | 32 |
| UK Airplay (Music Week) | 2 |
| UK Dance (Music Week) | 12 |
| UK Club Chart (Music Week) | 11 |

== Release history ==
| Region | Date | Format(s) | Label(s) | Ref. |
|---|---|---|---|---|
| United Kingdom | 29 November 1993 | 7-inch vinyl; 12-inch vinyl; CD; cassette | Arista | |
| Australia | 17 January 1994 | 12-inch vinyl; CD; cassette | Arista | |
| Japan | 23 February 1994 | Mini-CD | Arista | |
