= Five Live (George Michael and Queen EP) =

1993 EP by George Michael and Queen

EP by George Michael and Queen with Lisa Stansfield
- Released: 19 April 1993
- Recorded: August–September 1974; March 1991; 20 April 1992
- Venues: Wembley Arena (London); Wembley Stadium (London)
- Studios: AIR Oxford Circus (London); Trident (London)
- Genres: Pop rock; dance-pop
- Length: 28:46
- Labels: Hollywood (US and Canada); Parlophone (rest of world)
- Producers: Queen; George Michael; Roy Thomas Baker

George Michael chronology
Listen Without Prejudice Vol. 1 (1990)	Five Live (1993)	Older (1996)

Queen chronology
The 12″ Collection (1992)	Five Live (1993)	Greatest Hits I & II (1994)

Lisa Stansfield chronology
Real Love (1991)	Five Live (1993)	So Natural (1993)

Singles from Five Live
- 1. "Somebody to Love" Released: 19 April 1993; 2. "Killer" / "Papa Was a Rollin' Stone" Released: 17 May 1993

Professional ratings
Review scores
Source	Rating
AllMusic	2/5 stars
Freaky Trigger	4/10
Los Angeles Times	2/4 stars
Music Week	4/5 stars

Five Live is an EP released on 19 April 1993, featuring five (in some countries, where it is considered to be a reduced-length long-playing album, six) tracks, performed by George Michael, Queen, and Lisa Stansfield. "Somebody to Love" and "These Are the Days of Our Lives" (both also available on video) were recorded at the Freddie Mercury Tribute Concert, held on 20 April 1992, at Wembley Stadium.

All proceeds from the sale of the EP benefited the Mercury Phoenix Trust. Sales of the record were very strong throughout Europe, where it debuted at number one on the UK Singles Chart, and several European countries, either considered as a single, or charting on album charts as an extended play or an LP. Chart success in the US was far less spectacular, but the EP still peaked at number 46 on the Billboard 200.

A shortened version of "Killer" and "Papa Was a Rollin' Stone", a live medley performed by Michael at Wembley Arena, was released as a further independent single, in some territories only. The singer also shot a music video for it, but did not personally appear in full face. The video was directed by Marcus Nispel.

While "These Are the Days of Our Lives" is played by the remaining members of Queen, the vocal is a duet between George Michael and Lisa Stansfield. However, it features alterations from the tribute concert (Michael's vocals are re-recorded, for example).

The sixth track – only featured on some versions of the release – is represented by a short performance by Queen, entitled "Dear Friends", originally sung by Freddie Mercury. Recorded in 1974 and originally appearing on the band's Sheer Heart Attack album; this constitutes the one studio recording on the record. It was not included in the UK vinyl of the EP.

Usually, countries where the six-track work is distributed consider it to be a short LP, whereas those where the five-track (hence its title) work is available generally tend to see it as an EP or even (if "Killer" / "Papa Was a Rollin' Stone" was not marketed independently in those same territories) as a particularly long or content-rich single.

== Track listing ==
No.	Title	Writer(s)	Artist(s)	Length
1.	"Somebody to Love" (Recorded at Wembley Stadium on 20 April 1992)	Freddie Mercury	Queen and George Michael	5:17
2.	"Killer" (Recorded at Wembley Arena in March 1991)	Adam Tinley; Seal-Henry Samuel	George Michael	5:57
3.	"Papa Was a Rollin' Stone" (Recorded at Wembley Arena in March 1991)	Norman Whitfield; Barrett Strong	George Michael	5:25
4.	"These Are the Days of Our Lives" (Recorded at Wembley Stadium on 20 April 1992)	Mercury; Brian May; Roger Taylor; John Deacon	Queen, George Michael and Lisa Stansfield	4:43
5.	"Calling You" (Recorded at Wembley Arena in March 1991)	Bob Telson	George Michael	6:17
6.	"Dear Friends" (from Sheer Heart Attack)	May	Queen	1:07
Total length:				28:46

== Charts ==
=== Weekly charts ===
Chart (1993)	Peak position
Australian Albums (ARIA)	17
Austrian Albums (Ö3 Austria)	2
Canada Top Albums/CDs (RPM)	32
Danish Singles (IFPI)	2
Dutch Albums (Album Top 100)	2
European Albums (Top 100)	5
European Singles (Eurochart Hot 100)	7
Finnish Albums (Suomen virallinen lista)	39
French Albums (SNEP)	12
German Albums (Offizielle Top 100)	8
Greek Singles (AFP)	2
Hungarian Albums (MAHASZ)	11
Ireland (IRMA)	1
Japanese Albums (Oricon)	35
New Zealand Albums (RMNZ)	9
Norwegian Albums (VG-lista)	19
Portuguese Albums (AFP)	1
Spanish Albums (AFYVE)	18
Spanish Singles (AFYVE)	1
Swedish Albums (Sverigetopplistan)	45
Swiss Albums (Schweizer Hitparade)	6
UK Singles (Official Charts)	1
US Billboard 200	46

=== Year-end charts ===
Chart (1993)	Position
Austrian Albums (Ö3 Austria)	19
Dutch Albums (MegaCharts)	19
European Singles (Eurochart Hot 100)	49
French Albums (SNEP)	30
German Albums (Offizielle Top 100)	30
UK Singles (OCC)	11

== Certifications ==
Region	Certification	Certified units/sales
Austria (IFPI Austria)	Gold	25,000^{*}
France (SNEP)	Gold	100,000^{*}
Germany (BVMI)	Gold	250,000^{^}
Netherlands (NVPI)	Gold	50,000^{^}
Switzerland (IFPI Switzerland)	Gold	25,000^{^}
United Kingdom (BPI)	Gold	410,150
United States	—	358,000
^{*} Sales figures based on certification alone.^{^} Shipments figures based on certification alone.

== Release history ==
Country	Date	Label	Format	Catalogue	Ref.
United Kingdom	19 April 1993	Parlophone	CD	CDRS 6340	
United Kingdom	19 April 1993	Parlophone	7-inch vinyl	R 6340	
United Kingdom	19 April 1993	Parlophone	Cassette	TC-R 6340	
Europe	19 April 1993	EMI	CD	0777 7 89418 2 8	
