= In All the Right Places =

1993 single by Lisa Stansfield

Single by Lisa Stansfield

from the album Indecent Proposal: Music from the Original Motion Picture Soundtrack and So Natural
- Released: 24 May 1993
- Genre: Pop; soul
- Length: 5:42
- Label: MCA
- Songwriters: John Barry; Lisa Stansfield; Ian Devaney; Andy Morris
- Producers: Ian Devaney; Andy Morris

Lisa Stansfield singles chronology
"Someday (I'm Coming Back)" (1992)	"In All the Right Places" (1993)	"So Natural" (1993)

Music video
- "In All the Right Places" on YouTube

"In All the Right Places" is a song by British singer-songwriter and actress Lisa Stansfield for the 1993 drama film Indecent Proposal, starring Robert Redford and Demi Moore. It was released as a lead single in the United Kingdom on 24 May 1993 and in other European countries in July 1993 by MCA Records. The lyrics were written by Stansfield, Ian Devaney and Andy Morris, and the music was composed by John Barry, who created the soundtrack for the film. Devaney and Morris also produced the song which received positive reviews from music critics. It reached number eight in the United Kingdom and Ireland. The accompanying music video was directed by Nick Brandt.

The Soul Mix of "In All the Right Places" was included on Stansfield's next studio album, So Natural, which was released in November 1993. Ten years later, "In All the Right Places" was also featured on Biography: The Greatest Hits (2003). In 2014, the soundtrack version of "In All the Right Places" was included on the deluxe 2CD + DVD re-release of So Natural (also on The Collection 1989–2003). The song was nominated for Golden Raspberry Award for Worst Original Song.

== Chart performance ==
"In All the Right Places" enjoyed moderate success on the charts, entering the top 10 in Ireland (8), Portugal (4) and the UK. In the latter, the song peaked at number eight in its fourth week on the UK Singles Chart on 20 June 1993. Having debuted at number 13, it then climbed to number nine and back to number ten, before peaking at number eight. It also peaked at number ten on the Music Week Dance Singles chart. Additionally, the song was a top-20 hit in the Netherlands and a top-30 hit on the Eurochart Hot 100, where it peaked at number 24 in July 1993. It also entered the top 70 in Germany (63). Outside Europe, "In All the Right Places" peaked at number 26 on the Canadian RPM Adult Contemporary chart and number 132 in Australia.

== Critical reception ==
In a retrospective review in 2018, Quentin Harrison from Albumism highlighted "In All the Right Places" as one of the album's "most significant compositions", noting that Stansfield "vocally burns the house" on the song. Upon the release, Larry Flick from Billboard magazine complimented it as a "shimmering pop ballad fueled by Stansfield's positively flawless vocal and an arrangement reminiscent of vintage compositions." He remarked that it "builds from a quiet place to a climax that will leave you with goosebumps." Ken Capobianco from The Boston Globe named it a "solid new track" that "continues her successful streak of sultry pop soul." Ben Thompson from The Independent felt "In All the Right Places" "has a nice Bond-theme sweep about it". In his weekly UK chart commentary, James Masterton stated, "If ever a record was born to be No.1 this has to be it."

Alan Jones from Music Week gave it a score of four out of five and named it Pick of the Week, writing that "this typically soulful and sophisticated performance lacks the power of some of her previous singles". R.S. Murthi from New Straits Times stated that Stansfield "acquits herself with style and grace" on tunes like "In All the Right Places". James Hamilton from the Record Mirror Dance Update described it as an "attractive" and "swaying" ballad. Damon Albarn and Alex James of Blur reviewed the song for Smash Hits, giving it a full score of five out of five. James said, "I think this is really good. She's really British. She's our Whitney Houston. It's so tasteful, understated and undramatic."

== Music video ==
A black-and-white music video was produced to promote the single, directed by English photographer Nick Brandt. It depicts Stansfield lying on a divan while she performs the song. In between, there are clips from the Indecent Proposal movie (also they are in black-and-white). In other scenes, the singer stands in the room and/or leans towards the wall. Later she is seen hovering in the air over the divan, while she sings. The video was later made available on Stansfield's official YouTube channel in November 2009.

== Track listings ==
- UK CD single
1. "In All the Right Places" (Edit) – 5:17
2. "In All the Right Places" (Soul Mix) – 6:03
3. "Someday (I'm Coming Back)" (Classic 12" Club Mix) – 7:43
4. "Someday (I'm Coming Back)" (Classic Reprise Mix) – 5:48
- UK 7-inch single
1. "In All the Right Places" (Edit) – 5:17
2. "In All the Right Places" (Soul Mix) – 6:03
- UK 12-inch single
1. "In All the Right Places" (Soul Mix) – 6:03
2. "Someday (I'm Coming Back)" (Classic 12" Club Mix) – 7:43
3. "Someday (I'm Coming Back)" (Classic Reprise Mix) – 5:48
- European CD single
1. "In All the Right Places" (Edit) – 5:17
2. "In All the Right Places" (Soul Mix) – 6:03
3. "In All the Right Places" (Instrumental) – 3:10

== Charts ==
=== Weekly charts ===
Chart (1993)	Peak position
Australia (ARIA)	132
Canada Adult Contemporary (RPM)	26
Europe (Eurochart Hot 100)	24
Europe (European Hit Radio)	8
Germany (Official German Charts)	63
Ireland (IRMA)	8
Israel (Israeli Singles Chart)	7
Netherlands (Dutch Top 40)	20
Netherlands (Single Top 100)	24
Portugal (AFP)	4
UK Singles (Official Charts)	8
UK Airplay (Music Week)	6
UK Dance (Music Week)	10

=== Year-end charts ===
Chart (1993)	Position
Netherlands (Dutch Top 40)	160
UK Singles (OCC)	60
UK Airplay (Music Week)	46

== Release history ==
Region	Date	Format(s)	Label(s)	Ref.
United Kingdom	24 May 1993	7-inch vinyl; 12-inch vinyl; CD; cassette	MCA	
Australia	5 July 1993	CD; cassette	MCA	
