= Dream Away (Babyface and Lisa Stansfield song) =

Single by Babyface and Lisa Stansfield

from the album The Pagemaster
- Released: November 7, 1994
- Recorded: 1994
- Genre: Pop; R&B; soul
- Length: 4:38
- Label: Fox Records
- Songwriter: Diane Warren
- Producer: David Foster

Babyface singles chronology
"Where Is My Love?" (1994)	"Dream Away" (1994)	"Someone to Love" (1995)

Lisa Stansfield singles chronology
"Make It Right" (1994)	"Dream Away" (1994)	"People Hold On (The Bootleg Mixes)" (1997)

Music video
- "Dream Away" on YouTube

"Dream Away" is a song recorded by American singer Babyface and English singer Lisa Stansfield for the soundtrack to the 1994 animated film The Pagemaster. It was written by Diane Warren and produced by David Foster. Released as a single in the United States on November 7, 1994, by Fox Records, it reached number nine on the Billboard Bubbling Under Hot 100 Singles chart and number eighty on the Billboard Hot R&B/Hip-Hop Songs chart. "Dream Away" was also issued in selected European countries and Australia, and on January 21, 1995, it was released in Japan. The song was remixed by Dave Way, Paul Waller and Ollie Marland. The accompanying music video, directed by Randee St. Nicholas, featured Babyface, Stansfield and fragments from the film. In 2003, "Dream Away" was included on the remastered edition of Stansfield's third album, So Natural (1993).

== Critical reception ==
The song received positive reviews from music critics. Larry Flick from Billboard magazine wrote, "Is it possible to conceive a more inspired duet? Babyface and Stansfield's creamy voices are a perfect match, lending dimension to an otherwise familiar slice of pop romance from the soundtrack to The Pagemaster. Track's ballad setting is coated with slick strings and sugary synths that build to a fine climax". Pan-European magazine Music & Media deemed it as a "definition of M.O.R.-type of ballad out of Diane Warren's big songbook". James Hunter from Vibe noted that "the super-engaging Babyface and Lisa Stansfield outdo most big-time duos" on "Dream Away", "singing the praises of the imagination".

== Track listings ==
- Australian/Japanese CD single
1. "Dream Away" (Single Version) – 4:35
2. "Dream Away" (Acoustic Mix) – 4:38
- European CD single
1. "Dream Away" (Single Version) – 4:35
2. "Dream Away" (Waller and Marland Remix) – 4:51
3. "Marvellous & Mine" (Sure Is Pure 12" Edit) – 8:28
- US CD single
1. "Dream Away" (Single Version) – 4:35
2. "Dream Away" (R&B Remix) – 4:39
3. "Dream Away" (Acoustic Mix) – 4:38

== Charts ==
Chart (1994–1995)	Peak position
US Bubbling Under Hot 100 (Billboard)	9
US Hot R&B/Hip-Hop Songs (Billboard)	80
US Cash Box Top 100	84
