= So Natural (Lisa Stansfield album) =

Studio album by Lisa Stansfield
- Released: 8 November 1993
- Recorded: 1992–1993
- Studio: Windmill Lane Studios (Dublin, Ireland)
- Genre: R&B; dance-pop; adult contemporary
- Length: 63:24
- Label: Arista
- Producer: Ian Devaney; Lisa Stansfield; Bobby Boughton; Andy Morris

Lisa Stansfield chronology
| Five Live (1993) | So Natural (1993) | In Session (1996) |

Singles from So Natural
- 1. "In All the Right Places" Released: 24 May 1993; 2. "So Natural" Released: 11 October 1993; 3. "Little Bit of Heaven" Released: 29 November 1993; 4. "Marvellous & Mine" Released: 21 July 1994

So Natural is the third solo studio album by British singer Lisa Stansfield, released by Arista Records on 8 November 1993. Stansfield wrote songs for the album with her husband Ian Devaney, who also produced the tracks. Three songs were co-written by Andy Morris, who worked with Stansfield on Affection (1989) and Real Love (1991). So Natural garnered positive reviews from music critics and performed moderately on the charts, reaching number six in the United Kingdom and receiving Platinum certification. The album was not released in North America. On 10 November 2014, in the United Kingdom, and on 21 November 2014, in Europe, So Natural was reissued as a deluxe 2CD + DVD collection.

== Background ==
Lisa Stansfield released So Natural in November 1993, two years after her previous studio album, Real Love. During that time, she recorded "Someday (I'm Coming Back)" for The Bodyguard: Original Soundtrack Album and released it as a single which reached number ten in the United Kingdom in December 1992. She also wrote a song for Dionne Warwick, "Friends Can Be Lovers", which was produced by Ian and Andy along with another song written by Diane Warren, "Much Too Much". Lisa sang background vocals on both tracks, which appear on the 1993 Dionne Warwick album Friends Can Be Lovers. Later, her live duet with George Michael and Queen on "These Are the Days of Our Lives" was included on Five Live. Released in April 1993, this EP reached number one in the United Kingdom. The duet was recorded in April 1992, during The Freddie Mercury Tribute Concert where Stansfield also performed "I Want to Break Free". In April 1993, the soundtrack to the Indecent Proposal was issued and included new song co-written and recorded by Stansfield, "In All the Right Places". The music was composed by John Barry who also composed the soundtracks for eleven of the James Bond films. In May 1993, "In All the Right Places" was released as the lead single from the soundtrack and peaked at number eight in the United Kingdom. Later, a new version of the song was included on So Natural.

== Content ==
In November 1993, So Natural with thirteen songs was released in Europe and Australia. In Japan, the album was issued with a bonus track, "Gonna Try It Anyway". The songs were written by Stansfield and Ian Devaney, and Andy Morris co-wrote three of them: "Marvellous & Mine", "Turn Me On" and "In All the Right Places". The album was produced by Devaney, with Stansfield and Bobby Boughton being the associate producers. So Natural also contains a cover of Gloria Scott's 1974 song, "(A Case Of) Too Much Love Makin'", retitled "Too Much Love Makin'". In 2003, the album was remastered and re-released as limited edition digipak with three bonus songs: "Gonna Try It Anyway", "Dream Away" (duet with Babyface) and "So Natural" (No Presevatives Mix by Roger Sanchez).

So Natural was remastered and expanded, and was re-released as a deluxe 2CD + DVD set in November 2014. It was expanded to feature "Someday (I'm Coming Back)" from The Bodyguard: Original Soundtrack Album, rare tracks and 12" mixes plus videos, live footage and a specially recorded interview with Stansfield. The twenty-eight-page booklet features photos, memorabilia, lyrics and brand new sleeve notes. The set was issued in the United Kingdom on 10 November 2014 and in Europe on 21 November 2014. It was also released as a part of The Collection 1989–2003 at the same time. The 2014 reissue of So Natural includes a previously unreleased track, "I Give You Everything" (U.S. Remix).

== Singles ==
After "In All the Right Places", which was originally included on the Indecent Proposal: Music from the Original Motion Picture Soundtrack and reached number eight in the United Kingdom, Stansfield released the first proper single from the album, "So Natural". The single, with various remixes of the song, was issued in October 1993 and reached number fifteen in the United Kingdom. The next single, "Little Bit of Heaven" was released in November 1993 and peaked at number thirty-two in the United Kingdom. It included "Gonna Try It Anyway", which was available on the Japanese edition of So Natural only, and remixes of "Little Bit of Heaven". The last single, "Marvellous & Mine" was issued in Japan in July 1994. "I Give You Everything" (U.S. Remix), planned as a single for the US market was shelved as the album wasn't released there. In 2003, "In All the Right Places", "So Natural" and "Little Bit of Heaven" were featured on Biography: The Greatest Hits. Remixes and "Gonna Try It Anyway" were included on So Natural deluxe 2CD + DVD set in 2014 and also on The Collection 1989–2003.

== Critical reception ==
Professional ratings
Review scores
| Source | Rating |
|---|---|
| AllMusic | 2.5/5 stars |
| Robert Christgau | (choice cut) |
| The Independent | (mixed) |
| Select | 3/5 medals |

The album received positive reviews from music critics. According to William Cooper from AllMusic, Stansfield "almost abandon[ed] the R&B-flavored dance-pop" of her previous releases with So Natural. He also called the album "consistent" but noted its "ballad-heavy approach wears thin", saying it "lacks a surefire hit single" but offers "many pleasant moments". Cooper also remarked that "the steamy ballads 'Never Set Me Free' and 'Be Mine' rank with Stansfield's best work, and the album does offer a couple of sunny, up-tempo numbers with "Too Much Love Makin'" and "Marvellous & Mine". Cooper also observed that So Natural could have easily found an American audience, considering the success of her previous work, and its lack of an American release "remains a mystery." According to Nigel Williamson, So Natural is Stansfield's "most sophisticated and mature set to date". Lyrically, the songs are all linked by the theme of love but musically the diversity is "breathtaking. "Marvellous & Mine" harks back to the 70s disco-funk on which Stansfield was raised. "Goodbye" is one of her most potent soul ballads and "Never Set Me Free" is a storming tune and one of her most passionate performances. 'Little Bit of Heaven' has a classic dance-floor groove and displays another side of Stansfield's talent." Other highlights include: the "irresistible" title track, the "romantic" "In All the Right Places", the "sassy" "Be Mine", the "sensual" "Too Much Love Makin'" and the "seductive" "Turn Me On".

== Commercial reception ==
So Natural was the most successful in the United Kingdom where it peaked at number six and achieved Platinum certification. In other European countries, it reached top forty: number twenty-four in Sweden, twenty-five in Germany, twenty-seven in Switzerland, thirty in Austria and thirty-three in the Netherlands. In other parts of the world, So Natural peaked at number fifty in Japan and sixty-seven in Australia.

== Track listing ==
| No. | Title | Writer(s) | Producer(s) | Length |
|---|---|---|---|---|
| 1. | "So Natural" | Lisa Stansfield, Ian Devaney | Devaney, Stansfield, Bobby Boughton | 5:05 |
| 2. | "Never Set Me Free" | Stansfield, Devaney | Devaney, Stansfield, Boughton | 5:00 |
| 3. | "I Give You Everything" | Stansfield, Devaney | Devaney, Stansfield, Boughton | 4:40 |
| 4. | "Marvellous & Mine" | Stansfield, Devaney, Andy Morris | Devaney, Stansfield, Boughton | 4:14 |
| 5. | "Goodbye" | Stansfield, Devaney | Devaney, Stansfield, Boughton | 4:35 |
| 6. | "Little Bit of Heaven" | Stansfield, Devaney | Devaney, Stansfield, Boughton | 4:27 |
| 7. | "Sweet Memories" | Stansfield, Devaney | Devaney, Stansfield, Boughton | 5:32 |
| 8. | "She's Always There" | Stansfield, Devaney | Devaney, Stansfield, Boughton | 5:04 |
| 9. | "Too Much Love Makin'" | Tom Brock | Devaney, Stansfield, Boughton | 4:34 |
| 10. | "Turn Me On" | Stansfield, Devaney, Morris | Devaney, Stansfield, Boughton | 4:39 |
| 11. | "Be Mine" | Stansfield, Devaney | Devaney, Stansfield, Boughton | 4:32 |
| 12. | "In All the Right Places" | John Barry, Stansfield, Devaney, Morris | Devaney, Morris | 6:03 |
| 13. | "Wish It Could Always Be This Way" | Stansfield, Devaney | Devaney, Stansfield, Boughton | 4:43 |

Japanese bonus track
| No. | Title | Writer(s) | Producer(s) | Length |
|---|---|---|---|---|
| 14. | "Gonna Try It Anyway" | Stansfield, Devaney | Devaney, Stansfield, Boughton | 3:53 |

2003 remastered edition bonus tracks
| No. | Title | Writer(s) | Producer(s) | Length |
|---|---|---|---|---|
| 14. | "Gonna Try It Anyway" | Stansfield, Devaney | Devaney, Stansfield, Boughton | 3:53 |
| 15. | "Dream Away" (Duet with Babyface) | Diane Warren | David Foster | 4:38 |
| 16. | "So Natural" (No Presevatives Mix by Roger Sanchez) | Stansfield, Devaney | Devaney, Stansfield, Boughton | 6:42 |

2014 expanded 2CD + DVD set (disc one - CD)
| No. | Title | Writer(s) | Producer(s) | Length |
|---|---|---|---|---|
| 1. | "So Natural" | Stansfield, Devaney | Devaney, Stansfield, Boughton | 5:05 |
| 2. | "Never Set Me Free" | Stansfield, Devaney | Devaney, Stansfield, Boughton | 5:00 |
| 3. | "I Give You Everything" | Stansfield, Devaney | Devaney, Stansfield, Boughton | 4:40 |
| 4. | "Marvellous & Mine" | Stansfield, Devaney, Andy Morris | Devaney, Stansfield, Boughton | 4:14 |
| 5. | "Goodbye" | Stansfield, Devaney | Devaney, Stansfield, Boughton | 4:35 |
| 6. | "Little Bit of Heaven" | Stansfield, Devaney | Devaney, Stansfield, Boughton | 4:27 |
| 7. | "Sweet Memories" | Stansfield, Devaney | Devaney, Stansfield, Boughton | 5:32 |
| 8. | "She's Always There" | Stansfield, Devaney | Devaney, Stansfield, Boughton | 5:04 |
| 9. | "Too Much Love Makin'" | Brock | Devaney, Stansfield, Boughton | 4:34 |
| 10. | "Turn Me On" | Stansfield, Devaney, Morris | Devaney, Stansfield, Boughton | 4:39 |
| 11. | "Be Mine" | Stansfield, Devaney | Devaney, Stansfield, Boughton | 4:32 |
| 12. | "In All the Right Places" | Barry, Stansfield, Devaney, Morris | Devaney, Morris | 6:03 |
| 13. | "Wish It Could Always Be This Way" | Stansfield, Devaney | Devaney, Stansfield, Boughton | 4:43 |
| 14. | "Gonna Try It Anyway" | Stansfield, Devaney | Devaney, Stansfield, Boughton | 3:53 |
| 15. | "So Natural" (Be Boy Mix) | Stansfield, Devaney | Devaney, Stansfield, Boughton | 5:19 |
| 16. | "Little Bit of Heaven" (Bad Yard Club Mix) | Stansfield, Devaney | Devaney, Stansfield, Boughton | 7:27 |

2014 expanded 2CD + DVD set (disc two - CD)
| No. | Title | Writer(s) | Producer(s) | Length |
|---|---|---|---|---|
| 1. | "Someday (I'm Coming Back)" | Stansfield, Devaney, Morris | Devaney, Morris | 5:34 |
| 2. | "In All the Right Places" (Soundtrack Version) | Barry, Stansfield, Devaney, Morris | Devaney, Morris | 5:46 |
| 3. | "So Natural" (U.S. Remix) | Stansfield, Devaney | Devaney, Stansfield, Boughton | 5:25 |
| 4. | "I Give You Everything" (U.S. Remix) | Stansfield, Devaney | Devaney, Stansfield, Boughton | 4:46 |
| 5. | "Little Bit of Heaven" (Junior Vocal Mix) | Stansfield, Devaney | Devaney, Stansfield, Boughton | 6:43 |
| 6. | "Someday (I'm Coming Back)" (Absolute Remix) | Stansfield, Devaney, Morris | Devaney, Morris | 5:34 |
| 7. | "So Natural" (No Preservatives Mix) | Stansfield, Devaney | Devaney, Stansfield, Boughton | 7:27 |
| 8. | "Little Bit of Heaven" (Seventh Heaven Vocal Mix) | Stansfield, Devaney | Devaney, Stansfield, Boughton | 6:21 |
| 9. | "Marvellous & Mine" (Sure Is Pure Mix) | Stansfield, Devaney, Morris | Devaney, Stansfield, Boughton | 9:43 |
| 10. | "So Natural" (Roger's Club Mix) | Stansfield, Devaney | Devaney, Stansfield, Boughton | 5:41 |
| 11. | "Little Bit of Heaven" (Roach Motel Dub) | Stansfield, Devaney | Devaney, Stansfield, Boughton | 9:06 |
| 12. | "Someday (I'm Coming Back)" (Classic 12" Club Mix) | Stansfield, Devaney, Morris | Devaney, Morris | 7:43 |

2014 expanded 2CD + DVD set (disc three - DVD)
| No. | Title | Writer(s) | Producer(s) | Length |
|---|---|---|---|---|
| 1. | "Someday (I'm Coming Back)" (Promo Video) | Stansfield, Devaney, Morris | Devaney, Morris |
| 2. | "In All the Right Places" (Promo Video) | Barry, Stansfield, Devaney, Morris | Devaney, Morris |
| 3. | "So Natural" (Promo Video) | Stansfield, Devaney | Devaney, Stansfield, Boughton |
| 4. | "Little Bit of Heaven" (Promo Video) | Stansfield, Devaney | Devaney, Stansfield, Boughton |
| 5. | "So Natural" (Natural Cut Version) (Promo Video) | Stansfield, Devaney | Devaney, Stansfield, Boughton |
| 6. | "2014 Interview with Mark Goodier" |

== Charts ==
=== Weekly charts ===
Weekly chart performance for So Natural
| Chart (1993) | Peak position |
|---|---|
| Australian Albums (ARIA) | 67 |
| Austrian Albums (Ö3 Austria) | 30 |
| Dutch Albums (Album Top 100) | 33 |
| European Albums (Top 100) | 14 |
| German Albums (Offizielle Top 100) | 25 |
| Japanese Albums (Oricon) | 50 |
| Swedish Albums (Sverigetopplistan) | 24 |
| Swiss Albums (Schweizer Hitparade) | 27 |
| UK Albums (OCC) | 6 |

=== Year-end charts ===
Year-end chart performance for So Natural
| Chart (1993) | Position |
|---|---|
| UK Albums (OCC) | 58 |

== Certifications ==
| Region | Certification | Certified units/sales |
|---|---|---|
| United Kingdom (BPI) | Platinum | 300,000^{^} |
^{^} Shipments figures based on certification alone.

== Credits and personnel ==
Credits taken from AllMusic.

- Jacqueline Anthony - strings
- Anna Biggin - strings
- Bobby Boughton - associate producer, engineer, mix
- Snake Davis - saxophone, flute
- Ian Devaney - producer, keyboards, guitar, bass, mix
- Clarence Dixon - strings
- Peter Dixon - strings
- Andy Gangadeen - drums
- Stephen Gibson - trumpet, flugelhorn
- Owen Gordon - strings
- Drusilla Harris - strings
- Chris Hoyle - strings
- Julia Hoyle - strings
- Steven Klein - photography
- Andrew Long - strings
- Aiden McGovern - engineer's assistant
- Aileen McLaughlin - background vocals
- Andy Morris - producer, keyboards, trumpet, flugelhorn
- Annie Ross - background vocals
- Andrew Scrivener - strings
- Snowboy - percussion
- Lisa Stansfield - associate producer, vocals, background vocals
- Richard Thirlwell - strings
- Simon Vance - strings

== Release history ==
| Region | Date | Label | Format | Catalog |
|---|---|---|---|---|
| Europe | 8 November 1993 | Arista | CD | 74321 17231 2 |
| Japan | 21 November 1993 | Arista | CD | BVCA-626 |
| United Kingdom | 2 June 2003 | Arista | Remastered CD | 28765 22382 9 |
| Europe | 27 February 2009 | Arista | Remastered CD | 88697 44284 2 |
| United Kingdom | 10 November 2014 | Edsel | 2CD+DVD | EDSG 8055 |
| Europe | 21 November 2014 | Edsel | 2CD+DVD | EDSG 8055 |
