= Lisa Stansfield =

British singer (born 1966)

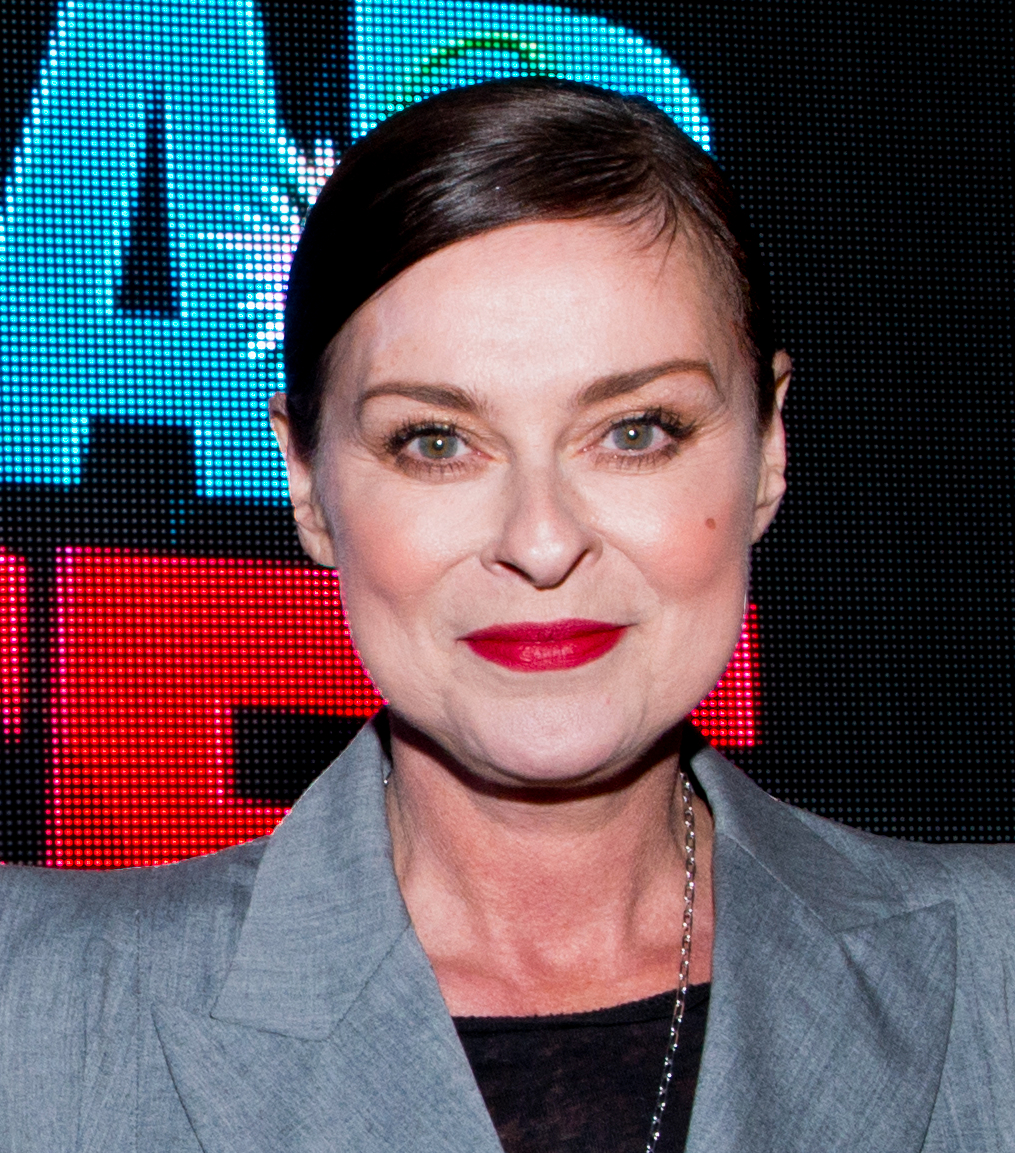
- Stansfield, at Sommarkrysset on Gröna Lund, Stockholm, 21 June 2014
- Born: Lisa Jane Stansfield; 11 April 1966 (age 60); Manchester, England
- Occupations: Singer; songwriter; actress
- Years active: 1980–present
- Spouses: Augusto Grassi (m. 1987; div. 1987) Ian Devaney (m. 1998)
- Musical career
- Genres: R&B; soul; blue-eyed soul; pop; dance
- Instrument: Vocals
- Labels: Arista/BMG; ZTT/Edel; Monkeynatra
- Website: lisastansfield.net

Lisa Jane Stansfield (born 11 April 1966) is an English singer, songwriter, and actress. Her career began in 1980 when she won the singing competition Search for a Star. After appearances in various television shows and releasing her first singles, Stansfield, along with Ian Devaney and Andy Morris, formed Blue Zone in 1983. The band released several singles and one album, but after the success of Coldcut's "People Hold On" in 1989, on which Stansfield was featured, the focus was placed on her solo career.

Stansfield's first solo album Affection (1989) and its worldwide chart-topping lead single "All Around the World" were major breakthroughs in her career. She was nominated for two Grammy Awards, and Affection is her best-selling album to date. In the following years, Stansfield released Real Love (1991), So Natural (1993), and Lisa Stansfield (1997). In 1999 she appeared in her first film, Swing, and also recorded the soundtrack for it. Her next albums included Face Up (2001), Biography: The Greatest Hits (2003), and The Moment (2004). Thereafter, Stansfield took a break from music and focused on her film career. In 2008, she starred in The Edge of Love and in 2014 she appeared in Northern Soul.

Stansfield released her seventh album Seven on 31 January 2014. Its lead single "Can't Dance" was digitally released on 16 October 2013. She promoted the album with the European Seven Tour in 2013 and 2014. Her most recent album Deeper was released on 6 April 2018. In June 2018, following a string of sold-out tour dates in Europe, Stansfield announced her North American Tour, which began in October 2018.

Stansfield has won numerous awards, including three Brit Awards, two Ivor Novello Awards, a Billboard Music Award, World Music Award, ASCAP Award, Women's World Award, Silver Clef Award and two DMC Awards. She has sold over 20 million albums worldwide, including five million of Affection. In December 2016, Billboard magazine ranked her as the 46th-most-successful dance artist of all time.

== Early life and career beginnings ==
Stansfield was born in Manchester, England, to Marion (died 27 September 2013) and Keith Stansfield. She has two sisters, Karen and Suzanne. Her family moved to Heywood in 1976, then to Rochdale in 1977. Stansfield attended Siddal Moor School (Heywood), Redbrook Middle School where she won the annual talent contest, and Oulder Hill Community School (both in Rochdale). She grew up listening to soul music, and stated that her mother's affinity for records by Diana Ross and the Supremes was her first musical influence, Stansfield citing Marvin Gaye, Chic and Barry White as other primary musical influences.

In 1980, Stansfield won the Search for a Star singing competition, held at the Talk of the Town nightclub. In 1981, her first single "Your Alibis" was released by Devil Records. In 1982, she appeared on the television show Bring Me the Head of Light Entertainment on Granada Television. At the same time, Stansfield signed a recording contract with Polydor Records.

In 1983, Johnnie Hamp produced for Granada Television a documentary directed by Pete Walker, Born in the Sixties: Lisa Stansfield. It was a profile of the aspiring singer, and it included her comments and those of her mother and sisters, and some songs sung by Stansfield. Also in 1983, she co-hosted the children's television music programme Razzamatazz and appeared on another children's television series The Krankies Klub. Between 1982 and 1983, Stansfield released her three new wave pop singles on Polydor: "The Only Way", "Listen to Your Heart", and "I Got a Feeling". Her early recordings were collected and released on the compilation album In Session in September 1996.

== Music career ==
=== 1984–1988: Blue Zone ===
In 1984, Stansfield and former schoolmates, Ian Devaney and Andy Morris, after having worked together on a school musical production ("Schizophrenia" (1982), directed by drama teacher Jeanette Dawson and described briefly by Alastair on the Manchester Digital Music Archive in 2007), began to collaborate musically and, in 1986, formed the band Blue Zone. They wrote some songs, produced a demo, and took it around to record labels. The small indie label Rockin' Horse Records signed them in 1985, and one year later the label was bought up by Arista Records. After releasing their first two singles in 1986, "Love Will Wait" and "Finest Thing", Arista issued "On Fire" in October 1987. Just as the single was climbing the charts (number ninety-nine in the United Kingdom), it was withdrawn by the record company in the wake of the King's Cross fire. The band's next single, "Thinking About His Baby," was released in January 1988 and reached number seventy-nine in the UK. Its B-side, "Big Thing," became popular on the radio and in the clubs.

In July 1988, "Jackie" was issued as a single outside the UK, reaching number thirty-seven on the Hot Dance Club Songs and number fifty-four on the Billboard Hot 100 in the United States. The release date for Blue Zone's album Big Thing, which was recorded in 1987, was pushed back many times by the record label. Finally, it was released outside the UK in November 1988 without any further promotion. The album included songs written by Blue Zone, except for "Jackie," which was written by Billy Steinberg and Tom Kelly. The album was produced by Paul Staveley O'Duffy, except for the track "Perfect Crime," which was produced by Blue Zone. Ric Wake also co-produced "Jackie" and "Perfect Crime."

=== 1989–1990: Affection ===
In early 1989, Stansfield co-wrote and recorded "People Hold On" for Coldcut's album What's That Noise? The single was released in March 1989, and reached number six on the Hot Dance Club Songs in the United States and number eleven in the United Kingdom. On the strength of this hit, Arista Records signed Stansfield to a solo deal. Her debut album Affection was released on 20 November 1989. Stansfield co-wrote all songs with Ian Devaney and Andy Morris. Devaney and Morris also produced the album, except for "This Is the Right Time," which was produced by Coldcut. Affection received critical acclaim from music critics, and was commercially successful. It reached the top ten on charts around the world, including number one in Austria and Italy, number two in the UK, Germany, Spain, Sweden and Switzerland, number three in Belgium, number five in New Zealand, number six in the Netherlands and Norway, and number seven in Australia and Canada. In the U.S., it peaked at number five on the Top R&B/Hip-Hop Albums, and number nine on the Billboard 200. The album has sold over five million copies worldwide and was certified 3× Platinum in the UK, Platinum in the U.S., Canada, Germany, Spain, Sweden and Switzerland, and Gold in France, Finland and Austria.

Affection includes Stansfield's biggest hit and signature song, "All Around the World". The track reached number one in many countries, including the UK, Austria, Belgium, Netherlands, Norway and Spain. In the U.S., "All Around the World" peaked at number one on the Hot Dance Club Songs and Hot R&B/Hip-Hop Songs, and reached number three on the Billboard Hot 100. The single was certified Platinum in the U.S. for selling over one million copies, and Gold in many other countries, including the UK, Germany, Australia, Sweden and Austria. In the UK, other singles from the album reached numbers ten ("Live Together"), thirteen ("This Is the Right Time") and twenty-five ("What Did I Do to You?") on the chart. In the U.S., "You Can't Deny It" peaked at number one on Hot R&B/Hip-Hop Songs, number two on Hot Dance Club Songs, and number fourteen on the Billboard Hot 100. "This Is the Right Time" reached number one on Hot Dance Club Songs, number thirteen on Hot R&B/Hip-Hop Songs, and number twenty-one on the Billboard Hot 100.

Stansfield also toured Europe and North America in 1990 in support of the album, and eventually released the Live! All Around the World home video. Thanks to Affection and "All Around the World," she received many awards, including the Brit Award, the Billboard Music Award, the World Music Award, the ASCAP Award, Ivor Novello Awards, Silver Clef Awards and DMC Awards. Stansfield was also nominated for two Grammy Awards in the Best New Artist and Best Female Pop Vocal Performance categories. Shortly after her success, she made two charity recordings. In December 1989, Stansfield was a part of Band-Aid II, a charity supergroup founded to raise money for anti-poverty efforts in Ethiopia, recording "Do They Know It's Christmas?," which topped the UK Singles Chart for three weeks. Later, she covered "Down in the Depths" for the AIDS charity compilation Red Hot + Blue, released in September 1990, and also filmed a music video for it.

=== 1991–1992: Real Love ===
In 1991, Stansfield recorded her second studio album Real Love, and released it on 11 November 1991. She co-wrote all the songs with Ian Devaney and Andy Morris, who also produced the album. Real Love received positive reviews from music critics and reached the top ten on the charts in various countries, including number three in the United Kingdom, number five in the Netherlands, number nine in Germany, and number ten in Belgium. In the United States, it peaked at number six on the Top R&B/Hip-Hop Albums and number forty-three on the Billboard 200. Real Love was certified 2× Platinum in the UK and Gold in the U.S., Canada, Germany, and Switzerland. The first single "Change" became a hit, peaking within the top ten in Italy, Belgium, Spain, Netherlands, Canada and the UK. In the U.S., it reached number one on the Hot Dance Club Songs, number twelve on the Hot R&B/Hip-Hop Songs and number twenty-seven on the Billboard Hot 100.

The second single from the Real Love album, "All Woman," peaked inside the top forty in various European countries, including number twenty in the UK. It was successful on the U.S. Hot R&B/Hip-Hop Songs chart, reaching number one in April 1992. On the Billboard Hot 100, "All Woman" reached number fifty-six. The next two singles released in Europe included "Time to Make You Mine" and "Set Your Loving Free," which peaked at numbers fourteen and twenty-eight in the UK. The last U.S. single, "A Little More Love," reached number thirty on the Hot R&B/Hip-Hop Songs. In 1992, Stansfield toured Europe, Asia and the United States, and released the Live at Wembley home video. In late 1992 she co-wrote and recorded "Someday (I'm Coming Back)" for the successful The Bodyguard: Original Soundtrack Album. The song was released as a single in Europe in December 1992, after "I Will Always Love You" by Whitney Houston, and reached top ten in the UK. She also wrote a song for Dionne Warwick, "Friends Can Be Lovers," which was produced by Ian and Andy along with another song written by Diane Warren, "Much Too Much." Lisa sang background vocals on both tracks, which appear on the 1993 Dionne Warwick album Friends Can Be Lovers.

=== 1993–1996: So Natural ===
In April 1993, George Michael released his charity EP, Five Live. It included "These Are the Days of Our Lives," recorded with Stansfield and Queen during The Freddie Mercury Tribute Concert in April 1992. Five Live was a success, reaching number one in the United Kingdom for three weeks. During the Freddie Mercury Tribute Concert, which was also released on VHS, Stansfield performed "I Want to Break Free," as well. In early 1993 she co-wrote and recorded "In All the Right Places," the theme song from the film Indecent Proposal, starring Robert Redford and Demi Moore. The single was issued in May 1993, and reached number eight in the UK and Ireland. It was later included on Stansfield's third studio album, So Natural, released on 8 November 1993.

So Natural garnered positive reviews from music critics, and performed moderately on the charts, reaching number six in the UK and receiving Platinum certification. It also peaked within the top forty in Italy, Sweden, Germany, Switzerland, Austria, and the Netherlands. The album was promoted by two singles, "So Natural" and "Little Bit of Heaven," which reached numbers fifteen and thirty-two in the UK. So Natural was not released in North America. In 1994, Stansfield toured Japan and the UK. In late 1994 she released two singles in the United States: "Make It Right" from the Beverly Hills 90210: The College Years soundtrack, and "Dream Away" (duet with Babyface) from the film The Pagemaster. Stansfield also recorded the following cover songs: "Friday's Child" for No Prima Donna: The Songs of Van Morrison (1994), "They Can't Take That Away from Me" for The Glory of Gershwin (1994), "Just to Keep You Satisfied" for Inner City Blues: The Music of Marvin Gaye (1995), and "Take Me Away" (duet with Aska) for One Voice: The Songs of Chage & Aska (1996).

=== 1997–2000: Lisa Stansfield ===
Her self-titled fourth studio album Lisa Stansfield was released on 21 March 1997. It garnered favourable reviews from music critics, and was commercially successful, reaching number two in the United Kingdom, number six in Belgium, and peaked inside the top forty in many European countries and Japan. It also received Gold certification in the UK, Spain, and Switzerland. In the United States the album peaked at number thirty on the Top R&B/Hip-Hop Albums, and fifty-five on the Billboard 200. Singles released in Europe included "People Hold On (The Bootleg Mixes)," "The Real Thing," "Never, Never Gonna Give You Up," and "The Line." They all entered the UK Singles Chart reaching numbers four, nine, twenty-five and sixty-four, respectively.

In the U.S., "Never, Never Gonna Give You Up" peaked at number seventy-four on the Billboard Hot 100, and at number one on the Billboard Top Dance Tracks. The album also spawned four number-one singles on the Billboard's Hot Dance Club Songs: "People Hold On (The Bootleg Mixes)," "Never, Never Gonna Give You Up," "Never Gonna Fall," and "I'm Leavin'." This success prompted Arista Records to release The Remix Album in June 1998. Stansfield toured South America, the U.S., and Europe in 1997 and 1998 to promote the album.

In July 1999, Stansfield's duet with Barry White "The Longer We Make Love" was released as a single from his album Staying Power.

In late 2000 she recorded two cover songs: "You Keep Me Hangin' On" for the Motown Mania album (released in December 2000), and "Somewhere My Baby Waits for Me" for The Wedding Planner soundtrack (released in January 2001).

=== 2001–2003: Face Up and Biography: The Greatest Hits ===
Stansfield released her fifth studio album Face Up on 20 June 2001. It featured funk and soul songs, and also the adventurous usage of 2-step garage beats on the lead single "Let's Just Call It Love." However, Face Up performed somewhat unsuccessfully on the charts, reaching top forty in only few countries, including Switzerland, Austria, Germany and the United Kingdom. It wasn't released in North America. Stansfield toured Europe in 2001 and 2002.

On 3 February 2003, Stansfield released her first greatest-hits album, Biography: The Greatest Hits. It reached number three in the United Kingdom (where it was certified Gold), number four in Italy, and also charted in other European countries. It was simultaneously issued on DVD. Stansfield toured Europe in March and April 2003 to promote the compilation. In June 2003, Arista Records remastered all of her studio albums and re-released them separately with bonus tracks. The Complete Collection, a six-CD box set, was issued simultaneously. In November 2003, she appeared on the soundtrack for the film Mona Lisa Smile, singing "I've Got the World on a String."

=== 2004–2012: The Moment ===
In 2004, Stansfield recorded "Too Hot" for Kool & the Gang's The Hits: Reloaded (released in April 2004), and "Breath In, Breath Out" (duet with Lââm) for her album titled simply Lââm (released in September 2004). After fulfilling her obligation to Arista Records, Stansfield signed with ZTT Records. The Grammy Award-winning Trevor Horn produced her next pop-oriented album, The Moment, which was released in the United Kingdom on 27 September 2004. It was well received by music critics, but failed commercially in the UK peaking at number fifty-seven. In February 2005, The Moment was issued in the rest of Europe by Edel, achieving moderate success on the charts in Austria, Germany, and Switzerland, reaching numbers fifteen, sixteen and twenty-two, respectively. It was also certified Gold in Germany. The album was promoted mainly by two singles: "Treat Me Like a Woman" and "If I Hadn't Got You." She also toured Europe in June and July 2005.

=== 2013–2016: Seven ===
Between May and July 2013, Stansfield toured Europe singing her greatest hits. On 13 August 2013, she announced that her seventh studio album titled simply Seven would be released on 21 October 2013. In October 2013, it was announced that the release date of the album had been pushed back to 31 January 2014 in Germany, and 10 February 2014 in the United Kingdom. The first single, "Can't Dance," premiered on Ken Bruce's BBC Radio 2 show on 14 August 2013, and was digitally released on 16 October 2013.

Seven, which was produced and written in the United Kingdom by Stansfield and Ian Devaney, features the tracks "Can't Dance," "The Rain," "Stupid Heart," "Conversation," "The Crown," "So Be It," and "Picket Fence." Recorded in both Los Angeles and Manchester, Stansfield collaborated with John Robinson and Grammy Award-winning orchestrator Jerry Hey, both integral to the creation of Michael Jackson's Off the Wall, Thriller, and Bad albums. "Carry On" was chosen as the second single, and its music video premiered on 31 January 2014. The album peaked at number 13 in the UK. A deluxe edition featuring bonus material was also released. Stansfield toured the United Kingdom in November 2013, and her Seven Tour continued in Europe in May and June 2014. The tour ended with a series of concerts in the United Kingdom in September 2014 and other European countries in October and November 2014. In October 2014, Seven was re-released as Seven+ including one new song and fifteen remixes.

In November 2014, Edsel Records released The Collection 1989–2003, a thirteen-CD and five-DVD box set, with five of Stansfield's studio albums and many rare additional tracks, remixes, promo videos, live concert footage, and new interviews. All albums were also released individually. The Live in Manchester album/video was released on 28 August 2015.

=== 2017–present: Deeper and touring ===
In October 2017, Stansfield announced her new album Deeper, and a European tour. It was released on 6 April 2018. In the UK, Deeper reached number 15 on the UK Albums Chart, while the single "Everything" reached number one on the Soul Chart. In the U.S., the single "Never Ever" reached number six on the Billboard Dance chart. This marked her first appearance on that chart in 20 years, after "I'm Leavin'" topped the chart in 1998.

In June 2018, following a string of tour dates in Europe, Stansfield announced her North American Tour to begin in October. Her first in North America in two decades, the tour began on 9 October in Toronto and included stops in Montreal, Boston, New York, Philadelphia, Atlanta, Chicago, Los Angeles, and more, before concluding in San Francisco on 26 October. In October 2019 Stansfield embarked on Affection 30th Anniversary Tour celebrating 30 years of her debut album. In November of that year the album was reissued on vinyl.

== Acting career ==
In May 1999, Stansfield made her film debut. She played Joan Woodcock in the Nick Mead-directed movie Swing, also starring Hugo Speer, and recorded songs for the soundtrack. The album, full of jazz and swing tracks, was released on 10 May 1999. Swing soundtrack received positive reviews from music critics, and peaked at number six on Billboard's Top Jazz Albums chart.

In February 2002, she made her stage debut in The Vagina Monologues at the Arts Theatre in the West End of London, together with Anita Dobson and Cecilia Noble. Stansfield played herself in the comedy series Monkey Trousers in mid-2005. In late 2006 she appeared in the drama series Goldplated, playing Trinny Jamieson.

In September 2007, Stansfield appeared in another television series, Agatha Christie's Marple. She played Mary Durrant in the episode titled Ordeal by Innocence. Stansfield dubbed one of the characters (Millie, an elf) for the English version of the Finnish animated film Quest for a Heart, released in December 2007. She also recorded the title song, written by Charlie Mole and Lee Hall. Stansfield joined the cast of the 2008 film The Edge of Love, directed by John Maybury, playing the role of Ruth Williams.

In 2009, she starred in the Nick Mead-directed documentary Dean Street Shuffle playing herself. In 2012, she performed a role in Elaine Constantine's film Northern Soul. Set in 1974, it is an independent docudrama about the social phenomenon and generation of the northern soul music and dance movement, and was released in 2014.

== Personal life ==
In 1987, Stansfield married Italian designer Augusto Grassi, whom she had met during a holiday in Tunisia. A ceremony was held in the Sacred Heart Church in Rochdale. The couple moved to Zagarolo, Italy, but their marriage lasted only four months. Following the end of the marriage, Stansfield returned to Britain. After many years of friendship and engagement, she and Ian Devaney married on 25 July 1998. The minimalist ceremony was held in Washington Square Park in New York City, and the only guests were her parents and his mother.

In 1998, Stansfield was named in a list of the biggest private financial donors to the Labour Party.

In 2008, Stansfield sold her six-bedroom Victorian house "Mount Henry" on Torca Road in Dalkey, Ireland, for €6 million to Yorkshire business tycoon Ed Clark.

== Discography ==
Studio albums

- Affection (1989)
- Real Love (1991)
- So Natural (1993)
- Lisa Stansfield (1997)
- Face Up (2001)
- The Moment (2004)
- Seven (2014)
- Deeper (2018)

== Filmography ==
- 1999: Swing
- 2005: Monkey Trousers
- 2006: Goldplated
- 2007: Agatha Christie's Marple
- 2007: Quest for a Heart
- 2008: The Edge of Love
- 2009: Dean Street Shuffle
- 2014: Northern Soul
