= So Natural (song) =

1993 single by Lisa Stansfield

Single by Lisa Stansfield

from the album So Natural
- Released: 11 October 1993
- Genre: Pop; soul
- Length: 5:05
- Label: Arista
- Songwriters: Lisa Stansfield; Ian Devaney
- Producer: Ian Devaney

Lisa Stansfield singles chronology
"In All the Right Places" (1993)	"So Natural" (1993)	"Little Bit of Heaven" (1993)

Music video
- "So Natural" on YouTube

"So Natural" is a song by British singer, songwriter and actress Lisa Stansfield from her third album, So Natural (1993). It was released as the first proper single in the United Kingdom on 11 October 1993 by Arista Records. The song was written by Stansfield and her husband Ian Devaney, and produced by Devaney. It received remixes by Roger Sanchez, DJ Duro, Frankie Foncett and Vassal Benford. The single peaked at number fifteen on the UK Singles Chart. Its music video was directed by Marcus Nispel.

In 2003, the song was included on Biography: The Greatest Hits. In 2014, the remixes of "So Natural" were included on the deluxe 2CD + DVD re-release of So Natural (also on The Collection 1989–2003).

== Chart performance ==
"So Natural" was a notable hit on the charts in Europe, entering the top 20 in the UK. The song peaked at number 15 in its first week on the UK Singles Chart on 17 October 1993. It stayed at that position for two weeks, before dropping to number 31 and then leaving the UK Top 40. "So Natural" also peaked at numbers seven and 20 on the Music Week Dance Singles and Airplay charts, and was a top-20 hit in both Italy (25) and Spain (25). Additionally, the single entered the top 40 in Iceland (36), as well as on the Eurochart Hot 100, where it peaked at number 38 in November same year. It also was a top-70 hit in Germany, while outside Europe, it charted in Australia, peaking within the top 70 also there (69).

== Critical reception ==
Upon the release, Larry Flick from Billboard magazine complimented the song as "quite nice". In his weekly UK chart commentary, James Masterton stated, "It's her tenth Top 20 hit in all and a natural Top Tenner for next week I would say." Pan-European magazine Music & Media wrote that "what Marvin requested, Lisa delivers. She seduces the lyrics in an almost underplayed way, only to see the slow rhythm teasingly broken by a vintage Barry White bridge." In a separate review, they also described it as "sophisticated" and "sensual". Alan Jones from Music Week gave it a score of four out of five, praising it as "another slow sophisticated track [that] provides a warm showcase for the exceptional Stansfield voice". R.S. Murthi from New Straits Times felt that the singer-songwriter "acquits herself with style and grace" on tunes like "So Natural".

== Retrospective response ==
Retrospectively, Quentin Harrison from Albumism stated that the song "emphasizes Stansfield's rich, honeyed tone; the plush arrangement recalls the pinnacle of early-to-mid '70s soul." In a 2015 review, Pop Rescue noted that "her breathy, soulful vocals, usher in this gentle ballad", and declared it as "a perfect showcase of her rich vocals".

== Music video ==
The accompanying music video for "So Natural" was directed by German feature film director and producer Marcus Nispel. It was later made available on Stansfield's official YouTube channel in 2009.

== Track listings ==
- UK CD and 12-inch single
1. "So Natural" (original version) – 4:42
2. "So Natural" (Be Boy mix) – 5:18
3. "So Natural" (Erotic Jeep Ride) – 5:17
4. "So Natural" (No Preservatives mix) – 7:30
5. "So Natural" (DJ Duro's hip hop mix) – 5:27
6. "So Natural" (U.S. remix) – 5:25
- UK 7-inch and cassette single
1. "So Natural" (original version) – 4:42
2. "So Natural" (Roger's club mix) – 5:41

- European CD and 12-inch single
1. "So Natural" (original version) – 4:42
2. "So Natural" (Be Boy mix) – 5:18
3. "So Natural" (DJ Duro's hip hop mix) – 5:27
- Japanese CD single
1. "So Natural" (original version) – 4:42
2. "So Natural" (U.S. remix) – 5:25

== Charts ==
Weekly chart performance for "So Natural"
Chart (1993)	Peak position
Australia (ARIA)	69
Europe (Eurochart Hot 100)	38
Europe (European Hit Radio)	14
Germany (Media Control)	67
Iceland (Íslenski Listinn Topp 40)	36
Israel (Israeli Singles Chart)	28
Italy (Musica e dischi)	25
Netherlands (Dutch Top 40 Tipparade)	6
Netherlands (Single Top 100)	47
Spain Radio (AFYVE)	25
UK Singles (Official Charts)	15
UK Airplay (Music Week)	20
UK Dance (Music Week)	7
UK Club Chart (Music Week)	21

== Release history ==
Release dates and formats for "So Natural"
Region	Date	Format(s)	Label(s)	Ref.
United Kingdom	11 October 1993	7-inch vinyl; 12-inch vinyl; CD; cassette	Arista	
Australia	1 November 1993	CD; cassette	Arista	
Japan	21 November 1993	Mini-CD	Arista	
