= Real Love (Lisa Stansfield album) =

Studio album by Lisa Stansfield
- Released: 11 November 1991
- Recorded: 1991
- Genre: R&B; soul; pop; dance; funk
- Length: 62:25
- Label: Arista
- Producer: Ian Devaney; Andy Morris

Lisa Stansfield chronology
Affection (1989)	Real Love (1991)	Five Live (1993)

Alternative cover
- Japanese cover

Singles from Real Love
- 1. "Change" Released: 7 October 1991; 2. "All Woman" Released: 9 December 1991; 3. "Time to Make You Mine" Released: 2 March 1992; 4. "Set Your Loving Free" Released: 25 May 1992; 5. "A Little More Love" Released: 30 June 1992

Real Love is the second solo studio album by English singer-songwriter and actress Lisa Stansfield, released on 11 November 1991, by Arista Records. Stansfield co-wrote all songs with Ian Devaney and Andy Morris, who also produced the album.

Upon release, Real Love received generally positive reviews from music critics and achieved commercial success. It reached the top-ten in various countries, including number three in the United Kingdom. Five singles were released from the album, including "Change" (number one on the US Dance Club Songs chart) and "All Woman" (number one on the US Hot R&B/Hip-Hop Songs chart).

Real Love was re-released as a deluxe 2 CD + DVD set in the United Kingdom on 10 November 2014 and in Europe on 21 November 2014.

== Background ==
Between her very successful debut album Affection and her next album Real Love, Stansfield recorded "Down in the Depths" which was written by Cole Porter in 1936. This track was included on the AIDS charity compilation Red Hot + Blue, released in September 1990. The music video was also filmed and directed by Philippe Gautier. In 2003, "Down in the Depths" was included on Stansfield's album, Biography: The Greatest Hits. Stansfield recorded the songs for Real Love in 1991.

== Content ==
The album was entirely written by Stansfield, Ian Devaney and Andy Morris, and produced by Devaney and Morris. It includes thirteen songs except for Japan where Real Love was issued with a bonus track, "Whenever You're Gone". The Japanese edition also has different cover art. The LP version of the album does not contain "First Joy", "Tenderly" and "A Little More Love". In North America, Real Love was released with different sequence of the tracks. In 2003, the album was remastered and re-released as limited edition digipak with three bonus songs: "Whenever You're Gone", "Everything Will Get Better" (from the single "All Woman") and "Change" remixed by Frankie Knuckles.

Real Love was remastered and expanded, and was re-released as a deluxe 2CD + DVD set in November 2014. It was expanded to feature rare tracks and 12" mixes plus videos, live footage and a specially recorded interview with Stansfield. The twenty-eight-page booklet features photos, memorabilia, lyrics and brand new sleeve notes. The set was issued in the United Kingdom on 10 November 2014 and in Europe on 21 November 2014. It was also released as a part of The Collection 1989–2003 at the same time. The 2014 reissue of Real Love includes the previously unreleased track "Time to Make You Mine" (Bomb Squad Remix). Additionally, People Hold On ... The Remix Anthology features another previously unreleased remix of "Time to Make You Mine"; the Sunship Mix.

== Singles ==
The first single, "Change" was released on 7 October 1991. In Europe, it became a hit reaching top ten in Italy, Belgium, Spain, Netherlands and the United Kingdom. In the United States, "Change" peaked at number one on the Hot Dance Club Songs, number twelve on the Hot R&B/Hip-Hop Songs, number thirteen on the Adult Contemporary Singles and number twenty-seven on the Billboard Hot 100. It also reached number ten in Canada. The second single, "All Woman" was issued on 9 December 1991. The song peaked inside top forty in the European countries, including Italy, United Kingdom, Netherlands, Belgium and Sweden. "All Woman" was successful on the Hot R&B/Hip-Hop Songs in the United States and topped this chart for one week. On the Billboard Hot 100, it reached number fifty-six and on the Adult Contemporary Singles, "All Woman peaked at number twenty-one. The single's B-side, "Everything Will Get Better" reached number thirty-six on the Hot Dance Club Songs. The third European single, "Time to Make You Mine" was released on 2 March 1992 and peaked inside top forty in the United Kingdom (number fourteen) and Switzerland (number thirty-three). "Set Your Loving Free" was issued as the fourth and last single in Europe and became another top forty hit, reaching number twenty-eight in the United Kingdom and number thirty-six in the Netherlands. The third US single, "A Little More Love" was released on 30 June 1992 and peaked at number thirty on the Hot R&B/Hip-Hop Songs. Its B-side, "Set Your Loving Free" reached number twenty on the Hot Dance Club Songs. In 2003, "Change", "All Woman", "Time to Make You Mine" and "Set Your Loving Free" were included on Biography: The Greatest Hits.

== Critical reception ==
Professional ratings
Review scores
Source	Rating
AllMusic	3/5 stars
Calgary Herald	B+
Robert Christgau	(choice cut)
Entertainment Weekly	A
Musician	(favorable)
NME	6/10
The New York Times	(favorable)
Orlando Sentinel	2/3 stars
Q	4/5 stars
Rolling Stone	4/5 stars
Smash Hits	7/10

Real Love received positive reviews from music critics. Alex Henderson from AllMusic wrote that the album contains "definite gems", "including the poignant and heartbreaking ballad 'All Woman,' the spunky 'Soul Deep' and the sleek 'Set Your Loving Free.'" He added that Real Love is "far superior to most '90s R&B" and Stansfield is a "major talent". Dave Obee from Calgary Herald said, "Believe the title. It's telling the truth. [...] This time around, she's singing about love again but, by golly, she sounds like she means it. There's real passion. As if she's actually singing about her own life. And yes, she has a great voice that suits the funky dance music. Really." Marisa Fox from Entertainment Weekly found that with the album, "Stansfield prove[d] she isn't just another soul crooner with robust vocals and an air of longing. The aptly titled Real Love is a collection of steamy love songs, accented with flutes, horns, and sometimes, lush, Barry White-like orchestration. Stansfield has cut out slogans in favor of meaty personal politics, taking a more clinical look at what triggers her emotions. On 'Symptoms of Loneliness and Heartache,' she reaches deep down in her heart (and throat) to tell an ex: 'I don't see emotion or quality of life/Just symptoms of loneliness and heartache.' And yet she isn't afraid to cut loose, as on 'It's Got to Be Real.' Ultimately, Stansfield comes off as a hopeless romantic who has all the strength and determination to convert even the worst cynic." Parry Gettelman from Orlando Sentinel stated that "Stansfield's brand of dance-pop still outclasses most of the genre."

Stephen Holden from Rolling Stone wrote that Stansfield is "one of the first British stars to redo American pop-soul styles of the Seventies. Shaped with the help of her songwriting and producing collaborators Ian Devaney and Andy Morris, her retro disco crossbreeds the harmonic vocabulary of mid-Seventies Philly soul with the lush, cheesy textures of Barry White and his Love Unlimited Orchestra. Up-to-the-minute electronic dance beats make it all sound contemporary. What makes the mix special is Stansfield's wantonly emotive singing, which is "as luscious as melting chocolate." On her second album, her voice is even richer and the arrangements more inventive and far-reaching than on Affection, her 1989 debut. The new album's gem, 'All Woman' is an almost overripe ballad about a long-suffering wife that sounds tailor-made for Gladys Knight, although Knight would have a hard time topping Stansfield's version. Like everything else on the album, from the trancelike disco prayer of the title track to the inspirational lover's promise 'Set Your Loving Free,' Real Love turns the world into a 'gold-and-velvet-trimmed valentine box in which romantic dreams are all that matter.'" According to Q, the album is "excellent" and Musician stated that it is a "knockout" with "shrewd and heartfelt music". The New York Times wrote that Stansfield brings danceable mid-1970s-style pop to a "pinnacle of musical sophistication and emotional heat." Robert Christgau chose "All Woman" as the best track on the album. According to CD Universe, Real Love features a "number of top-notch tunes, most notably the hit singles 'Change' and 'All Woman.' While the former song plays up the energetic, club-oriented aspect of Stansfield's aesthetic, the latter number is a R&B ballad that reinforces the vocalist's reputation as one of England's finest blue-eyed soul acts. The album's true charm, however, lies in its underrated album cuts, particularly the celebratory 'Soul Deep,' which includes funky Stevie Wonder-like keyboard lines, and the emotive string-tinged title track."

== Commercial performance ==
The album was commercially successful and reached top ten in the following European countries: United Kingdom (number three), Netherlands (number five), Germany (number nine) and Belgium (number ten). In other parts of Europe, it peaked inside top forty. Real Love also reached number twenty-five in New Zealand, number thirty-eight in Japan and number forty in Australia. In the United States, it peaked at number six on the Top R&B/Hip-Hop Albums and number forty-three on the Billboard 200. It also reached number thirty-one in Canada. Real Love was certified 2× Platinum in the United Kingdom and Gold in the United States, Canada, Germany and Switzerland.

== Track listing ==
All tracks are written by Lisa Stansfield, Ian Devaney, Andy Morris and produced by Ian Devaney, Andy Morris

No.	Title	Length
1.	"Change"	5:39
2.	"Real Love"	5:01
3.	"Set Your Loving Free"	5:03
4.	"I Will Be Waiting"	5:03
5.	"All Woman"	5:17
6.	"Soul Deep"	4:10
7.	"Make Love to Ya"	4:54
8.	"Time to Make You Mine"	4:55
9.	"Symptoms of Loneliness & Heartache"	4:43
10.	"It's Got to Be Real"	5:17
11.	"First Joy"	4:25
12.	"Tenderly"	3:20
13.	"A Little More Love"	4:35

Japanese bonus track
No.	Title	Length
14.	"Whenever You're Gone"	4:06

2003 remastered edition bonus tracks
No.	Title	Length
14.	"Whenever You're Gone"	4:06
15.	"Everything Will Get Better"	5:00
16.	"Change" (Frankie Knuckles Remix)	6:29

2014 expanded 2CD + DVD set (disc one - CD)
No.	Title	Length
1.	"Change"	5:39
2.	"Real Love"	5:01
3.	"Set Your Loving Free"	5:03
4.	"I Will Be Waiting"	5:03
5.	"All Woman"	5:17
6.	"Soul Deep"	4:10
7.	"Make Love to Ya"	4:54
8.	"Time to Make You Mine"	4:55
9.	"Symptoms of Loneliness & Heartache"	4:43
10.	"It's Got to Be Real"	5:17
11.	"First Joy"	4:25
12.	"Tenderly"	3:20
13.	"A Little More Love"	4:35
14.	"Whenever You're Gone"	4:06
15.	"Time to Make You Mine" (Sugar Lips Mix)	6:43
16.	"Change" (Knuckles Mix)	6:29

2014 expanded 2CD + DVD set (disc two - CD)
No.	Title	Length
1.	"Set Your Loving Free" (Extended Version)	6:00
2.	"Everything Will Get Better" (Extended Mix)	8:04
3.	"Change" (Driza Bone Mix)	6:08
4.	"Time to Make You Mine" (Bomb Squad Remix)	5:12
5.	"Make Love to Ya" (The Floor Mix)	6:26
6.	"Everything Will Get Better" (Underground Club Mix)	9:54
7.	"Time to Make You Mine" (House Dub)	4:45
8.	"Set Your Loving Free" (Kenlou 12")	7:26
9.	"Everything Will Get Better" (Sax on the Beach Mix)	6:35
10.	"Time to Make You Mine" (Kenlou Supa Mix)	6:30
11.	"Set Your Loving Free" (Mellow Mix)	4:53
12.	"Change" (Misty Dub Mix)	7:23

All tracks are written by Lisa Stansfield, Ian Devaney, Andy Morris and produced by Ian Devaney, Andy Morris except where noted

2014 expanded 2CD + DVD set (disc three - DVD)
No.	Title	Writer(s)	Length
1.	"Change" (Promo Video)
2.	"All Woman" (Promo Video)
3.	"Time to Make You Mine" (Promo Video)
4.	"Set Your Loving Free" (Promo Video)
5.	"Change" (US Version) (Promo Video)
6.	"A Little More Love" (Promo Video)
7.	"'Tain't Nobody's Biz-ness if I Do" (Live)	Porter Grainger, Everett Robbins
8.	"All Woman" (Live)
9.	"2014 Interview with Mark Goodier"

== Personnel ==
Credits taken from AllMusic.

- Yak Bondy – keyboards, programming, harmonica
- Bobby Boughton – engineer, mixing
- Snake Davis – saxophones, flutes, horn arrangements
- Ian Devaney – producer, arranger, keyboards, guitars, programming, trombone, engineer, mixing
- Andy Gangadeen – drums, rhythm arrangements
- Stephen Gibson – trumpet, flugelhorn
- Rebecca Gilliver – strings
- Gary Grant – trumpets, flugelhorns
- Drusilla Harris – strings
- Jerry Hey – trumpets, flugelhorns, horn and string arrangements
- Dan Higgins – saxophones, flutes
- Benedict Holland – strings
- Aileen McLaughlin – background vocals
- Andy Morris – producer, arranger, keyboards, programming, trumpet, flugelhorn, engineer, mixing
- Berend Mulder – strings
- Jane Nossek – strings
- Tim Parry – executive producer
- John Price – strings
- Bill Reichenbach Jr. – trombones
- Annie Ross – background vocals
- Juliet Snell – strings
- Snowboy – percussion, rhythm arrangements
- Lisa Stansfield – vocals
- Jazz Summers – executive producer
- Winkie Thin – strings
- Richard Thirlwell – strings
- Rebecca Thompson – strings
- Jenny Turner – strings
- Max Vadukul – photography
- Simon Vance – strings, string arrangements
- Andrew Walton – strings
- Marcus Williams – bass
- Richard Williamson – strings

== Charts ==
=== Weekly charts ===
Chart (1991)	Peak position
Australian Albums (ARIA)	40
Austrian Albums (Ö3 Austria)	21
Canadian Albums (RPM)	31
Dutch Albums (Album Top 100)	5
European Albums (Top 100)	9
Finnish Albums (Suomen virallinen lista)	25
French Albums (SNEP)	23
German Albums (Offizielle Top 100)	9
Italian Albums (Hit Parade Italia)	17
Japanese Albums (Oricon)	38
New Zealand Albums (RMNZ)	25
Spanish Albums (PROMUSICAE)	41
Swedish Albums (Sverigetopplistan)	16
Swiss Albums (Schweizer Hitparade)	18
UK Albums (OCC)	3
US Billboard 200	43
US Top R&B/Hip-Hop Albums (Billboard)	6

=== Year-end charts ===
Chart (1991)	Position
UK Albums (OCC)	28
Italian Albums (Hit Parade Italia)	79
Chart (1992)	Position
Dutch Albums (Album Top 100)	22
French Albums (SNEP)	40
German Albums (Offizielle Top 100)	48
UK Albums (OCC)	17
US Billboard 200	97
US Top R&B/Hip-Hop Albums (Billboard)	18

== Certifications and sales ==
Region	Certification	Certified units/sales
Canada (Music Canada)	Gold	50,000^{^}
Germany (BVMI)	Gold	250,000^{^}
Netherlands (NVPI)	Platinum	100,000^{^}
Switzerland (IFPI Switzerland)	Gold	25,000^{^}
United Kingdom (BPI)	2× Platinum	600,000^{^}
United States (RIAA)	Gold	500,000^{^}
^{^} Shipments figures based on certification alone.

== Release history ==
Region	Date	Label	Format	Catalog
Europe	11 November 1991	Arista	CD, cassette, LP	262 300
Japan	15 November 1991	Arista	CD, cassette, LP	BVCA-124
North America	19 November 1991	Arista	CD, cassette, LP	07822-18679-2
Europe	2 June 2003	Arista	Remastered CD	82876 522252
United Kingdom	10 November 2014	Edsel	2CD+DVD	7 40155 80543 2
Europe	21 November 2014	Edsel	2CD+DVD	7 40155 80543 2
