= The Collection 1989–2003 =

2014 box set by Lisa Stansfield

Box set by Lisa Stansfield
- Released: 10 November 2014
- Recorded: 1989–2003
- Genres: R&B; soul; pop; disco; dance; funk; pop rock; acid house
- Label: Edsel

Lisa Stansfield chronology
People Hold On ... The Remix Anthology (2014)	The Collection 1989–2003 (2014)	Live in Manchester (2015)

The Collection 1989–2003 is a thirteen-CD and five DVD box set by British recording artist Lisa Stansfield. It was released by Edsel Records in the United Kingdom on 10 November 2014 and in Europe on 21 November 2014. It includes five of Stansfield's studio albums and additionally many rare tracks, remixes, promo videos, live concert footage and new interviews. All albums were also released individually on the same date.

== Content ==
This eighteen-disc box set brings together deluxe 2CD+DVD editions of Stansfield's albums recorded for Arista label: Affection (1989), Real Love (1991), So Natural (1993), Lisa Stansfield (1997) and Face Up (2001), plus the three-CD set People Hold On ... The Remix Anthology in a unique outer slipcase.

== Track listing ==
Affection (disc one – CD)
No.	Title	Writer(s)	Producer(s)	Length
1.	"This Is the Right Time"	Lisa Stansfield, Ian Devaney, Andy Morris	Coldcut	4:30
2.	"Mighty Love"	Stansfield, Devaney, Morris	Devaney, Morris	4:16
3.	"Sincerity"	Stansfield, Devaney, Morris	Devaney, Morris	4:48
4.	"The Love in Me"	Stansfield, Devaney, Morris	Devaney, Morris	5:02
5.	"All Around the World"	Stansfield, Devaney, Morris	Devaney, Morris	4:29
6.	"What Did I Do to You?"	Stansfield, Devaney, Morris	Devaney, Morris	4:50
7.	"Live Together"	Stansfield, Devaney, Morris	Devaney, Morris	6:10
8.	"You Can't Deny It"	Stansfield, Devaney, Morris	Devaney, Morris	5:31
9.	"Poison"	Stansfield, Devaney, Morris	Devaney, Morris	4:19
10.	"When Are You Coming Back?"	Stansfield, Devaney, Morris	Devaney, Morris	5:23
11.	"Affection"	Stansfield, Devaney, Morris	Devaney, Morris	5:52
12.	"Wake Up Baby"	Stansfield, Devaney, Morris	Devaney, Morris	3:54
13.	"The Way You Want It"	Stansfield, Devaney, Morris	Devaney, Morris	4:59
14.	"This Is the Right Time" (Miles Ahead Mix)	Stansfield, Devaney, Morris	Coldcut	7:45
15.	"All Around the World" (Long Version)	Stansfield, Devaney, Morris	Devaney, Morris	7:08

Affection (disc two – CD)
No.	Title	Writer(s)	Producer(s)	Length
1.	"My Apple Heart"	Stansfield, Devaney, Morris	Devaney, Morris	5:17
2.	"Lay Me Down"	Stansfield, Devaney, Morris	Devaney, Morris	4:21
3.	"Something's Happenin'"	Stansfield, Devaney, Morris	Devaney, Morris	3:57
4.	"Sing It"	Stansfield, Devaney, Morris	Devaney, Morris	5:32
5.	"This Is the Right Time" (Extended Version)	Stansfield, Devaney, Morris	Coldcut	5:40
6.	"All Around the World" (Around the House Mix)	Stansfield, Devaney, Morris	Devaney, Morris	6:03
7.	"Live Together" (Extended Version)	Stansfield, Devaney, Morris	Devaney, Morris	8:55
8.	"What Did I Do to You?" (Mark Saunders Remix)	Stansfield, Devaney, Morris	Devaney, Morris	5:52
9.	"You Can't Deny It" (Extended Version)	Stansfield, Devaney, Morris	Devaney, Morris	7:53
10.	"The Love in Me" (Extended Version)	Stansfield, Devaney, Morris	Devaney, Morris	7:06
11.	"This Is the Right Time" (Kick Mix)	Stansfield, Devaney, Morris	Coldcut	6:45
12.	"All Around the World" (Runaway Love Mix)	Stansfield, Devaney, Morris	Devaney, Morris	4:37
13.	"Live Together" (Home Sweet Home Mix)	Stansfield, Devaney, Morris	Devaney, Morris	7:42

Affection (disc three – DVD)
No.	Title	Writer(s)	Producer(s)	Length
1.	"People Hold On" (with Coldcut) (Promo Video)	Matt Black, Jonathan More, Stansfield	Coldcut
2.	"This Is the Right Time" (Promo Video)	Stansfield, Devaney, Morris	Coldcut
3.	"All Around the World" (Promo Video)	Stansfield, Devaney, Morris	Devaney, Morris
4.	"Live Together" (Promo Video)	Stansfield, Devaney, Morris	Devaney, Morris
5.	"What Did I Do to You?" (Promo Video)	Stansfield, Devaney, Morris	Devaney, Morris
6.	"You Can't Deny It" (Promo Video)	Stansfield, Devaney, Morris	Devaney, Morris
7.	"This Is the Right Time" (US Version) (Promo Video)	Stansfield, Devaney, Morris	Coldcut
8.	"This Is the Right Time" (Live! All Around the World)	Stansfield, Devaney, Morris	Coldcut
9.	"Mighty Love" (Live! All Around the World)	Stansfield, Devaney, Morris	Devaney, Morris
10.	"You Can't Deny It" (Live! All Around the World)	Stansfield, Devaney, Morris	Devaney, Morris
11.	"The Love in Me" (Live! All Around the World)	Stansfield, Devaney, Morris	Devaney, Morris
12.	"Sincerity" (Live! All Around the World)	Stansfield, Devaney, Morris	Devaney, Morris
13.	"Poison" (Live! All Around the World)	Stansfield, Devaney, Morris	Devaney, Morris
14.	"Live Together" (Live! All Around the World)	Stansfield, Devaney, Morris	Devaney, Morris
15.	"Good Morning Heartache" (Live! All Around the World)	Irene Higginbotham, Ervin Drake, Dan Fisher
16.	"What Did I Do to You?" (Live! All Around the World)	Stansfield, Devaney, Morris	Devaney, Morris
17.	"All Around the World" (Live! All Around the World)	Stansfield, Devaney, Morris	Devaney, Morris
18.	"People Hold On" (Live! All Around the World)	Black, More, Stansfield	Coldcut
19.	"Affection" (Live! All Around the World)	Stansfield, Devaney, Morris	Devaney, Morris
20.	"The Way You Want It" (Live! All Around the World)	Stansfield, Devaney, Morris	Devaney, Morris
21.	"2014 Interview with Mark Goodier"

Real Love (disc one – CD)
No.	Title	Writer(s)	Producer(s)	Length
1.	"Change"	Stansfield, Devaney, Morris	Devaney, Morris	5:39
2.	"Real Love"	Stansfield, Devaney, Morris	Devaney, Morris	5:01
3.	"Set Your Loving Free"	Stansfield, Devaney, Morris	Devaney, Morris	5:03
4.	"I Will Be Waiting"	Stansfield, Devaney, Morris	Devaney, Morris	5:03
5.	"All Woman"	Stansfield, Devaney, Morris	Devaney, Morris	5:17
6.	"Soul Deep"	Stansfield, Devaney, Morris	Devaney, Morris	4:10
7.	"Make Love to Ya"	Stansfield, Devaney, Morris	Devaney, Morris	4:54
8.	"Time to Make You Mine"	Stansfield, Devaney, Morris	Devaney, Morris	4:55
9.	"Symptoms of Loneliness & Heartache"	Stansfield, Devaney, Morris	Devaney, Morris	4:43
10.	"It's Got to Be Real"	Stansfield, Devaney, Morris	Devaney, Morris	5:17
11.	"First Joy"	Stansfield, Devaney, Morris	Devaney, Morris	4:25
12.	"Tenderly"	Stansfield, Devaney, Morris	Devaney, Morris	3:20
13.	"A Little More Love"	Stansfield, Devaney, Morris	Devaney, Morris	4:35
14.	"Whenever You're Gone"	Stansfield, Devaney, Morris	Devaney, Morris	4:06
15.	"Time to Make You Mine" (Sugar Lips Mix)	Stansfield, Devaney, Morris	Devaney, Morris	6:43
16.	"Change" (Knuckles Mix)	Stansfield, Devaney, Morris	Devaney, Morris	6:29

Real Love (disc two – CD)
No.	Title	Writer(s)	Producer(s)	Length
1.	"Set Your Loving Free" (Extended Version)	Stansfield, Devaney, Morris	Devaney, Morris	6:00
2.	"Everything Will Get Better" (Extended Mix)	Stansfield, Devaney, Morris	Devaney, Morris	8:04
3.	"Change" (Driza Bone Mix)	Stansfield, Devaney, Morris	Devaney, Morris	6:08
4.	"Time to Make You Mine" (Bomb Squad Remix)	Stansfield, Devaney, Morris	Devaney, Morris	5:12
5.	"Make Love to Ya" (The Floor Mix)	Stansfield, Devaney, Morris	Devaney, Morris	6:26
6.	"Everything Will Get Better" (Underground Club Mix)	Stansfield, Devaney, Morris	Devaney, Morris	9:54
7.	"Time to Make You Mine" (House Dub)	Stansfield, Devaney, Morris	Devaney, Morris	4:45
8.	"Set Your Loving Free" (Kenlou 12")	Stansfield, Devaney, Morris	Devaney, Morris	7:26
9.	"Everything Will Get Better" (Sax on the Beach Mix)	Stansfield, Devaney, Morris	Devaney, Morris	6:35
10.	"Time to Make You Mine" (Kenlou Supa Mix)	Stansfield, Devaney, Morris	Devaney, Morris	6:30
11.	"Set Your Loving Free" (Mellow Mix)	Stansfield, Devaney, Morris	Devaney, Morris	4:53
12.	"Change" (Misty Dub Mix)	Stansfield, Devaney, Morris	Devaney, Morris	7:23

Real Love (disc three – DVD)
No.	Title	Writer(s)	Producer(s)	Length
1.	"Change" (Promo Video)	Stansfield, Devaney, Morris	Devaney, Morris
2.	"All Woman" (Promo Video)	Stansfield, Devaney, Morris	Devaney, Morris
3.	"Time to Make You Mine" (Promo Video)	Stansfield, Devaney, Morris	Devaney, Morris
4.	"Set Your Loving Free" (Promo Video)	Stansfield, Devaney, Morris	Devaney, Morris
5.	"Change" (US Version) (Promo Video)	Stansfield, Devaney, Morris	Devaney, Morris
6.	"A Little More Love" (Promo Video)	Stansfield, Devaney, Morris	Devaney, Morris
7.	"'Tain't Nobody's Biz-ness if I Do" (Live)	Porter Grainger, Everett Robbins
8.	"All Woman" (Live)	Stansfield, Devaney, Morris	Devaney, Morris
9.	"2014 Interview with Mark Goodier"

So Natural (disc one – CD)
No.	Title	Writer(s)	Producer(s)	Length
1.	"So Natural"	Stansfield, Devaney	Devaney, Stansfield, Bobby Boughton	5:05
2.	"Never Set Me Free"	Stansfield, Devaney	Devaney, Stansfield, Boughton	5:00
3.	"I Give You Everything"	Stansfield, Devaney	Devaney, Stansfield, Boughton	4:40
4.	"Marvellous & Mine"	Stansfield, Devaney, Morris	Devaney, Stansfield, Boughton	4:14
5.	"Goodbye"	Stansfield, Devaney	Devaney, Stansfield, Boughton	4:35
6.	"Little Bit of Heaven"	Stansfield, Devaney	Devaney, Stansfield, Boughton	4:27
7.	"Sweet Memories"	Stansfield, Devaney	Devaney, Stansfield, Boughton	5:32
8.	"She's Always There"	Stansfield, Devaney	Devaney, Stansfield, Boughton	5:04
9.	"Too Much Love Makin'"	Tom Brock	Devaney, Stansfield, Boughton	4:34
10.	"Turn Me On"	Stansfield, Devaney, Morris	Devaney, Stansfield, Boughton	4:39
11.	"Be Mine"	Stansfield, Devaney	Devaney, Stansfield, Boughton	4:32
12.	"In All the Right Places"	John Barry, Stansfield, Devaney, Morris	Devaney, Morris	6:03
13.	"Wish It Could Always Be This Way"	Stansfield, Devaney	Devaney, Stansfield, Boughton	4:43
14.	"Gonna Try It Anyway"	Stansfield, Devaney	Devaney, Stansfield, Boughton	3:53
15.	"So Natural" (Be Boy Mix)	Stansfield, Devaney	Devaney, Stansfield, Boughton	5:19
16.	"Little Bit of Heaven" (Bad Yard Club Mix)	Stansfield, Devaney	Devaney, Stansfield, Boughton	7:27

So Natural (disc two – CD)
No.	Title	Writer(s)	Producer(s)	Length
1.	"Someday (I'm Coming Back)"	Stansfield, Devaney, Morris	Devaney, Morris	5:34
2.	"In All the Right Places" (Soundtrack Version)	Barry, Stansfield, Devaney, Morris	Devaney, Morris	5:46
3.	"So Natural" (US Remix)	Stansfield, Devaney	Devaney, Stansfield, Boughton	5:25
4.	"I Give You Everything" (US Remix)	Stansfield, Devaney	Devaney, Stansfield, Boughton	4:46
5.	"Little Bit of Heaven" (Junior Vocal Mix)	Stansfield, Devaney	Devaney, Stansfield, Boughton	6:43
6.	"Someday (I'm Coming Back)" (Absolute Remix)	Stansfield, Devaney, Morris	Devaney, Morris	5:34
7.	"So Natural" (No Preservatives Mix)	Stansfield, Devaney	Devaney, Stansfield, Boughton	7:27
8.	"Little Bit of Heaven" (Seventh Heaven Vocal Mix)	Stansfield, Devaney	Devaney, Stansfield, Boughton	6:21
9.	"Marvellous & Mine" (Sure Is Pure Mix)	Stansfield, Devaney, Morris	Devaney, Stansfield, Boughton	9:43
10.	"So Natural" (Roger's Club Mix)	Stansfield, Devaney	Devaney, Stansfield, Boughton	5:41
11.	"Little Bit of Heaven" (Roach Motel Dub)	Stansfield, Devaney	Devaney, Stansfield, Boughton	9:06
12.	"Someday (I'm Coming Back)" (Classic 12" Club Mix)	Stansfield, Devaney, Morris	Devaney, Morris	7:43

So Natural (disc three – DVD)
No.	Title	Writer(s)	Producer(s)	Length
1.	"Someday (I'm Coming Back)" (Promo Video)	Stansfield, Devaney, Morris	Devaney, Morris
2.	"In All the Right Places" (Promo Video)	Barry, Stansfield, Devaney, Morris	Devaney, Morris
3.	"So Natural" (Promo Video)	Stansfield, Devaney	Devaney, Stansfield, Boughton
4.	"Little Bit of Heaven" (Promo Video)	Stansfield, Devaney	Devaney, Stansfield, Boughton
5.	"So Natural" (Natural Cut Version) (Promo Video)	Stansfield, Devaney	Devaney, Stansfield, Boughton
6.	"2014 Interview with Mark Goodier"
7.	"2014 Interview with Mark Goodier"

Lisa Stansfield (disc one – CD)
No.	Title	Writer(s)	Producer(s)	Length
1.	"Never Gonna Fall"	Stansfield, Devaney	Ian Devaney, Peter Mokran	5:16
2.	"The Real Thing"	Stansfield, Devaney	Devaney, Mokran	4:20
3.	"I'm Leavin'"	Crayge Lindesay, Telisa Stinson	Devaney, Mokran	4:38
4.	"Suzanne"	Stansfield, Devaney	Devaney, Mokran	4:59
5.	"Never, Never Gonna Give You Up"	Barry White	Devaney, Mokran	5:02
6.	"Don't Cry for Me"	Stansfield, Devaney, Cory Rooney, Mark Morales	Devaney, Mokran, Rooney, Morales	5:03
7.	"The Line"	Stansfield, Devaney, Terry Gamwell	Devaney, Mokran	4:26
8.	"The Very Thought of You"	Stansfield, Devaney, Richard Darbyshire	Devaney, Mokran	5:23
9.	"You Know How to Love Me"	Reggie Lucas, James Mtume	Devaney, Mokran	5:32
10.	"I Cried My Last Tear Last Night"	Diane Warren	Devaney, Mokran	4:13
11.	"Honest"	Stansfield, Devaney, Darbyshire	Devaney, Mokran	4:54
12.	"Somewhere in Time"	Stansfield, Devaney, Darbyshire	Devaney, Mokran	4:44
13.	"Got Me Missing You"	Stansfield, Devaney	Devaney, Mokran	4:43
14.	"Footsteps"	Stansfield, Devaney, Darbyshire, Frank Musker	Devaney, Mokran	3:48
15.	"Baby Come Back"	J.C. Crowley, Peter Beckett	Devaney, Mokran	4:43
16.	"People Hold On" (Jon Is the Don Mix)	Stansfield, Black, More	Dan Bewick, Matt Frost	8:09

Lisa Stansfield (disc two – CD)
No.	Title	Writer(s)	Producer(s)	Length
1.	"The Real Thing" (Touch Extended Mix)	Stansfield, Devaney	Devaney, Mokran	6:27
2.	"Breathtaking"	Stansfield, Devaney	Devaney	4:50
3.	"You Get Me"	Stansfield, Devaney, Darbyshire	Devaney	5:37
4.	"Never, Never Gonna Give You Up" (77th Heaven Mix)	White	Devaney, Mokran	7:10
5.	"The Line" (Devaney & Mokran Mix)	Stansfield, Devaney, Gamwell	Devaney, Mokran	5:55
6.	"The Real Thing" (Silk's Real House Thang)	Stansfield, Devaney	Devaney, Mokran	9:45
7.	"Never, Never Gonna Give You Up" (Frankie's Hard R&B Club Mix)	White	Devaney, Mokran	6:54
8.	"The Line" (Hippie Torrales Mix)	Stansfield, Devaney, Gamwell	Devaney, Mokran	6:41
9.	"The Real Thing" (Dirty Rotten Scoundrels Vocal Mix)	Stansfield, Devaney	Devaney, Mokran	7:38
10.	"Never, Never Gonna Give You Up" (Nikolas & Sibley Club Mix)	White	Devaney, Mokran	8:36
11.	"Never Gonna Fall" (Junior's Return To 27th & 10th Anthem)	Stansfield, Devaney	Devaney, Mokran	10:23

Lisa Stansfield (disc three – DVD)
No.	Title	Writer(s)	Producer(s)	Length
1.	"The Real Thing" (Promo Video)	Stansfield, Devaney	Devaney, Mokran
2.	"Never, Never Gonna Give You Up" (Promo Video)	White	Devaney, Mokran
3.	"The Line" (Promo Video)	Stansfield, Devaney, Gamwell	Devaney, Mokran
4.	"Don't Cry for Me" (Promo Video)	Stansfield, Devaney, Rooney, Morales	Devaney, Mokran, Rooney, Morales
5.	"People Hold On" (Bootleg Mix) (Promo Video)	Stansfield, Black, More	Bewick, Frost
6.	"Never, Never Gonna Give You Up" (US Edit) (Promo Video)	White	Devaney, Mokran
7.	"The Real Thing" (Live at Riverside Studios, 1997)	Stansfield, Devaney	Devaney, Mokran
8.	"I'm Leavin'" (Live at Riverside Studios, 1997)	Lindesay, Stinson	Devaney, Mokran
9.	"People Hold On" (Live at Riverside Studios, 1997)	Stansfield, Black, More	Bewick, Frost
10.	"Suzanne" (Live at Riverside Studios, 1997)	Stansfield, Devaney	Devaney, Mokran
11.	"Don't Cry for Me" (Live at Riverside Studios, 1997)	Stansfield, Devaney, Rooney, Morales	Devaney, Mokran, Rooney, Morales
12.	"Never, Never Gonna Give You Up" (Live at Riverside Studios, 1997)	White	Devaney, Mokran
13.	"Change" (Live at Riverside Studios, 1997)	Stansfield, Devaney, Morris	Devaney, Morris
14.	"You Know How to Love Me" (Live at Riverside Studios, 1997)	Lucas, Mtume	Devaney, Mokran
15.	"The Line" (Live at Riverside Studios, 1997)	Stansfield, Devaney, Gamwell	Devaney, Mokran
16.	"All Around the World" (Live at Riverside Studios, 1997)	Stansfield, Devaney, Morris	Devaney, Morris
17.	"2014 Interview with Mark Goodier"

Face Up (disc one – CD)
No.	Title	Writer(s)	Producer(s)	Length
1.	"I've Got Something Better"	Stansfield, Devaney, Richard Darbyshire	Devaney	4:25
2.	"Let's Just Call It Love"	Stansfield, Devaney, Darbyshire	Devaney	4:17
3.	"You Can Do That"	Stansfield, Devaney, Darbyshire, Musker	Devaney	4:30
4.	"How Could You?"	Stansfield, Devaney, Darbyshire	Devaney	4:34
5.	"Candy"	Stansfield, Devaney, Darbyshire	Devaney	5:06
6.	"I'm Coming to Get You"	Stansfield, Devaney, Darbyshire	Devaney	3:54
7.	"8-3-1"	Stansfield, Devaney, Darbyshire, Charlotte Kelly	Devaney	4:31
8.	"Wish on Me"	Stansfield, Devaney, Darbyshire	Devaney	4:49
9.	"Boyfriend"	Stansfield, Devaney	Devaney	4:44
10.	"Don't Leave Now I'm in Love"	Stansfield, Devaney, Darbyshire	Devaney	4:17
11.	"Didn't I"	Stansfield, Devaney, Darbyshire	Devaney	4:51
12.	"Face Up"	Stansfield, Devaney, Darbyshire	Devaney	4:52
13.	"When the Last Sun Goes Down"	Stansfield, Devaney, Darbyshire, Musker	Devaney	3:57
14.	"All over Me"	Stansfield, Devaney, Darbyshire	Devaney	5:09
15.	"Can't Wait To"	Stansfield, Devaney, Darbyshire, Kelly	Devaney	4:27
16.	"Let's Just Call It Love" (Original Vocal Mix)	Stansfield, Devaney, Darbyshire	Devaney	5:30
17.	"8-3-1" (Ian Devaney Remix)	Stansfield, Devaney, Darbyshire, Kelly	Devaney	6:02

Face Up (disc two – CD)
No.	Title	Writer(s)	Producer(s)	Length
1.	"Let's Just Call It Love" (Dreemhouse Full Extended Mix)	Stansfield, Devaney, Darbyshire	Devaney	4:36
2.	"More Than Sex"			5:01
3.	"8-3-1" (Morales Radio Mix)	Stansfield, Devaney, Darbyshire, Kelly	Devaney	3:23
4.	"I've Got Something Better" (Trackmasters Remix)	Stansfield, Devaney, Darbyshire	Devaney	3:54
5.	"All Around the World" (Norty Cotto Remix)	Stansfield, Devaney, Andy Morris	Devaney, Morris	7:33
6.	"Let's Just Call It Love" (Silk Cut Mix)	Stansfield, Devaney, Darbyshire	Devaney	5:37
7.	"8-3-1" (Morales Alternative Club Mix)	Stansfield, Devaney, Darbyshire, Kelly	Devaney	9:34
8.	"All Around the World" (Junior Vasquez Earth Anthem)	Stansfield, Devaney, Morris	Devaney, Morris	10:50
9.	"Let's Just Call It Love" (D.Y.N.K. Vocal)	Stansfield, Devaney, Darbyshire	Devaney	6:12
10.	"8-3-1" (Morales Dub)	Stansfield, Devaney, Darbyshire, Kelly	Devaney	8:12
11.	"All Around the World" (Norty's World Dub)	Stansfield, Devaney, Morris	Devaney, Morris	7:52
12.	"Let's Just Call It Love" (K-Warren Full Vocal)	Stansfield, Devaney, Darbyshire	Devaney	6:13

Face Up (disc three – DVD)
No.	Title	Writer(s)	Producer(s)	Length
1.	"Let's Just Call It Love" (Promo Video)	Stansfield, Devaney, Darbyshire	Devaney
2.	"8-3-1" (Live at Ronnie Scott's)	Stansfield, Devaney, Darbyshire, Kelly	Devaney
3.	"The Real Thing" (Live at Ronnie Scott's)	Stansfield, Devaney	Devaney, Mokran
4.	"So Natural" (Live at Ronnie Scott's)	Stansfield, Devaney	Devaney, Stansfield, Boughton
5.	"Make Love to Ya" (Live at Ronnie Scott's)	Stansfield, Devaney, Morris	Devaney, Morris
6.	"Tenderly" (Live at Ronnie Scott's)	Stansfield, Devaney, Morris	Devaney, Morris
7.	"Someday (I'm Coming Back)" (Live at Ronnie Scott's)	Stansfield, Devaney, Morris	Devaney, Morris
8.	"Don't Explain" (Live at Ronnie Scott's)	Billie Holiday, Arthur Herzog, Jr.
9.	"They Can't Take That Away from Me" (Live at Ronnie Scott's)	George Gershwin, Ira Gershwin
10.	"Didn't I" (Live at Ronnie Scott's)	Stansfield, Devaney, Darbyshire	Devaney
11.	"Change" (Live at Ronnie Scott's)	Stansfield, Devaney, Morris	Devaney, Morris
12.	"Live Together" (Live at Ronnie Scott's)	Stansfield, Devaney, Morris	Devaney, Morris
13.	"I've Got Something Better" (Live at Ronnie Scott's)	Stansfield, Devaney, Darbyshire	Devaney
14.	"Face Up" (Live at Ronnie Scott's)	Stansfield, Devaney, Darbyshire	Devaney
15.	"All Woman" (Live at Ronnie Scott's)	Stansfield, Devaney, Morris	Devaney, Morris
16.	"Never, Never Gonna Give You Up" (Live at Ronnie Scott's)	Barry White	Devaney, Mokran
17.	"People Hold On" (Live at Ronnie Scott's)	Stansfield, Black, More	Bewick, Frost
18.	"All Around the World" (Live at Ronnie Scott's) (+ q & a)	Stansfield, Devaney, Morris	Devaney, Morris
19.	"2014 Interview with Mark Goodier"

People Hold On ... The Remix Anthology (disc one – CD)
No.	Title	Writer(s)	Producer(s)	Length
1.	"People Hold On" (Full Length Disco Mix)	Lisa Stansfield, Matt Black, Jonathan More	Coldcut	9:24
2.	"What Did I Do to You?" (Morales Mix)	Stansfield, Ian Devaney, Andy Morris	Devaney, Morris	7:59
3.	"Change" (Ultimate Club Mix)	Stansfield, Devaney, Morris	Devaney, Morris	7:54
4.	"Never, Never Gonna Give You Up" (Frankie's Classic Club Mix)	Barry White	Devaney, Peter Mokran	8:15
5.	"This Is the Right Time" (The Rhythm Mix)	Stansfield, Devaney, Morris	Coldcut	7:51
6.	"The Real Thing" (K-Klassic Mix)	Stansfield, Devaney	Devaney, Mokran	8:39
7.	"Let's Just Call It Love" (Feel It Mix)	Stansfield, Devaney, Richard Darbyshire	Devaney	7:42
8.	"Make Love to Ya" (Light Me Up Mix)	Stansfield, Devaney, Morris	Devaney, Morris	5:02
9.	"Set Your Loving Free" (Dubmaster Edit)	Stansfield, Devaney, Morris	Devaney, Morris	4:42
10.	"Time to Make You Mine" (Sunship Mix)	Stansfield, Devaney, Morris	Devaney, Morris	6:00
11.	"All Around the World" (The Global Quest)	Stansfield, Devaney, Morris	Devaney, Morris	6:17

People Hold On ... The Remix Anthology (disc two – CD)
No.	Title	Writer(s)	Producer(s)	Length
1.	"Live Together" (Live It Up)	Stansfield, Devaney, Morris	Devaney, Morris	6:42
2.	"This Is the Right Time" (Shep Pettibone Extended Remix)	Stansfield, Devaney, Morris	Coldcut	9:44
3.	"I'm Leavin'" (Hex Hector N.Y.C. Rough Mix)	Crayge Lindesay, Telisa Stinson	Devaney, Mokran	10:09
4.	"Let's Just Call It Love" (Bass City Rollaz Rollin' Dub)	Stansfield, Devaney, Darbyshire	Devaney	5:52
5.	"Never Gonna Fall" (Wyclef Remix)	Stansfield, Devaney	Devaney, Mokran	3:52
6.	"Set Your Loving Free" (Low Life Mix)	Stansfield, Devaney, Morris	Devaney, Morris	5:47
7.	"Never, Never Gonna Give You Up" (After Hours Mix)	White	Devaney, Mokran	7:10
8.	"The Love in Me" (12" Remix)	Stansfield, Devaney, Morris	Devaney, Morris	7:10
9.	"You Can't Deny It" (Sky King Mix)	Stansfield, Devaney, Morris	Devaney, Morris	8:21
10.	"What Did I Do to You?" (Anti Poll Tax Dub)	Stansfield, Devaney, Morris	Devaney, Morris	6:31
11.	"Change" (Metamorphosis Mix)	Stansfield, Devaney, Morris	Devaney, Morris	7:54

People Hold On ... The Remix Anthology (disc three – CD)
No.	Title	Writer(s)	Producer(s)	Length
1.	"All Around the World" (American Club Remix)	Stansfield, Devaney, Morris	Devaney, Morris	11:34
2.	"The Line" (Pure Funk Mix)	Stansfield, Devaney, Terry Gamwell	Devaney, Mokran	4:20
3.	"Change" (Bone-Idol Mix)	Stansfield, Devaney, Morris	Devaney, Morris	5:57
4.	"Live Together" (Big Beat Mix)	Stansfield, Devaney, Morris	Devaney, Morris	5:00
5.	"The Real Thing" (Yūtenji Mix)	Stansfield, Devaney	Devaney, Mokran	4:55
6.	"You Can't Deny It" (Yvonne Turner Extended Remix)	Stansfield, Devaney, Morris	Devaney, Morris	7:39
7.	"The Line" (Ian O'Brien's Benfleet 3:30 Mix)	Stansfield, Devaney, Gamwell	Devaney, Mokran	10:06
8.	"Never, Never Gonna Give You Up" (Franktified Off the Hook Dub)	White	Devaney, Mokran	7:14
9.	"What Did I Do to You?" (Red Zone Mix)	Stansfield, Devaney, Morris	Devaney, Morris	7:45
10.	"Time to Make You Mine" (In My Dreams Mix)	Stansfield, Devaney, Morris	Devaney, Morris	9:24
11.	"All Around the World" (Attack Mix)	Stansfield, Devaney, Morris	Devaney, Morris	5:00

== Release history ==
Region	Date	Label	Format	Catalog
United Kingdom	10 November 2014	Edsel	13 CD + 5 DVD	LSBOX 001
Europe	21 November 2014	Edsel	13 CD + 5 DVD	LSBOX 001
