= Time to Make You Mine =

1992 single by Lisa Stansfield

Single by Lisa Stansfield

from the album Real Love
- Released: 2 March 1992
- Genre: R&B; soul; pop
- Length: 4:55
- Label: Arista
- Songwriters: Lisa Stansfield; Ian Devaney; Andy Morris
- Producers: Ian Devaney; Andy Morris

Lisa Stansfield singles chronology
"All Woman" (1991)	"Time to Make You Mine" (1992)	"Set Your Loving Free" (1992)

Music video
- "Time to Make You Mine" on YouTube

"Time to Make You Mine" is a song recorded by British singer, songwriter and actress Lisa Stansfield for her second album, Real Love (1991). It was written by her with Ian Devaney and Andy Morris, and produced by Devaney and Morris. The song was released by Arista Records as the third single from the album in Europe on 2 March 1992 and in Japan on 3 June 1992. It also included "All Around the World" recorded as a duet with Barry White. All artist royalties from this single were donated to the charity Trading Places. "Time to Make You Mine" was remixed by Masters at Work (Little Louie Vega and Kenny "Dope" Gonzalez), Martin Glover and The Orb. The John Lindauer-directed music video was also released. The song reached number fourteen in the United Kingdom.

== Chart performance ==
Not commercially as successful as the first two singles from Real Love, "Time to Make You Mine" still made an impact on the charts in Europe. The song entered the top 20 in the UK, peaking at number 14 on the UK Singles Chart on 5 April 1992, in its fifth week on the chart. Having debuted as number 31, it then climbed to number 21, 17 and 16, before peaking at number 14. And on the UK Dance Singles chart, it reached number 23. Additionally, the song was a top-40 hit in both Spain (31) and Switzerland (33), as well as on the Eurochart Hot 100, reaching number 37 in April same year. And it did also chart in Belgium, where it peaked at number 47 in on the Flemish Ultratop 50. Outside Europe, "Time to Make You Mine" charted in Australia, reaching number 114.

== Critical reception ==
An editor from Billboard magazine stated that Stansfield "has a field day with meatier songs", like "Time to Make You Mine". Steve Morse from The Boston Globe noted that "her extraordinary elastic voice pledges her love", describing it as "erotic". DeVaney and Clark from Cashbox named it a "sexy, make-love" song. Rufer & Fell from the Gavin Report described it as "an intimate performance of a song about an obsession for possession. A cool track." A reviewer from Liverpool Echo remarked that the singer "gets slow and soulful with a passionate vocal that sounds as if she's learned a few lessons in romancing from her hero Barry White." Scott Sterling from The Michigan Daily declared it a "dreamy" song, adding that it "showcases Stansfield's gorgeous voice at its best. Mixed right up front, it sounds like she's whispering her proclamations of love inches from your ear." Pan-European magazine Music & Media wrote that "it tastes like candy again, most of all the softly-spoken intermezzo. Dictionaries all around the world should replace the word "sensual" with "Stansfield"."

Alan Jones from Music Week named it Pick of the Week, and felt the singer "demonstrates her most intimate vocal yet with a breathy and pent up slice of superior soul guaranteed to maintain her hot streak." Parry Gettelman from Orlando Sentinel complimented the song as "wonderful". James Hamilton from the Record Mirror Dance Update named it "another quality Stansfield/Devaney/Morris creation" and a "breathily seductive groin grinding smoocher". Tom Doyle from Smash Hits gave it three out of five, noting that Stansfield "tangles her tonsils around a breathy, seductive Prince-type tune, in which she promises to 'caress your hips'." Sun-Sentinel declared it as "a song many women have lived". Mike Joyce from The Washington Post felt that "Stansfield can at least be counted on to invest them with plenty of power and melismatic panache, making 'Time to Make You Mine' and a few other R&B updates sure-fire radio fare."

== Remixes ==
On 21 June 1992, Arista Records released in Japan a special CD maxi single "Real Woman Hip Selection" which included remixes and B-sides form the Real Love era. Arista used the same single cover art as for the "Time to Make You Mine" single. In 2003, "Time to Make You Mine" was included on Biography: The Greatest Hits. In 2014, the remixes of "Time to Make You Mine" were included on the deluxe 2CD + DVD re-release of Real Love and on People Hold On ... The Remix Anthology (also on The Collection 1989–2003), including the previously unreleased Bomb Squad Remix by The Bomb Squad and Sunship Mix by Ceri Evans formerly of the Brand New Heavies. Both remixes were created for the US release of "Time to Make You Mine". However, this single release plan was abandoned, as Stansfield recorded her new song for The Bodyguard, "Someday (I'm Coming Back)".

== Track listings ==
- European 7" single / Japanese CD single
1. "Time to Make You Mine" (Edit) – 4:11
2. "All Around the World" (Duet with Barry White) – 4:34
- European CD single
1. "Time to Make You Mine" (Edit) – 4:11
2. "Time to Make You Mine" (Sugar Lips Mix) – 5:40
3. "Time to Make You Mine" (Push & Slide Mix) – 5:17
4. "All Around the World" (Duet with Barry White) – 4:34
- European 12" single
1. "Time to Make You Mine" (Sugar Lips Mix) – 5:40
2. "Time to Make You Mine" (House Dub) – 4:45
3. "Time to Make You Mine" (Edit) – 4:11
4. "All Around the World" (Duet with Barry White) – 4:34
- UK 12" single
1. "Time to Make You Mine" (Sugar Lips Mix) – 6:43
2. "Time to Make You Mine" (Push & Slide Mix) – 6:31
3. "Time to Make You Mine" (House Dub) – 4:45
4. "Time to Make You Mine" (In My Dreams Mix) – 9:13
5. "Time to Make You Mine" (Kenlou Supa Mix) – 6:30
6. "Time to Make You Mine" (Jeep Version) – 5:37
- Japanese "Real Woman Hip Selection" CD single
1. "Change" (Knuckles Mix) – 6:29
2. "Everything Will Get Better" (Extended Mix) – 8:03
3. "All Around the World" (Duet with Barry White) – 4:34
4. "All Woman" (Edit) – 4:49
5. "Time to Make You Mine" (Push & Slide Mix) – 6:31
6. "Change" (Driza Bone Mix) – 6:11
- Other remixes
1. "Time to Make You Mine" (Bomb Squad Remix) – 5:12
2. "Time to Make You Mine" (Sunship Mix) – 6:00

== Charts ==
=== Weekly charts ===
Chart (1992)	Peak position
Australia (ARIA)	114
Belgium (Ultratop 50 Flanders)	47
Europe (European Hot 100 Singles)	37
Netherlands (Dutch Top 40 Tipparade)	2
Netherlands (Single Top 100)	47
Spain Radio (PROMUSICAE)	31
Switzerland (Schweizer Hitparade)	33
UK Singles (OCC)	14
UK Airplay (Music Week)	14
UK Dance (Music Week)	23
UK Club Chart (Music Week)	18

=== Year-end charts ===
Chart (1992)	Position
UK Airplay (Music Week)	68
