= Change (Lisa Stansfield song) =

1991 single by Lisa Stansfield

Single by Lisa Stansfield

from the album Real Love
- Released: 7 October 1991
- Genre: R&B; pop; dance
- Length: 5:39
- Label: Arista
- Songwriters: Lisa Stansfield; Ian Devaney; Andy Morris
- Producers: Ian Devaney; Andy Morris

Lisa Stansfield singles chronology
"You Can't Deny It" (1990)	"Change" (1991)	"All Woman" (1991)

Music video
- "Change" (EU) on YouTube

"Change" is a song by British singer-songwriter and actress Lisa Stansfield from her second album, Real Love (1991). The song was written by Stansfield, Ian Devaney and Andy Morris, and produced by Devaney and Morris. It was released as the lead single on 7 October 1991 by Arista Records. "Change" was remixed by Frankie Knuckles and Driza Bone.

"Change" became a hit, reaching top 10 in several European countries and Canada. In the United States, it peaked at numbers 20 and 27 on the Cash Box Top 100 and Billboard Hot 100 charts, and number one on the Billboard Dance Club Play chart. It also reached number 12 on the Billboard Hot R&B Singles chart and number 13 on the Billboard Adult Contemporary chart. Two music videos for the song were released: the European version directed by Steve Lowe, which was filmed in Portugal, and the American version directed by Stefan Würnitzer.

In 2003, "Change" was included on Biography: The Greatest Hits. In 2014, the remixes of "Change" were included on the deluxe 2CD + DVD re-release of Real Love and on People Hold On ... The Remix Anthology (also on The Collection 1989–2003).

== Critical reception ==
The song received favorable reviews from many music critics. David Taylor-Wilson from Bay Area Reporter wrote that Stansfield is "sounding like Donna Summer". Larry Flick from Billboard magazine complimented it as "a gorgeous down-tempo disco trip", adding that with "a subtle slice of Philly-styled soul, Stansfield's lovely alto is caressed by soft strings and a warm bassline. Factor in a memorable chorus and you have the makings of a multiformat smash." Scott Sterling from The Michigan Daily complimented the song as a "smooth, driving groove with luscious strings and mellow horns that sounds like a '90s Love Unlimited Orchestra." Daniel S. Housman from Miscellany News felt it "seems addressed to a friend in need."

A reviewer from Boston Herald noted that the "husky-voiced" singer "purrs" through the song. The Columbus Dispatch remarked that before Stansfield even gets around to singing on "Change", "she breathes - deeply - into her microphone to establish mood. Nearly every line in the song, in fact, is preceded by a sensuous expulsion of breath." Dave Sholin from the Gavin Report commented that "blending elements of jazz, pop and dance is an art Lisa and partners Ian Devaney and Andy Morris perfected on their debut album, and now they take us to level two. If this lead-off single is any indication, her soon-to-be-released album Real Love should cause an awful lot of excitement when it hits the street."

Pan-European magazine Music & Media found that on her first single in two years, Stansfield is updating the '70s "Philly" soul sound, "tastefully adding a fashionable dance beat to it." James Hamilton from Music Week's RM Dance Update named it "her best in ages". The Newcastle Evening Chronicle noted that it "marks the start of a new and exciting era in her career." Parry Gettelman from Orlando Sentinel felt it's the "best track" of the album, saying that "Its catchy melody floats along on a sea of strings and burbling synth and horn riffs." The Sun-Sentinel's reviewer found that "Change" "deals with unconditional love. The woman is telling the man that she loves him and always will despite all he's put her through. (Sound familiar, ladies?) This song has a funky beat that really gets you moving." Caroline Sullivan from Smash Hits described Stansfield's voice as "glass-shattering".

"Change" was awarded one of BMI's Pop Awards in 1993, honoring the songwriters, composers and music publishers of the song.

== Chart performance ==
"Change" was a top-10 hit in Belgium, Italy, Luxembourg, the Netherlands, Spain and the UK. In the latter country, it peaked at number 10 on the UK Singles Chart, on 20 October 1991. The single also was a top-20 hit in Germany, Ireland, Sweden and Switzerland. On the Eurochart Hot 100, "Change" peaked at number 11 in November 1993, while on the European Dance Radio Chart, it reached number one same month.

Outside Europe, the single entered the top 10 in Canada, where it peaked at number 10, and in the United States, where it peaked at number one for two weeks on the Billboard Dance Club Play chart, numbers 20 and 27 on the US Cash Box Top 100 and Billboard Hot 100 charts, number 12 on the Billboard Hot R&B Singles chart and number 13 on the Billboard Adult Contemporary chart. In Israel, it became a top-20 hit, peaking at number 19 on 5 November 1991. In Australia and New Zealand, the song peaked at numbers 21 and 20, respectively.

== Music video ==
The European music video for "Change", directed by Steve Lowe was filmed on location in Lisbon, Portugal and features two of the city's notable landmarks, The Monument of the Discoveries at the very beginning and the 25 de Abril Bridge over the river Tagus shown later in background. It begins with a close-up of Stansfield's face against a white background as she sings the chorus. Other scenes show her standing on a balcony on top of a building at night with thunderstorms over the rooftops. She also sometimes sits on a beach. All these scenes are mixed with close-ups of the singer's face against the light background. The video was later made available on Stansfield's official YouTube channel in 2012, and had generated more than 12 million views as of August 2026.

== Track listings ==
- European and US 7-inch single; Japanese CD single
1. "Change" (Single Mix) – 4:18
2. "A Little More Love" – 4:28
- European CD single
1. "Change" (Single Mix) – 4:18
2. "Change" (Driza Bone Mix) – 6:11
3. "A Little More Love" – 4:28
- UK CD single
1. "Change" (Single Mix) – 4:18
2. "Change" (Driza Bone Mix) – 6:11
3. "Change" (Knuckles Mix) – 6:29
- US CD single
1. "Change" (Single Mix) – 4:18
2. "Change" (Classic Radio Mix Edit) – 3:55
3. "Change" (Ultimate Club Mix) – 7:54
4. "It's Got to Be Real" – 5:17
- European 12-inch single
1. "Change" (Driza Bone Mix) – 6:11
2. "A Little More Love" – 4:28
3. "Change" (Knuckles Mix) – 6:29
- UK 12-inch single
1. "Change" (Driza Bone Mix) – 6:11
2. "Change" (Bone-Idol Mix) – 5:57
3. "Change" (Knuckles Mix) – 6:29
- US 12-inch single
1. "Change" (Ultimate Club Mix) – 7:54
2. "Change" (Misty Dub Mix) – 7:31
3. "Change" (Driza Bone Dub Mix) – 6:08
4. "Change" (Single Mix) – 4:18
- 2006 US digital Dance Vault Mixes
1. "Change" (Ultimate Club Mix) – 7:54
2. "Change" (Misty Dub Mix) – 7:31
3. "Change" (Driza Bone Mix) – 6:11
4. "Change" (Single Mix) – 4:18
5. "Change" (Knuckles Mix) – 6:29
6. "Change" (Bone-Idol Mix) – 5:57

== Charts ==
=== Weekly charts ===
Chart (1991–1992)	Peak position
Australia (ARIA)	21
Austria (Ö3 Austria Top 40)	24
Belgium (Ultratop 50 Flanders)	6
Canada Top Singles (RPM)	10
Canada Adult Contemporary (RPM)	4
Canada Dance/Urban (RPM)	2
Europe (Eurochart Hot 100)	11
Europe (European Dance Radio)	1
Europe (European Hit Radio)	1
France (SNEP)	30
Germany (GfK)	13
Ireland (IRMA)	17
Israel (Israeli Singles Chart)	19
Italy (Musica e dischi)	2
Luxembourg (Radio Luxembourg)	3
Netherlands (Dutch Top 40)	7
Netherlands (Single Top 100)	7
New Zealand (Recorded Music NZ)	20
Spain (AFYVE)	6
Sweden (Sverigetopplistan)	13
Switzerland (Schweizer Hitparade)	12
UK Singles (Official Charts)	10
UK Airplay (Music Week)	2
UK Dance (Music Week)	2
UK Club Chart (Record Mirror)	3
US Billboard Hot 100	27
US Adult Contemporary (Billboard)	13
US Dance Club Songs (Billboard)	1
US Hot R&B/Hip-Hop Songs (Billboard)	12
US Cash Box Top 100	20

=== Year-end charts ===
Chart (1991)	Position
Europe (European Hit Radio)	53
Netherlands (Dutch Top 40)	53
Netherlands (Single Top 100)	85
Sweden (Topplistan)	65
UK Club Chart (Record Mirror)	70

Chart (1992)	Position
Brazil (Crowley)	90
Canada Adult Contemporary (RPM)	40
Germany (Media Control)	71
US Dance Club Play (Billboard)	35
US Maxi-Singles Sales (Billboard)	14

== Release history ==
Region	Date	Format(s)	Label(s)	Ref.
Australia	7 October 1991	12-inch vinyl; CD; cassette	Arista	
United Kingdom	7 October 1991	7-inch vinyl; 12-inch vinyl; CD; cassette	Arista	
Japan	6 November 1991	Mini-CD	Arista	

== See also ==
- List of number-one dance singles of 1991 (U.S.)
