= You Can't Deny It =

Single by Lisa Stansfield

from the album Affection
- Released: 2 May 1990
- Recorded: 1989
- Genre: R&B; new jack swing; soul
- Length: 5:32
- Label: Arista
- Songwriters: Lisa Stansfield; Ian Devaney; Andy Morris
- Producers: Ian Devaney; Andy Morris

Lisa Stansfield singles chronology
"What Did I Do to You?" (1990)	"You Can't Deny It" (1990)	"Change" (1991)

Music video
- "You Can't Deny It" on YouTube

"You Can't Deny It" is a song by English singer-songwriter and actress Lisa Stansfield from her debut solo studio album, Affection (1989). It was written by Stansfield, Ian Devaney, and Andy Morris, produced by Devaney and Morris, and remixed by Gail "Sky" King and Yvonne Turner. The song was released as the album's second North American single on 2 May 1990, by Arista Records and received generally positive reviews from music critics.

"You Can't Deny It" achieved great commercial success, reaching number 14 on both the US Billboard Hot 100 and Canadian RPM Top Singles chart. The accompanying music video was directed by Steve Lowe and Jimmy Fletcher. In 2003, the song was included on the North American edition of Stansfield's first greatest hits compilation album, Biography: The Greatest Hits. In 2014, the remixes of "You Can't Deny It" were included on the deluxe 2CD + DVD re-release of Affection and on her third remix album, People Hold On ... The Remix Anthology (also on The Collection 1989–2003). The new 24/7 version of the song was included on the deluxe edition of Stansfield's seventh studio album, Seven, and on Seven+ also in 2014.

== Release ==
"You Can't Deny It" was released as the album's second North American single on 2 May 1990, by Arista Records. In Japan, the song was released on 21 June 1990. The "You Can't Deny It" single also included the previously unreleased tracks, "Lay Me Down" and "Something's Happenin'."

In September 1990, just before Stansfield's European tour, the double A-side single "This Is the Right Time"/"You Can't Deny It" with US remixes was released in selected European countries.

== Chart performance ==
"You Can't Deny It" became a hit in the United States, reaching number fourteen and seventeen on the Billboard Hot 100 and Cash Box Top 100 charts, number one on the Billboard Hot Black Singles chart, number two on the Billboard Dance Club Songs chart and number 26 on the Billboard Adult Contemporary chart.

In Canada, the song peaked at number fourteen on the RPM Top Singles chart and the RPM Adult Contemporary chart, and number two on the RPM Dance/Urban chart.

== Critical reception ==
In a 2019 retrospective review, Matthew Hocter from Albumism viewed the song as "R&B inspired". Upon the release, Bill Coleman from Billboard magazine stated that here, Stansfield "comes closer to establishing herself as a major star". He noted that "placed on top of a familiar swingbeat, glorious vocals weave effortlessly through lines of retro-fashioned strings and horns." Greg Kot from Chicago Tribune described it as "gliding". Dave Sholin from the Gavin Report felt there are lots of choice selections on Lisa's debut album, "and here is a sweet example of her brand of whirling, sophisticated soul. No denying she must be considered among the most promising new artists to emerge this year." Greg Sandow from Entertainment Weekly found that Stansfield "might be hurtling right to the top of the charts. Can we listen to her soberly? "We drive each other crazy", she sings, in a voice like a suffocated flame. "No two people ever felt this way", she wants her lucky lover to know."

A. Scott Galloway from The Network Forty complimented the song as a "sexy follow-up". Another editor, Gene Sandbloom declared it as "soulful and danceable in all the right places". Amy Linden for Rolling Stone remarked that here, Stansfield "evokes" Deniece Williams but does it her way, "with a hint of Brit reserve and a cool, never cold, aloofness". Steven Daly from Spin said that "All Around the World" was "a sensational piece of selfinvention around the kind of voice that vaporizes all criticism", concluding that "You Can't Deny It" "is again bitin' on Jazzie's groove with a similarly searing vocal. Ahistorical, arculturual, probably amoral—a great single."

== Music video ==
The music video for "You Can't Deny It" was directed by Steve Lowe and Jimmy Fletcher. It was later made available on Stansfield's official YouTube channel in February 2013, and had generated more than 1 million views as of January 2023.

== Track listing and formats ==
- US 7" single / Japanese CD single
1. "You Can't Deny It" (Single Version) – 4:32
2. "Lay Me Down" – 4:21
- US CD single
1. "You Can't Deny It" (Single Version) – 4:32
2. "Lay Me Down" – 4:21
3. "Something's Happenin'" – 3:57
- US 12" single
1. "You Can't Deny It" (Extended Version) – 7:53
2. "You Can't Deny It" (Single Version) – 4:21
3. "You Can't Deny It" (Sky King Mix) – 8:21
4. "Lay Me Down" – 4:16
- US promotional 12" single
1. "You Can't Deny It" (Extended Short Version) – 5:04
2. "You Can't Deny It" (Extended Long Version) – 7:53
3. "You Can't Deny It" (Sky King Mix) – 8:21
4. "You Can't Deny It" (Percapella) – 4:14
- US promotional 12" single
1. "You Can't Deny It" (Extended Remix) – 7:39
2. "You Can't Deny It" (Dubmental) – 6:47
3. "You Can't Deny It" (R&B Radio Remix) – 5:01
4. "You Can't Deny It" (Silky Sax Mix) – 7:39
- European 7" single
1. "You Can't Deny It" (US Mix) – 4:22
2. "This Is the Right Time" (US Mix) – 4:12
- European CD single
1. "This Is the Right Time" (US Mix) – 4:12
2. "You Can't Deny It" (Yvonne Turner Mix) – 6:08
3. "This Is the Right Time" (Shep Pettibone Mix) – 6:33
- European 12" single
1. "This Is the Right Time" (Shep Pettibone Mix) – 6:33
2. "This Is the Right Time" (Yvonne Turner Mix) – 7:51
3. "You Can't Deny It" (Yvonne Turner Mix) – 6:08
- Other remixes
1. "You Can't Deny It" (24/7) – 4:22

== Charts ==
=== Weekly charts ===
Chart (1990)	Peak position
Canada Top Singles (RPM)	14
Canada Adult Contemporary (RPM)	14
Canada Dance/Urban (RPM)	2
US Billboard Hot 100	14
US Adult Contemporary (Billboard)	26
US Dance Club Songs (Billboard)	2
US Hot Black Singles (Billboard)	1
US Cash Box Top 100	17

=== Year-end charts ===
Chart (1990)	Position
Canada Dance/Urban (RPM)	16
US Dance Club Songs (Billboard)	36
US Hot Black (R&B) Singles (Billboard)	58

== See also ==
- List of number-one R&B singles of 1990 (U.S.)
