= All Woman =

Single by Lisa Stansfield

from the album Real Love
- Released: 9 December 1991
- Recorded: 1991
- Genre: Soul
- Length: 5:17
- Label: Arista
- Songwriters: Lisa Stansfield; Ian Devaney; Andy Morris
- Producers: Ian Devaney; Andy Morris

Lisa Stansfield singles chronology
"Change" (1991)	"All Woman" (1991)	"Time to Make You Mine" (1992)

Music video
- "All Woman" on YouTube

"All Woman" is a song recorded by British singer, songwriter and actress Lisa Stansfield for her second album, Real Love (1991). The song was written by Stansfield, Ian Devaney and Andy Morris, and produced by Devaney and Morris. It was released by Arista Records as the second single on 9 December 1991 in the United Kingdom and in early 1992 in the rest of the world. The song reached number twenty in the United Kingdom. In the United States, it peaked at numbers 47 and 56 on the Cash Box Top 100 and Billboard Hot 100 charts, and number one on the Billboard Hot R&B/Hip-Hop Songs chart. It also reached number twenty-one on the Adult Contemporary Singles chart. The accompanying music video was directed by Nick Brandt. The single's B-side included previously unreleased track, "Everything Will Get Better." The latter was remixed by Danny Tenaglia and reached number thirty-six on the Hot Dance Club Songs.

In 2003, "All Woman" was included on Biography: The Greatest Hits. In 2014, the remixes of "Everything Will Get Better" were included on the deluxe 2CD + DVD re-release of Real Love (also on The Collection 1989–2003).

== Composition and lyrics ==
Written by Stansfield with Ian Devaney and Andy Morris, the song's lyrics is told from the perspective of a hardworking and long-suffering housewife who is hurt by her husband's insensitive remarks. Telling about a typical day in her life, the lyrics starts off describing the end of that day. Her man comes home from work, worn and weary, only to snap at the toll the day's labors have taken on her appearance.

J.D. Considine from The Baltimore Sun said about the lyrics, "It's an archetypal romantic confrontation, starting off with tempers flaring and ending with a tender reconciliation. And unlike a lot of love songs, it seemed to spring from real life, not fantasy-land." Larry Flick from Billboard magazine felt the lyrics are "poignant". Clark and DeVaney from Cashbox viewed them as "a cry for renewed love in relationships that have lost their spark and gently reminds us of the complacency trap couples fall into when they start to take each other for granted." Dave Sholin from the Gavin Report described the lyrics as a "slice of real life [to] stir human emotions". David Quantick from NME felt the song "has a nice sort of determined lyric", while Parry Gettelman from Orlando Sentinel felt it has the "best lyrics" on the album, "about a woman whose marriage has gone stale: Yes, I look a mess, but I don't love you any less." Mike Joyce from The Washington Post remarked that they "explore the darker side of a working-class relationship, a portrait that is, by turns, despairing, defiant and optimistic."

== Chart performance ==
"All Woman" was a sizeable hit on the charts all over the world. In Europe, the song entered the top 20 in Italy (11), Luxembourg (12) and the UK, where it peaked at number 20 in its fourth week on the UK Singles Chart on 5 January 1992. It debuted as number 35, and climbed to number 23 and 22, before peaking at number 20. It did also chart on the Music Week Dance Singles chart, peaking at number 17. Additionally, the single entered the top 30 in Belgium (28) and the Netherlands (21), and the top 40 in Spain (38) and Sweden (38). On the Eurochart Hot 100, it reached number 39, but was far more successful on the European Dance Radio Chart, peaking at number six.

Outside Europe, "All Woman" reached number one on the US Billboard Hot R&B/Hip-Hop Songs chart, numbers 47 and 56 on the US Cash Box Top 100 and Billboard Hot 100 charts, and number 21 on the Billboard Adult Contemporary chart. In Canada, the song peaked at number nine on the RPM Adult Contemporary chart and number 50 on the RPM Top Singles chart. In Zimbabwe, it was very successful, peaking at number five. In Australia, it was a top 60 hit, peaking at number 52.

== Critical reception ==
AllMusic editor Alex Henderson complimented the song as a "poigant and heartbreaking ballad". J.D. Considine from The Baltimore Sun felt it "had the feel of an instant classic. 'All Woman' seems to be an instant masterpiece, the sort of soul song that will sound just as fresh in 20 years as it does today." David Taylor-Wilson from Bay Area Reporter stated that it's the ballad "that's going to sell this set." Larry Flick from Billboard magazine described it as a "deeply affecting ballad", and "easily Stansfield's strongest performance to date; she is caressed by muted strings and a soft, R&B-grounded bass line." He also noted that the song "reveal a distinctive and confident style." Another Billboard editor praised it as "glorious". A reviewer from Boston Herald wrote that the "husky-voiced singer purrs through a string of lushly orchestrated dance/pop love ballads", as "All Woman". Clark and DeVaney from Cashbox commented, "This beautifully sung, tender and soulful ballad".

Dave Sholin from the Gavin Report noted that Stansfield "puts all her heart" into the song. Another Gavin Report editor stated, "Lest there by any doubt...Ms. Stanfield can carry a tune and this song of feminine affirmation is a home run." Daniel S. Housman from Miscellany News declared it as "a smoldering ballad". Pan-European magazine Music & Media wrote that it is a "smooth ballad, not heard anymore since the top days of Shirley Bassey", adding that Stansfield "should be an excellent choice to sing lead on a future 007 soundtrack." Stephen Holden from Rolling Stone called it a "gem" from the Real Love album, "that sounds tailor-made for Gladys Knight, although Knight would have a hard time topping Stansfield's version." Caroline Sullivan from Smash Hits felt that "she raises the hairs on your neck". Mike Joyce from The Washington Post named "All Woman" "the album's most moving performance", having Stansfield venturing "far beyond the usual radio fodder".

== Track listings ==
- European/US 7" single / Japanese CD single
1. "All Woman" (Edit) – 4:49
2. "Everything Will Get Better" – 5:00
- European CD single
1. "All Woman" (Edit) – 4:49
2. "Everything Will Get Better" (Extended Mix) – 8:03
3. "Change" (Metamorphosis Mix) – 7:04
- US 12" single
1. "All Woman" – 5:16
2. "Everything Will Get Better" (Sax on the Beach Mix) – 6:35
3. "Everything Will Get Better" (Ian & Andy 12") – 8:01
4. "Everything Will Get Better" (Underground Club Mix) – 9:54

== Charts ==
=== Weekly charts ===
Weekly chart performance for "All Woman"
Chart (1991–1992)	Peak position
Australia (ARIA)	52
Belgium (Ultratop 50 Flanders)	28
Canada Top Singles (RPM)	50
Canada Adult Contemporary (RPM)	9
Europe (European Hot 100 Singles)	39
Europe (European Dance Radio)	6
Italy (Musica e dischi)	11
Luxembourg (Radio Luxembourg)	12
Netherlands (Dutch Top 40)	21
Netherlands (Single Top 100)	21
Spain Radio (PROMUSICAE)	38
Sweden (Sverigetopplistan)	38
UK Singles (Official Charts)	20
UK Airplay (Music Week)	16
UK Dance (Music Week)	17
UK Club Chart (Record Mirror)	10
US Billboard Hot 100	56
US Adult Contemporary (Billboard)	21
US Hot R&B/Hip-Hop Songs (Billboard)	1
US Cash Box Top 100	47
Zimbabwe (ZIMA)	5

=== Year-end charts ===
Year-end chart performance for "All Woman"
Chart (1992)	Position
Canada Adult Contemporary (RPM)	74
US Hot R&B/Hip-Hop Songs (Billboard)	11

== See also ==
- List of number-one R&B singles of 1992 (U.S.)
