= Affection (Lisa Stansfield album) =

- International variant of the standard artwork

Studio album by Lisa Stansfield
- Released: 20 November 1989
- Recorded: 1989
- Genres: R&B; soul; pop; dance-pop; new jack swing
- Length: 51:29
- Label: Arista
- Producers: Ian Devaney; Andy Morris; Coldcut

Lisa Stansfield chronology
Big Thing (1988)	Affection (1989)	Real Love (1991)

Singles from Affection
- 1. "This Is the Right Time" Released: 31 July 1989; 2. "All Around the World" Released: 16 October 1989; 3. "Live Together" Released: 29 January 1990; 4. "What Did I Do to You?" Released: 30 April 1990; 5. "You Can't Deny It" Released: 2 May 1990

Affection is the debut solo album by British singer-songwriter and actress Lisa Stansfield, released by Arista Records on 20 November 1989. Stansfield co-wrote all songs with Ian Devaney and Andy Morris. Devaney and Morris also produced the album, except for "This Is the Right Time" which was produced by Coldcut. Affection received critical acclaim from music critics and was commercially successful. It reached top ten on the charts in many countries and has sold over five million copies worldwide. The album spawned a hit song, "All Around the World", and four other successful singles: "This Is the Right Time", "Live Together", "What Did I Do to You?" and "You Can't Deny It". Affection was rereleased as a deluxe 2CD + DVD set in the United Kingdom on 10 November 2014 and in Europe on 21 November 2014.

== Background ==
In March 1989, Stansfield was featured on Coldcut's song "People Hold On" which she co-wrote. The single became a top forty hit in Europe, reaching number eleven in the United Kingdom. In the United States, it peaked at number six on the Billboard's Hot Dance Club Songs. On the strength of this hit, Arista Records signed Stansfield as a solo artist, with Ian Devaney and Andy Morris from their band Blue Zone as her composers, musicians and producers. Coldcut returned the favour by producing Stansfield's next record "This Is the Right Time".

== Content ==
The whole album was written by Stansfield, Ian Devaney and Andy Morris. All songs were produced by Devaney and Morris, except "This Is the Right Time" produced by Coldcut. At first, Affection was released in Europe on 20 November 1989. It included thirteen songs on the CD and cassette editions of the album and ten songs on the LP version (without "Affection", "Wake Up Baby" and "The Way You Want It"). On 20 February 1990, the album was issued in North America with noticeably refined mixes of several of the songs and different sequences of the tracks. In 2003, Affection was remastered and re-released as limited edition digipak with four bonus songs: "People Hold On", "My Apple Heart", "Lay Me Down" and "Something's Happenin'". The last three tracks were originally included on the European single, "What Did I Do to You?". In North America, "Lay Me Down" and "Something's Happenin'" were featured on the "You Can't Deny It" single and "My Apple Heart" became "This Is the Right Time" B-side.

Affection was remastered and expanded, and was re-released as a deluxe 2CD + DVD set in November 2014. It was expanded to feature rare tracks and 12" mixes plus videos, live footage and a specially recorded interview with Stansfield. The twenty-eight-page booklet features photos, memorabilia, lyrics and brand new sleeve notes. The set was issued in the United Kingdom on 10 November 2014 and in Europe on 21 November 2014. It was also released as a part of The Collection 1989–2003 at the same time. The 2014 reissue of Affection includes the previously unreleased track, "The Love in Me" (Extended Version). Issued at the same time, People Hold On ... The Remix Anthology features the following previously unreleased remixes of songs from Affection: "All Around the World" (Attack Mix), "What Did I Do to You?" (Red Zone Mix) and "The Love in Me" (12" Remix).

== Singles ==
"This Is the Right Time" was released as the first single in Europe on 31 July 1989 and peaked at number thirteen in the United Kingdom, number seventeen in Germany and number twenty in Austria. One year later on 30 July 1990, it was issued as the third North American single, reaching number twelve in Canada and number twenty-one on the US Billboard Hot 100. "This Is the Right Time" also peaked at number one on the US Hot Dance Club Songs and number thirteen on the Hot R&B/Hip-Hop Songs. The second European single, "All Around the World" was released on 16 October 1989. It became a hit reaching number one in the United Kingdom, Austria, Belgium, Netherlands, Norway and Spain, and peaking inside top ten elsewhere. "All Around the World" was also issued as the first single in North America on 15 January 1990. It was commercially successful reaching number three in Canada and on the Billboard Hot 100. "All Around the World" also topped the Hot R&B/Hip-Hop Songs and Hot Dance Club Songs, and was certified Platinum by the RIAA for selling over one million copies in the United States. The third European single, "Live Together" was issued on 29 January 1990 and reached top ten in the United Kingdom, Italy, Netherlands and Belgium.

"What Did I Do to You?" was released as the next single in Europe on 30 April 1990 and peaked at number seven in Italy, number twenty in Ireland and number twenty-five in the United Kingdom. The second North American single, "You Can't Deny It" was also successful. It was issued on 2 May 1990 and reached number fourteen in Canada and on the US Billboard Hot 100. The single also topped the Hot R&B/Hip-Hop Songs and peaked at number two on the Hot Dance Club Songs in the US. A double A-side single "This Is the Right Time"/"You Can't Deny It" with the US remixes was issued in selected European countries in September 1990 as the final release from Affection. In 2003, "This Is the Right Time", "All Around the World", "Live Together" and "You Can't Deny It" were included on Biography: The Greatest Hits. "The Love in Me" was twice considered as a potential single, first in late 1989 as a prospective follow-up to "All Around the World" and then again in 1990, when it was discarded in favour of the still more danceable "What Did I Do to You?". New remixes were produced on both occasions, only to be shelved. They were released in 2014 on the reissue of Affection and People Hold On ... The Remix Anthology (also on The Collection 1989–2003).

== Critical reception ==
Professional ratings
Review scores
Source	Rating
AllMusic	4.5/5 stars
Chicago Tribune	3.5/4 stars
Entertainment Weekly	A−
Los Angeles Times	3.5/5 stars
NME	8/10
Number One	5/5 stars
Record Mirror	4 1/2/5
Rolling Stone	4/5 stars
Smash Hits	8/10
The Village Voice	A−

Affection received acclaim from music critics. Writing retrospectively for AllMusic, Alex Henderson said, "Stansfield took the R&B world by storm with her melancholy, Barry White-influenced single 'All Around the World.' [...] Though she didn't shy away from hip-hop and house-music elements, Affection leaves no doubt where the British singer's heart lies – sleek yet gritty '70s R&B. Though the retro leanings of such updated soul treasures as 'You Can't Deny It' and 'What Did I Do to You?' are obvious, Stansfield's producers keep things very fresh sounding by embracing a decidedly high-tech and very late-'80s/early-'90s production style. Though essentially a soul diva, Stansfield has a disco masterpiece in the love-and-togetherness anthem 'This Is the Right Time.'"

Amy Linden for Rolling Stone called Stansfield the "sleek soul mama for the Nineties. [...] Affection is a picture-perfect marriage between house beats and the torchy growl of late-night silky soul. Not since Teena Marie has a white girl pulled off the pure joy and emotionality that Stansfield does, and without the downside of trying to sound authentically 'black.' Stansfield evokes Chaka Khan on 'Mighty Love' and Deniece Williams on 'You Can't Deny It' but doesn't ape them. She does it her way, with a hint of Brit reserve and a cool, never cold, aloofness. There's no chest thumping or sweating – Stansfield accomplishes what she has to with disarming ease. The way she reaches for the high notes ('What Did I Do to You?') and the way her voice slinks around the line 'so-oo sad' in 'All Around the World' show that this is someone who knows her roots – even if they aren't really hers. Affection's thirteen songs intermingle sweet Philly soul swing, the elegant string sections of the Seventies and Barry White's better moments of lushness; driving percussive keyboard patterns bring the mix firmly up to date. More simply, the album is an ideal blend of clubland energy and the passion of soul music, a dance record you can listen to."

Greg Sandow of Entertainment Weekly wrote, "Stansfield sounds both sultry and sincere: 'Sincerity,' in fact, is the subject (and title) of her most striking song, which she delivers with quiet but smoldering innocence. This is her first album, but she already sounds as if she knows who she is." He added that the album's producers have "invented rhythms so specific that each song seems to be shaped by its own genetic code. Some songs are chunky, some are silken; one underscores its title, 'Poison,' with what almost could be the sound of mammoth dark velvet bells. And that makes Affection stand out from other dance albums. The onrushing beat is varied and subtle enough to sweep you away not just once or twice, but in song after song." The Village Voice's Robert Christgau stated, "like few of her predecessors (Martha Reeves, Teddy Pendergrass), Stansfield's style is virtually devoid of trademark, display, or drama. The songs themselves are as attractive and unassuming as her voice, a fine instrument that provides more than the expected quota of aural pleasure without drowning you in its bounty." In Spin, Marisa Fox praised Stansfield as a vocalist capable of expressing "a complex range of emotions" and ultimately conveying "something real and substantive" through her singing and her "dramatic stance".

== Commercial reception ==
Affection has sold over five million copies around the world. It was certified three-times Platinum in the United Kingdom and Platinum and Gold in various countries, including Platinum in the United States for selling over one million copies. The album reached top ten around the globe, including number one in Austria and Italy. In the United Kingdom, it peaked at number two and in the United States, it reached number nine. Affection is Stansfield's most successful album.

== Awards ==
During the 1990 Brit Awards, Stansfield was nominated for four Brit Awards: British Breakthrough, British Female Solo, British Single ("All Around the World") and Best Video ("All Around the World"). She won the British Breakthrough Award and performed "All Around the World" at the ceremony. With "All Around the World" Stansfield also won two Ivor Novello Awards for Best Contemporary Song (1990) and Best International Song (1991). Stansfield also won a Billboard Music Award in category Best Newcomer in 1990. In 1991, she received an ASCAP Award in category Writer of the Most Performed Song ("All Around the World"). Stansfield also received two Silver Clef Awards in 1990: Best New Artist Award and Innovation Award. Other trophies include two DMC Awards in 1990 for Best Album and Best Artist. In 1991, Stansfield was also awarded with World Music Award for Best British Artist. At the 1991 Grammy Awards she was nominated as Best New Artist and Best Female Pop Vocal Performance ("All Around the World") but lost to Mariah Carey in both cases.

== Track listing ==
All tracks written by Lisa Stansfield, Ian Devaney and Andy Morris, except where noted. All tracks produced by Ian Devaney and Andy Morris, except "This Is the Right Time" and "People Hold On," produced by Coldcut

Affection track listing
No.	Title	Length
1.	"This Is the Right Time"	4:29
2.	"Mighty Love"	5:11
3.	"Sincerity"	4:47
4.	"The Love in Me"	5:01
5.	"All Around the World"	4:27
6.	"What Did I Do to You?"	4:48
7.	"Live Together"	6:10
8.	"You Can't Deny It"	5:36
9.	"Poison"	4:12
10.	"When Are You Coming Back?"	5:23
11.	"Affection" (CD and cassette only)	5:52
12.	"Wake Up Baby" (CD and cassette only)	3:58
13.	"The Way You Want It" (CD and cassette only)	4:56

North American edition
No.	Title	Length
1.	"All Around the World"	4:27
2.	"Mighty Love"	5:11
3.	"This Is the Right Time"	4:29
4.	"You Can't Deny It (U.S. Remix)"	4:31
5.	"What Did I Do to You? (Mark Saunders Club Remix)"	5:52
6.	"Affection" (CD and cassette only)	5:49
7.	"Live Together (New Version/Single Remix)"	4:36
8.	"Sincerity"	4:48
9.	"The Love in Me"	4:58
10.	"Poison"	4:16
11.	"When Are You Coming Back?"	5:15
12.	"Wake Up Baby" (CD and cassette only)	3:52
13.	"The Way You Want It" (CD and cassette only)	4:57

2003 remastered edition
No.	Title	Writer(s)	Length
1.	"This Is the Right Time"		4:30
2.	"Mighty Love"		5:11
3.	"Sincerity"		4:49
4.	"The Love in Me"		5:00
5.	"All Around the World"		4:25
6.	"What Did I Do to You?" (7" Version)		4:18
7.	"Live Together"		6:09
8.	"You Can't Deny It" (US Version)		4:27
9.	"Poison"		4:17
10.	"When Are You Coming Back?"		5:15
11.	"Affection"		5:41
12.	"Wake Up Baby"		3:56
13.	"The Way You Want It"		5:00
14.	"People Hold On" (Single Mix) (featuring Coldcut)	Matt Black, Jonathan More, Stansfield	3:57
15.	"My Apple Heart"		4:15
16.	"Lay Me Down"		4:13
17.	"Something's Happenin'"		3:46

2014 expanded 2CD + DVD set (disc one – CD)
No.	Title	Length
1.	"This Is the Right Time"	4:30
2.	"Mighty Love"	4:16
3.	"Sincerity"	4:48
4.	"The Love in Me"	5:02
5.	"All Around the World"	4:29
6.	"What Did I Do to You?"	4:50
7.	"Live Together"	6:10
8.	"You Can't Deny It"	5:31
9.	"Poison"	4:19
10.	"When Are You Coming Back?"	5:15
11.	"Affection"	5:52
12.	"Wake Up Baby"	3:54
13.	"The Way You Want It"	4:59
14.	"This Is the Right Time" (Miles Ahead Mix)	7:45
15.	"All Around the World" (Long Version)	7:08

2014 expanded 2CD + DVD set (disc two – CD)
No.	Title	Length
1.	"My Apple Heart"	5:17
2.	"Lay Me Down"	4:21
3.	"Something's Happenin'"	3:57
4.	"Sing It"	5:32
5.	"This Is the Right Time" (Extended Version)	5:40
6.	"All Around the World" (Around the House Mix)	6:03
7.	"Live Together" (Extended Version)	8:55
8.	"What Did I Do to You?" (Mark Saunders Remix)	5:52
9.	"You Can't Deny It" (Extended Version)	7:53
10.	"The Love in Me" (Extended Version)	7:06
11.	"This Is the Right Time" (Kick Mix)	6:45
12.	"All Around the World" (Runaway Love Mix)	4:37
13.	"Live Together" (Home Sweet Home Mix)	7:42

2014 expanded 2CD + DVD set (disc three – DVD)
No.	Title	Writer(s)	Length
1.	"People Hold On" (with Coldcut) (Promo Video)	Black, More, Stansfield
2.	"This Is the Right Time" (Promo Video)
3.	"All Around the World" (Promo Video)
4.	"Live Together" (Promo Video)
5.	"What Did I Do to You?" (Promo Video)
6.	"You Can't Deny It" (Promo Video)
7.	"This Is the Right Time" (US Version) (Promo Video)
8.	"This Is the Right Time" (Live! All Around the World)
9.	"Mighty Love" (Live! All Around the World)
10.	"You Can't Deny It" (Live! All Around the World)
11.	"The Love in Me" (Live! All Around the World)
12.	"Sincerity" (Live! All Around the World)
13.	"Poison" (Live! All Around the World)
14.	"Live Together" (Live! All Around the World)
15.	"Good Morning Heartache" (Live! All Around the World)	Irene Higginbotham, Ervin Drake, Dan Fisher
16.	"What Did I Do to You?" (Live! All Around the World)
17.	"All Around the World" (Live! All Around the World)
18.	"People Hold On" (Live! All Around the World)	Black, More, Stansfield
19.	"Affection" (Live! All Around the World)
20.	"The Way You Want It" (Live! All Around the World)
21.	"2014 Interview with Mark Goodier"

== Personnel ==
Credits taken from AllMusic.

- Lisa Stansfield – vocals
- Coldcut – producer
- Ian Devaney – producer, engineer, mixing, all instruments, programming, arrangements
- Kate Garner – photography
- Stephen Gibson – trumpet
- Felix Kendall – engineer
- Andy Morris – producer, engineer, mixing, all instruments, programming, arrangements, trumpet
- Tim Parry – executive producer
- Richard Scott – engineer
- Mark Saunders – mixing
- Jazz Summers – executive producer

== Charts ==
=== Weekly charts ===
Weekly chart performance for Affection
Chart (1989–1990)	Peak position
Australian Albums (ARIA)	7
Austrian Albums (Ö3 Austria)	1
Canada Top Albums/CDs (RPM)	7
Dutch Albums (Album Top 100)	6
European Albums (Top 100)	2
Finnish Albums (Suomen virallinen lista)	5
French Albums (SNEP)	21
German Albums (Offizielle Top 100)	2
Japanese Albums (Oricon)	96
New Zealand Albums (RMNZ)	5
Norwegian Albums (VG-lista)	6
Spanish Albums (PROMUSICAE)	2
Swedish Albums (Sverigetopplistan)	2
Swiss Albums (Schweizer Hitparade)	2
UK Albums (Official Charts)	2
US Billboard 200	9
US Top R&B/Hip-Hop Albums (Billboard)	5

=== Year-end charts ===
Year-end chart performance for Affection
Chart (1989)	Position
UK Albums (OCC)	29
Chart (1990)	Position
Australian Albums (ARIA)	76
Austrian Albums (Ö3 Austria)	8
Canada Top Albums/CDs (RPM)	37
Dutch Albums (Album Top 100)	73
European Albums (Music & Media)	4
French Albums (SNEP)	36
German Albums (Offizielle Top 100)	5
New Zealand Albums (RMNZ)	38
Norwegian Winter Period Albums (VG-lista)	8
Spanish Albums (PROMUSICAE)	20
Swiss Albums (Schweizer Hitparade)	16
UK Albums (OCC)	30
US Billboard 200	28
US Top R&B/Hip-Hop Albums (Billboard)	12

== Certifications and sales ==
Certifications for Affection
Region	Certification	Certified units/sales
Australia (ARIA)	Gold	35,000^{^}
Austria (IFPI Austria)	Gold	25,000^{*}
Canada (Music Canada)	Platinum	100,000^{^}
Finland (Musiikkituottajat)	Gold	26,706
France (SNEP)	Gold	100,000^{*}
Germany (BVMI)	Platinum	500,000^{^}
Netherlands (NVPI)	Gold	50,000^{^}
New Zealand (RMNZ)	Gold	7,500^{^}
Spain (Promusicae)	Platinum	127,000
Sweden (GLF)	Platinum	100,000^{^}
Switzerland (IFPI Switzerland)	Platinum	50,000^{^}
United Kingdom (BPI)	3× Platinum	900,000^{^}
United States (RIAA)	Platinum	1,000,000^{^}
Summaries
Worldwide	—	5,000,000
^{*} Sales figures based on certification alone.^{^} Shipments figures based on certification alone.

== Release history ==
Release history and formats for Affection
Region	Date	Label	Format	Catalog
Europe	20 November 1989	Arista	CD, cassette, LP	260 379
Japan	7 February 1990	Arista	CD, cassette, LP	A32D-98
North America	20 February 1990	Arista	CD, cassette, LP	ARCD-8554
Europe	2 June 2003	Arista	Remastered CD	82876 543732
Japan	22 November 2006	BMG Japan	Remastered CD	BVCM-37787
United Kingdom	10 November 2014	Edsel	2CD+DVD	EDSG 8053
Europe	21 November 2014	Edsel	2CD+DVD	EDSG 8053
