= VRT Top 30 number-one hits of 1990 =

These hits topped the Ultratop 50 in the Flanders region of Belgium in 1990.

Date	Artist	Title
January 6	Phil Collins	"Another Day in Paradise"
January 13	Phil Collins	"Another Day in Paradise"
January 20	Phil Collins	"Another Day in Paradise"
January 27	Phil Collins	"Another Day in Paradise"
February 3	Lisa Stansfield	"All Around the World"
February 10	Clouseau	"Daar Gaat Ze"
February 17	Clouseau	"Daar Gaat Ze"
February 24	Technotronic	"Get Up! (Before the Night Is Over)"
March 3	Technotronic	"Get Up! (Before the Night Is Over)"
March 10	Technotronic	"Get Up! (Before the Night Is Over)"
March 17	Sinéad O'Connor	"Nothing Compares 2 U"
March 24	Sinéad O'Connor	"Nothing Compares 2 U"
March 31	Sinéad O'Connor	"Nothing Compares 2 U"
April 7	Sinéad O'Connor	"Nothing Compares 2 U"
April 14	Sinéad O'Connor	"Nothing Compares 2 U"
April 21	Sinéad O'Connor	"Nothing Compares 2 U"
April 28	Michael Bolton	"How Am I Supposed to Live Without You"
May 5	Michael Bolton	"How Am I Supposed to Live Without You"
May 12	Guru Josh	"Infinity"
May 19	Madonna	"Vogue"
May 26	Vaya Con Dios	"What's a Woman?"
June 2	Vaya Con Dios	"What's a Woman?"
June 9	Vaya Con Dios	"What's a Woman?"
June 16	Vaya Con Dios	"What's a Woman?"
June 23	Vaya Con Dios	"What's a Woman?"
June 30	Vaya Con Dios	"What's a Woman?"
July 7	Vaya Con Dios	"What's a Woman?"
July 14	Vaya Con Dios	"What's a Woman?"
July 21	Gary Moore	"Still Got the Blues"
July 28	Gary Moore	"Still Got the Blues"
August 4	Adamski & Seal	"Killer"
August 11	Adamski & Seal	"Killer"
August 18	MC Hammer	"U Can't Touch This"
August 25	MC Hammer	"U Can't Touch This"
September 1	MC Hammer	"U Can't Touch This"
September 8	MC Hammer	"U Can't Touch This"
September 15	MC Hammer	"U Can't Touch This"
September 22	London Beat	"I've Been Thinking About You"
September 29	Lorca	"Ritmo de la noche"
October 6	Lorca	"Ritmo de la noche"
October 13	London Beat	"I've Been Thinking About You"
October 20	London Beat	"I've Been Thinking About You"
October 27	Matthias Reim	"Verdammt, ich lieb' dich"
November 3	Matthias Reim	"Verdammt, ich lieb' dich"
November 10	Matthias Reim	"Verdammt, ich lieb' dich"
November 17	Matthias Reim	"Verdammt, ich lieb' dich"
November 24	Matthias Reim	"Verdammt, ich lieb' dich"
December 1	Maria McKee	"Show Me Heaven"
December 8	Maria McKee	"Show Me Heaven"
December 15	Maria McKee	"Show Me Heaven"
December 22	Maria McKee	"Show Me Heaven"
December 29	Enigma	"Sadeness (Part I)"

== See also ==
- 1990 in music
