= Live Together =

Single by Lisa Stansfield

from the album Affection
- B-side: "Sing It"
- Released: 29 January 1990
- Genre: Soul
- Length: 6:10 (album version); 4:37 (7-inch)
- Label: Arista
- Songwriters: Lisa Stansfield; Ian Devaney; Andy Morris
- Producers: Ian Devaney; Andy Morris

Lisa Stansfield singles chronology
| "All Around the World" (1989) | "Live Together" (1990) | "What Did I Do to You?" (1990) |

Music video
- "Live Together" on YouTube

"Live Together" is a song by British singer-songwriter and actress Lisa Stansfield for her debut album, Affection (1989). It was written by Stansfield, Ian Devaney and Andy Morris, and produced by Devaney and Morris. It was released as the third European single on 29 January 1990 by Arista Records, and included previously unreleased song "Sing It" and remixes of "Live Together" created by Massive Attack and Steve Anderson. It became a hit in Europe, reaching top ten in the Netherlands, Belgium, the UK and Italy, and top forty in other European countries. The accompanying music video was directed by Philip Richardson, depicting Stansfield performing at a train station.

In 2003, the song was included on Biography: The Greatest Hits. In 2014, the remixes of "Live Together" and "Sing It" were included on the deluxe 2CD + DVD re-release of Affection and on People Hold On ... The Remix Anthology (also on The Collection 1989–2003).

== Critical reception ==
Upon the album release, The Atlanta Journal-Constitution wrote that Stansfield's voice "alternately soars, sobs and adds over-dubbed backup vocals" on self-penned tunes such as "Live Together". J.D. Considine from The Baltimore Sun praised her "warm, emotive voice", "seeming soulfully insinuating" through the song. A reviewer from Billboard magazine described it as "Gloria Gaynor-ish" and said the singer "shows just what powerful potential she has". Bob Stanley from Melody Maker viewed it as "a lacklustre follow-up by the girl with the Subbutea painted haircut". He added, "How does it compare to Lisa's other singles? More of the same only less so."

Pan-European magazine Music & Media stated that the re-recorded version of the track from Stansfield's debut LP is a good follow-up to "All Around the World". The reviewer noted further that the Philadelphia soul-type orchestration "helps to make this song an undoubted hit". David Giles from Music Week commented, "Another homage to the sound of Seventies soul which has got the orchestral parts exactly right. As a song, it's the equal of 'All Around the World', even if the lyrics are a bit drippy." Paul Simper from Number One felt there's a bit in the midst of "Live Together" "which oddly reminds one" of Eurythmics' "You Have Placed a Chill in My Heart".

=== Retrospective response ===
In a 2020 retrospective review, Matthew Hocter from Albumism described "Live Together" as "'70s inspired soul".

== Chart performance ==
"Live Together" entered the top 10 in Belgium, Italy, Luxembourg, the Netherlands and the United Kingdom. In the UK, the song peaked at number ten during its second week on the UK Singles Chart, on 11 February 1990, after having debuted at number 19 the week before. It became a top-20 hit in Finland, Ireland, Spain and Switzerland, as well as on the Eurochart Hot 100, peaking at number 19 in March 1990. Additionally, it was a top-30 hit in Austria and West Germany. Outside Europe, "Live Together" peaked at numbers 23 and 62 in New Zealand and Australia, respectively. In West Asia, it became a top-30 hit also in Israel, peaking at number 23 on 25 March 1990.

== Music video ==
The music video for "Live Together" was directed by Philip Richardson. He had previously directed the video for "All Around the World".

In the video, Stansfield stands at a train station. She sings in front of the train tracks. The video has a blue tone. Stansfield is wearing a big cap and a long coat. Her kiss curls are visible. Some scenes also see her singing on the bridge over the railroad tracks. Several trains come and go throughout the video. In the end, she runs towards a young man standing on the station and throws himself over him. They embrace each other. As the video ends, they walk away while holding each other around.

== Track listings ==
- European 7-inch single (New Version)
1. "Live Together" (New Version) – 4:37
2. "Sing It" (Edit) – 3:56
- European CD single (New Version)
1. "Live Together" (New Version) – 4:37
2. "Sing It" (Edit) – 3:56
3. "Live Together" (Extended Version Edit) – 7:02
4. "Live Together" (Big Beat Mix Edit) – 3:50
- European 12-inch single (New Version)
1. "Live Together" (Extended Version) – 8:55
2. "Live Together" (Big Beat Mix) – 5:00
3. "Sing It" – 5:32
- European CD and 12-inch single (Remix)
1. "Live Together" (Home Sweet Home Mix) – 7:42
2. "Live Together" (Live It Up) – 6:42
3. "Live Together" (Mood Mix) – 5:36

== Charts ==
=== Weekly charts ===
Weekly chart performance for "Live Together"
| Chart (1990) | Peak position |
|---|---|
| Australia (ARIA) | 62 |
| Austria (Ö3 Austria Top 40) | 30 |
| Belgium (Ultratop 50 Flanders) | 7 |
| Europe (European Hot 100 Singles) | 19 |
| Finland (Suomen virallinen lista) | 16 |
| Ireland (IRMA) | 11 |
| Israel (Israeli Singles Chart) | 23 |
| Italy (Musica e dischi) | 10 |
| Italy Airplay (Music & Media) | 2 |
| Luxembourg (Radio Luxembourg) | 6 |
| Netherlands (Dutch Top 40) | 5 |
| Netherlands (Single Top 100) | 11 |
| New Zealand (Recorded Music NZ) | 23 |
| Spain (AFYVE) | 17 |
| Switzerland (Schweizer Hitparade) | 15 |
| UK Singles (Official Charts) | 10 |
| West Germany (Media Control) | 23 |

=== Year-end charts ===
Year-end chart performance for "Live Together"
| Chart (1990) | Position |
|---|---|
| Netherlands (Dutch Top 40) | 69 |
| UK Club Chart (Record Mirror) | 39 |
