= What Did I Do to You? =

1990 single by Lisa Stansfield

Single by Lisa Stansfield

from the album Affection
- B-side: "Something's Happenin"
- Released: 30 April 1990
- Length: 4:48
- Label: Arista
- Songwriters: Lisa Stansfield; Ian Devaney; Andy Morris
- Producers: Ian Devaney; Andy Morris

Lisa Stansfield singles chronology
"Live Together" (1990)	"What Did I Do to You?" (1990)	"You Can't Deny It" (1990)

Music video
- "What Did I Do to You?" on YouTube

"What Did I Do to You?" is a song by British singer-songwriter and actress Lisa Stansfield from her debut album, Affection (1989). It was written by Stansfield, Ian Devaney and Andy Morris, and produced by Devaney and Morris. The song was released as the fourth European single on 30 April 1990. It included three previously unreleased songs written by Stansfield, Devaney and Morris: "My Apple Heart," "Lay Me Down" and "Something's Happenin'." "What Did I Do to You?" was remixed by Mark Saunders and by the Grammy Award-winning American house music DJ and producer, David Morales. The single became a top forty hit in the European countries, reaching number 15 in Italy, number 18 in Finland, number 20 in Ireland and number 25 in the United Kingdom. "What Did I Do to You?" was also released in Japan.

In 2014, the remixes of "What Did I Do to You?" were included on the deluxe 2CD + DVD re-release of Affection and on People Hold On ... The Remix Anthology. They were also featured on The Collection 1989–2003 box set (2014), including previously unreleased Red Zone Mix by David Morales.

== Critical reception ==
The song received positive reviews from music critics. In a 2019 retrospective review, Matthew Hocter from Albumism declared it as a "upbeat offering". Upon the release, Todd Caudle from Gazette Telegraph wrote that Stansfield's "sensuous voice delivers beautiful love lyrics" in "What Did I Do to You?". David Giles from Music Week said it's "beautifully performed" by the singer. A reviewer from Reading Eagle opined that the song "would be right at home on the Saturday Night Fever soundtrack." Parry Gettelman from The Sentinel felt it "sounds too much like a speeded-up "The Hustle" to be true, but Stansfield makes it credible."

== Chart performance ==
"What Did I Do to You?" entered the top 20 in Finland, Ireland and Italy while peaking within the top 30 in the United Kingdom. In the UK, the song peaked at number 25 on the UK Singles Chart on 13 May 1990, after having debuted as number 29 the week before. Additionally, it was a top-40 hit in both Belgium and the Netherlands, as well as peaking at number 56 on the Eurochart Hot 100 in June 1990.

== Music video ==
A music video was produced to promote the single, directed by Philip Richardson, who had previously directed the videos for "All Around the World" and "Live Together". It features Stansfield with her kiss curls, dressed in a white outfit and performing with her band on a stage in front of a jumping audience.

== Track listings ==
- European and UK 7-inch single
1. "What Did I Do to You?" (Mark Saunders Remix Edit) – 4:20
2. "Something's Happenin'" – 3:59
- European, UK and Japanese CD single
1. "What Did I Do to You?" (Mark Saunders Remix Edit) – 4:20
2. "My Apple Heart" – 5:19
3. "Lay Me Down" – 4:17
4. "Something's Happenin'" – 3:59
- UK 10-inch single and 7-inch EP
1. "What Did I Do to You?" (Mark Saunders Remix) – 5:52
2. "My Apple Heart" – 5:19
3. "Lay Me Down" – 4:17
4. "Something's Happenin'" – 3:59
- European and UK 12-inch single
1. "What Did I Do to You?" (Morales Mix) – 7:59
2. "My Apple Heart" – 4:22
3. "Lay Me Down" – 3:19
4. "Something's Happenin'" – 3:15

== Charts ==
Chart (1990)	Peak position
Belgium (Ultratop 50 Flanders)	37
Europe (Eurochart Hot 100)	56
Finland (Suomen virallinen lista)	18
Ireland (IRMA)	20
Italy (Musica e dischi)	15
Italy Airplay (Music & Media)	2
Netherlands (Dutch Top 40 Tipparade)	2
Netherlands (Single Top 100)	38
UK Singles (Official Charts)	25
West Germany (GfK)	43

== Release history ==
Region	Date	Format(s)	Label(s)	Ref.
United Kingdom	30 April 1990	7-inch vinyl; 12-inch vinyl	Arista	
United Kingdom	7 May 1990	CD; cassette	Arista	
United Kingdom	14 May 1990	10-inch vinyl	Arista	
Japan	21 July 1990	CD	Arista	
Australia	23 July 1990	7-inch vinyl; 12-inch vinyl; CD; cassette	Arista	
