= Set Your Loving Free =

1992 single by Lisa Stansfield

Single by Lisa Stansfield

from the album Real Love
- Released: 25 May 1992
- Genre: R&B; soul; pop; dance
- Length: 5:03
- Label: Arista
- Songwriters: Lisa Stansfield; Ian Devaney; Andy Morris
- Producers: Ian Devaney; Andy Morris

Lisa Stansfield singles chronology
"Time to Make You Mine" (1992)	"Set Your Loving Free" (1992)	"A Little More Love" (1992)

Music video
- "Set Your Loving Free" on YouTube

"Set Your Loving Free" is a song by British singer, songwriter and actress Lisa Stansfield from her second album, Real Love (1991). It was written by her with Ian Devaney and Andy Morris, and produced by Devaney and Morris. The song was released by Arista Records as the fourth European single on 25 May 1992. It included "Whenever You're Gone", featured on the Japanese edition of Real Love only. The Nick Brandt-directed music video, starring Linus Roache, was also released. The song reached number 28 in the United Kingdom and number 20 on the US Billboard Hot Dance Club Songs chart, where it was released as B-side of "A Little More Love." "Set Your Loving Free" was remixed by Masters at Work (Little Louie Vega and Kenny "Dope" Gonzalez).

In 2003, it was included on Biography: The Greatest Hits. In 2014, the remixes of "Set Your Loving Free" and "Whenever You're Gone" were also included on the deluxe 2CD + DVD re-release of Real Love and on People Hold On ... The Remix Anthology (also on The Collection 1989–2003).

== Chart performance ==
"Set Your Loving Free" was a notable hit on the charts, although not commercially as successful as the previous singles from Real Love. The song entered the top 30 in the UK, peaking at number 28 in its first week at the UK Singles Chart on 31 May 1992. It spent one more week within the UK Top 40 (32), before leaving, and did also peak at numbers 18 and 22 on the UK Dance Singles chart and the UK Club Chart. Additionally, the single entered the top 40 in the Netherlands (42) and the top 60 in Germany (57), as well as peaking at number 75 on the Eurochart Hot 100. Outside Europe, "Set Your Loving Free" was quite successful in the US, reaching number 20 on the Billboard Hot Dance Club Songs chart, with a total of eight weeks within the chart. In Australia, it peaked at number 164.

== Critical reception ==
The song received positive reviews from many music critics. AllMusic editor Alex Henderson described it as "sleek". Asbjørn Bakke from Norwegian Arbeiderbladet praised it as "magnificent". A reviewer from Lennox Herald named it "another hit". Scott Sterling from The Michigan Daily felt "this high-energy workout rivals even the O'Jays at their best." Robbert Tilli from Music & Media wrote that Stansfield's "soulful voice—a UK equivalent of Mariah Carey's and Whitney Houston's—is made for slow love songs" like "Set Your Loving Free". Alan Jones from Music Week commented, "After the pent-up passion of 'Time to Make You Mine', it's a much lighter and immediately accessible song, perfectly suited to lazy, summer days." James Hamilton from the Record Mirror Dance Update stated that the song is "sexily teased and crooned" by the singer. Stephen Holden from Rolling Stone magazine described it as "the inspirational lover's promise".

== Track listings ==
- European 7-inch single
1. "Set Your Loving Free" (edit) – 4:09
2. "Whenever You're Gone" – 4:06
- European 12-inch single
1. "Set Your Loving Free" (Kenlou 12-inch) – 7:26
2. "Set Your Loving Free" (extended version) – 6:00
3. "Make Love to Ya" (The Floor mix) – 6:26
4. "Make Love to Ya" (Light Me Up mix) – 5:02
- European and Australian CD maxi-single
1. "Set Your Loving Free" (edit) – 4:09
2. "Whenever You're Gone" – 4:06
3. "Set Your Loving Free" (Kenlou 12-inch) – 7:26

== Charts ==
Chart (1992)	Peak position
Australia (ARIA)	164
Europe (European Hot 100 Singles)	75
Germany (Official German Charts)	57
Netherlands (Dutch Top 40)	36
Netherlands (Single Top 100)	42
UK Singles (Official Charts)	28
UK Airplay (Music Week)	8
UK Dance (Music Week)	18
UK Club Chart (Music Week)	22
US Dance Club Songs (Billboard)	20
