= This Is the Right Time =

Single by Lisa Stansfield

from the album Affection
- Released: 31 July 1989
- Recorded: 1989
- Genre: Dance-pop; house
- Length: 4:29
- Label: Arista
- Songwriters: Lisa Stansfield; Ian Devaney; Andy Morris
- Producer: Coldcut

Lisa Stansfield singles chronology
"My Telephone" (1989)	"This Is the Right Time" (1989)	"All Around the World" (1989)

Music video
- "This Is the Right Time" (EU) on YouTube

Music video
- "This Is the Right Time" (US) on YouTube

"This Is the Right Time" is a song by English singer-songwriter and actress Lisa Stansfield from her debut solo studio album, Affection (1989). It was written by Stansfield, Ian Devaney and Andy Morris, and produced by Coldcut. The song was released as the album's first European single on 31 July 1989, by Arista Records and received positive reviews from music critics. One year later in North America, "This Is the Right Time" was released as the third single from Affection on 30 July 1990. Two different music videos were also produced to accompany the single.

"This Is the Right Time" was commercially successful in several countries, reaching number eight in Italy, number 12 in Canada, number 13 in the United Kingdom, number 17 in West Germany and number 20 in Austria. In the United States, it peaked at numbers 18 and 21 on the US Cash Box Top 100 and Billboard Hot 100 charts, number one on the Dance Club Songs chart and number 13 on the Hot R&B/Hip-Hop Songs chart. In 2003, the song was included on Stansfield's first greatest hits compilation album, Biography: The Greatest Hits. In 2014, the remixes of "This Is the Right Time" were included on the deluxe 2CD + DVD re-release of Affection and on her third remix album, People Hold On ... The Remix Anthology (also on The Collection 1989–2003).

== Release ==
"This Is the Right Time" was released as the album's first European single on 31 July 1989, by Arista Records. It included "Affection", "Big Thing" (recorded by Stansfield's 1980s band Blue Zone) and remixes created by David Dorrell, CJ Mackintosh, Paul Witts and Eddie Gordon. One year later, on 30 July 1990, "This Is the Right Time" was issued as the third North American single from Affection. It included the previously unreleased track, "My Apple Heart", and new remixes created by Shep Pettibone and Yvonne Turner. In September 1990, just before Stansfield's European tour, the double A-side single "This Is the Right Time"/"You Can't Deny It" with new US remixes was released in selected European countries. In Japan, "This Is the Right Time" was released on 3 October 1990.

== Chart performance ==
The song was commercially successful on several continents, reaching number eight in both Israel and Italy, number 12 in Canada, number 13 in the United Kingdom, number 17 in West Germany and number 20 in Austria. In the United States, it peaked at numbers 18 and 21 on the US Cash Box Top 100 and Billboard Hot 100 charts. The song also reached number-one on the Billboard Hot Dance Club Songs chart and number 13 on the Billboard Hot R&B/Hip-Hop Songs chart.

== Critical reception ==
AllMusic editor Alex Henderson complimented the song as a "disco masterpiece" and a "love-and-togetherness anthem". Bill Coleman from Billboard magazine commented, "Spirited NRG-etic highlight from Stansfield's debut is uplifting, both musically and lyrically." Dave Sholin from the Gavin Report felt the jazz/soul flavoring in her brand of pop "gives the music a distinctive sound polished off by the stunning vocal talent of this singer/songwriter. With songs this hot, Lisa and her partners Ian Devaney and Andy Morris should be getting lots of time—make that air time in the years ahead." Dennis Hunt from Los Angeles Times remarked that songs like "This Is the Right Time" "reflect the soulfulness of the old Philly sound." Pan-European magazine Music & Media described it as a commercial 70s sounding disco single "convincingly produced" by British electronic music duo Coldcut. David Giles from Music Week praised it as "a very effervescent, bouncy number", reminiscent of Yazz. He noted that "there are nods to Seventies soul in the vocals and the beat is house-influenced, so big bucks beckon."

Gene Sandbloom from The Network Forty stated that this latest single from her Rolling Stone four-star rated LP "maintains Stansfield's stunning soul licks while adding more tempo and house sounds than any of her previously released tracks. A great all-demo track that picks up where "All Around the World" left off, then digs a little deeper." A reviewer from Reading Eagle felt it "boasts an irresistible romantic lilt." Marisa Fox from Spin found that the track was "in a similar vein" like "People Hold On", declaring it as "perfect pop rollicking over a regal R&B rhythm. The tune bubbles up to your head, filled with inspiration and hope." John Nichols from Toledo Blade named "This Is the Right Time" one of the "standout" tracks on Affection, adding that it "has a infectious Latin beat." Joe Brown from The Washington Post also named it one of the best of the tunes, and a "can't-miss club-stormer", noting that it have "a giddy, instant familiarity."

== Music video ==
Two different music videos were made to promote the single. The first version, made for the European market was directed by Big TV!. The second video was produced for the North American market and was directed by Jimmy Fletcher. It features Stansfield cutting off her kiss-curls and performing in front of a blue moon, wearing a black dress. This version was later published on Stansfield's official YouTube channel in December 2012, and had generated more than 7.5 million views as of January 2023.

== Track listing and formats ==
- European 7" single / Japanese CD single
1. "This Is the Right Time" (Single Version) – 4:12
2. "Affection" (Edit) – 4:22
- European CD single
1. "This Is the Right Time" (Single Version) – 4:12
2. "This Is the Right Time" (Miles Ahead Mix Edit) – 5:25
3. "Affection" (Edit) – 4:22
4. "Big Thing" (Extended Edit) – 5:40
- European 12" single
1. "This Is the Right Time" (Extended Version) – 5:40
2. "Affection" – 5:52
3. "This Is the Right Time" (Miles Ahead Mix) – 7:45
- European 12" single (Kick Mix)
1. "This Is the Right Time" (Kick Mix) – 6:45
2. "This Is the Right Time" (Club Dub) – 6:15
3. "Affection" – 5:52
- UK 12" single (Kick Mix)
1. "This Is the Right Time" (Kick Mix) – 6:45
2. "This Is the Right Time" (Club Dub) – 6:15
3. "Big Thing" (Extended) – 6:40
- US 7" single
1. "This Is the Right Time" (Single Version) – 4:12
2. "My Apple Heart" – 5:17
- US 12" single
1. "This Is the Right Time" (Extended Remix) – 9:44
2. "This Is the Right Time" (Dub Mix) – 4:42
3. "This Is the Right Time" (The Rhythm Mix) – 7:51
4. "This Is the Right Time" (The Rhythm Dub) – 6:51
5. "This Is the Right Time" (The Rhythm Edit) – 4:30
- 1990 European 7" single (US Mixes)
1. "This Is the Right Time" (US Mix) – 4:12
2. "You Can't Deny It" (US Mix) – 4:22
- 1990 European CD single (US Mixes)
1. "This Is the Right Time" (US Mix) – 4:12
2. "You Can't Deny It" (Yvonne Turner Mix) – 6:08
3. "This Is the Right Time" (Shep Pettibone Mix) – 6:33
- 1990 European 12" single (US Mixes)
1. "This Is the Right Time" (Shep Pettibone Mix) – 6:33
2. "This Is the Right Time" (Yvonne Turner Mix) – 7:51
3. "You Can't Deny It" (Yvonne Turner Mix) – 6:08
- 1990 promotional single
1. "This Is the Right Time" (Dimitri from Paris Remix) – 5:56
- 2006 US digital Dance Vault Mixes
1. "This Is the Right Time" (Kick Mix) – 6:45
2. "This Is the Right Time" (Club Dub) – 6:15
3. "This Is the Right Time" (Single Version) – 4:12
4. "This Is the Right Time" (Shep 12-inch) – 9:44
5. "This Is the Right Time" (Yvonne Turner Mix) – 4:30

== Charts ==
=== Weekly charts ===
Chart (1989–1990)	Peak position
Australia (ARIA)	138
Austria (Ö3 Austria Top 40)	20
Canada Top Singles (RPM)	12
Canada Adult Contemporary (RPM)	26
Canada Dance/Urban (RPM)	4
Europe (European Hot 100 Singles)	51
France (SNEP)	49
Israel (Israeli Singles Chart)	8
Italy (Musica e dischi)	8
Luxembourg (Radio Luxembourg)	11
Spain Radio (AFYVE)	39
UK Singles (Official Charts)	13
US Billboard Hot 100	21
US Dance Club Songs (Billboard)	1
US Hot R&B/Hip-Hop Songs (Billboard)	13
US Cash Box Top 100	18
West Germany (Official German Charts)	17

=== Year-end charts ===
Chart (1990)	Position
Canada Dance/Urban (RPM)	17
US Hot Dance Club Songs (Billboard)	32

== See also ==
- List of number-one dance singles of 1990 (U.S.)
