= People Hold On ... The Remix Anthology =

2014 remix album by Lisa Stansfield

Remix album by Lisa Stansfield
- Released: 10 November 2014
- Recorded: 1989–2001
- Genre: Dance
- Label: Edsel

Lisa Stansfield chronology
Seven (2014)	People Hold On ... The Remix Anthology (2014)	The Collection 1989–2003 (2014)

People Hold On ... The Remix Anthology is a remix album by British singer Lisa Stansfield, released by Edsel Records on 10 November 2014. It contains remixes of songs originally included on Stansfield's albums released between 1989 and 2001. The tracks were remixed by various prominent producers. In Europe, the album was issued on 21 November 2014.

== Content ==
The album was released as a three-disc set in the United Kingdom on 10 November 2014 and in Europe on 21 November 2014. It includes thirty-three remixes of songs from "People Hold On" (1989) to "Let's Just Call It Love" (2001). Over the years since, Stansfield's songs were remixed by various prominent producers, including David Morales, Frankie Knuckles, Hex Hector, Masters at Work (Little Louie Vega and Kenny "Dope" Gonzalez), Shep Pettibone, The 45 King, Wyclef Jean and many others. This remastered three-disc anthology brings together thirty-three remixes, some of them previously unreleased, with a twenty-eight-page booklet featuring photos, memorabilia, lyrics and brand new sleeve notes. People Hold On ... The Remix Anthology was also released as a part of The Collection 1989–2003 on 10 November 2014 and in Europe on 21 November 2014.

The previously unreleased tracks on this album include: "All Around the World" (Attack Mix), "What Did I Do to You?" (Red Zone Mix), "The Love in Me" (12" Remix), "Time to Make You Mine" (Sunship Mix), three remixes of "Never, Never Gonna Give You Up" (Frankie's Classic Club Mix, Franktified Off the Hook Dub and After Hours Mix), "Never Gonna Fall" (Wyclef Remix) and "Let's Just Call It Love" (Feel It Mix).

== Track listing ==
Disc one
No.	Title	Writer(s)	Producer(s)	Length
1.	"People Hold On" (Full Length Disco Mix)	Lisa Stansfield, Matt Black, Jonathan More	Coldcut	9:24
2.	"What Did I Do to You?" (Morales Mix)	Stansfield, Ian Devaney, Andy Morris	Devaney, Morris	7:59
3.	"Change" (Ultimate Club Mix)	Stansfield, Devaney, Morris	Devaney, Morris	7:54
4.	"Never, Never Gonna Give You Up" (Frankie's Classic Club Mix)	Barry White	Devaney, Peter Mokran	8:15
5.	"This Is the Right Time" (The Rhythm Mix)	Stansfield, Devaney, Morris	Coldcut	7:51
6.	"The Real Thing" (K-Klassic Mix)	Stansfield, Devaney	Devaney, Mokran	8:39
7.	"Let's Just Call It Love" (Feel It Mix)	Stansfield, Devaney, Richard Darbyshire	Devaney	7:42
8.	"Make Love to Ya" (Light Me Up Mix)	Stansfield, Devaney, Morris	Devaney, Morris	5:02
9.	"Set Your Loving Free" (Dubmaster Edit)	Stansfield, Devaney, Morris	Devaney, Morris	4:42
10.	"Time to Make You Mine" (Sunship Mix)	Stansfield, Devaney, Morris	Devaney, Morris	6:00
11.	"All Around the World" (The Global Quest)	Stansfield, Devaney, Morris	Devaney, Morris	6:17

Disc two
No.	Title	Writer(s)	Producer(s)	Length
1.	"Live Together" (Live It Up)	Stansfield, Devaney, Morris	Devaney, Morris	6:42
2.	"This Is the Right Time" (Shep Pettibone Extended Remix)	Stansfield, Devaney, Morris	Coldcut	9:44
3.	"I'm Leavin'" (Hex Hector N.Y.C. Rough Mix)	Crayge Lindesay, Telisa Stinson	Devaney, Mokran	10:09
4.	"Let's Just Call It Love" (Bass City Rollaz Rollin' Dub)	Stansfield, Devaney, Darbyshire	Devaney	5:52
5.	"Never Gonna Fall" (Wyclef Remix)	Stansfield, Devaney	Devaney, Mokran	3:52
6.	"Set Your Loving Free" (Low Life Mix)	Stansfield, Devaney, Morris	Devaney, Morris	5:47
7.	"Never, Never Gonna Give You Up" (After Hours Mix)	White	Devaney, Mokran	7:10
8.	"The Love in Me" (12" Remix)	Stansfield, Devaney, Morris	Devaney, Morris	7:10
9.	"You Can't Deny It" (Sky King Mix)	Stansfield, Devaney, Morris	Devaney, Morris	8:21
10.	"What Did I Do to You?" (Anti Poll Tax Dub)	Stansfield, Devaney, Morris	Devaney, Morris	6:31
11.	"Change" (Metamorphosis Mix)	Stansfield, Devaney, Morris	Devaney, Morris	7:54

Disc three
No.	Title	Writer(s)	Producer(s)	Length
1.	"All Around the World" (American Club Remix)	Stansfield, Devaney, Morris	Devaney, Morris	11:34
2.	"The Line" (Pure Funk Mix)	Stansfield, Devaney, Terry Gamwell	Devaney, Mokran	4:20
3.	"Change" (Bone-Idol Mix)	Stansfield, Devaney, Morris	Devaney, Morris	5:57
4.	"Live Together" (Big Beat Mix)	Stansfield, Devaney, Morris	Devaney, Morris	5:00
5.	"The Real Thing" (Yūtenji Mix)	Stansfield, Devaney	Devaney, Mokran	4:55
6.	"You Can't Deny It" (Yvonne Turner Extended Remix)	Stansfield, Devaney, Morris	Devaney, Morris	7:39
7.	"The Line" (Ian O'Brien's Benfleet 3:30 Mix)	Stansfield, Devaney, Gamwell	Devaney, Mokran	10:06
8.	"Never, Never Gonna Give You Up" (Franktified Off the Hook Dub)	White	Devaney, Mokran	7:14
9.	"What Did I Do to You?" (Red Zone Mix)	Stansfield, Devaney, Morris	Devaney, Morris	7:45
10.	"Time to Make You Mine" (In My Dreams Mix)	Stansfield, Devaney, Morris	Devaney, Morris	9:24
11.	"All Around the World" (Attack Mix)	Stansfield, Devaney, Morris	Devaney, Morris	5:00

== Release history ==
Region	Date	Label	Format	Catalog
United Kingdom	10 November 2014	Edsel	3 CD	7 40155 30253 5
Europe	21 November 2014	Edsel	3 CD	7 40155 30253 5
