= All Around the World (Lisa Stansfield song) =

1989 single by Lisa Stansfield

- Artwork for releases outside North America (North American releases use a variant of the parent album's artwork)

Single by Lisa Stansfield

from the album Affection
- B-side: "Wake Up Baby"; "The Way You Want It"
- Released: 16 October 1989
- Genre: R&B; new jack swing
- Length: 4:28
- Label: Arista
- Songwriters: Lisa Stansfield; Ian Devaney; Andy Morris
- Producers: Ian Devaney; Andy Morris

Lisa Stansfield singles chronology
"This Is the Right Time" (1989)	"All Around the World" (1989)	"Live Together" (1990)

Music video
- "All Around the World" on YouTube

"All Around the World" is a song by English singer, songwriter and actress Lisa Stansfield from her debut studio album, Affection (1989). It was released as the album's second single in 1989 by Arista Records. It was written by Stansfield, Ian Devaney and Andy Morris, and produced by Devaney and Morris.

The song received favorable reviews from music critics, and its accompanying music video was directed by Philip Richardson. Songwriters, Stansfield, Devaney and Morris, received the 1989 Ivor Novello Award for Best Song Musically and Lyrically. "All Around the World" was also nominated for the Grammy Award for Best Female Pop Vocal Performance at the 33rd Annual Grammy Awards. Additionally, Stansfield was nominated for the Grammy Award for Best New Artist. The song became the first of two UK number-one singles for Stansfield and the first of eight UK top-10 hits. In the US, it peaked at number three on both the Billboard Hot 100 and Cash Box Top 100.

In 2003, "All Around the World" was included on Biography: The Greatest Hits. In 2014, the remixes of "All Around the World" were included on the deluxe 2CD + DVD re-releases of Affection, Face Up and on the People Hold On ... The Remix Anthology compilation (also on The Collection 1989–2003).

== Background and release ==
"All Around the World was top of most. Over the years, a lot of people have told me the song helped them through a difficult period. That's beautiful, to know you've helped someone in that way. The song literally took us around the world, four times. I suppose you have to be careful what you sing, because you might have to do it."

— Lisa Stansfield talking about the song.

Stansfield co-wrote the lyrics of "All Around the World" with her former bandmates Ian Devaney and Andy Morris from Blue Zone. In a 2019 interview, Stansfield recalled the process when the song was made:

I came into the studio, and Ian was messing around at the piano. He had a melody, and I just started singing: "Been around the world and I, I, I..." Everyone laughed but Ian said, "Wait, it's really good, that." It just came into my head – it was nonsense, but had a really good feel to it. "I, I, I" became the main hook. We'd no idea how massive it would become.

The song came down quickly and on low budget. The vocal part was made in only two takes and real strings were put on afterwards. The song is largely influenced by American singer-songwriter Barry White. As a tribute to him, they made a spoken intro on "All Around the World" like the one on the album version of White's "Let the Music Play", only shorter.

== Critical reception ==
The song received favorable reviews from many music critics. Bill Coleman from Billboard magazine felt it "sports that all-too-familiar Soul II Soul-ish feel but it's the lyric and Stansfield's emotive vocal which take it to the next level." J.D. Considine from The Baltimore Sun complimented her "warm, emotive voice", "summoning the vocal authority of an Anita Baker or Dionne Warwick with 'All Around the World'." Ernest Hardy from Cash Box stated that "it's her earthy vocals swarthed in whirling strings and placed against a soft beat that sets toes tapping, shoulders swaying and heads bopping." He added that "there's no denying that Stansfield has released one of 1990s best singles. What a way to start the year." A reviewer from The Dallas Morning News called it "infectious". Greg Sandow from Entertainment Weekly found that the singer "might be hurtling right to the top of the charts. Can we listen to her soberly? We drive each other crazy, she sings, in a voice like a suffocated flame. No two people ever felt this way, she wants her lucky lover to know." Swedish Expressen wrote that Stansfield "sings like an older black woman. An old-fashioned kind of song, very good." David Quantick from NME said that "Stansfield's voice is pretty remarkable. There's a bit on 'All Around the World' where she sounds like all the Jackson Five at the same time."

Paul Simper from Number One named it "the most super swooshy dance single of the year". A reviewer from Reading Eagle described it as a "hauntingly seductive" track that "revolves around a classic hook." Amy Linden for Rolling Stone remarked that Stansfield "accomplishes what she has to with disarming ease. The way she reaches for the high notes ('What Did I Do to You?') and the way her voice slinks around the line so-oo sad in 'All Around the World' show that this is someone who knows her roots – even if they aren't really hers." Siân Pattenden from Smash Hits wrote, "It's quite similar to her last hit 'This Is the Right Time' in that it's a slower kind of dance "vibe" which is all rather pleasant." Steven Daly from Spin viewed it as "a sensational piece of self-invention around the kind of voice that vaporizes all criticism." John Nichols from Toledo Blade praised it as "dazzling", and stated that Stansfield's voice "is everywhere it is should be – whispering, soaring, going deep and then going loud. There is no doubt she owns a musical gift." An editor from USA Today said that 'All Around the World' "has knocked the socks off listeners ... well, all around the world."

=== Retrospective response ===
In a 2019 retrospective review, Matthew Hocter from Albumism named the song "sultry and heartbreakingly beautiful". AllMusic editor Alex Henderson described it as a "melancholy, Barry White-influenced single" and noted further that "it was obvious that not since Teena Marie had a white female singer performed R&B so convincingly." Tom Ewing of Freaky Trigger said in 2010, that 'All Around the World' "is a song about guilt and loss, it's no surprise she doesn't sound quite so joyful."

== Commercial performance ==
"All Around the World" peaking at number one in Austria (for six weeks), the Netherlands (four weeks), Norway (three weeks), the United Kingdom (two weeks), Spain (two weeks) and Belgium (one week). It also peaked at number two in Italy and West Germany, number three in Ireland and Switzerland, number four in Sweden, and number seven in Finland. In the United States, "All Around the World" reached number three on both the Billboard Hot 100 and Cash Box Top 100, and topped the Billboard Hot Black Singles, Dance Club Play, and 12-inch Singles Sales charts. Stansfield became the first white woman to top the R&B chart since Teena Marie did in 1988 with "Ooo La La La." On the Adult Contemporary chart, the song peaked at number seven. In Canada, "All Around the World" topped The Record's Retail Singles chart, reached number three on both the RPM 100 Singles and Adult Contemporary charts, and peaked at number one on the RPM Dance chart. "All Around the World" also reached number nine in Australia and number 10 in New Zealand. The single was certified platinum in the United States for selling over one million copies and gold in the United Kingdom, Australia, Germany, Austria and Sweden.

== Music video ==
The accompanying music video of "All Around the World" was directed by Philip Richardson. It was nominated as Best New Artist in a Video on the MTV Video Music Awards in 1990. The video opens with a close-up of Stansfield in black-and-white speaking the intro. As the song begins, the camera circle around Stansfield, now in colours. The backdrop is a world map. Her hair is very short, she wears red lipstick and her famous kiss curls. Next she sits outdoors in the rain, performing on the stairs in front of a house. Other scenes shows Stansfield singing, while she rotates in the middle of a ring of men standing next to each other as the camera follows her round. Towards the end, she stands in the rain and sings as the raindrops are falling on her face.

== 1992, 2003 and 2014 versions ==
In 1992, Stansfield re-recorded "All Around the World" as a duet with Barry White. This version was included on her single "Time to Make You Mine" (March 1992). All artist royalties from this record were donated to the charity Trading Places. The Peter Stuart-directed music video for the duet version was also released. In November 1992, this duet version was also included on White's retrospective box set, Just for You. In 2003, Stansfield released Biography: The Greatest Hits which was promoted by her signature song, "All Around the World." In the United States, the promotional single included remixes created by Norty Cotto and reached number thirty-four on the Billboard's Hot Dance Club Songs. The digital promo single with remix by Junior Vasquez was also released.

In 2014, the remixes of "All Around the World" were included on the deluxe 2CD + DVD re-releases of Affection, Face Up and on the People Hold On ... The Remix Anthology compilation (also on The Collection 1989–2003). Affection re-release includes: Long Version, Around the House Mix and Runaway Love Mix, all from 1989. Face Up 2014 re-release features remixes from 2003: Norty Cotto Remix, Norty's World Dub and Junior Vasquez Earth Anthem. Finally, People Hold On...The Remix Anthology includes: The Global Quest from 1989, American Club Remix from 1990 and previously unreleased Attack Mix by The 45 King.

== Track listings ==
- Australian and European 7-invh single; Japanese CD single
1. "All Around the World" – 4:22
2. "Wake Up Baby" – 3:58
- European CD single
1. "All Around the World" – 4:22
2. "All Around the World" (Long Version) – 7:02
3. "Wake Up Baby" – 3:58
4. "The Way You Want It" (Edit) – 4:16
- Australian and European 12-inch single
1. "All Around the World" (Long Version) – 7:02
2. "Wake Up Baby" – 3:58
3. "The Way You Want It" (Edit) – 4:16
- European 12-inch single (Remix)
1. "All Around the World" (Around the House Mix) – 6:03
2. "This Is the Right Time" (Accapella) – 2:30
3. "All Around the World" (Runaway Love Mix) – 4:37
4. "The Way You Want It" – 4:56
- US 7-inch single
1. "All Around the World" – 4:21
2. "Affection" – 5:50
- US 12-inch single
1. "All Around the World" (Long Version) – 7:02
2. "All Around the World" (American Club Remix) – 11:48
3. "Affection" – 5:50
- 2006 US digital Dance Vault Mixes
1. "All Around The World" (Single Version) – 4:21
2. "All Around The World" (American Club Edit) – 4:29
3. "All Around The World" (Long Version) – 7:02
4. "All Around The World" (American Club Remix) – 11:48
- Other remixes
1. "All Around the World" (Attack Mix) – 5:00

== Charts ==
=== Weekly charts ===
Chart (1989–1990)	Peak position
Australia (ARIA)	9
Austria (Ö3 Austria Top 40)	1
Belgium (Ultratop 50 Flanders)	1
Canada Retail Singles (The Record)	1
Canada Top Singles (RPM)	3
Canada Adult Contemporary (RPM)	3
Canada Dance/Urban (RPM)	1
Europe (Eurochart Hot 100)	4
Finland (Suomen virallinen lista)	6
France (SNEP)	24
Greece (IFPI)	1
Ireland (IRMA)	3
Italy (Musica e dischi)	2
Italy Airplay (Music & Media)	1
Luxembourg (Radio Luxembourg)	1
Netherlands (Dutch Top 40)	1
Netherlands (Single Top 100)	1
New Zealand (Recorded Music NZ)	10
Norway (VG-lista)	1
Spain (AFYVE)	1
Sweden (Sverigetopplistan)	4
Switzerland (Schweizer Hitparade)	3
UK Singles (Official Charts)	1
US Billboard Hot 100	3
US Adult Contemporary (Billboard)	7
US 12-inch Singles Sales (Billboard)	1
US Dance Club Play (Billboard)	1
US Hot Black Singles (Billboard)	1
US Cash Box Top 100	3
West Germany (GfK)	2
Zimbabwe (ZIMA)	2

Chart (2003)	Peak position
US Dance Club Songs (Billboard)	34

=== Year-end charts ===
Chart (1989)	Position
Europe (Eurochart Hot 100)	82
Norway Christmas Period (VG-lista)	7
UK Singles (OCC)	12

Chart (1990)	Position
Austria (Ö3 Austria Top 40)	20
Belgium (Ultratop 50 Flanders)	38
Canada Top Singles (RPM)	21
Canada Adult Contemporary (RPM)	8
Canada Dance/Urban (RPM)	6
Europe (Eurochart Hot 100)	40
Germany (Media Control)	13
Netherlands (Dutch Top 40)	46
Norway Winter Period (VG-lista)	2
Spain (AFYVE)	16
Switzerland (Schweizer Hitparade)	19
US Billboard Hot 100	21
US 12-inch Singles Sales (Billboard)	5
US Dance Club Play (Billboard)	3
US Hot Black Singles (Billboard)	6
US Cash Box Top 100	24

=== Decade-end charts ===
Chart (1990–1999)	Position
Canada (Nielsen SoundScan)	41

== Certifications and sales ==
Region	Certification	Certified units/sales
Australia (ARIA)	Gold	35,000^{^}
Austria (IFPI Austria)	Gold	25,000^{*}
Germany (BVMI)	Gold	250,000^{^}
Sweden (GLF)	Gold	25,000^{^}
United Kingdom (BPI)	Gold	400,000^{^}
United States (RIAA)	Platinum	1,000,000^{^}
^{*} Sales figures based on certification alone.^{^} Shipments figures based on certification alone.

== See also ==
- List of number-one hits of 1990 (Austria)
- VRT Top 30 number-one hits of 1990
- List of RPM number-one dance singles of 1990
- List of Dutch Top 40 number-one singles of 1990
- VG-lista 1964 to 1994
- List of number-one singles of 1990 (Spain)
- List of UK Singles Chart number ones of the 1980s
- List of number-one dance singles of 1990 (U.S.)
- List of number-one R&B singles of 1990 (U.S.)
