= A Little More Love (Lisa Stansfield song) =

Single by Lisa Stansfield

from the album Real Love
- Released: 30 June 1992
- Recorded: 1991
- Genre: Soul; smooth jazz
- Length: 4:35
- Label: Arista
- Songwriters: Lisa Stansfield; Ian Devaney; Andy Morris
- Producers: Ian Devaney; Andy Morris

Lisa Stansfield singles chronology
"Set Your Loving Free" (1992)	"A Little More Love" (1992)	"Someday (I'm Coming Back)" (1992)

Music video
- "A Little More Love" on YouTube

"A Little More Love" is a song recorded by British singer-songwriter and actress Lisa Stansfield, released in June 1992, by Arista Records, as the fifth single from her second album, Real Love (1991). The song was written by Stansfield, Ian Devaney and Andy Morris, and produced by Devaney and Morris. On 30 June 1992, it was released as a single in the United States and peaked at number thirty on the US Billboard Hot R&B/Hip-Hop Songs chart. The live music video recorded at the Wembley Stadium was also released. "Set Your Loving Free" which was included on the B-side of the single and remixed by Masters at Work, reached number twenty on the Billboard Hot Dance Club Songs chart.

== Critical reception ==
David Taylor-Wilson from Bay Area Reporter complimented the song as an "exciting" number, adding that "clubs will have a field day". Larry Flick from Billboard magazine named it a "soft and rhythmic gem", and a "tasty treat". He remarked that Stansfield is, "as usual", in "mighty fine voice, giving this romantic plea an affecting, dramatic edge without resorting to clichéd acrobatics." Rufer & Fell from the Gavin Report commented, "The lady is making some pretty mature sounding records these days. Count this one among the classiest around." In his album review, Robbert Tilli from Music & Media felt the song comes closest to Marvin Gaye's "Sexual Healing", "when it comes to sensuality". Parry Gettelman from Orlando Sentinel remarked that Stansfield's voice "is sultry yet subtle".

== Track listings ==
- US 7" single/cassette
1. "A Little More Love" (Album Edit) – 4:10
2. "Set Your Loving Free" (Edit) – 4:09
- US 12" single
1. "A Little More Love" (Album Edit) – 4:10
2. "A Little More Love" (Album Version) – 4:34
3. "Set Your Loving Free" (Kenlou 12") – 7:26
4. "Set Your Loving Free" (Dubmaster Edit) – 4:41

== Charts ==
Chart (1992)	Peak position
US Hot R&B/Hip-Hop Songs (Billboard)	30
