= Driza Bone =

International dance music and remixing ensemble

Driza Bone (sometimes Drizabone or Driza-bone) is an international dance music and remixing musical group, led by record producers, musicians, and songwriters Vincent Garcia and Billy April. Driza Bone used various female vocalists to provide the vocals, and were primarily popular in the early 1990s.

== Career ==
The most successful remix single was of American R&B singer Shanice's 1991 single, "I Love Your Smile". The remixed version reached No. 2 on both the U.S. Billboard Hot 100 and the UK Singles Chart.

Production / remixes by Driza Bone include songs by Lisa Stansfield, Jody Watley, Mary J. Blige, Shanice, Duran Duran, Tom Browne, Barry White, Diana Ross, Kylie Minogue, LuLu, Dasha Logan, Lindy Layton.

Driza Bone's most popular track, as an artist, was the song "Real Love", which reached No. 16 on the UK Singles Chart in June 1991. When this record came out, Drizabone included April, Garcia, and singer Sophie Jones. Jones was soon replaced by Dee Heron, who appeared on the single "Catch the Fire" (UK No. 54).

Heron was replaced by Kymberley Peer for "Pressure" (UK No. 33), "Brightest Star" (UK No. 45), and a re-release of "Real Love" in 1995 (UK No. 24, their biggest hit since the original version of the track). Driza Bone also had a charting album in 1994, titled Conspiracy, which debuted and peaked at No. 72 on the UK Albums Chart in November of that year. All of their chart successes were released on the Fourth & Broadway record label.

On 15 July 2025, it was announced that Billy April (latterly known as Billy Freeman) had suddenly died after a short period of illness at the age of 61.

== Discography ==
=== Albums ===
List of albums, with selected chart positions
| Title | Album details | Peak chart positions | |
| Title | Album details | UK | AUS |
|---|---|---|---|
| Conspiracy | Released: 1994; Format: CD | 72 | 156 |

=== Singles ===
| Year | Title | Peak chart positions | | | |
| Year | Title | UK | UK R&B | UK Dance | AUS |
|---|---|---|---|---|---|
| 1991 | "Real Love" | 16 | ― | ― | 180 |
| 1991 | "Catch the Fire" | 54 | ― | ― | ― |
| 1994 | "Pressure" | 33 | ― | ― | ― |
| 1994 | "Brightest Star" | 45 | 7 | 9 | ― |
| 1995 | "Real Love" (re-release) | 24 | 3 | 7 | ― |
"—" denotes releases that did not chart.
