= Live in Manchester (Lisa Stansfield album) =

2015 live album by Lisa Stansfield

Live album by Lisa Stansfield
- Released: 28 August 2015
- Recorded: 7 September 2014
- Venue: Bridgewater Hall (Manchester)
- Length: 97:50
- Label: earMUSIC

Lisa Stansfield chronology
The Collection 1989–2003 (2014)	Live in Manchester (2015)	Deeper (2018)

Lisa Stansfield video chronology
Live at Ronnie Scott's (2005)	Live in Manchester (2015)

Live in Manchester is a live album/home video by the English singer Lisa Stansfield, released on 28 August 2015.

== Background and content ==
After a long absence from the music industry, Stansfield returned in 2014 with her studio album Seven, followed by a sold-out European Seven Tour. Recorded in Stansfield's hometown Manchester at Bridgewater Hall on 7 September 2014 during the tour, Live in Manchester presents Stansfield performing her greatest hits like "All Around the World" and tracks from her latest album Seven. Filmed by Tim Sidwell and mastered at Abbey Road Studios, Live in Manchester was released on 2CD, DVD and Blu-ray on 28 August 2015 on earMUSIC. The bonus material is an over 25 minutes long interview with Stansfield in which she talks about Seven.

== Track listing ==
Disc one – CD
No.	Title	Writer(s)	From Album	Length
1.	"Can't Dance"	Lisa Stansfield; Ian Devaney	Seven	4:52
2.	"Set Your Loving Free"	Stansfield; Devaney; Andy Morris	Real Love	3:52
3.	"The Real Thing"	Stansfield; Devaney	Lisa Stansfield	3:56
4.	"Stupid Heart"	Stansfield	Seven	4:02
5.	"Never, Never Gonna Give You Up"	Barry White	Lisa Stansfield	5:51
6.	"8-3-1"	Stansfield; Devaney; Richard Darbyshire; Charlotte Kelly	Face Up	3:49
7.	"Make Love to Ya"	Stansfield; Devaney; Morris	Real Love	4:30
8.	"Change"	Stansfield; Devaney; Morris	Real Love	5:28
9.	"The Rain"	Stansfield; Devaney	Seven	4:03
10.	"Time to Make You Mine"	Stansfield; Devaney; Morris	Real Love	4:37
11.	"Picket Fence"	Stansfield; Devaney	Seven	3:55

Disc two – CD
No.	Title	Writer(s)	From Album	Length
1.	"What Did I Do to You?"	Stansfield; Devaney; Morris	Affection	2:32
2.	"People Hold On"	Stansfield; Matt Black; Jonathan More	What's That Noise?	3:07
3.	"Someday (I'm Coming Back)"	Stansfield; Devaney; Morris	The Bodyguard (soundtrack)	4:21
4.	"Conversation"	Stansfield	Seven	5:05
5.	"It's Got to Be Real"	Stansfield; Devaney; Morris	Real Love	5:25
6.	"Live Together"	Stansfield; Devaney; Morris	Affection	4:19
7.	"So Be It"	Stansfield; Devaney	Seven	4:31
8.	"There Goes My Heart"	Stansfield; Devaney	Seven	4:22
9.	"Carry On"	Stansfield; Devaney	Seven	4:53
10.	"Love Can"	Stansfield; Devaney	Seven	5:05
11.	"All Around the World"	Stansfield; Devaney; Morris	Affection	5:15

DVD/Blu-ray
No.	Title	Writer(s)	Length
1.	"Can't Dance"	Stansfield; Devaney
2.	"Set Your Loving Free"	Stansfield; Devaney; Morris
3.	"The Real Thing"	Stansfield; Devaney
4.	"Stupid Heart"	Stansfield
5.	"Never, Never Gonna Give You Up"	White
6.	"8-3-1"	Stansfield; Devaney; Darbyshire; Kelly
7.	"Make Love to Ya"	Stansfield; Devaney; Morris
8.	"Change"	Stansfield; Devaney; Morris
9.	"The Rain"	Stansfield; Devaney
10.	"Time to Make You Mine"	Stansfield; Devaney; Morris
11.	"Picket Fence"	Stansfield; Devaney
12.	"What Did I Do to You?"	Stansfield; Devaney; Morris
13.	"People Hold On"	Stansfield; Black; More
14.	"Someday (I'm Coming Back)"	Stansfield; Devaney; Morris
15.	"Conversation"	Stansfield
16.	"It's Got to Be Real"	Stansfield; Devaney; Morris
17.	"Live Together"	Stansfield; Devaney; Morris
18.	"So Be It"	Stansfield; Devaney
19.	"There Goes My Heart"	Stansfield; Devaney
20.	"Carry On"	Stansfield; Devaney
21.	"Love Can"	Stansfield; Devaney
22.	"All Around the World"	Stansfield; Devaney; Morris
23.	"Lisa Stansfield Talks Seven – Interview"		25:00

== Charts ==
Chart (2015)	Peak position
Italian Music DVD (FIMI)	18
