= Seven Tour =

2013–14 concert tour by Lisa Stansfield

- European tour by Lisa Stansfield
- Promotional poster for the concert in Poland
- Associated album: Seven
- Start date: 16 May 2013
- End date: 4 November 2014
- Legs: 5
- No. of shows: 61 in Europe; 61 total

Lisa Stansfield concert chronology
- The Moment Tour (2004–06); Seven Tour (2013–14); Deeper Tour (2018)

Seven Tour is a concert tour by British singer Lisa Stansfield, in support of her 2014 album Seven. During the tour Stansfield performed her hit songs along the new tracks from her latest album, including "Can't Dance," "Stupid Heart," "Conversation" and others. The tour started on 16 May 2013 in Paris, France, and ended on 4 November 2014 in Riga, Latvia. Stansfield played over 60 concerts in Europe. The show at the Bridgewater Hall in Manchester on 7 September 2014 was recorded for a forthcoming live DVD due for release on 25 August 2015. It is titled Live in Manchester.

== Set list ==
2013
1. "Can't Dance" Intro
2. "Set Your Loving Free"
3. "Mighty Love"
4. "Never, Never Gonna Give You Up"
5. "Stupid Heart"
6. "The Real Thing"
7. "Big Thing"
8. "Time to Make You Mine"
9. "Make Love to Ya"
10. "Change"
11. "All Woman"
12. "What Did I Do to You?"
13. "People Hold On"
14. "Someday (I'm Coming Back)"
15. "Conversation"
16. "Live Together"
17. "Can't Dance"
18. "All Around the World"
19. "Down in the Depths"
2014
1. "Can't Dance"
2. "Set Your Loving Free"
3. "The Real Thing"
4. "Stupid Heart"
5. "Never, Never Gonna Give You Up"
6. "So Be It"
7. "8-3-1"
8. "Make Love to Ya"
9. "Change"
10. "There Goes My Heart"
11. "Time to Make You Mine"
12. "Picket Fence"
13. "What Did I Do to You?"
14. "People Hold On"
15. "Someday (I'm Coming Back)"
16. "Conversation"
17. "Carry On"
18. "All Around the World"
19. "The Rain"
20. "The Love in Me"
21. "Live Together"

== Tour dates ==
Date	City	Country	Venue
Europe
16 May 2013	Paris	France	Le Divan du Monde
18 May 2013	Amsterdam	Netherlands	North Sea Jazz Club
20 May 2013	Berlin	Germany	Quasimodo
22 May 2013	Frankfurt	Germany	Gibson
23 May 2013	Zürich	Switzerland	Kaufleuten
24 May 2013	Milan	Italy	Magazzini Generali
10 June 2013	York	United Kingdom	Opera House
11 June 2013	Edinburgh	United Kingdom	Queen's Hall
12 June 2013	Newcastle	United Kingdom	Mill Volvo Tyne Theatre
14 June 2013	London	United Kingdom	Hampton Court Palace
15 June 2013	Manchester	United Kingdom	The Lowry Lyric
16 June 2013	Birmingham	United Kingdom	Symphony Hall
21 July 2013	Castel Gandolfo	Italy	Castel Romano Designer Outlet
26 July 2013	Noventa di Piave	Italy	Noventa di Piave Designer Outlet
27 July 2013	Serravalle Scrivia	Italy	Serravalle Designer Outlet
28 July 2013	Barberino di Mugello	Italy	Barberino Designer Outlet
17 September 2013	Moscow	Russia	Hotel Metropol Moscow
18 September 2013	Istanbul	Turkey	Cemil Topuzlu Open-Air Theatre
3 November 2013	Bexhill-on-Sea	United Kingdom	De La Warr Pavilion
4 November 2013	Bournemouth	United Kingdom	Pavilion Theatre
5 November 2013	Manchester	United Kingdom	Bridgewater Hall
7 November 2013	Bristol	United Kingdom	Colston Hall
8 November 2013	London	United Kingdom	IndigO2
3 May 2014	London	United Kingdom	G-A-Y
8 May 2014	Zürich	Switzerland	Volkshaus
9 May 2014	Frankfurt	Germany	Frankfurt Palais
10 May 2014	Hamburg	Germany	CCH2
12 May 2014	Bremen	Germany	Musical Theater
14 May 2014	Amsterdam	Netherlands	Melkweg
16 May 2014	Paris	France	Le Trianon
17 May 2014	Antwerp	Belgium	Arenberg
19 May 2014	Cologne	Germany	Theater Am Tanzbrunnen
20 May 2014	Munich	Germany	Circus Krone
22 May 2014	Stuttgart	Germany	Hegelsaal
23 May 2014	Mannheim	Germany	Rosengarten
24 May 2014	Bispingen	Germany	Baltic Soul Weekender Weissenhuser
26 May 2014	Berlin	Germany	Friedrichstadt-Palast
28 May 2014	Padua	Italy	Granteatro Geox
29 May 2014	Bologna	Italy	Teatro Manzoni
30 May 2014	Vienna	Austria	WUK
1 June 2014	Sofia	Bulgaria	National Palace of Culture
7 June 2014	Andorra la Vella	Andorra	City Square
5 September 2014	Birmingham	United Kingdom	Symphony Hall
6 September 2014	Gateshead	United Kingdom	Sage
7 September 2014	Manchester	United Kingdom	Bridgewater Hall
9 September 2014	Northampton	United Kingdom	Derngate Theatre
10 September 2014	London	United Kingdom	Royal Festival Hall
12 September 2014	York	United Kingdom	Barbican
13 September 2014	Glasgow	United Kingdom	O2 Academy
15 September 2014	Reading	United Kingdom	Hexagon
16 September 2014	Southend-on-Sea	United Kingdom	Cliffs Pavilion
17 September 2014	Guildford	United Kingdom	G Live
23 October 2014	Zwolle	Netherlands	Hedon
24 October 2014	Zoetermeer	Netherlands	Boerderij
26 October 2014	Mondorf-les-Bains	Luxembourg	Casino 2000
27 October 2014	Basel	Switzerland	Event Hall
29 October 2014	Mainz	Germany	Frankfurter Hof
30 October 2014	Essen	Germany	Colosseum Theatre
1 November 2014	Prague	Czech Republic	Lucerna Hall
3 November 2014	Warsaw	Poland	Torwar Hall
4 November 2014	Riga	Latvia	Arena Riga

== Personnel ==
- Tour manager, front of house sound engineer: Walter Jacquiss
- Tour assistant: Cally Harris May 2013
- Tour assistant: Sooze Moyes June 2013 - present
- Stage manager, backline tech: Stephen Curran
- Monitor engineer: Colm Meade

=== Band ===
- Lead vocals: Lisa Stansfield
- Keyboards, musical director: Dave Oliver
- Keyboards, guitar: Ian Devaney
- Trumpet, flugelhorn: John Thirkell
- Sax, flute: Mickey Donnelly
- Percussion: Snowboy
- Drums: Davide Giovannini
- Bass guitar: Davide Mantovani
- Background vocals: Andrea Grant (UK & European dates 2013 & 2014)
- Background vocals: Wendi (Ruby) Rose (Autumn European dates 2014)
- Guitar: Al Cherry (UK dates Nov 2013)
- Guitar: Terry Lewis (UK & European dates May -Nov 2014)
- Background vocals: Lorraine Cato-Price (UK dates 2013 & London show Sept 2014)
