= Living in a Box (disambiguation) =

Living in a Box is an English rock band.

Living in a Box may also refer to:

- Living in a Box (album), their first album released in 1987
- "Living in a Box" (song), from their album of the same name
