= Seven (Lisa Stansfield album) =

2014 studio album by Lisa Stansfield

Studio album by Lisa Stansfield
- Released: 31 January 2014
- Recorded: 2012–2013
- Genre: R&B; soul; funk; pop
- Length: 57:19
- Label: Monkeynatra; Edel
- Producer: Ian Devaney

Lisa Stansfield chronology
The Moment (2004)	Seven (2014)	People Hold On ... The Remix Anthology (2014)

Alternative cover
- European Seven+ cover

Singles from Seven
- 1. "Can't Dance" Released: 16 October 2013; 2. "Carry On" Released: 14 February 2014; 3. "So Be It" Released: 5 May 2014; 4. "There Goes My Heart" Released: 8 December 2014

Seven is the seventh solo studio album by the British singer Lisa Stansfield, released on 31 January 2014. It was her first new album since The Moment in 2004. Seven was promoted by three singles: "Can't Dance", "Carry On", and "So Be It", and the European 2013–2014 Seven Tour. The album was re-released in October 2014, titled Seven+, with one new song, "There Goes My Heart" and 15 remixes. In the United Kingdom, it was released as a double album with the original track listing. In Europe, Seven+ was issued as a standalone album. The Live in Manchester album/video recorded during the Seven Tour was released on 28 August 2015.

== Background and release ==
After releasing The Moment in 2004, Stansfield focused on acting. She played herself in the comedy series Monkey Trousers in mid-2005. In late 2006, she appeared in the drama series Goldplated, playing Trinny Jamieson. In September 2007, she appeared in another television series, Agatha Christie's Marple. She played Mary Durrant in the episode titled "Ordeal by Innocence". Later, she dubbed one of the characters (Millie, an elf) for the English version of the Finnish animated film Quest for a Heartm released in December 2007. She also recorded the title song "Quest for a Heart" written by Charlie Mole and Lee Hall and produced by Mole in collaboration with Ali Thomson. In 2007, Stansfield joined the cast of The Edge of Love directed by John Maybury. The film starred Keira Knightley, Sienna Miller, Cillian Murphy and Matthew Rhys and waspremiered in June 2008. Stansfield played the role of Ruth Williams. In mid-2009, she starred in the Nick Mead-directed documentary Dean Street Shuffle, playing herself. In 2012, Elaine Constantine gave her a role in Northern Soul, an independent docu-drama about the social phenomenon and generation of this music and dance movement. It was released in October 2014.

Stansfield's career has spanned over three decades, with sales of over twenty million records and a string of international top ten hits including "All Around the World", "Change", "All Woman" and "Someday (I'm Coming Back)". The Grammy-nominated, multi BRIT, Ivor Novello and Silver Clef Award winner returned to the studio in 2012 to record her next album with her long-time songwriting partner and husband Ian Devaney. She also embarked on the Seven Tour in May 2013 and ended it in November 2014. In August 2013, she announced that her seventh studio album, titled simply Seven, would be released in October 2013. However, on 16 October 2013, she announced on her Facebook page that the release date had been pushed back to early 2014. Seven was released on 31 January 2014 in Europe and 10 February 2014 in the United Kingdom. In October 2014, the album was re-released with new material as Seven+.

== Content ==
Seven was produced and written in the United Kingdom by Stansfield and Devaney and includes tracks such as "Can't Dance", "The Rain", "Stupid Heart", "Conversation", "The Crown", "So Be It" and "Picket Fence". Recorded in both Los Angeles and Manchester, Stansfield collaborated with John Robinson and orchestrator Jerry Hey, both integral to the creation of Michael Jackson's Off the Wall, Thriller and Bad, who have worked with Stansfield for over two decades. Following her critically acclaimed return to live performance in 2013 – The Times wrote that Stansfield "still has the most distinctive and sensuous voice in soul pop" - Seven marked her return to the international stage and confirmsed her status as one of the UK's premier recording artists. The deluxe edition contains live versions of her previous hits, recorded during her show at the Sound Control in Manchester on 20 November 2012, and also a new version of "You Can't Deny It" remixed by Devaney.

In October 2014, the album was re-released as Seven+. In the UK, it was issued on 20 October 2014 as a two-disc edition with original track listing plus one new song, "There Goes My Heart" and fifteen remixes. In Europe, Seven+ was released as a single disc with "There Goes My Heart" and fifteen remixes on 31 October 2014. The songs were remixed by Cahill, Moto Blanco, Snowboy, Andy Lewis, Opolopo, Cool Million and Soul Talk.

== Critical reception ==
Seven received favourable reviews. TheGayUK's Chris Jones wrote, "Finally, after 10 long years, she's back - but by god, it was worth the wait. Seven, Lisa's seventh album, gives us 10 tracks that make you cry, make you dance and make you glad you have ears!" Stephen Unwin in The Daily Express wrote, "And after a hiatus of almost 10 years, Lisa is back. Late 2012 saw her dipping her toes in with a few sell-out, intimate UK gigs, just to let everyone know that the voice is still spine-tingling, and to showcase a few tracks from this comeback album which are more-ishly good."

== Commercial performance ==
Seven entered the charts in mid-February 2014 at number 13 in the United Kingdom and Germany, number 25 in Austria, number 32 in Czech Republic and number 42 in Switzerland. In the UK, Seven surpassed Stansfield's previous releases Face Up (number 38, 2001) and The Moment (number 57, 2004) at number 13 with sales of 5,930 sales. All of her first four studio albums made the top ten in the UK, including Lisa Stansfield (1997), which peaked at number two. In 2014, it was awarded a double silver certification from the Independent Music Companies Association, which indicated sales of 60,000 copies throughout Europe.

== Track listing ==
All tracks are written by Lisa Stansfield and Ian Devaney, except "Stupid Heart" and "Conversation" by Stansfield. Older songs from the deluxe edition are written by Stansfield, Devaney, and Andy Morris.

Standard edition
No.	Title	Producer(s)	Length
1.	"Can't Dance"	Devaney; Jerry Hey^{[a]}	4:14
2.	"Why"	Devaney; Hey^{[a]}	3:08
3.	"So Be It"	Devaney	4:07
4.	"Stupid Heart"	Devaney	3:51
5.	"The Crown"	Devaney; Peter Mokran^{[a]}	3:39
6.	"Picket Fence"	Devaney; Hey^{[a]}	3:57
7.	"The Rain"	Devaney; Hey^{[a]}	3:53
8.	"Conversation"	Devaney	4:22
9.	"Carry On"	Devaney; Snowboy^{[a]}	4:07
10.	"Love Can"	Devaney	3:42

Deluxe edition
No.	Title	Producer(s)	Length
11.	"You Can't Deny It" (24/7)	Devaney	4:22
12.	"Set Your Loving Free" (live in Manchester)	Devaney	4:03
13.	"Time to Make You Mine" (live in Manchester)	Devaney	4:56
14.	"Someday (I'm Coming Back)" (live in Manchester)	Devaney	4:45

Seven+ edition bonus disc
No.	Title	Producer(s)	Length
1.	"There Goes My Heart"	Devaney	4:16
2.	"Can't Dance" (Cool Million 83 mix)	Devaney; Hey^{[a]}	5:23
3.	"So Be It" (SoulTalk remix)	Devaney	4:11
4.	"There Goes My Heart" (Cool Million Goldchain + Moustarche remix)	Devaney	4:17
5.	"Carry On" (Andy Lewis remix)	Devaney; Snowboy^{[a]}	3:49
6.	"Can't Dance" (Snowboy vintage funk remix)	Devaney; Hey^{[a]}	5:32
7.	"Picket Fence" (Opolopo mix)	Devaney; Hey^{[a]}	5:56
8.	"Love Can" (Snowboy remix)	Devaney	8:36
9.	"You Can't Deny It" (24/7)	Devaney	4:22
10.	"The Crown" (Cool Million remix)	Devaney; Mokran^{[a]}	4:11
11.	"There Goes My Heart" (Artful Dodger remix)	Devaney	6:01
12.	"Can't Dance" (Moto Blanco edit)	Devaney; Hey^{[a]}	3:30
13.	"So Be It" (Cahill remix)	Devaney	6:09
14.	"There Goes My Heart" (Cool Million remix)	Devaney	4:40
15.	"Can't Dance" (Cool Million 81 xtended mix)	Devaney; Hey^{[a]}	6:15
16.	"Can't Dance" (Snowboy club remix)	Devaney; Hey^{[a]}	4:48

=== Notes ===
- ^{^a} signifies a co-producer
- The UK edition of Seven+ includes "There Goes My Heart" as the last track on disc one and 15 remixes on disc two.
- The European physical edition of Seven+ includes a separate disc with "There Goes My Heart" and 14 remixes. The 15th remix, "Can't Dance" (Cool Million 81 Xtended Mix), was added to the digital edition.

== Charts ==
Chart (2014)	Peak position
Austrian Albums (Ö3 Austria)	25
Belgian Albums (Ultratop Flanders)	133
Belgian Albums (Ultratop Wallonia)	111
Czech Albums (ČNS IFPI)	32
French Albums (SNEP)	188
German Albums (Offizielle Top 100)	13
Scottish Albums (OCC)	45
Swiss Albums (Schweizer Hitparade)	42
UK Albums (OCC)	13

== Credits and personnel ==
Musicians

- Lisa Stansfield - lead and background vocals
- Davide Giovannini – drums
- John Robinson - drums
- Kevin Whitehead - drums
- Gary Crocket – bass guitar
- Neil Stubenhaus - bass guitar
- Davide Mantovani - double bass
- Al Cherry – guitar
- Paul Jackson, Jr. - guitars
- Randy Kerber - keyboards, piano, electric piano, clarinet, Hammond
- Ian Devany – piano, keyboards
- Peter Mokran - keyboards, guitar, programming
- Richard Cottle - piano, string arrangements
- Dave Oliver – hammond
- Snowboy – percussion
- Steve Vintner - orchestral percussion
- John Thirkell - trumpets, flugelhorn
- Gary Grant - trumpets
- Dan Fornero - trumpets
- Andy Martin - trombones
- Steve Haltman - trombones
- Mickey Donnelly - saxophones, flute
- Dan Higgins - saxophones
- Andrew Price - violin
- Clare Dixon - violin
- Karen Mainwaring - violin
- Rachel Porteous - violin
- Martin Wellington - viola
- Peter Dixon - cello
- Richard Harwood - cello
- Hugh Webb - harp
- Andrea Grant - backing vocals

Production

- Ian Devaney – producer
- Jerry Hey - co-producer
- Peter Mokran - co-producer, mixing
- Snowboy - co-producer
- Bernie Grundman - mastering
- Martin Rhodes - studio manager
- Philip Holmes - estate manager
- Stephen Boycs-Buckley - recording engineer
- Steve Sykes - recording engineer
- Michael Stern - recording engineer
- Robby Nelson - recording engineer
- Joy Glover - recording engineer
- George Apison - recording engineer
- Cristiano Verardo - recording engineer
- Adam Kelly - assistant engineer
- Jack Langfeld - assistant engineer
- Spencer Guerro - assistant engineer
- Morgan Strotton - assistant engineer
- Isabel Seeliger-Marley - assistant engineer
- Daniele Trevisanello - assistant engineer
- Eric Weaver - assistant engineer
- Eric Eylands - assistant engineer
- Rachel George - artist management

== Release history ==
Region	Date	Label	Format	Catalog
Europe	31 January 2014	Edel	CD	4 029759 090427 (standard); 4 029759 090472 (deluxe)
United Kingdom	10 February 2014	Monkeynatra	CD	5 037300 786155 (standard); 5 037300 786605 (deluxe)
United Kingdom	5 May 2014	Monkeynatra	LP	5 037300 789422
Europe	1 August 2014	Edel	LP	4 029759 096344
United Kingdom	20 October 2014	Monkeynatra	2CD Seven+	5 037300 793092
Europe	31 October 2014	Edel	1CD Seven+	4 029759 099215
