= Face Up (album) =

Studio album by Lisa Stansfield
- Released: 20 June 2001
- Recorded: 2001
- Genres: R&B; soul; funk; disco; dance; pop
- Length: 73:54
- Label: Arista
- Producer: Ian Devaney

Lisa Stansfield chronology
Swing (1999)	Face Up (2001)	Biography: The Greatest Hits (2003)

Alternative cover
- 2003 remastered edition

Singles from Face Up
- 1. "Let's Just Call It Love" Released: 11 June 2001; 2. "8-3-1" Released: 17 September 2001

Face Up is the fifth solo studio album by British singer Lisa Stansfield, released by Arista Records on 20 June 2001. It was her first new studio album since 1997's Lisa Stansfield. Stansfield co-wrote songs for the album with her husband Ian Devaney and Richard Darbyshire. Devaney also produced all the tracks. Face Up garnered favorable reviews from music critics who praised the funky and soul songs and also the adventurous usage of 2-step garage beats in the first single, "Let's Just Call It Love". Face Up was released in Europe and Japan, and performed moderately on the charts reaching top forty in the European countries. Face Up was re-released as a deluxe 2CD + DVD set in the United Kingdom on 10 November 2014 and in Europe on 21 November 2014.

== Background ==
Lisa Stansfield released Face Up in June 2001, four years after her previous studio album, Lisa Stansfield. In the meantime, she starred in the musical comedy Swing (1999) and also recorded ten songs for the Swing: Original Motion Picture Soundtrack. In 1999, Stansfield recorded "The Longer We Make Love", duet with Barry White, included on his album, Staying Power, and in 2000, she recorded "You Keep Me Hangin' On" for the Motown Mania compilation. Face Up was Stansfield's last studio album released by Arista Records.

== Content ==
Face Up was recorded in 2001. "We really enjoyed making that album," Stansfield said. "I was feeling good and I was very positive about everything. And that definitely comes out in the mood of the album". She co-wrote most songs with her husband Ian Devaney and Richard Darbyshire from the band Living in a Box. Devaney also produced the entire album. "You Can Do That" and "When the Last Sun Goes Down" were co-written by Frank Musker, and "8-3-1" and "Can't Wait to" were co-written by Charlotte Kelly. "Boyfriend" was written by Stansfield and Devaney alone. The title track contains a sample from "First Come, First Serve" by Ramon Morris, and "8-3-1" starts off with a classic cinema line from Audrey Hepburn, "Oh I love you."

On Face Up, Stansfield showcases her approach to classic funk and soul music and also tries out the contemporary urban beats of modern R&B. The album was released with thirteen songs in Europe and fourteen in the United Kingdom, including "All over Me." The Japanese edition included two bonus tracks: remix of "Let's Just Call It Love" and "Can't Wait To". In 2003, the album was remastered and re-released as limited edition digipak with "All over Me" and two other bonus songs: "Can't Wait To" and "You Get Me" (from the 1997 single "Don't Cry for Me"). Four songs were performed during Stansfield's concert at Ronnie Scott's Jazz Club which was released on DVD in 2005 titled simply Live at Ronnie Scott's.

Face Up was remastered and expanded, and was re-released as a deluxe 2CD + DVD set in November 2014. It was expanded to feature rare tracks and 12" mixes including 2003 remixes of "All Around the World", plus videos, live footage and a specially recorded interview with Stansfield. The twenty-eight-page booklet features photos, memorabilia, lyrics and brand new sleeve notes. The set was issued in the United Kingdom on 10 November 2014 and in Europe on 21 November 2014. It was also released as a part of The Collection 1989–2003 at the same time. The previously unreleased tracks on the 2014 reissue of Face Up include: "I've Got Something Better" (Trackmasters Remix), and three remixes of "8-3-1" by David Morales (Morales Radio Mix, Morales Alternative Club Mix and Morales Dub). Additionally, People Hold On ... The Remix Anthology features a previously unreleased remix of "Let's Just Call It Love" called the Feel It Mix by Ian Devaney.

== Singles ==
The first single, "Let's Just Call It Love" was issued in Europe on 11 June 2001. It included club remixes and one new track, "More Than Sex". An accompanying music video, directed by Howard Greenhalgh, was also released. "Let's Just Call It Love" peaked at number forty-eight in the United Kingdom. Later, Arista Records created CD singles for "8-3-1" and set the European release date for 17 September 2001. However, the single, which included previously unreleased track "Can't Wait To", was withdrawn at the last minute. In 2003, "Let's Just Call It Love" and "8-3-1" remixed by David Morales were included on Biography: The Greatest Hits.

In the United States, Arista earmarked "I've Got Something Better" as the likely lead single, and commissioned a hip-hop remix from Trackmasters. However, after the modest commercial performance of Face Up elsewhere, these plans were abandoned. This Trackmasters remix of "I've Got Something Better", and other previously unreleased tracks (remixes of "8-3-1" and "Let's Just Call It Love") were included in 2014 on The Collection 1989–2003, Face Up 2CD + DVD set and People Hold On ... The Remix Anthology.

== Critical reception ==
Professional ratings
Review scores
Source	Rating
AllMusic	3/5 stars
MTV Asia	2/5 stars
NME	6/10
Yahoo! Music UK	6/10

Face Up received positive reviews from music critics. According to Jose F. Promis from AllMusic, this album is similar to Lisa Stansfield, except for a few more adventurous tracks. "'Let's Just Call It Love' incorporates the British 2-step garage beats which makes it an unusual but interesting leadoff single. [...] The album's opener, 'I've Got Something Better,' is classic, funky Lisa Stansfield at her best, and the song gets more and more fun with each repeated listening. Other standouts include the Burt Bacharach-ish show-stopping ballad 'How Could You?,' the pleading 'Don't Leave Now I'm in Love,' and the set's most obvious hit, the breezy, disco-laced anthem '8-3-1.' The title track is the album's requisite Barry White tribute, and the album's irresistibly funky closer, 'All Over Me,' is this set's answer to "The Line" from 1997." Promis also praised two ballads: the "gritty" "Didn't I" and the "sensitive and acoustic" "Wish on Me". He also called Face Up a "high-quality set".

According to the Huddersfield Daily Examiner, the album is a "fine mix of uplifting dance, sugar-coated harmonies, strings, brass and songwriting that's as strong as ever. The top track is '8-3-1.'" The newspaper also wrote that "this is Stansfield at her best, who said herself: 'I think it is only fair to put a record out once you have a great collection of songs together, which is exactly what I feel about Face Up.'" Yong Shu Hoong of MTV Asia considered the album a disappointment, noting that while her soulful vocals shone on tracks like "How Could You?" and "I've Got Something Better," much of the material, including "Candy" and "I'm Coming To Get You," was uninspired and failed to match the quality of her earlier hits.

== Commercial performance ==
In Europe, the album reached number nineteen in Switzerland, number twenty-six in Austria, number twenty-nine in Germany and number thirty-seven in Italy. In the United Kingdom "Face Up" peaked at number thirty-eight.

== Track listing ==
No.	Title	Writer(s)	Producer(s)	Length
1.	"I've Got Something Better"	Lisa Stansfield, Ian Devaney, Richard Darbyshire	Devaney	4:25
2.	"Let's Just Call It Love"	Stansfield, Devaney, Darbyshire	Devaney	4:17
3.	"You Can Do That"	Stansfield, Devaney, Darbyshire, Frank Musker	Devaney	4:30
4.	"How Could You?"	Stansfield, Devaney, Darbyshire	Devaney	4:34
5.	"Candy"	Stansfield, Devaney, Darbyshire	Devaney	5:06
6.	"I'm Coming to Get You"	Stansfield, Devaney, Darbyshire	Devaney	3:54
7.	"8-3-1"	Stansfield, Devaney, Darbyshire, Charlotte Kelly	Devaney	4:31
8.	"Wish on Me"	Stansfield, Devaney, Darbyshire	Devaney	4:49
9.	"Boyfriend"	Stansfield, Devaney	Devaney	4:44
10.	"Don't Leave Now I'm in Love"	Stansfield, Devaney, Darbyshire	Devaney	4:17
11.	"Didn't I"	Stansfield, Devaney, Darbyshire	Devaney	4:51
12.	"Face Up"	Stansfield, Devaney, Darbyshire	Devaney	4:52
13.	"When the Last Sun Goes Down"	Stansfield, Devaney, Darbyshire, Musker	Devaney	3:57

UK bonus track
No.	Title	Writer(s)	Producer(s)	Length
14.	"All over Me"	Stansfield, Devaney, Darbyshire	Devaney	5:09

Japanese bonus tracks
No.	Title	Writer(s)	Producer(s)	Length
14.	"Let's Just Call It Love" (Dreemhouse Mix - Full Extended Version)	Stansfield, Devaney, Darbyshire	Devaney	4:36
15.	"Can't Wait To"	Stansfield, Devaney, Darbyshire, Kelly	Devaney	4:27

2003 remastered edition bonus tracks
No.	Title	Writer(s)	Producer(s)	Length
14.	"All over Me"	Stansfield, Devaney, Darbyshire	Devaney	5:09
15.	"Can't Wait To"	Stansfield, Devaney, Darbyshire, Kelly	Devaney	4:27
16.	"You Get Me"	Stansfield, Devaney, Darbyshire	Devaney	5:37

2014 expanded 2CD + DVD set (disc one - CD)
No.	Title	Writer(s)	Producer(s)	Length
1.	"I've Got Something Better"	Stansfield, Devaney, Darbyshire	Devaney	4:25
2.	"Let's Just Call It Love"	Stansfield, Devaney, Darbyshire	Devaney	4:17
3.	"You Can Do That"	Stansfield, Devaney, Darbyshire, Musker	Devaney	4:30
4.	"How Could You?"	Stansfield, Devaney, Darbyshire	Devaney	4:34
5.	"Candy"	Stansfield, Devaney, Darbyshire	Devaney	5:06
6.	"I'm Coming to Get You"	Stansfield, Devaney, Darbyshire	Devaney	3:54
7.	"8-3-1"	Stansfield, Devaney, Darbyshire, Kelly	Devaney	4:31
8.	"Wish on Me"	Stansfield, Devaney, Darbyshire	Devaney	4:49
9.	"Boyfriend"	Stansfield, Devaney	Devaney	4:44
10.	"Don't Leave Now I'm in Love"	Stansfield, Devaney, Darbyshire	Devaney	4:17
11.	"Didn't I"	Stansfield, Devaney, Darbyshire	Devaney	4:51
12.	"Face Up"	Stansfield, Devaney, Darbyshire	Devaney	4:52
13.	"When the Last Sun Goes Down"	Stansfield, Devaney, Darbyshire, Musker	Devaney	3:57
14.	"All over Me"	Stansfield, Devaney, Darbyshire	Devaney	5:09
15.	"Can't Wait To"	Stansfield, Devaney, Darbyshire, Kelly	Devaney	4:27
16.	"Let's Just Call It Love" (Original Vocal Mix)	Stansfield, Devaney, Darbyshire	Devaney	5:30
17.	"8-3-1" (Ian Devaney Remix)	Stansfield, Devaney, Darbyshire, Kelly	Devaney	6:02

2014 expanded 2CD + DVD set (disc two - CD)
No.	Title	Writer(s)	Producer(s)	Length
1.	"Let's Just Call It Love" (Dreemhouse Full Extended Mix)	Stansfield, Devaney, Darbyshire	Devaney	4:36
2.	"More Than Sex"			5:01
3.	"8-3-1" (Morales Radio Mix)	Stansfield, Devaney, Darbyshire, Kelly	Devaney	3:23
4.	"I've Got Something Better" (Trackmasters Remix)	Stansfield, Devaney, Darbyshire	Devaney	3:54
5.	"All Around the World" (Norty Cotto Remix)	Stansfield, Devaney, Andy Morris	Devaney, Morris	7:33
6.	"Let's Just Call It Love" (Silk Cut Mix)	Stansfield, Devaney, Darbyshire	Devaney	5:37
7.	"8-3-1" (Morales Alternative Club Mix)	Stansfield, Devaney, Darbyshire, Kelly	Devaney	9:34
8.	"All Around the World" (Junior Vasquez Earth Anthem)	Stansfield, Devaney, Morris	Devaney, Morris	10:50
9.	"Let's Just Call It Love" (D.Y.N.K. Vocal)	Stansfield, Devaney, Darbyshire	Devaney	6:12
10.	"8-3-1" (Morales Dub)	Stansfield, Devaney, Darbyshire, Kelly	Devaney	8:12
11.	"All Around the World" (Norty's World Dub)	Stansfield, Devaney, Morris	Devaney, Morris	7:52
12.	"Let's Just Call It Love" (K-Warren Full Vocal)	Stansfield, Devaney, Darbyshire	Devaney	6:13

2014 expanded 2CD + DVD set (disc three - DVD)
No.	Title	Writer(s)	Producer(s)	Length
1.	"Let's Just Call It Love" (Promo Video)	Stansfield, Devaney, Darbyshire	Devaney
2.	"8-3-1" (Live at Ronnie Scott's)	Stansfield, Devaney, Darbyshire, Kelly	Devaney
3.	"The Real Thing" (Live at Ronnie Scott's)	Stansfield, Devaney	Devaney, Peter Mokran
4.	"So Natural" (Live at Ronnie Scott's)	Stansfield, Devaney	Devaney, Stansfield, Bobby Boughton
5.	"Make Love to Ya" (Live at Ronnie Scott's)	Stansfield, Devaney, Morris	Devaney, Morris
6.	"Tenderly" (Live at Ronnie Scott's)	Stansfield, Devaney, Morris	Devaney, Morris
7.	"Someday (I'm Coming Back)" (Live at Ronnie Scott's)	Stansfield, Devaney, Morris	Devaney, Morris
8.	"Don't Explain" (Live at Ronnie Scott's)	Billie Holiday, Arthur Herzog Jr.
9.	"They Can't Take That Away from Me" (Live at Ronnie Scott's)	George Gershwin, Ira Gershwin
10.	"Didn't I" (Live at Ronnie Scott's)	Stansfield, Devaney, Darbyshire	Devaney
11.	"Change" (Live at Ronnie Scott's)	Stansfield, Devaney, Morris	Devaney, Morris
12.	"Live Together" (Live at Ronnie Scott's)	Stansfield, Devaney, Morris	Devaney, Morris
13.	"I've Got Something Better" (Live at Ronnie Scott's)	Stansfield, Devaney, Darbyshire	Devaney
14.	"Face Up" (Live at Ronnie Scott's)	Stansfield, Devaney, Darbyshire	Devaney
15.	"All Woman" (Live at Ronnie Scott's)	Stansfield, Devaney, Morris	Devaney, Morris
16.	"Never, Never Gonna Give You Up" (Live at Ronnie Scott's)	Barry White	Devaney, Mokran
17.	"People Hold On" (Live at Ronnie Scott's)	Stansfield, Matt Black, Jonathan More	Dan Bewick, Matt Frost
18.	"All Around the World" (Live at Ronnie Scott's) (+ q & a)	Stansfield, Devaney, Morris	Devaney, Morris
19.	"2014 Interview with Mark Goodier"

== Personnel ==
Credits taken from AllMusic.

- Richie Buckley - saxophone, horn arrangement
- Brian Byrne - orchestra conductor, string arrangement, piano
- Richard Darbyshire - arranger, guitar, background vocals
- Ian Devaney - producer, arranger, string arrangement, horn arrangement, mix, keyboards, guitar, programming
- Shay Dooher - technical assistant
- Emma Jane Lennon - assistant engineer
- Kieron Lynch - assistant engineer
- Stephen McDonnell - trumpet
- Aidan McGovern - engineer, mix
- Joanne Morris - digipak design
- Eva Mueller - photography
- Carl Ronan - trombone
- Jimmy Smyth - acoustic guitar
- Lisa Stansfield - lead vocals, background vocals, arranger
- Stylorouge - art direction and original package design
- The Irish Film Orchestra - strings
- Caitriona Walsh - orchestral management
- Tim Young - mastering

== Charts ==
Chart (2001)	Peak position
Austrian Albums (Ö3 Austria)	26
European Albums (Top 100)	35
French Albums (SNEP)	102
German Albums (Offizielle Top 100)	29
Italian Albums (FIMI)	37
Japanese Albums (Oricon)	86
Scottish Albums (Official Charts)	74
Swiss Albums (Schweizer Hitparade)	19
UK Albums (Official Charts)	38
UK R&B Albums (Official Charts)	18

== Release history ==
Region	Date	Label	Format	Catalog
Japan	20 June 2001	Arista	CD	BVCA-21087
Europe	25 June 2001	Arista	CD	74321 86632 2
United Kingdom	25 June 2001	Arista	CD	74321 86346 2
United Kingdom	2 June 2003	Arista	Remastered CD	82876 54377 2
Europe	2 August 2004	Arista	Remastered CD	82876 54377 2
United Kingdom	10 November 2014	Edsel	2CD+DVD	EDSG 8057
Europe	21 November 2014	Edsel	2CD+DVD	EDSG 8057
