= Let's Just Call It Love =

Single by Lisa Stansfield

from the album Face Up
- Released: 11 June 2001
- Recorded: 2001
- Genre: UK garage
- Length: 4:17
- Label: Arista
- Songwriters: Lisa Stansfield; Ian Devaney; Richard Darbyshire
- Producer: Ian Devaney

Lisa Stansfield singles chronology
"The Longer We Make Love" (1999)	"Let's Just Call It Love" (2001)	"8-3-1" (2001)

Music video
- "Let's Just Call It Love" on YouTube

"Let's Just Call It Love" is a song recorded by British singer Lisa Stansfield for her 2001 album, Face Up. It was released as the first single in Europe on 11 June 2001. The song, written by Stansfield, Ian Devaney and Richard Darbyshire, and produced by Devaney, received positive reviews from music critics. They praised the track for incorporating the British 2-step garage beats which made it an unusual but interesting and adventurous leadoff single.

An accompanying music video, directed by Howard Greenhalgh, was also released. The CD single included a non-album track, "More Than Sex". "Let's Just Call It Love" was remixed by Dreemhouse, K-Warren, Bass City Rollaz and DYNK. It reached number 44 in Italy and number 48 in the United Kingdom, and was later included on Biography: The Greatest Hits (2003).

In 2014, remixes of "Let's Just Call It Love" were included on the deluxe 2CD + DVD re-release of Face Up. Additional remixes were featured on People Hold On ... The Remix Anthology (2014), including previously unreleased Feel It Mix by Ian Devaney. Remixes of "Let's Just Call It Love" and "More Than Sex" were also released on The Collection 1989–2003 in 2014.

== Track listings ==
UK CD single

1. "Let's Just Call It Love" (edit) – 3:59
2. "More Than Sex" – 5:01

European CD maxi-single

1. "Let's Just Call It Love" (edit) – 3:59
2. "More Than Sex" – 5:01
3. "Let's Just Call It Love" (Dreemhouse radio mix) – 3:35
4. "Let's Just Call It Love" (Silk Cut mix) – 5:38

UK CD maxi-single

1. "Let's Just Call It Love" (edit) – 3:59
2. "Let's Just Call It Love" (Dreemhouse radio mix) – 3:35
3. "More Than Sex" – 5:01

UK 12" single

1. "Let's Just Call It Love" (Dreemhouse remix) – 4:36
2. "Let's Just Call It Love" (K-Warren vocal) – 6:14
3. "Let's Just Call It Love" (Bass City Rollaz dub) - 5:52
4. "Let's Just Call It Love" (DYNK vocal) – 6:12

European/UK promotional CD single

1. "Let's Just Call It Love" (original vocal mix) – 5:32
2. "Let's Just Call It Love" (Silk Cut mix) – 5:38
3. "Let's Just Call It Love" (K Warren full vocal mix) – 6:14
4. "Let's Just Call It Love" (K Warren dub mix) – 6:08
5. "Let's Just Call It Love" (DYNK vocal mix) – 6:12
6. "Let's Just Call It Love" (DYNK Bring Me dub) – 5:55
7. "Let's Just Call It Love" (Bass City Rollaz Rollin' dub) – 5:52
8. "Let's Just Call It Love" (Magic Mix 7" radio edit) – 3:37
9. "Let's Just Call It Love" (Magic Mix full extended mix) – 4:36

Other remixes

1. "Let's Just Call It Love" (Feel It mix) – 7:42

== Charts ==
Chart (2001)	Peak position
Croatia (HRT)	9
Italy (FIMI)	44
Scotland Singles (OCC)	72
Spain Radio (PROMUSICAE)	30
Switzerland (Schweizer Hitparade)	84
UK Singles (OCC)	48
