= Staying Power =

Staying Power may refer to:

== Music ==
- Staying Power (Barry White album), 1999
  - "Staying Power" (Barry White song), 1999 lead single from the album
- Staying Power (The Hollies album) 2006 album by the Hollies
- "Staying Power" (Queen song), 1982
- "Staying Power", a song by Allie X from her 2024 album Girl with No Face
- Stayin' Power, a 1981 single of Neil Young

== Books ==
- Staying Power, a 1999 crime novel by Judith Cutler
- Staying Power: The History of Black People in Britain (1984), a book by Peter Fryer
