= Fandel =

Fandel is a surname. Notable people with the surname include:

- Alojz Fandel (fl. 1974–2001), Slovak footballer and coach
- Herbert Fandel (born 1964), German football referee
- Jean-Pierre Fandel (1927–2019), Luxembourgish footballer
