= Room in Your Heart =

1989 single by Living in a Box

Single by Living in a Box

from the album Gatecrashing
- Released: 4 September 1989
- Recorded: 1989
- Genre: Pop; blue-eyed soul
- Length: 4:28 (album version); 4:40 (single version)
- Songwriters: Albert Hammond; Marcus Vere; Richard Darbyshire
- Producers: Chris Porter; Living in a Box

Living in a Box singles chronology
"Gatecrashing" (1989)	"Room in Your Heart" (1989)	"Different Air" (1989)

Music video
- "Room in Your Heart" on YouTube

"Room in Your Heart" is a song by British band Living in a Box, released as the third single from their 1989 album, Gatecrashing. It rivalled the band's eponymous 1987 single as their highest-charting song. Both peaked at No. 5 on the UK Singles Chart. This song was their most successful single from Gatecrashing.

== Background ==
According to frontman Richard Darbyshire, "Room in Your Heart" gave him a rare opportunity to display his guitar work. Reflecting on his time in the band, Darbyshire mentioned how guitar solos were relatively incompatible with the group's often more dance-oriented material, implying that his guitar parts were often relegated to rhythm/less prominent riffing (and that other guitarists often performed the solos on the few Living in a Box songs that did include them). However, while other guitarists are credited on Gatecrashing (including Brian May performing the solo on "Blow the House Down", the group's first hit from the album), Darbyshire described himself as "quite proud of [his own] solo on 'Room in Your Heart'", indicating that he performed the guitar solo on the latter hit.

== Versions ==
The original version of the song, featured as the final track on the Gatecrashing album, has a length of 4:28.

A slightly remixed single version appends a brief a cappella introduction, delays the start of the drum beat until Darbyshire begins singing the first verse, and features enhanced drum and keyboard sounds intermittently throughout the remainder of the track. These embellishments extend the length of the song by approximately 10–12 seconds. There are also several edited versions of the single (including the video version, which cuts out half of Darbyshire's guitar solo as well as half of the second verse).

== Music video ==
A music video was made to promote the single. The band hired Howard Greenhalgh to direct the video. It was shot in Montepulciano and Siena in Tuscany, Italy.

== Charts ==
=== Weekly charts ===
Chart (1989–1990)	Peak position
Austria (Ö3 Austria Top 40)	27
Belgium (Ultratop 50 Flanders)	20
Europe (Eurochart Hot 100)	21
Ireland (IRMA)	6
Netherlands (Dutch Top 40)	10
Netherlands (Single Top 100)	16
Sweden (Sverigetopplistan)	20
UK Singles (OCC)	5

=== Year-end charts ===
Chart (1989)	Position
UK Singles (OCC)	45

== Certifications ==
Region	Certification	Certified units/sales
United Kingdom (BPI)	Silver	200,000^{^}
^{^} Shipments figures based on certification alone.

== Cover version ==
Streetwize, an international boyband project, sang a cover version of the song during the Irish Childline 2007 charity event.
