= There Goes My Heart =

There Goes My Heart may refer to:

- There Goes My Heart (film), 1938
- "There Goes My Heart" (The Mavericks song), 1994
- "There Goes My Heart" (Lisa Stansfield song), 2014
- There Goes My Heart Again, 1989, a song recorded by American country music artist Holly Dunn
