= 8-3-1 =

Single by Lisa Stansfield

from the album Face Up
- Released: 17 September 2001
- Recorded: 2001
- Genre: R&B; disco; dance-pop; funk
- Length: 4:29
- Label: Arista
- Songwriters: Lisa Stansfield; Ian Devaney; Richard Darbyshire; Charlotte Kelly
- Producer: Ian Devaney

Lisa Stansfield singles chronology
"Let's Just Call It Love" (2001)	"8-3-1" (2001)	"All Around the World" (2003)

"8-3-1" is a song recorded by British singer Lisa Stansfield for her 2001 album, Face Up. It was written by Stansfield, her husband Ian Devaney, Richard Darbyshire from the 80's band Living in a Box and British singer Charlotte. "8-3-1" was produced by Devaney and received favorable reviews from music critics who called it the best track on the album and also the set's most obvious hit, the breezy, disco-laced anthem.

The numbers come from the chorus, which goes: "8 letters, 3 words, 1 meaning," referring to the phrase "I love you" and the song also starts off with a classic cinema line from Audrey Hepburn, "Oh I love you." Arista Records created CD singles for "8-3-1" and set the European release date for 17 September 2001. However, the single which included previously unreleased track "Can't Wait To," was withdrawn at the last minute.

In 2003, "8-3-1" (David Morales Club Mix Long Intro) was included on the 2CD limited European edition of Biography: The Greatest Hits. Stansfield also performed "8-3-1" during her 2002 concert at Ronnie Scott's Jazz Club which was released on DVD, Live at Ronnie Scott's in 2005. In 2014, three previously unreleased remixes by David Morales were included on the deluxe 2CD + DVD re-release of Face Up. Remixes of "8-3-1" and "Can't Wait To" were also released on The Collection 1989–2003 in 2014.

== Track listings ==
UK CD single

1. "8-3-1" (Radio Edit) – 3:29
2. "Can't Wait To" – 4:25
3. "Change" (Live) – 5:38

European CD maxi-single

1. "8-3-1" (Radio Edit) – 3:29
2. "8-3-1" (Album Version) – 4:29
3. "8-3-1" (Ian Devaney Remix) – 6:02
4. "Can't Wait To" – 4:25
5. "Change" (Live) – 5:38

2010 UK 7" single

1. "Eight Three One" – 3:42

Other remixes

1. "8-3-1" (David Morales Club Mix Long Intro) – 8:28
2. "8-3-1" (Morales Alternative Club Mix) – 9:34
3. "8-3-1" (Morales Dub) – 8:12
4. "8-3-1" (Morales Radio Mix) – 3:23
