= Jean-Pierre Fandel =

Luxembourgish footballer (1927–2019)

Personal information
- Date of birth: 4 March 1927
- Date of death: 25 November 2019 (aged 92)
- Place of death: Mondorf-les-Bains, Luxembourg
- Position: Defender

International career
Years	Team	Apps	(Gls)
1955–1958	Luxembourg	6	(0)

Jean-Pierre Fandel (4 March 1927 – 25 November 2019) was a Luxembourgish footballer. He played in six matches for the Luxembourg national football team from 1955 to 1958. Fandel died in Mondorf-les-Bains on 25 November 2019, at the age of 92.
