= Swing (soundtrack) =

Soundtrack album by Lisa Stansfield
- Released: 10 May 1999
- Recorded: Gracieland in Rochdale; Gracieland 2 in Dublin; Metropolis in London
- Genre: Jazz; swing
- Length: 40:21
- Label: BMG Soundtracks
- Producer: Ian Devaney

Lisa Stansfield chronology
| The Remix Album (1998) | Swing (1999) | Face Up (2001) |

Alternative covers
- North American cover

Alternative cover
- 2003 cover

Swing is a soundtrack for the 1999 film of the same name, which stars Lisa Stansfield, who also recorded ten songs for the soundtrack and co-wrote four of them. The album was released in Europe on 10 May 1999 and in North America on 13 July 1999. Swing garnered favorable reviews from music critics who called it a "gem" among the soundtracks. The album, full of jazz and swing songs, reached number six on Billboard's Top Jazz Albums chart. On 2 June 2003, it was remastered and re-released in Europe with an alternative cover art.

== Background ==
In 1999, Stansfield starred in the Nick Mead-directed film Swing with actor Hugo Speer, and recorded cover versions of swing songs and a few original songs written in this style for the soundtrack. The film premiered on 7 May 1999, and the soundtrack was released three days later.

== Content ==
The album contains fifteen jazz and swing songs performed by Stansfield (ten tracks), Georgie Fame (two tracks) and Ian Devaney (three instrumental tracks). Among them, Stansfield co-wrote four new songs: "Gotta Get on This Train", "Why Do We Call It Love", "I Thought That's What You Liked About Me" and "Two Years Too Blue". She has also recorded eight covers: "Ain't What You Do" (from 1939), "Ain't Nobody Here but Us Chickens" (from 1946), "Baby I Need Your Lovin'" (from 1964), "Our Love Is Here to Stay" (from 1938), "Watch the Birdie" (from 1941), "The Best Is Yet to Come" (from 1959), "Blitzkrieg Baby" (from 1940) and "Mack the Knife" (from 1928).

== Critical reception ==
Professional ratings
Review scores
| Source | Rating |
|---|---|
| AllMusic | 2.5/5 stars |

The album received positive reviews from music critics. According to Mark Allan from AllMusic, Swing is a "gem of a soundtrack. [...] The bright, sassy arrangements are fine showcases for Stansfield's confident, take-charge vocals". Allan also said that "[e]ven if the movie stinks, there's the music to remember".

== Commercial reception ==
Swing reached number six on Billboard's Top Jazz Albums and number 165 on the UK Albums Chart.

== Track listing ==
| No. | Title | Writer(s) | Producer(s) | Length |
|---|---|---|---|---|
| 1. | "Ain't What You Do" (Lisa Stansfield) | Sy Oliver, Trummy Young | Ian Devaney | 2:43 |
| 2. | "Ain't Nobody Here but Us Chickens" (Lisa Stansfield) | Alex Kramer, Joan Whitney Kramer | Devaney | 2:42 |
| 3. | "Baby I Need Your Lovin'" (Lisa Stansfield) | Holland–Dozier–Holland | Devaney | 3:38 |
| 4. | "Gotta Get on This Train" (Georgie Fame) | Stansfield, Devaney, Richard Darbyshire | Devaney | 2:04 |
| 5. | "Martin's Theme" (Instrumental) | Devaney | Devaney | 1:24 |
| 6. | "Why Do We Call It Love" (Lisa Stansfield) | Stansfield, Devaney, Darbyshire | Devaney | 4:54 |
| 7. | "Our Love Is Here to Stay" (Lisa Stansfield) | George Gershwin, Ira Gershwin | Devaney | 2:43 |
| 8. | "Love Theme" (Instrumental) | Devaney | Devaney | 1:06 |
| 9. | "I Thought That's What You Liked About Me" (Georgie Fame) | Stansfield, Devaney, Darbyshire | Devaney | 3:54 |
| 10. | "Watch the Birdie" (Lisa Stansfield) | Don Raye, Gene Paul | Devaney | 2:25 |
| 11. | "The Best Is Yet to Come" (Lisa Stansfield) | Cy Coleman, Carolyn Leigh | Devaney | 2:49 |
| 12. | "Martin's Theme (Reprise)" (Instrumental) | Devaney | Devaney | 0:43 |
| 13. | "Blitzkrieg Baby" (Lisa Stansfield) | Fred Fisher, Doris Fisher | Devaney | 2:36 |
| 14. | "Two Years Too Blue" (Lisa Stansfield) | Stansfield, Devaney, Darbyshire, Nick Mead | Devaney | 3:56 |
| 15. | "Mack the Knife" (Lisa Stansfield) | Kurt Weill, Bertolt Brecht, Marc Blitzstein | Devaney | 3:12 |
| Total length: | | | | 40:21 |

== Charts ==
| Chart (1999) | Peak position |
|---|---|
| UK Albums (OCC) | 165 |
| US Billboard Top Jazz Albums | 6 |

== Credits and personnel ==
Credits taken from AllMusic.

- Tim Baxter - assistant engineer
- Vicky Brown - violins, additional arrangements
- Hugh Buckley - guitars
- Richie Buckley - saxophone
- Clarence Clemons - saxophone
- Tony Cousins - mastering
- Jacquie Darbyshire - personal management
- John Thirkell - trumpet
- Snake Davis - saxophone
- Ian Devaney - producer, arranger, keyboards, guitars
- Georgie Fame - vocals
- Geoff Gascoyne - bass
- Rachel George - personal assistant
- Carl Geraghty - saxophone
- Leo Green - saxophone
- Gavin Harrison - drums
- Matt Holland - trumpet
- Tommy Manzi - management
- Stephen McDonnell - trumpet, additional arrangements
- Adrian McGovern - recording, mix engineer
- Nigel Mooney - guitars
- Martin Rhodes - studio management
- Karl Ronan - trombone
- Lisa Stansfield - vocals
- John Wadham - drums
- Kevin Whitehead - drums

== Release history ==
| Region | Date | Label | Format | Catalog |
|---|---|---|---|---|
| Europe | 10 May 1999 | BMG Soundtracks | CD | 74321 66923 2 |
| North America | 13 July 1999 | RCA Victor | CD | 09026 63541 2 |
| Europe | 2 June 2003 | BMG | Remastered CD | 28765 22452 9 |
