= So Be It (Lisa Stansfield song) =

Single by Lisa Stansfield

from the album Seven
- Released: 5 May 2014
- Recorded: 2013
- Genre: Funk; soul; pop
- Length: 4:08
- Label: Monkeynatra; Edel
- Songwriters: Lisa Stansfield; Ian Devaney
- Producer: Ian Devaney

Lisa Stansfield singles chronology
"Carry On" (2014)	"So Be It" (2014)	"There Goes My Heart" (2014)

Music video
- "So Be It" on YouTube

"So Be It" is a song recorded by British singer Lisa Stansfield for her 2014 album, Seven. It was written by Stansfield and her husband Ian Devaney, and produced by Devaney. "So Be It" was announced as the third single on 27 March 2014 and premiered on Terry Wogan's BBC Radio 2 show on 30 March 2014. The music video premiered on 3 May 2014. "So Be It" was set for the release in the United Kingdom on 5 May 2014. The song was remixed by Cahill and Soul Talk (Ernie McKone and Toby Baker). Both remixes were included on the re-release of Seven, titled Seven+. Stansfield performed the song during her Seven Tour. On 24 February 2015, "So Be It" and "There Goes My Heart" were released as a double A-side 7" single in the United Kingdom.

== Track listings ==
Promotional single

1. "So Be It" (Radio Mix)

7" single

1. "So Be It" (SoulTalk Remix) – 4:11
2. "There Goes My Heart" (SoulTalk Remix)

Other remixes

1. "So Be It" (Cahill Club Mix) – 6:09
2. "So Be It" (Cahill Radio Edit) – 3:44

== Credits and personnel ==
- Songwriting – Lisa Stansfield, Ian Devaney
- Production – Ian Devaney
- Mixing – Peter Mokran
- Engineers – Stephen Boyce-Buckley, Jay Glover, Robbie Nelson
- Piano – Ian Devaney
- Hammond – Dave Oliver
- Percussion – Snowboy
- Guitars – Al Cherry
- Drums – Davide Giovannini
- Bass – Gary Crockett
- Trumpets and flugelhorn – John Thirkell
- Saxophones and flute – Mickey Donnelly
- Harp – Hugh Webb
- Background vocals – Andrea Grant, Lisa Stansfield
- Strings – The London Telefilmonic Orchestra
- Horns arrangement – John Thirkell, Ian Devaney
- Strings arrangement and conductor – Richard Cottle

== Release history ==
Country	Date	Format	Label
United Kingdom	5 May 2014	Digital single	Monkeynatra
United Kingdom	24 February 2015	7" single	Monkeynatra
