= Gatecrashing (album) =

Album by Living in a Box

Studio album by Living in a Box
- Released: 26 June 1989
- Recorded: September–November 1988
- Genre: Pop
- Length: 39:11
- Label: Chrysalis
- Producer: Chris Porter; Living in a Box; Dan Hartman; Tom Lord-Alge; Leon Sylvers III

Living in a Box chronology
Living in a Box (1987)	Gatecrashing (1989)

Singles from Gatecrashing
- 1. "Blow the House Down" Released: 6 February 1989; 2. "Gatecrashing" Released: 29 May 1989; 3. "Room in Your Heart" Released: 11 September 1989; 4. "Different Air" Released: 11 December 1989

Professional ratings
Review scores
Source	Rating
AllMusic	3/5 stars

Gatecrashing is the second studio album by British group Living in a Box. It was released on 26 June 1989 and features the UK top ten hits "Blow the House Down" and "Room in Your Heart".

== Overview ==
Two years after the release of their debut album, Living in a Box returned in 1989. In the early part of the year, the lead single, "Blow the House Down" was released. The uptempo track, featuring a solo from Queen guitarist Brian May, became their second UK top ten hit, peaking at No. 10. The planned follow-up, "Gatecrashing" was halted suddenly when the Hillsborough disaster happened in the band's hometown. The single was shelved for a month, and subsequently peaked at a disappointing No. 36. Along with this, came the release of the album. Produced by Tom Lord Alge and Dan Hartman among others, the album peaked at No. 21, four places higher than the band's debut, and was further boosted by the release of the third single. The ballad "Room in Your Heart" became the band's third top ten hit, peaking at No. 5, matching the success of their debut hit. A fourth single "Different Air" failed to make an impact however. The album was recorded at Olympic, Sarm West and Maison Rouge Studios, London between September and November 1988.

Following the release and promotion of the album, the band embarked on the recording of their third album, but after a falling-out with their record company, they decided to part ways and the group split in 1990. The unreleased tracks made it onto lead singer Richard Darbyshire's debut solo album in 1994.

== Critical reception ==
Nick Robinson, reviewer of British music newspaper Music Week, left mainly unfavourable comments on this album. He wrote: "While Richard Darbyshire's soulful vocals excel, the tunes just don't leap out at you."

Classic Pop magazine revisited the album in 2017, giving it a rave review as a forgotten classic from the 1980s. It cited "Unique" and "Room in Your Heart" as standout tracks.

== Track listing ==
No.	Title	Writer(s)	Length
1.	"Unique"	Marcus Vere; Anthony Critchlow	3:38
2.	"Blow the House Down"	Albert Hammond; Vere	4:14
3.	"Day After Tomorrow Night"	Vere; Richard Darbyshire	3:34
4.	"Touch Sensitive"	Vere; Darbyshire	3:40
5.	"All the Difference in the World"	Vere; Darbyshire	4:23
6.	"Gatecrashing"	Vere; Critchlow; Darbyshire	3:09
7.	"Mistaken Identity"	Vere; Darbyshire; Leon Sylvers III; J.Sylvers	3:57
8.	"Live It Up"	Vere; Darbyshire	3:47
9.	"Different Air"	Critchlow; Darbyshire	4:00
10.	"Room in Your Heart"	Vere; Darbyshire; Hammond	4:27

== Personnel ==
- Richard Darbyshire – lead vocals, guitar
- Anthony "Tich" Critchlow – drums
- Marcus Vere – keyboards
- Tim Cansfield – guitar
- Nick Plytas – keyboards
- Will Mowat – keyboards
- Ian Green – bass
- Danny Cummings, Steve Sidelnyk – percussion
- John Thirkell, Pete Beachill, Chris "Snake" Davies – horns
- Lance Ellington, Mae McKenna, Maggie Ryder, Miriam Stockley, Stevie Lange, Tessa Niles – backing vocals
- Brian May – guitar on "Blow the House Down"
- Hugh Burns – guitar on "The Day After Tomorrow Night"
- Chris "Snake" Davis – saxophone on "All the Difference in the World"
- Paul "Wix" Wickens – piano on "Room in Your Heart"
- Jack "Mozambique" Adams – mastering
- Chris Porter – mixer (tracks: 3, 5, 9, 10)
- Tom Lord-Alge – mixer (tracks: 1, 2, 4, 6, 7, 8)
- Chris Porter and Living in a Box – producers (tracks: 5, 10)
- Dan Hartman and Tom Lord-Alge – producers (tracks: 2, 4, 6, 9)
- Leon Sylvers III – producer (tracks: 1, 3, 7, 8)

== Charts and certifications ==
=== Weekly charts ===
Chart (1989)	Peak position
Dutch Albums Chart	79
Swedish Albums Chart	39
UK Albums Chart	21

=== Certifications ===
Region	Certification	Certified units/sales
United Kingdom (BPI)	Gold	100,000^{^}
^{^} Shipments figures based on certification alone.
