= John Grün =

Luxembourgish sportsman (1868 - 1912)

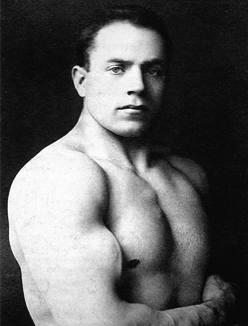
John Grün

John (Johann) Grün, also known as Herkul Grün (27 August 1868 – 3 November 1912), was a Luxembourger believed to be the strongest man in the world at the end of the 19th and beginning of the 20th century.

== Biography ==
Grün, who maintained he was the champion of the world, was born in Mondorf-les-Bains on 27 August 1868 into a family of craftsmen and Yenish Travellers who had long been established in the town. His father was a blacksmith and wandering tinsmith, but John was not keen to follow in his footsteps. He emigrated to the United States in 1889. While working in a St. Louis brewery, he came into contact with Aloysius Marx, a professional athlete, who noticed how easily he moved the beer barrels around. He persuaded him to become part of a strongman partnership called "The Marx Brothers" or "The Two Marks", attracting crowds of enthusiasts wherever they appeared. When Grün returned to Luxembourg in 1892, his status as the strongest man in the world was no longer in doubt.

After his initial association with Marx, then with the Belgian athlete Miss Fanny and finally when he was on his own, Grün appeared in all the circuses, music halls, and variety theatres of America and Europe with ever greater success. Known as the “Luxembourg Hercules”, his acts included tearing apart decks of cards and horse shoes, breaking a block of stone on his chest with a hammer or halting a moving car. While such performances could not be officially measured, Grün never found a better match during his career. To his dying day, no one was able to lift blocks of iron as easily as Grün. The magician Harry Houdini who frequently performed with Grün tells of how "he juggled hundreds, and toyed with thousands, of pounds as a child plays with a rattle".

In 1909, after a serious injury, he gave up his professional career and left America for London where he became the landlord of a public house. Struck by a mortal disease, he returned to Luxembourg in 1912 and died in Ettelbruck on 3 November 1912. He was the first Luxembourg sportsman to demonstrate his abilities abroad. In recognition of his feats, his fellow artists erected a monument to his memory in his native Mondorf-les-Bains.
