= Carry On (Lisa Stansfield song) =

Single by Lisa Stansfield

from the album Seven
- Released: 14 February 2014
- Recorded: 2013
- Genre: Funk; soul; pop
- Length: 4:07
- Label: Monkeynatra; Edel
- Songwriters: Lisa Stansfield; Ian Devaney
- Producers: Ian Devaney; Snowboy

Lisa Stansfield singles chronology
| "Can't Dance" (2013) | "Carry On" (2014) | "So Be It" (2014) |

Music video
- "Carry On" on YouTube

"Carry On" is a song recorded by British singer Lisa Stansfield for her 2014 album, Seven. It was written by Stansfield and her husband Ian Devaney, and produced by Devaney and Snowboy. "Carry On" was announced as the second single on 10 January 2014 and premiered on Ken Bruce's BBC Radio 2 show on 13 January 2014. The music video premiered on 31 January 2014. The digital single was released in Germany on 14 February 2014 and the 7" single in the United Kingdom on 21 April 2014. In October 2014, Andy Lewis Remix of "Carry On" was included on the re-release of Seven, titled Seven+. Stansfield performed the song during her Seven Tour.

== Track listings ==
Promotional single

1. "Carry On" (Radio Mix) – 3:39
2. "Carry On" (Album Version) – 4:07

German digital single

1. "Carry On" (Ash Howes Radio Mix) – 3:39
2. "Carry On" – 4:07

UK 7" single

1. "Carry On" (Andy Lewis Remix) – 3:49
2. "Carry On" (Andy Lewis Instrumental) – 3:49

== Charts ==
| Chart (2014) | Peak position |
|---|---|
| Belgium (Ultratip Bubbling Under Flanders) | 44 |

== Credits and personnel ==
- Songwriting – Lisa Stansfield, Ian Devaney
- Production – Ian Devaney, Snowboy
- Mixing – Peter Mokran
- Engineers – Stephen Boyce-Buckley, Jay Glover, Robbie Nelson
- Piano – Ian Devaney
- Hammond – Dave Oliver
- Percussion – Snowboy
- Guitars – Al Cherry
- Drums – Davide Giovannini
- Bass – Gary Crockett
- Trumpets – John Thirkell
- Saxophones – Mickey Donnelly
- Strings – The London Telefilmonic Orchestra
- Horns arrangement – Ian Devaney, John Thrikell
- Strings arrangement and conductor – Richard Cottle

== Release history ==
| Country | Date | Format | Label |
|---|---|---|---|
| Germany | 14 February 2014 | Digital single | Edel |
| United Kingdom | 21 April 2014 | 7" single | Monkeynatra |
