= Ellange =

Town in the commune of Mondorf-les-Bains in Luxembourg

Coordinates: 49°31′N 6°18′E

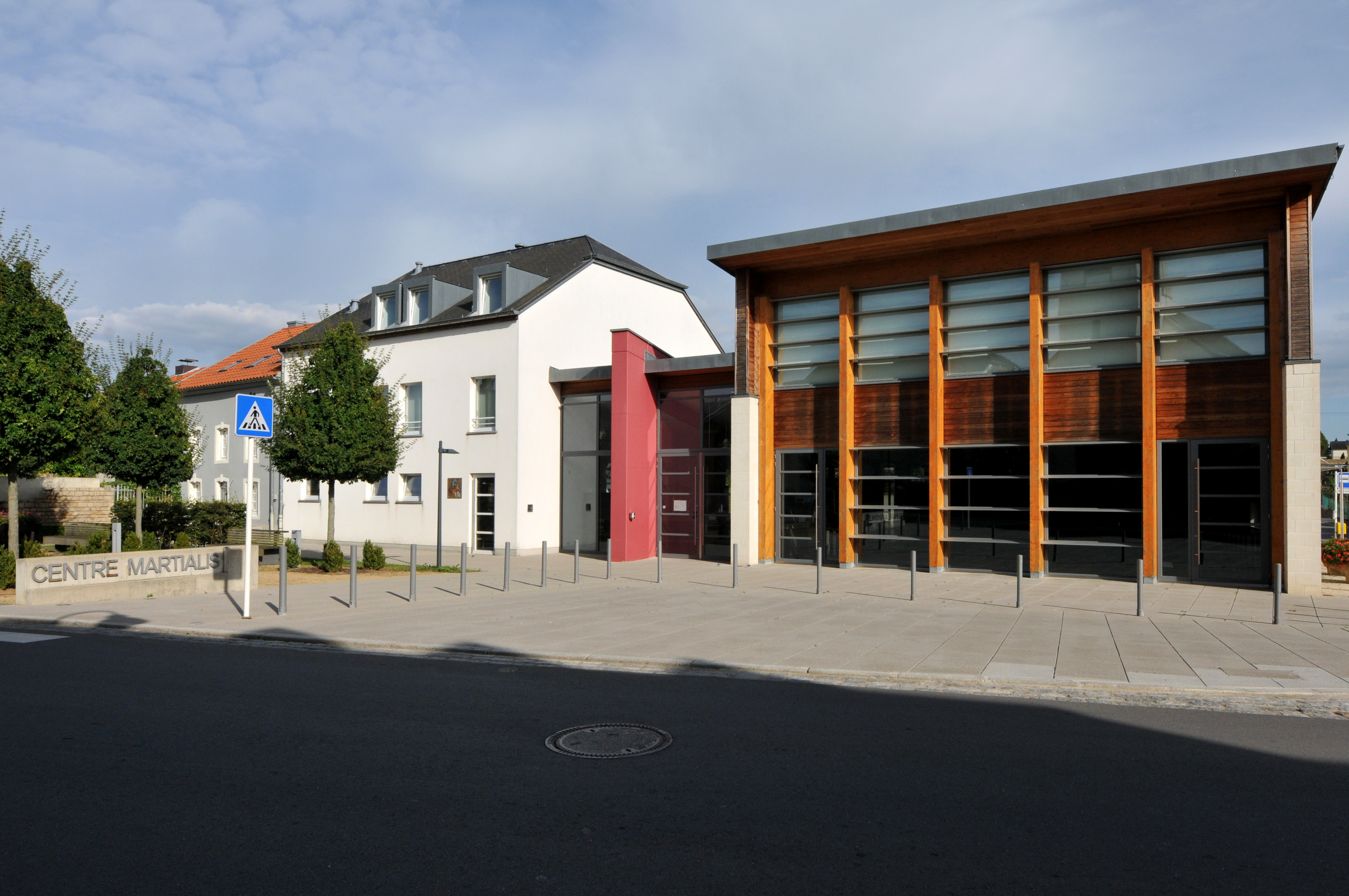
The Martial Center in Ellange

Ellange (French pronunciation: [ɛlɑ̃ʒ]; Luxembourgish: Elleng, German: Ellingen) is a small town in the commune of Mondorf-les-Bains, in south-eastern Luxembourg. As of September 2026, the town has a population of 350.
