= Can't Dance (Lisa Stansfield song) =

Single by Lisa Stansfield

from the album Seven
- Released: 16 October 2013
- Recorded: 2013
- Genre: Funk; soul; pop
- Length: 4:14
- Label: Monkeynatra; Edel
- Songwriters: Lisa Stansfield; Ian Devaney
- Producers: Ian Devaney; Jerry Hey

Lisa Stansfield singles chronology
| "He Touches Me" (2005) | "Can't Dance" (2013) | "Carry On" (2014) |

Music video
- "Can't Dance" (audio) on YouTube

"Can't Dance" is a song recorded by British singer Lisa Stansfield for her 2014 album, Seven. It was written by Stansfield and her husband Ian Devaney, and produced by Devaney and Jerry Hey. "Can't Dance" premiered on Ken Bruce's BBC Radio 2 show on 14 August 2013 and was digitally released as the first single on 16 October 2013. Stansfield performed the song live during her Seven Tour in 2013 and 2014. The remixes of "Can't Dance" premiered on SoundCloud on 22 January 2014. In October 2014, five remixes of "Can't Dance" by Moto Blanco, Snowboy and the Danish/German soul production duo Cool Million, were included on the re-release of Seven titled Seven+.

== Track listings ==
Digital single

1. "Can't Dance" – 4:14

Promotional single

1. "Can't Dance" (Radio Mix) – 3:25
2. "Can't Dance" (Album Version Edit) – 4:16

Promotional single

1. "Can't Dance" (Radio Mix) – 3:41
2. "Can't Dance" (Album Version) – 4:15
3. "Can't Dance" (Moto Blanco Radio Edit) – 3:30
4. "Can't Dance" (Moto Blanco Club Mix) – 6:01
5. "Can't Dance" (Moto Blanco Instrumental) – 6:01
6. "Can't Dance" (Cool Million 81 Radio Edit) – 4:19
7. "Can't Dance" (Cool Million 81 Club Mix) – 6:17
8. "Can't Dance" (Cool Million 83 Remix) – 5:27
9. "Can't Dance" (Snowboy Vintage Funk Radio Edit) – 3:30
10. "Can't Dance" (Snowboy Vintage Funk Club Mix) – 5:32

Other remixes

1. "Can't Dance" (Snowboy Club Remix) – 4:48

== Credits and personnel ==
- Songwriting – Lisa Stansfield, Ian Devaney
- Production – Ian Devaney, Jerry Hey
- Mixing – Peter Mokran
- Engineer – Stephen Boyce-Buckley, Steve Sykes, Cristiano Verado
- Keyboards – Ian Devaney, Peter Mokran
- Percussion – Snowboy
- Guitars – Paul Jackson, Jr.
- Drums – John Robinson
- Bass – Neil Stubenhaus
- Trumpets – Gary Grant, Dan Fornero
- Trombones – Steve Haltman
- Saxophones – Dan Higgins
- Handclaps – Alice Bellasich, Ian Devaney, Mick Donnelly, Davide Givannini, Davide Mantovani, Dave Olivier, Snowboy
- Horns arrangement – Jerry Hey
- Vocals arrangement – Lisa Stansfield
- Additional rhythm arrangement – Snowboy, Dave Olivier

== Release history ==
| Country | Date | Format | Label |
|---|---|---|---|
| United Kingdom | 16 October 2013 | Digital single | Monkeynatra |
