= Live at Ronnie Scott's (Lisa Stansfield video) =

2005 video by Lisa Stansfield

Video by Lisa Stansfield
- Released: 18 July 2005
- Recorded: 31 October 2002
- Venue: Ronnie Scott's Jazz Club (London)
- Genre: Jazz; funk; soul; pop
- Length: 84:12
- Label: Edel AG; Eurotrim Products Limited

Lisa Stansfield chronology
Biography: The Greatest Hits (2003)	Live at Ronnie Scott's (2005)	Live in Manchester (2015)

Live at Ronnie Scott's is a live long-form video by British recording artist Lisa Stansfield. It was released in July and August 2005 in Europe. The DVD captures Stansfield's weeklong sold-out residency at the Ronnie Scott's Jazz Club in London in 2002.

It documents her critically acclaimed performance on the stage that has become home to some of the most famous and talented names in the music business over the past fifty years. Stansfield performed a mix of jazz favourites, along with some of her greatest hits. "That was hard work but I'd like to do more intimate performances like that," Stansfield said. "You're up close and personal to the audience and so it's very real."

== Track listing ==
No.	Title	Writer(s)	Length
1.	"8-3-1"	Lisa Stansfield; Ian Devaney; Richard Darbyshire; Charlotte Kelly
2.	"The Real Thing"	Stansfield; Devaney
3.	"So Natural"	Stansfield; Devaney
4.	"Make Love to Ya"	Stansfield; Devaney; Andy Morris
5.	"Tenderly"	Stansfield; Devaney; Morris
6.	"Someday (I'm Coming Back)"	Stansfield; Devaney; Morris
7.	"Don't Explain"	Billie Holiday; Arthur Herzog Jr.
8.	"They Can't Take That Away from Me"	George Gershwin; Ira Gershwin
9.	"Didn't I"	Stansfield; Devaney; Darbyshire
10.	"Change"	Stansfield; Devaney; Morris
11.	"Live Together"	Stansfield; Devaney; Morris
12.	"I've Got Something Better"	Stansfield; Devaney; Darbyshire
13.	"Face Up"	Stansfield; Devaney; Darbyshire
14.	"All Woman"	Stansfield; Devaney; Morris
15.	"Never, Never Gonna Give You Up"	Barry White
16.	"People Hold On"	Stansfield; Matt Black; Jonathan More
17.	"All Around the World"	Stansfield; Devaney; Morris

Bonus
No.	Title	Length
18.	"Exclusive interview"	19:00

== Release history ==
Region	Date	Label	Format	Catalog
Germany	18 July 2005	Edel AG	DVD	4 029758 642382
United Kingdom	8 August 2005	Eurotrim Products Limited	DVD	5 060061 810975
