= Swing (1999 film) =

1999 film by Nick Mead

- Directed by: Nick Mead
- Screenplay by: Nick Mead
- Story by: Nick Mead; Su Lim
- Produced by: Su Lim; Louise Rosner
- Starring: Hugo Speer; Lisa Stansfield; Tom Bell; Danny McCall; Alexei Sayle; Rita Tushingham; Paul Usher
- Cinematography: Ian Wilson
- Edited by: Norman Buckley
- Music by: Ian Devaney
- Production companies: Tapestry Films; The Kushner-Locke Company
- Distributed by: Swing Venture; Entertainment Film Distributors (UK)
- Release date: 7 May 1999 (UK)
- Running time: 97 minutes
- Country: UK
- Language: English

Swing is a 1999 musical comedy romance film directed by Nick Mead and starring Hugo Speer and Lisa Stansfield. This was Stansfield's film debut and she also recorded the soundtrack, Swing. Jimmy Nail was originally cast, but does not feature in the film. The film was produced by Su Lim and Louise Rosner, with Donald Kushner, Peter Locke, Robert L. Levy, Peter Abrams and Jean-Pierre Guérin as executive producers.

== Plot ==
When an ex-con is released from prison decides to start his own band but he finds out that the girl of his life has got married. Is he going to get her back, and succeed with his band is about to find out.

== Cast ==
- Hugo Speer as Martin 'Marty' Luxford
- Lisa Stansfield as Joan Woodcock
- Paul Usher as Liam Luxford
- Tom Bell as Sid Luxford
- Rita Tushingham as Mags Luxford
- Danny McCall as Andy
- Alexei Sayle as Mighty Mac
- Clarence Clemons as Jack
- Scot Williams as Buddy
- James Hicks as Oi
- Nerys Hughes as Maria
- Tom Georgeson as Uncle Matty
- Dermot Keaney as Arnold
- Jon Huyton as Terry
- Del Henney as Colin
- Richard Buss as Superintendent
- Leo Green as Orangeman / Sax
- David Spence as Orangeman / Trumpet
- Gavin Watson as Orangeman / Piano
- Chris Walker as Screw
- Carl Chase as Dig
- Tim Gallagher as Punter

== Reception ==
AllMovie critic Buzz McClain gave the film a 2 out of 5, calling it "a terrific film, full of life and joy and excellent music, but with an uncharacteristically somber finale". Review aggregator Rotten Tomatoes has the film at 43% based on 7 reviews with an average rating of 4.64/10.
