= The Longer We Make Love =

Single by Barry White featuring Lisa Stansfield and Chaka Khan (B-side)

from the album Staying Power
- Released: July 19, 1999
- Recorded: 1999
- Genre: R&B; soul
- Length: 6:27 (album version) 3:57 (single version)
- Label: Private Music
- Songwriters: Barry White; Aaron Schroeder; Marlon Saunders
- Producers: Barry White; Jack Perry

Barry White singles chronology
"Staying Power" (1999)	"The Longer We Make Love" (1999)	""Let the Music Play" (Remix)" (2000)

Lisa Stansfield singles chronology
"I'm Leavin'" (1998)	"The Longer We Make Love" (1999)	"Let's Just Call It Love" (2001)

Chaka Khan singles chronology
"Come On" (1998)	"The Longer We Make Love" (1999)	"All Good?" (2000)

"The Longer We Make Love" is a song recorded by American singer Barry White for his 1999 album, Staying Power. It was written by White, Aaron Schroeder and Marlon Saunders, and produced by White and Jack Perry. The song was recorded in two versions: as a duet with Lisa Stansfield and as another duet with Chaka Khan. Both are written and recorded in the key of G minor. The song received positive reviews from music critics. The CD single was released in selected European countries on July 19, 1999. "The Longer We Make Love" was also issued as a promotional single in the United States. The song reached #17 on the US Adult R&B charts in early 2000.

== Track listings ==
European CD single

1. "The Longer We Make Love" (Duet with Lisa Stansfield) (Radio Edit) – 3:57
2. "The Longer We Make Love" (Duet with Lisa Stansfield) (Album Version) – 6:26
3. "The Longer We Make Love" (Duet with Chaka Khan) (Radio Edit) – 3:59

US promotional CD single

1. "The Longer We Make Love" (Duet with Lisa Stansfield) (Radio Edit) – 3:55
2. "The Longer We Make Love" (Duet with Chaka Khan) (Radio Edit) – 3:48
3. "The Longer We Make Love" (Duet with Lisa Stansfield) (Album Version) – 6:24
4. "The Longer We Make Love" (Duet with Chaka Khan) (Album Version) – 5:46

== Charts ==
Chart (1999)	Peak position
US Adult R&B Songs (Billboard)	17
