= Casino 2000 =

Coordinates: 49.50752°N 6.28271°E

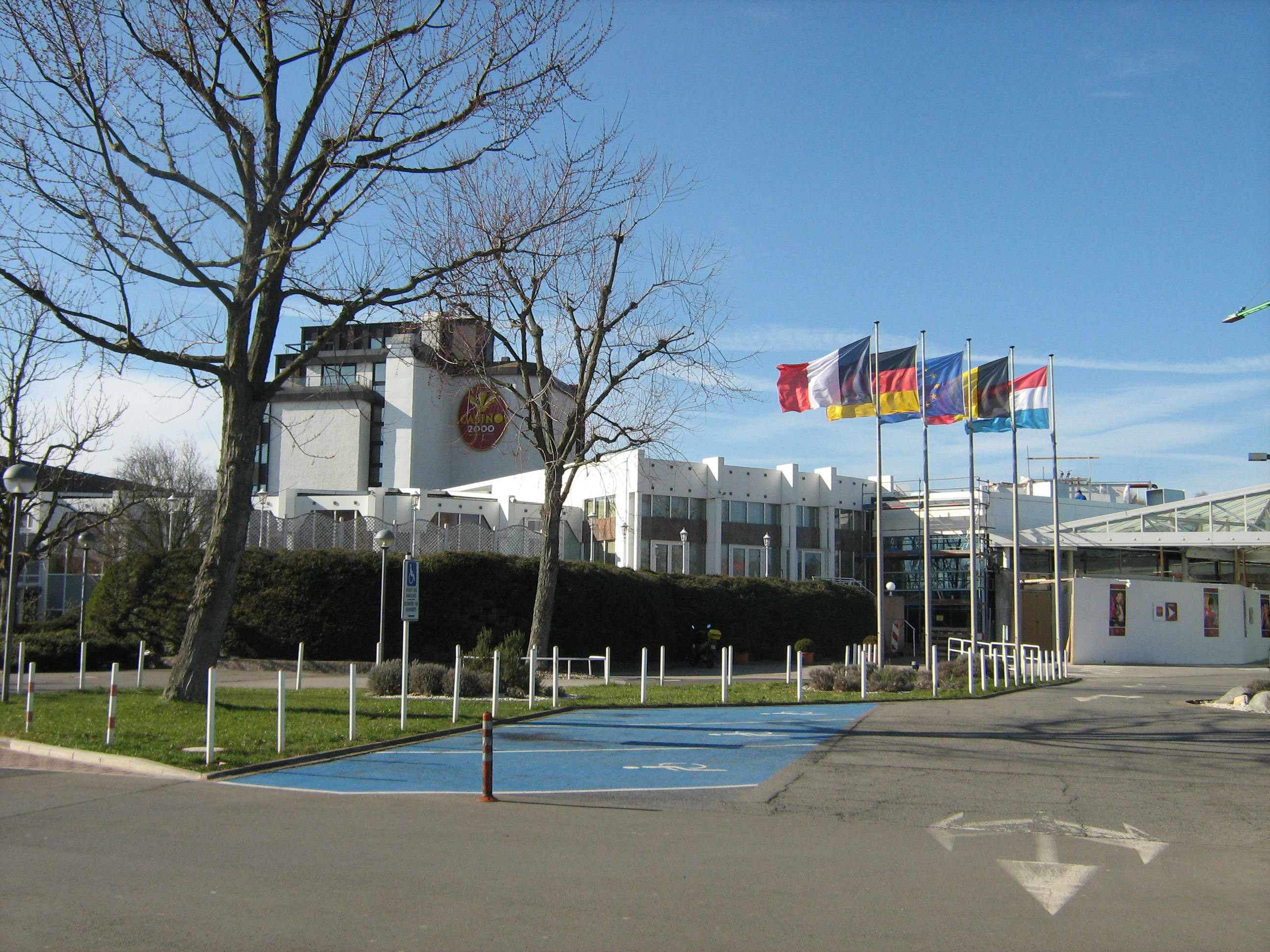
- Casino 2000
- Interactive map of Casino 2000
- Location: Mondorf-les-Bains, Luxembourg
- Opened: April 1983
- Casino type: Land

Casino 2000 is a gaming casino and entertainment complex located in Mondorf-les-Bains in southern Luxembourg. It houses the country's only gambling facilities.

== Facilities ==
Opened in April 1983, the Casino 2000 complex brings together facilities for gambling, dining, accommodation and shows attracting almost half a million visitors a year. In addition to its many slot machines, the casino has roulette and blackjack tables. The frequent shows feature well-known stars and bands. In 2011, responding to the need for additional business facilities, a partitionable hall of 1,325 square metres (14,260 square feet) was built to accommodate meetings, conferences, exhibitions or fairs.

== History ==
Since the 1840s, several unsuccessful attempts were made to obtain permission to open a casino in Mondorf-les-Bains. It was, however, only in 1977 that the Luxembourg parliament approved a bill authorizing gambling in Luxembourg. In September 1977, Mondorf-les-Bains was chosen as the only location in the country where a casino could operate. After the establishment of a company called Casino de jeux du Luxembourg, Mondorf-les-Bains/Luxemburgische Spielbank Bad Mondorf, the cornerstone of the building was laid in May 1982. Costing 350 million Luxembourg francs, the casino was opened at an inauguration ceremony on 16 April 1983.
