= There Goes My Heart (Lisa Stansfield song) =

Single by Lisa Stansfield

from the album Seven+
- Released: 8 December 2014
- Recorded: 2014
- Genre: Soul; pop
- Length: 4:16
- Label: Monkeynatra; Edel
- Songwriters: Lisa Stansfield; Ian Devaney
- Producer: Ian Devaney

Lisa Stansfield singles chronology
"So Be It" (2014)	"There Goes My Heart" (2014)	"Billionaire" (2018)

Music video
- "There Goes My Heart" on YouTube

"There Goes My Heart" is a song recorded by British singer Lisa Stansfield for the re-release of her 2014 album Seven, titled Seven+. It was written by Stansfield and her husband Ian Devaney, and produced by Devaney. "There Goes My Heart" was released as a single to promote the album on 8 December 2014. Seven+ also includes three remixes of "There Goes My Heart." Two of them were created by the Danish/German soul production duo, Cool Million. The music video for "There Goes My Heart" was directed by Ian Devaney and premiered on 22 October 2014. Stansfield performed the song during her Seven Tour in 2014. On 24 February 2015, "There Goes My Heart" and "So Be It" were released as a double A-side 7" single in the United Kingdom. It includes remixes created by Soul Talk (Ernie McKone and Toby Baker).

== Track listings ==
Promotional single

1. "There Goes My Heart" (Ash Howes Radio Mix)

7" single

1. "There Goes My Heart" (SoulTalk Remix)
2. "So Be It" (SoulTalk Remix) – 4:11

Other remixes

1. "There Goes My Heart" (Cool Million Remix) – 4:40
2. "There Goes My Heart" (Cool Million Goldchain + Moustarche Remix) – 4:17
3. "There Goes My Heart" (Artful Dodger Remix) – 6:01

== Credits and personnel ==
- Songwriting – Lisa Stansfield, Ian Devaney
- Production – Ian Devaney
- Mixing – Peter Mokran
- Engineer – Stephen Boyce-Buckley
- Vocals recording – Stephen Boyce-Buckley, Ian Devaney
- Keyboards and programming – Ian Devaney
- Percussion – Snowboy
- Guitar – Ben Barker
- Drums – Kevin Whitehead
- Trumpet and flugelhorn – John Thirkell
- Saxophone and flute – Mickey Donnelly
- Violins – Andrew Price, Clare Dixon, Karen Mainwaring, Rachel Porteous
- Viola – Martin Wallington
- Cello – Peter Dixon
- Horns arrangement – Ian Devaney, John Thirkell

== Release history ==
Country	Date	Format	Label
United Kingdom	8 December 2014	Digital single	Monkeynatra
United Kingdom	24 February 2015	7" single	Monkeynatra
