= Living in a Box (album) =

Studio album by Living in a Box
- Released: 27 April 1987
- Recorded: 1985–1987
- Studio: Galaxy Sound Studios (Los Angeles), Air Studios
- Genre: Sophisti-pop
- Length: 41:59
- Label: Chrysalis
- Producer: Richard James Burgess (all tracks), Tom Lord-Alge (tracks 1 and 7), Living in a Box (track 7)

Living in a Box chronology
Living in a Box (1987)	Gatecrashing (1989)

Singles from Living in a Box
- 1. "Living in a Box" Released: 23 March 1987; 2. "Scales of Justice" Released: 1 June 1987; 3. "So the Story Goes" Released: 14 September 1987; 4. "Love Is The Art" Released: 18 January 1988

Professional ratings
Review scores
Source	Rating
AllMusic	3/5 stars
Number One	4/4 stars

Living in a Box is the debut album from British pop group Living in a Box. It was released on Chrysalis Records on 27 April 1987, and features their biggest U.S. hit, the self-titled single, which reached a peak of number 17 that year.

In the UK, the album peaked at number 25, while the title track reached number 5. A second single, "Scales of Justice" went top 30. A third track, "So the Story Goes," the single version of which featured additional vocals from singer Bobby Womack (though Womack is not featured on the album version), hit number 34 in the U.K., while peaking at 81 in the U.S. The fourth and final single taken from the disc, "Love is the Art" reached number 45. The CD version has the bonus track "Superheroes" (Darbyshire/Vere/Critchlow).

== Track listing ==
Side one
No.	Title	Writer(s)	Length
1.	"Living in a Box"	Steve Piggot, Marcus Vere	3:03
2.	"Love Is the Art"	Anthony Critchlow, Piggot, Vere	3:44
3.	"So the Story Goes"	Richard Darbyshire, Vere	4:19
4.	"From Beginning to End"	Darbyshire, Vere	4:01
5.	"Generate the Wave"	Darbyshire, Vere, Critchlow	4:48

Side two
No.	Title	Writer(s)	Length
6.	"Scales of Justice"	Darbyshire, Vere	4:20
7.	"Going for the Big One"	Vere, Critchlow	3:35
8.	"Human Story"	Piggot, Vere, Critchlow	4:10
9.	"Can't Stop the Wheel"	Vere, Critchlow	5:17
10.	"Living in a Box (Reprise)"	Piggot, Vere	4:10

== Personnel ==
Living in a Box

- Richard Darbyshire - vocals, guitars
- Marcus Vere - keyboards, synthesizers
- Anthony Critchlow - drums, percussion

Additional musicians

- Paul Fox, Richard Gibbs, Rick O'Neil, Steve Piggot, Jon Van Tongeren - keyboards, synthesizers
- Paul Jackson Jr. - guitars
- "Ready" Freddy Washington - bass
- Paulinho da Costa - percussion
- John Thirkell - trumpet
- Paulette McWilliams, Lisa Fischer, Myrne Smith-Schilling - backing vocals
- Tessa Niles, Scarlet von Wollenman, Linda Taylor - backing vocals on "Scales of Justice"

=== Production ===
- Produced By Richard James Burgess
- Engineers: Rob Feaster, Frank Roszak

== Charts ==
Chart (1987)	Peak position
Austrian Albums (Ö3 Austria)	18
German Albums (Offizielle Top 100)	22
Swedish Albums (Sverigetopplistan)	30
Swiss Albums (Schweizer Hitparade)	10
UK Albums (OCC)	25
US Billboard 200	89

== Certifications ==
Region	Certification	Certified units/sales
United Kingdom (BPI)	Gold	100,000^{^}
^{^} Shipments figures based on certification alone.
