= Mondorf-les-Bains =

Mondorf-les-Bains Munneref
- Commune
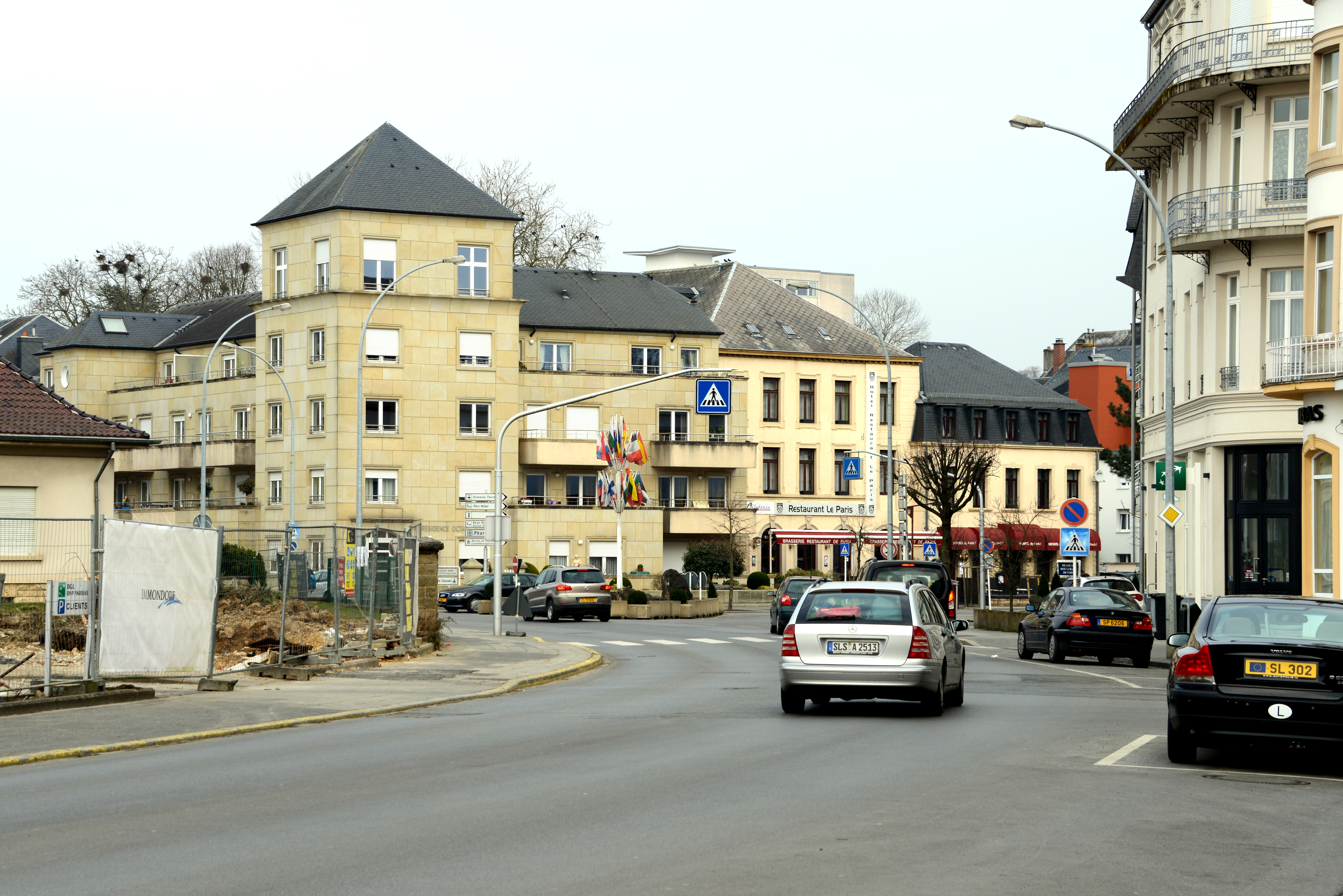

- Coat of arms

- Map of Luxembourg with Mondorf-les-Bains highlighted in orange, and the canton in dark red
- Coordinates: 49.5069°N 6.2806°E
- Country: Luxembourg
- Canton: Remich

Government
  - Mayor: Steve Reckel (DP)

Area
  - Total: 13.66 km^{2} (5.27 sq mi)
  - Rank: 83rd of 100
- Highest elevation: 317 m (1,040 ft)
  - Rank: 95th of 100
- Lowest elevation: 186 m (610 ft)
  - Rank: 18th of 100

Population (2025)
  - Total: 5,432
  - Rank: 30th of 100
  - Density: 397.7/km^{2} (1,030/sq mi)
  - Rank: 22nd of 100
- Time zone: UTC+1 (CET)
  - Summer (DST): UTC+2 (CEST)
- LAU 2: LU0001204
- Website: mondorf-les-bains.lu

Mondorf-les-Bains (French pronunciation: [mɔ̃dɔʁf le bɛ̃]; Luxembourgish: Munneref [ˈmunəʀəf]; German: Bad Mondorf [baːt ˈmoːndɔʁf]) is a commune and town in south-eastern Luxembourg.

It is part of the canton of Remich. Mondorf-les-Bains is a spa town (hence its name), and has the only casino in Luxembourg.

As of 2018, the commune of Mondorf-les-Bains (other towns within the commune include Altwies and Ellange) has a population of 5,082.

== History ==
The area was first inhabited by the Celts. The Romans, who arrived in 65 BC, built the Castel on Celtic foundations to protect the road from Metz to Trier. It was one of Charlemagne's nieces, Muomina, who is behind the village's name. In the 9th century, she donated all her possessions including the little village to Echternach Abbey. The village was subsequently called Muomendorph. Over the centuries, Mondorf was frequently attacked, burnt down and rebuilt. St Michael's Church from 1065 was rebuilt on four occasions, the last time in 1764.

It was in the 1840s that the thermal waters were uncovered as a result of deep drilling for salt which had become highly taxed under the Dutch. Karl Gotthelf Kind, who had found salt in Germany and hoped to do the same in Mondorf, discovered the waters after drilling to a record depth of 736 metres. Despite their mineral properties, the waters were not suitable for salt a brownish colour caused by the rich iron content which emerged after distilling. Nevertheless, the local notary, J.-P. Ledure, saw other opportunities for the waters and was successful in finding support for setting up the "Société des Bains de Mondorf". The architect Charles Eydt was immediately commissioned to build the thermal establishment which was inaugurated on 20 June 1847. As a result of the spa's success, the village prospered as rich French guests came to stay in the luxurious hotels which sprang up in the vicinity. The flow of visitors from France was however halted in 1871 when the Germans occupied Alsace and Lorraine.

Despite acquiring the name of Mondorf-les-Bains on 28 August 1878, the spa had been undergoing a significant decline since 1871. Only after the State took over the facilities on 21 April 1886 were its fortunes improved. Minister of State Paul Eyschen was particularly successful in reviving interest, encouraging visitors to come from Belgium. In the early 20th century, the State invested heavily in the resort adding a pavilion for the original source, a banqueting hall and a reading room as well as the Orangerie and the country's first indoor swimming pool. The park was also enlarged. A railway to Thionville was opened in 1903 and, in 1913, the Marie-Adélaïde Source, named after the grand duchess Marie-Adélaïde was added after drilling to a depth of 464 metres.

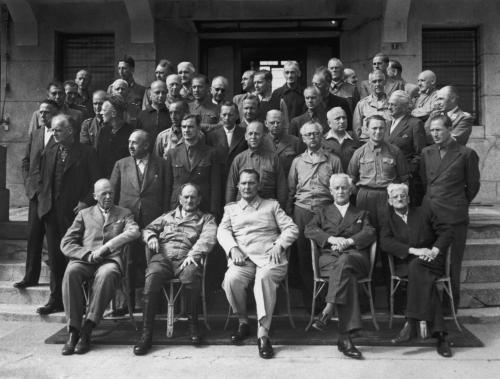
The "Class of 45"; the prisoners of Camp Ashcan. At the center of the bottom row, Hermann Göring.

After a quiet period during the First World War, a new spa centre designed by architect Paul Wigreux was opened in 1926. In the 1930s, the hotels were occupied not by visitors interested in the waters but by émigrés from Nazi Germany. At the same time it was visited by Polish pianist Arthur Rubinstein. During the Second World War, well-to-do Nazis enjoyed relaxing at "Staatsbad-Mondorf", far away from the bombing and fighting. In 1945, Mondorf's Palace Hotel became Camp Ashcan, a prisoner-of-war camp for senior Nazi dignitaries who awaited trials at Nuremberg. During the Allied occupation, that lasted until September 1945, there was no permission to transit in the town from 7 pm to 7 am. The spa continued to prosper in the second half of the 20th century with an outdoor swimming pool (1953), a new thermal centre (1988), and the Casino 2000 which opened in 1983.

== Spa facilities ==
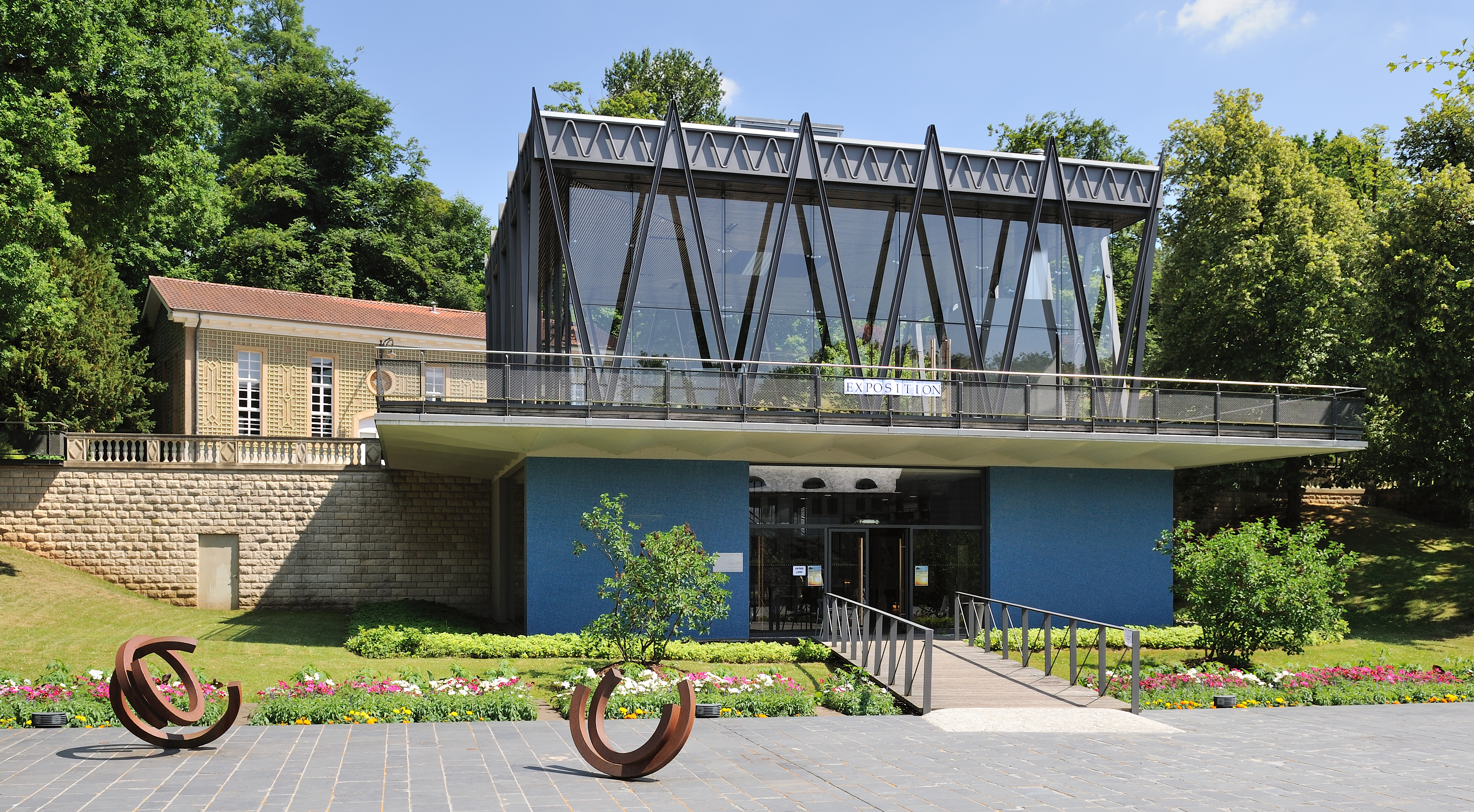
The Kind pavilion in the park

The spa welcomes thousands of visitors a year with its richly mineralized waters at 24 °C (75 °F). It is set in a park of 36 ha (89 acres) and encompasses numerous facilities.

== The church ==
St Michael's Church is one of the country's finest Rococo buildings. Inside the church, the fresco, pieta and pulpit are of special interest. Now a listed building, the church was built from 1764 to 1766 on the initiative of Nic Ungeschick, with the support of the abbey of Echternach. The Louis XV furniture was created by the local sculptor Jean-Pierre Decker who lived and worked in Mondorf. The organ on the balcony with musical emblems, the confessionals and the altars blend harmoniously with the frescos designed by Jean-Georges Weiser from Bohemia. The original St Michael's was built in 1065 but was destroyed and rebuilt on several occasions.

== Population ==
Historical population

Year	Pop.	±%
1821	1,217	—
1851	1,651	+35.7%
1900	1,455	−11.9%
1910	1,482	+1.9%
1922	1,563	+5.5%
1935	1,732	+10.8%

Year	Pop.	±%
1947	1,739	+0.4%
1960	1,757	+1.0%
1970	2,062	+17.4%
1981	2,510	+21.7%
1990	2,821	+12.4%
2000	3,593	+27.4%

Year	Pop.	±%
2005	3,967	+10.4%
2010	4,530	+14.2%
2015	4,651	+2.7%
2020	5,359	+15.2%
2021	5,404	+0.8%

Source data

== Economy ==
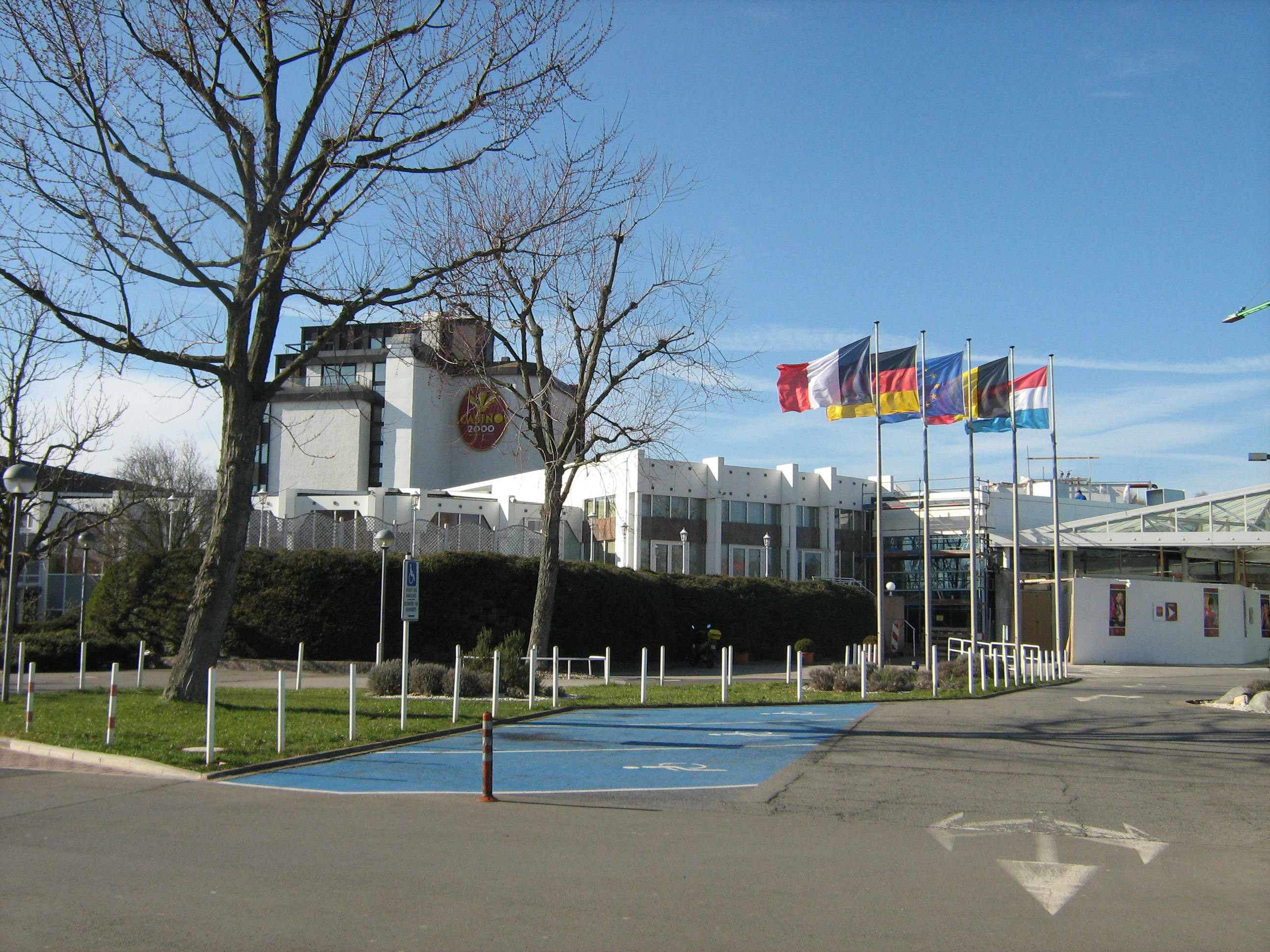
Casino 2000

The major contributor to Mondorf's economy is Casino 2000 as a hotel, restaurant, gaming centre and business venue. Other contributors are the town's restaurants, its tourists, arts and crafts interests as well as agriculture and viticulture. The Domaine Thermal attracts visitors to the spa as well as those interested in its hotel and restaurants and its conference facilities.

== Twin towns ==
Mondorf-les-Bains is twinned with:

- Bad Homburg, Germany
- Cabourg, France
- Chur, Switzerland
- Mayrhofen, Austria
- Terracina, Italy
- Vale de Cambra, Portugal

== Notable people ==
- John Grün (1868–1912), the "strongest man in the world"
- Fränk Schleck (born 1980) professional road racing cyclist
