= Living in a Box (song) =

1987 single by Living in a Box

Single by Living in a Box

from the album Living in a Box
- B-side: "Living in a Box" (The Penthouse mix)
- Released: 23 March 1987
- Genre: Sophisti-pop; soul
- Length: 3:02
- Label: Chrysalis
- Songwriters: Marcus Vere; Steve Piggot; Graham Howarth
- Producers: Richard James Burgess; Tom Lord-Alge

Living in a Box singles chronology
"Living in a Box" (1987)	"Scales of Justice" (1987)

Music video
- "Living in a Box" on YouTube

"Living in a Box" is a song by the British band Living in a Box, released on 23 March 1987 as the lead single from their self-titled first album. Their debut single, it was the group's biggest hit single along with "Room in Your Heart" (1989), reaching No. 5 on the UK Singles Chart. "Living in a Box" became the group's only top-40 hit in the United States, peaking at No. 17 on the Billboard Hot 100. The song was later covered by Bobby Womack; his version reached No. 70 in the UK.

== Background ==
The song's title came from former member Jon Bennett who lived in a small council flat in Sheffield prompting him to remark "I feel like I'm living in a cardboard box.", referring to the sense of feeling enclosed. The music video features British DJ Tony Blackburn holding and moving the mouth of a cardboard cutout of himself over his face.

== Track listings ==
Non-US 7-inch single

A. "Living in a Box" – 3:02
B. "Living in a Box" (The Penthouse mix) – 3:10

Non-US 12-inch single

A. "Living in a Box" (dance mix) – 6:10
AA. "Living in a Box" (The Penthouse mix) – 5:18

UK 12-inch single (The Bootleg mix)

A1. "Living in a Box" (The Bootleg mix) – 6:03
B1. "So the Story Goes" – 3:50
B2. "The Liam McCoy" – 3:01

UK CD single

1. "Living in a Box" (dance mix) – 6:10
2. "Living in a Box" (The Penthouse mix) – 5:18
3. "Superheroes" – 3:57

US and Canadian 7-inch single

A. "Living in a Box" (single version) – 3:02
AA. "Living in a Box" (edited dance mix) – 3:50

US 12-inch single

A1. "Living in a Box" (dance mix) – 6:10
B1. "Living in a Box" (The Penthouse mix) – 5:18
B2. "Living in a Box" (edited dance mix) – 3:50

== Charts ==
=== Weekly charts ===
Weekly chart performance for "Living in a Box"
Chart (1987)	Peak position
Australia (Kent Music Report)	49
Austria (Ö3 Austria Top 40)	11
Belgium (Ultratop 50 Flanders)	20
Canada Top Singles (RPM)	18
Europe (European Hot 100 Singles)	7
France (SNEP)	18
Italy Airplay (Music & Media)	12
Netherlands (Dutch Top 40)	10
Netherlands (Single Top 100)	18
New Zealand (Recorded Music NZ)	31
Norway (VG-lista)	7
Sweden (Sverigetopplistan)	4
Switzerland (Schweizer Hitparade)	2
UK Singles (Official Charts)	5
US Billboard Hot 100	17
US 12-inch Singles Sales (Billboard)	16
US Dance Club Play (Billboard)	6
US Hot Black Singles (Billboard)	74
West Germany (GfK)	4

=== Year-end charts ===
Year-end chart performance for "Living in a Box"
Chart (1987)	Position
Europe (European Hot 100 Singles)	17
Norway Spring Period (VG-lista)	15
Switzerland (Schweizer Hitparade)	12
UK Singles (Gallup)	54
West Germany (Media Control)	31
