= Staying Power (Barry White album) =

Studio album by Barry White
- Released: July 27, 1999
- Studios: Record One, Sherman Oaks, California; Capitol, Hollywood, California; Enterprise, Burbank, California; Compass Point, Nassau, Bahamas
- Genres: R&B, soul
- Length: 67:56
- Label: Private Music/BMG
- Producers: Barry White, Jack Perry

Barry White chronology
The Icon Is Love (1994)	Staying Power (1999)

Singles from Staying Power
- 1. "The Longer We Make Love" Released: July 19, 1999

Professional ratings
Review scores
Source	Rating
AllMusic	link

Staying Power is the twentieth and final studio album by American R&B singer Barry White, released on July 27, 1999. The album was White's first release for five years, and his only recording for the Private Music label, with whom he had signed following a four-album deal with A&M which had culminated in 1994 with the acclaimed The Icon Is Love, his most successful album since the 1970s.

Staying Power features duets with Chaka Khan and Lisa Stansfield. These are the only White tracks with a shared vocal credit, apart from the 1981 duet album Barry and Glodean and the duet with Tina Turner (In Your Wildest Dreams) on her "Wildest Dreams" album 1995 (US version). It also contains covers of War's "Low Rider", and a slowed-down version of Sly and The Family Stone's "Thank You (Falettinme Be Mice Elf Again)" (similar to the version on Sly's There's A Riot Goin' On).

Lead single "Staying Power", although not a significant hit, won White two Grammy Awards in 2000 in the categories Best Male R&B Vocal Performance and Best Traditional R&B Vocal Performance. It reached No. 45 on the Billboard R&B/Hip-Hop singles chart. The song is in the key of B flat minor. It was White's last single to be released during his lifetime.

Staying Power was less successful than The Icon Is Love, peaking at No. 13 on the R&B chart and No. 43 on the pop chart. Similarly, its critical reception was more mixed, the overall opinion tending to the view that while there is little to find fault with, the material and production is less distinguished than had been the case with The Icon Is Love. AllMusic reviewer Stephen Erlewine described Staying Power as "classy and entertaining, but [it] doesn't add to the legacy".

== Track listing ==
1. "Staying Power" (Rory Holmes, Joey Paschal) – 6:10
2. "Don't Play Games" (Barry White, Jack Perry, Steve Guillory) – 7:24
3. "The Longer We Make Love" (White, Aaron Schroeder, Marlon Saunders) – 5:48 (duet with Chaka Khan)
4. "I Get Off on You" (White, Perry, Kashif) – 6:30
5. "Which Way Is Up" (White, Perry, Doug Rasheed) – 5:42
6. "Get Up" (White, Perry) – 6:11
7. "Sometimes" (White) – 6:55
8. "Low Rider" (Howard Scott, Charles Miller, Lee Oskar, Leroy Jordan, Jerry Goldstein, Morris Dickerson, Harold Brown, Sylvester Allen) – 5:17
9. "Thank You (Falettinme Be Mice Elf Again)" (Sylvester Stewart) – 5:46
10. "Slow Your Roll" (White, Perry, Paschal) – 5:46
11. "The Longer We Make Love" (White, Schroeder, Saunders) – 6:27 (duet with Lisa Stansfield)

== Charts ==
Staying Power performance on weekly charts
Chart (1999)	Peak position
Australian Albums (ARIA)	151
Belgian Albums (Ultratop Wallonia)	37
French Albums (SNEP)	65
German Albums (Offizielle Top 100)	60
US Billboard 200	43
US Top R&B/Hip-Hop Albums (Billboard)	13

Staying Power performance on annual charts
Chart (1999)	Position
US Top R&B/Hip-Hop Albums (Billboard)	98

== Singles ==
- "Staying Power" (US R&B No. 45)

== Certifications and sales ==
Certifications for Staying Power
Region	Certification	Certified units/sales
United States (RIAA)	Gold	500,000^{^}
^{^} Shipments figures based on certification alone.
