= Living in a Box =

British pop band

- Origin: Sheffield, England
- Genres: Pop, funk, sophisti-pop
- Years active: 1985–1990, 2016–present
- Label: Chrysalis
- Members: Anthony "Tich" Critchlow; Marcus Vere; Bryan Chambers
- Past members: Richard Darbyshire; Kenny Thomas
- Website: Official website

Living in a Box are a British band founded in 1985. The group's 1987 eponymous debut single reached No. 5 on the UK singles chart and was a top-20 hit in the United States on the Billboard Hot 100. Their 1989 single "Room in Your Heart" also reached No. 5 in the UK.

The group, which formerly included vocalist Richard Darbyshire, currently consists of founding members Anthony "Tich" Critchlow (drums) and Marcus Vere (keyboards, synthesizers) along with new vocalist Bryan Chambers.

== Career ==
=== Formation and split ===
Living in a Box were formed in 1985 in Sheffield. The group named themselves after the first song they had recorded together in the studio. Vere and Critchlow were recording the demo version of the tune in a studio also being visited by Richard Darbyshire, an independent recording artist at the time. Darbyshire was invited to join his two future bandmates in the studio to record vocals for the track, and the three officially became a band.

Released two years later, "Living in a Box" was their most commercially successful single, peaking at No. 5 on the UK Singles Chart and became the band's only single to chart in the Top 40 of the Billboard Hot 100 in the US. The single was featured on the group's self-titled debut album, which also included follow-up singles "Love is the Art", "So the Story Goes", and "Scales of Justice". While "So the Story Goes" was the only one of these additional singles to reach the US Billboard Hot 100, all three songs charted in their home country.

Their follow-up album, Gatecrashing in 1989 proved to be even more successful in the UK, generating two top-10 hits, "Blow the House Down" (which featured Queen's Brian May on guitar) and "Room in Your Heart". The album itself peaked at No. 21. Artistic differences, as well as changes to their record label Chrysalis, caused the band to break up in 1990 before a third album could be released.

=== After Living in a Box ===
Frontman Richard Darbyshire continued his long-standing music career, writing songs for artists such as Lisa Stansfield and briefly enjoying modest success as a solo artist. His solo album, How Many Angels (1994) has been re-released a number of times (beginning in 1999, when it was re-issued under the title of Love Will Provide) accompanied by various new and unreleased tracks.

Anthony "Tich" Critchlow and Marcus Charles Vere temporarily retired from the music industry after the band split. Critchlow runs his own company providing bespoke illumination and lighting installations.

After a brief break, Vere changed direction and produced an award-winning series of educational DVDs called Here Comes A...! for pre-school aged children. The business moved online in early 2017 as Kids Trucks TV. In May 2016, Vere was credited with writing the songs "Viva Love", "Flames of Desire", "Kiss Me Goodbye" and "Ten Below Zero" on the top 5 ABC album Lexicon of Love II.

=== Living in a Box reform ===
In 2016, Living in a Box reformed with British soul singer Kenny Thomas replacing Darbyshire. In summer 2022, they announced via Twitter that they have a new singer, Bryan Chambers. Since they have reformed, the band has appeared at live festival events in the UK such as Let's Rock, Rewind and Flashback.

=== Legacy ===
The song "Living in a Box" was later covered by Bobby Womack, who had also worked with Living in a Box on the single "So the Story Goes". In 2013, the song "Living in a Box" was featured in the video game Grand Theft Auto V. In November 2026 the band’s song “Blow The House Down” was featured on the in-game radio station Vice City FM in the video game Grand Theft Auto VI.

== Personnel ==
Current members

- Anthony "Tich" Critchlow – drums (1985–1990, 2016–present)
- Marcus Charles Vere – keyboards, synthesizers (1985–1990, 2016–present)
- Bryan Chambers – vocals (2022–present)

Past members

- Richard Darbyshire – vocals, guitar (1985–1990; died 2025)
- Kenny Thomas – vocals (2016–2022)

== Discography ==
=== Studio albums ===
Overview of studio albums from Living in a Box
Title	Release	Peak chart positions							Certifications
Title	Release	UK	GER	AUT	NED	SWE	SWI	US	Certifications
Living in a Box	Released: 1987; Label: Chrysalis Records; Formats: CD, cassette, LP	25	22	18	—	30	10	89	BPI: Gold
Gatecrashing	Released: 1989; Label: Chrysalis Records; Formats: CD, cassette, LP	21	—	—	79	39	—	—	BPI: Gold
"—" denotes album that did not chart or was not released.

=== Singles ===
Overview of singles from Living in a Box
Year	Song	Peak chart positions											Certifications	Album
Year	Song	UK	AUS	AUT	BEL (FLA)	CAN	GER	IRE	NLD	SWE	SWI	US	Certifications	Album
1987	"Living in a Box"	5	49	11	20	18	4	6	18	4	2	17		Living in a Box
1987	"Scales of Justice"	30	—	—	—	—	35	27	—	—	—	—		Living in a Box
1987	"So the Story Goes"	34	—	—	—	—	—	—	—	—	—	81		Living in a Box
1988	"Love Is the Art"	45	—	—	—	—	—	—	—	—	—	—		Living in a Box
1989	"Blow the House Down"	10	166	—	12	—	28	12	10	15	26	—		Gatecrashing
1989	"Gatecrashing"	36	—	—	—	—	—	—	—	—	—	—		Gatecrashing
1989	"Room in Your Heart"	5	—	27	20	—	—	6	16	20	—	—	BPI: Silver	Gatecrashing
1989	"Different Air"	57	—	—	—	—	—	—	—	—	—	—		Gatecrashing
"—" denotes releases that did not chart or were not released.
