= Richard Darbyshire =

English singer, songwriter and producer (1960–2025)

Background information
- Born: Richard Simon Darbyshire; 8 March 1959; Stockport, Cheshire, England
- Died: 7 November 2025 (aged 66)
- Education: University of Oxford
- Genres: Pop; funk; sophisti-pop
- Occupations: Singer-songwriter; record producer; songwriting coach
- Instruments: Vocals; guitar; piano
- Years active: 1980–2025
- Labels: Chrysalis; Dome; Warner Chappell Music; EMI; Polygram
- Formerly of: Living in a Box

Richard Simon Darbyshire (8 March 1959 – 7 November 2025) was an English singer, songwriter and record producer. He was lead vocalist and guitarist for the pop band Living in a Box from 1985 to 1990. Darbyshire split with the band before their third studio album was completed.

In 1994, Darbyshire released his debut solo studio album, How Many Angels. He also wrote and produced songs for various artists including Lisa Stansfield, Mike Francis, Mónica Naranjo, Level 42, and Jennifer Rush.

== Early life and education ==
Richard Darbyshire was born in Stockport, Cheshire, England, on 8 March 1959. He went to school in Manchester, where he briefly attended Manchester Grammar School. At the age of 13, he followed his parents to Japan, where he attended an American boarding school.

Darbyshire's interest in a musical career began early; he first took up the clarinet but then switched to guitar. While in Japan, Darbyshire was introduced to the soul music of Marvin Gaye, Al Green, and Curtis Mayfield via the US military station. He joined a band with a group of Americans playing Allman Brothers type of material. Although a major influence of the young Darbyshire was Bread, he took his music in a more soul- and R&B-oriented direction.

Back in England, Darbyshire sat his exams at the Manchester Grammar School and played with various bands of the Northern Music scene, such as Gammer and his Familiars. He also went to the University of Oxford, where he studied English literature.

== Career ==
After university, Darbyshire briefly joined a Manchester band called Zu Zu Sharks, composed of Adam and the Ants bassist Gary Tibbs and Alistair Gordon on keyboards. Their single "Love Tumbles Down" was a number-one hit in Spain, but Darbyshire left the band in 1983, unhappy with their pop sound.

Darbyshire continued writing songs. One of them, "Put Your Foot Down", was recorded by the Temptations for their album Together Again, released in 1987. He also co-wrote songs with singer Tessa Niles in 1985 for her upcoming album (which ultimately went unreleased). He also performed session work for Universal Music Group (UMG).

In 1985, Virgin Records, now part of Capitol Music Group, wanted to sign Darbyshire to a contract, while Chrysalis Records asked him to be the vocalist/guitarist for a fledgling band consisting of drummer Anthony "Tich" Critchlow and keyboardist Marcus Vere. After he sang the vocal on a track the band was working on called "Living in a Box", he chose to sign a five-year contract with the band, who ultimately named themselves after the song, Living in a Box. The band released two albums: Living in a Box (1987) and Gatecrashing (1989). Their eponymous single reached the top 20 in the US.

In 1990, while the band was recording their third full-length album, artistic differences between EMI (who had bought Chrysalis Records) and Darbyshire resulted in the split of the band before the album was completed.

In 1991, he sang "I Love a Lady" with Bandzilla, a big band created and led by composer-arranger Richard Niles (then-husband of Tessa Niles, with whom Darbyshire had previously worked).

His debut solo effort, How Many Angels was released in 1994. Singer Lisa Stansfield co-wrote two of the songs, "This I Swear" and "Tell Him No", and sang backing vocals on the album. How Many Angels also featured songs originally written for Living in a Box's third album, and new songs written by Darbyshire and Frank Musker. The album would be re-released in two different forms: Love Will Provide (1999) and This I Swear (20 tracks special edition) (2009), each including B-sides and new tracks.

Darbyshire then continued to write and produce songs with and for other artists, particularly Lisa Stansfield, but also Mike Francis, Frank Musker, Richard Niles, James Last, Monica Naranjo, Level 42, and Jennifer Rush.

In 2004, Darbyshire won first prize at the USA Songwriting Competition in the R&B category.

== Personal life and death ==
Darbyshire opened several songwriting workshops in London, to give writing lessons to young artists.

Darbyshire died on 7 November 2025, at the age of 66. He is survived by his wife, singer and vocal coach Sonia Jones. She sang the title track for the film Monty Python's Life of Brian (1979).

== Discography ==
=== Living in a Box albums ===
- 1987: Living in a Box
- 1989: Gatecrashing

=== Solo albums ===
- 1994: How Many Angels
- 1999: Love Will Provide
- 2009: This I Swear (20 tracks special edition)

=== As musician/songwriter for other artists ===
Date	Album	Artist	Contribution
1980	Accelerate with the Mercurians	Accelerate with the Mercurians	Vocals, guitar
1981	Rocket Ticket	Gammer and his Familiars	Composer, guitar
1983	Love Tumbles Down (unreleased album)	Zu Zu Sharks	Composer, vocals, guitar
1985	Tough Girls (unreleased album)	Tessa Niles	Composer, guitar, backing vocals
1986	Salamandra	Miguel Bosé	Backing vocals
1987	Together Again	The Temptations	Composer
1988	Jellybean Rocks the House	Jellybean feat. Richard Darbyshire	Guest artist (vocals)
1989	Passion	Shirley Lewis	Composer
1991	Music of Quality and Distinction, Vol. 2	B.E.F. (British Electric Foundation)	Guest artist, vocals
1993	The Art of Romance	Mayumi	Composer, vocals
1994	Marie Claire D'Ubaldo	Marie-Claire D'Ubaldo	Composer
1994	Forever Now	Level 42	Composer
1994	Francesco Innamorato	Mike Francis	Composer, guitar, backing vocals
1995	A Different Air	Mike Francis	Composer, guitar, backing vocals
1995	Man on a Mission	Bing Abrahams	Composer
1997	Lisa Stansfield	Lisa Stansfield	Composer, arranger, backing vocals
1997	Credo	Jennifer Rush	Composer, backing vocals
1999	Swing: Soundtrack	Lisa Stansfield	Composer
1999	Distance	Charlotte	Composer
1999	Knockout: Soundtrack	Various Artists	Composer
2000	Sooner or Later	Hamish Stuart	Composer
2000	Minage	Mónica Naranjo	Composer
2001	Face Up	Lisa Stansfield	Composer, guitar, backing vocals
2001	Tommi Mischell	Tommi Mischell	Composer
2003	Temporary Madness	Jodie Brooke Wilson	Composer, backing vocals
2004	The Moment	Lisa Stansfield	Composer, guitar, vocal arrangement, backing vocals
2004	Elements of James Last Vol. 1	James Last	Composer, vocals, guitar, producer, vocal arrangement, backing vocals
2005	Pour être Libre	Lââm	Arranger, release coordinator
2006	Love in a Dangerous World	Kira Small	Composer
