= Snowboy =

Snowboy (a.k.a. Mark Cotgrove) is an English percussionist, bandleader, DJ and journalist.

== Discography ==
=== Albums ===
- Ritmo Snowboy (Acid Jazz, 1989)
- Descarga Mambito (Acid Jazz, 1991)
- Something's Coming (Acid Jazz, 1993)
- Pit Bull Latin Jazz (Acid Jazz, 1995)
- The Soul of Snowboy (Acid Jazz, 1995)
- Mambo Rage (Ubiquity, 1998)
- Afro Cuban Jazz (Ubiquity, 2000)
- The Hi-Hat: The True Jazz Dance Sessions (Ocho, 2000)
- Para Puente (Ubiquity, 2002)
- New Beginnings (Chillifunk, 2004)
- Communications (Freestyle, 2009)
- New York Afternoon (Snowboy Records, 2016)

=== Singles ===
- Bring on the Beat / When Snowboys Rocking the Mike / Guaguanco R.J.
- Mambo Teresa / Wild Spirit
- A Night in Tunisia / Ritmo Snowboy (Waterfront)
- Ritmo Snowboy / A Night in Tunisia (BGP)
- Snowboy's House of Latin
- Give Me the Sunshine / El Nuevo Latino
- Lucky Fellow / Astralisation
- Delirium / NyQuist Theorem
- Three Faces of Snowboy – Girl Overboard / Funky Djembe / 24 for Betty Page
- Where Is the Love?
- The New Avengers
- Jazzakuti
- Casa Forte
- Oya Ye Ye
- Los Rumberos De La Habana Y Matanzas/Baraggo
- It's About Time – DR Bob Jones and The Interns (featuring Snowboy)
- El Padrino
- I've Got to Learn to Mambo feat. James Hunter
- New York Afternoon feat. Marc Evans

== Books ==
- From Jazz Funk & Fusion to Acid Jazz: The History of the UK Jazz Dance Scene (2009), Chaser Publications (print-on-demand via AuthorHouse), ISBN 978-1-4389-7360-9
