= Digitalism discography =

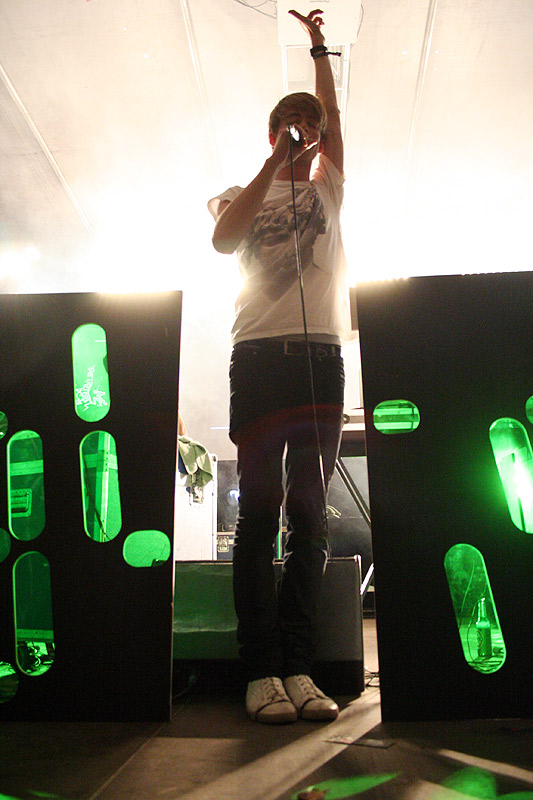
- Digitalism live at Melt 2007
- Studio albums: 5
- Extended plays: 22
- Live albums: 1
- Compilation albums: 3
- Singles: 45

This is a discography of the German electro house duo Digitalism.

== Albums ==
=== Studio albums ===
List of studio albums, with selected details and chart positions
Title	Album details	Peak chart positions				
Title	Album details	AUS	BEL (Fl)	BEL (Wa)	FRA	US Elect.
Idealism	Released: 9 May 2007; Label: Astralwerks; Format: CD, digital download, vinyl	—	20	88	84	6
I Love You Dude	Released: 20 June 2011; Label: V2; Format: CD, digital download, vinyl	41	81	77	95	—
Mirage	Released: 13 May 2016; Label: Magnetism Recording Co.; Format: CD, digital download, vinyl	—	80	188	—	16
JPEG	Released: 6 December 2019; Label: Magnetism Recording Co.; Format: Digital download, streaming, vinyl	—	—	—	—	—
Optimism	Released: 29 May 2026; Label: Magnetism Recording Co.; Format: Digital download, streaming, vinyl	—	—	—	—	—

=== Live albums ===
List of live albums, with selected details
Title	Album details
Idealism Live 2024 - London + Berlin	Released: 8 November 2024; Label: Magnetism; Formats: Digital download, streaming

=== Compilations ===
List of compilations, with selected details
Title	Album details
Kitsuné Tabloid (Compiled & Mixed by Digitalism)	Released: 24 June 2008; Label: Kitsuné Musique; Formats: CD, digital download
Hands on Idealism	Released: 9 December 2008; Label: Astralwerks; Formats: CD, digital download
DJ-Kicks	Released: 25 June 2012; Label: !K7; Formats: CD, digital download

== Extended plays ==
List of EPs, with selected details
Year	Title	Release date	Label
2007	Zdarlight – The Unrealized E.P.	2 April 2007	Virgin
2007	Terrorlight	16 April 2007	Kitsuné Musique
2007	The Twelve Inches E.P.	8 May 2007	Virgin
2008	Moshi Moshi E.P.	6 February 2008	V2
2008	Hands on Idealism E.P.	8 December 2008	V2
2010	Blitz - EP	8 November 2010	Kitsuné Musique
2011	I Club You, Dude	29 May 2011	V2
2011	Circles (Remixed)	6 December 2011	V2
2012	Encore (DJ Kicks Exclusive Remix Bonus EP)	29 June 2012	!K7
2012	DJ-Kicks Exclusives EP	6 July 2012	!K7
2012	Idealistic (The Classic Mixes)	5 November 2012	V2
2013	Lift	23 September 2013	Kitsuné Musique
2017	5KY11GHT	24 November 2017	Magnetism
2018	Zdar C1U6	23 March 2018	PIAS
2018	PR15M	13 September 2018	Magnetism
2019	Chapter 1	1 March 2019	Magnetism
2019	Chapter 4	26 May 2019	Magnetism
2020	Reality 2	3 October 2020	Running Back
2021	Chapter Y	19 March 2021	Magnetism
2022	Diytalism EP	25 March 2022	Diynamic
2023	Back to Haus	28 April 2023	Running Back
2024	FINALLY OUT	20 December 2024	Magnetism

== Singles ==
List of singles, with selected details
Year	Title	Release date	Label
2005	"Idealistic"	20 April 2005	Kitsuné Musique
2005	"Zdarlight"	13 October 2005	Kitsuné Musique
2006	"Zdarlight (Edition Moonlight / Discodrome)"	16 January 2006	Kitsuné Musique
2006	"Jupiter Room"	14 June 2006	Kitsuné Musique
2007	"Pogo"	7 May 2007	Kitsuné Musique
2008	"ZDRLT (Rewind)"	June 2008	Kitsuné Musique
2008	"Taken Away"	14 July 2008	EMI Music
2011	"2 Hearts"	24 May 2011	V2
2011	"Circles"	14 November 2011	V2
2012	"Falling" (Digitalism vs. Tommy Trash)	23 July 2012	Spinnin'
2014	"Fahrenheit 32"	21 January 2014	
2014	"Wolves" (featuring Youngblood Hawke)	23 June 2014	Magnetism
2015	"Second Chance"	19 January 2015	Magnetism
2015	"Roller"	8 June 2015	Magnetism
2016	"Utopia"	4 March 2016	PIAS
2016	"Battlecry"	4 March 2016	PIAS
2016	"The Ism"	7 March 2016	PIAS
2016	"Go Time"	1 April 2016	PIAS
2017	"Spektrum"	29 September 2017	Magnetism
2017	"Jet"	27 October 2017	Magnetism
2017	"5kyl1ght"	24 November 2017	Magnetism
2018	"Holograms"	2 February 2018	Magnetism
2018	"Red Lights"	2 March 2018	Magnetism
2018	"Space Race"	18 May 2018	Magnetism
2018	"Glow"	2 August 2018	Magnetism
2018	"UN1T"	16 November 2018	Magnetism
2019	"Knight Life"	6 September 2019	Ritter Butzke Studio
2019	"Wish I Was There"	1 November 2019	Magnetism
2019	"Panavision"	28 November 2019	Magnetism
2020	"Stuck?"	6 December 2020	Magnetism
2021	"No Holiday"	15 January 2021	Magnetism
2021	"Illusion"	26 November 2021	Magnetism
2022	"Hottest Record in the World"	28 January 2022	Magnetism
2022	"World Wide Night"	10 June 2022	Magnetism
2022	"People & Machines"	14 October 2022	Magnetism
2023	"Haus It Going"	7 April 2023	Running Back
2023	"Binary"	26 May 2023	Ritter Butzke Records
2023	"Highlight" (featuring Softee)	21 July 2023	Magnetism
2024	"Café Del Mar (Rework)"	26 September 2024	Magnetism
2025	"your love" (with David Bay)	25 April 2025	CURATORS
2026	"Liquid Bodies" (with Adana Twins)	2 January 2026	Kitsuné Musique
2026	"Space Invaders"	26 March 2026	Magnetism
2026	"Golden"	16 April 2026	Magnetism
2026	"Sirens"	30 April 2026	Magnetism
2026	"Achtung! Optimism"	15 May 2026	Magnetism

== Remixes ==
Year	Artist	Track	Title
2005	Cut Copy	"Going Nowhere"	
2005	Daft Punk	"Technologic"	Digitalism's Highway to Paris Remix
2005	Einzeller	"Schwarzfahrer"	
2005	Lisa Stansfield	"If I Hadn't Got You"	Digitalism Remix; Digitalism Dub
2005	Martin Peter featuring Mark Stewart	"Psychoville"	
2005	Munk	"Disco Clown"	
2005	Sono	"A New Cage"	Digitalism Remix; Digitalism Pogo Edition
2005	Tiga	"(Far From) Home"	
2005	The White Stripes	"Seven Nation Army"	Digitalism Twist-up Remix
2005	Tom Vek	"Nothing But Green Lights"	
2006	Cajuan	"Dance, Not Dance"	
2006	Depeche Mode	"Never Let Me Down Again"	
2006	Klaxons	"Atlantis to Interzone"	Digitalism's Klix Klax R-R-Remix
2006	Test Icicles	"What's Your Damage?"	
2006	The Cure	"Fire in Cairo"	Digitalism In Cairo
2006	The Futureheads	"Skip to the End"	Digitalism Remix; Digitalism Re-Rub
2006	The Presets	"Down Down Down"	
2007	Dave Gahan	"Kingdom"	Digitalism Remix; Digitalism Dub
2007	Digitalism	"Pogo"	Digitalism's Robotic Remix
2008	Digitalism	"Echoes"	Digitalism's Underwater Sonar Club Mix
2008	Digitalism	"Home Zone"	11th Avenue Is Burning Digitalism Criminal Club Mix
2008	Digitalism	"The Pulse"	Digitalism High Pulse Club Mix
2011	Digitalism	"2 Hearts"	Digitalism Techno Remix
2011	Digitalism	"Circles"	
2011	Peaches	"Mommy Complex"	Digitalism Edit
2011	Gustaf Grefberg	"Syndicate Theme"	
2012	Alex Gopher (featuring Saint Michel)	"Hello Inc."	
2012	Gai Barone	"Alicudi"	Digitalism Electro Clash Edit
2012	The Rapture	"Sail Away"	
2012	Syndicate OST	"Syndicate"	
2012	Stimming	"Funkworm"	
2012	WhoMadeWho	"Inside World"	
2013	Bloc Party	"Truth"	
2013	MØ	"Pilgrim"	
2013	The M Machine	"Moon Song"	
2015	Riton featuring Jagga	"Need Your Love"	
2016	GOOSE	"What You Need"	
2018	Superorganism	"Night Time"	Digitalism Nineties Time Remix
2019	Mixhell and Joe Goddard	"Killer Whale"	
2019	Uppermost	"Better Days Ahead"	Digitalism Better Beats Ahead
2020	Rocko Schamoni	"Ich und mein Pudel"	
2020	Sparkling	"We Don't Want It"	
2020	Luttrell	'My Friend The Sun"	Digitalism sound.wav Remix
2020	Luttrell	'My Friend The Sun"	Digitalism ERROR 404 Treatment
2021	The Knocks (feat. Mallrat)	"R U High"	
2021	Télépopmusik	"Breathe"	
2022	QRTR	"Fractals"	
2023	Prismode & Solvane feat. Max Joni	"Changes	
2023	Bob Moses	"Hanging On"	
2023	Florian Kruse & Kevin Knapp	"Rhythm Speech"	
2023	R. Missing	"My Time As a Ghostly Someone Else"	
2024	David Bay	"<3 beat"	Digitalism On The Level Remix
2024	Daddy Squad	"Music Is The Light"	
2024	Donkey Kid	"Appetite"	
2025	MRD	"dogfight"	Digitalism Dawg-to-Disco Remix
2025	Kungs & PNAU	"Light Me Up"	
2025	Princess Superstar	"Harrison Ford"	
