= The Moment (Lisa Stansfield album) =

Studio album by Lisa Stansfield
- Released: 27 September 2004
- Recorded: 2004
- Genres: R&B; soul; pop; adult contemporary
- Length: 79:55
- Labels: ZTT; Edel
- Producer: Trevor Horn

Lisa Stansfield chronology
| The Complete Collection (2003) | The Moment (2004) | Seven (2014) |

Alternative cover
- 2015 Expanded Reissue

Singles from The Moment
- 1. "Easier" Released: 4 October 2004; 2. "Treat Me Like a Woman" Released: 14 February 2005; 3. "If I Hadn't Got You" Released: 20 June 2005; 4. "He Touches Me" Released: 2 December 2005

The Moment is the sixth solo studio album by British singer Lisa Stansfield, released by ZTT Records on 27 September 2004. It was her first new studio album since 2001's Face Up. The Moment was entirely produced by Trevor Horn, the acclaimed producer behind Frankie Goes to Hollywood and Seal. It garnered positive reviews from music critics who praised Stansfield's voice and the fact that an established artist like her is still evolving and experimenting. The Moment was released in the United Kingdom and Japan in September 2004 and in Europe in February 2005, and performed moderately on the charts. Two main singles released from the album include "Treat Me Like a Woman" and "If I Hadn't Got You". On 6 April 2015, The Moment was re-released with five bonus tracks, three previously unreleased.

== Background ==
After releasing Face Up in June 2001 and Biography: The Greatest Hits in February 2003, Stansfield fulfilled her deal with Arista Records and signed with ZTT Records. The Grammy Award-winning Trevor Horn, who also founded ZTT Records, produced the entire album which was recorded in 2004. "The whole thing was just really refreshing. We would write really quickly and just go in and see what worked. Initially we played with a full band and then Trevor would add and take things away. But there is a live, relaxed feel to some of the vocals, which came from those early sessions. I am a real perfectionist and it was just really exciting to let go," Stansfield said and added on working with Horn: "He is very clever, he finds out the way you work and what you can do and then makes a space for you to work in. But then is also full of crazy ideas which are just fantastic." Between Biography: The Greatest Hits and The Moment Stansfield also recorded "I've Got the World on a String" for the Mona Lisa Smile soundtrack (2003) and "Too Hot" for Kool & the Gang's The Hits: Reloaded (2004).

== Content ==
The Moment was the first album not produced by Ian Devaney, Stansfield's husband and long-time collaborator. The production was handled by Trevor Horn, who produced successful songs and albums for numerous artists. Unlike Stansfield's previous albums, The Moment wasn't completely written by her and Devaney. Together with Richard Darbyshire (formerly of Living in a Box), they wrote four songs only: "He Touches Me", "The Moment", "Take My Heart" and "Love Without a Name". The album also contains five cover versions: "When Love Breaks Down" (from Prefab Sprout's 1985 album, Steve McQueen; especially for Stansfield, Paddy McAloon wrote an extra verse for her version), "Say It to Me Now" (from The Frames' 1995 album, Fitzcarraldo), "Lay Your Hands on Me" (from Caroline Henderson's 1995 album, Cinemataztic), "If I Hadn't Got You" (from Chris Braide's 1997 album, Life in a Minor Key) and "Takes a Woman to Know" (from No Angels 2003 album, Pure). One of the new songs, "Treat Me Like a Woman" was co-written by American singer-songwriter, Kara DioGuardi.

In September 2004, The Moment with eleven tracks was released on ZTT Records in the United Kingdom and Japan. In Europe, it was distributed in February 2005 by Edel Records as an enhanced CD with two music videos for "Treat Me Like a Woman" and "If I Hadn't Got You". In Germany, two additional versions of this album were also released: Basic Edition with nine tracks (June 2005) and Gold Edition with fifteen tracks, including two remixes of "If I Hadn't Got You" (March 2006). The Gold Edition also included desktop material, photo gallery, lyric booklet and a fold-out poster.

On 6 April 2015, The Moment was reissued with five bonus tracks, three previously unreleased, twenty-four-page booklet with lyrics and new liner notes. This expanded edition adds unreleased, alternate takes of the title track and the Prefab Sprout cover "When Love Breaks Down", alongside instrumental and live tracks.

== Singles ==
ZTT Records decided to release a double A-side single in the United Kingdom, "Easier" / "Treat Me Like a Woman". They set the release date for 4 October 2004, but the single was withdrawn at the last minute. The next single, "If I Hadn't Got You" was sent to radio stations in the United Kingdom on 22 November 2004 but wasn't released commercially. In Europe, Edel Records selected "Treat Me Like a Woman" as the lead single and released it on 14 February 2005. The song reached number thirty-six in Austria and forty-three in Germany. The next single, "If I Hadn't Got You" was issued on 20 June 2005 and peaked at number fifty-four in Austria and sixty-six in Germany. The last single from the album, "He Touches Me" was released in Germany on 2 December 2005. With "Treat Me Like a Woman" and "If I Hadn't Got You", Stansfield made the list of the most played British songs on German radio in 2005, reaching numbers nine and twelve respectively.

== Critical reception ==
Professional ratings
Review scores
| Source | Rating |
|---|---|
| AllMusic | 3.5/5 stars |
| BBC Music | Positive |
| Female First | Positive |

The Moment received positive reviews from music critics. According to Antony Hatfield from BBC Music, the album has "got class". He praised the "sophisticated adult-oriented pop" of "Easier", "Treat Me Like a Woman" as a "more feisty affair, full of texture and whit [sic]", the "pleasant groove" of "If I Hadn't Got You" and the "outstanding production" of "Takes a Woman to Know". He also called the album "a kind of 80s pop". According to Female First, the songs on The Moment reveal that Stansfield is "still evolving as an artist. To label this album as 'sophisticated adult-orientated pop' does it no justice." Female First called "When Love Breaks Down" a stand out track and also praised "The Moment" as "a sublime song featuring a 40-piece orchestra", "If I Hadn't Got You", "a soulful, honest, stylish and sensitive track", and "Treat Me Like a Woman", "which finds Stansfield at her best. Her voice is distinctive and powerful. What is enduring throughout the album is the variety of the material and the incredible range of Stansfield's voice." AllMusic gave it 3.5 stars out of 5.

== Commercial performance ==
The album was the most successful in Germany (number sixteen, Gold certification for selling over 100,000 copies), Austria (number fifteen) and Switzerland (number twenty-two). In the United Kingdom, The Moment failed commercially and peaked at number fifty-seven. It also reached number thirty-nine in Hungary, number forty-eight on the European Top 100 Albums, and number fifty-seven in Italy. The Moment also charted in Spain, Belgium and France.

== Track listing ==
| No. | Title | Writer(s) | Producer(s) | Length |
|---|---|---|---|---|
| 1. | "Easier" | Fiona Renshaw, Andy Wright | Trevor Horn | 4:38 |
| 2. | "Treat Me Like a Woman" | Kara DioGuardi, George Hammond-Hagan, John Hammond-Hagan, Layla Manoochehri | Horn | 3:59 |
| 3. | "When Love Breaks Down" | Paddy McAloon | Horn | 4:18 |
| 4. | "Say It to Me Now" | Glen Hansard, The Frames | Horn | 4:47 |
| 5. | "He Touches Me" | Lisa Stansfield, Ian Devaney, Richard Darbyshire | Horn | 4:36 |
| 6. | "Lay Your Hands on Me" | Thom Hardwell, Ian Morrow | Horn | 4:17 |
| 7. | "The Moment" | Stansfield, Devaney, Darbyshire, Horn | Horn | 4:50 |
| 8. | "If I Hadn't Got You" | Chris Braide, Chris Difford | Horn | 4:47 |
| 9. | "Take My Heart" | Stansfield, Devaney, Darbyshire, Lucinda Barry | Horn | 4:37 |
| 10. | "Love Without a Name" | Stansfield, Devaney, Darbyshire | Horn | 3:58 |
| 11. | "Takes a Woman to Know" | Terry Britten, Charlie Dore | Horn | 3:39 |

2005 European Enhanced Edition
| No. | Title | Writer(s) | Producer(s) | Length |
|---|---|---|---|---|
| 1. | "Easier" | Renshaw, Wright | Horn | 4:38 |
| 2. | "Treat Me Like a Woman" | DioGuardi, G. Hammond-Hagan, J. Hammond-Hagan, Manoochehri | Horn | 3:59 |
| 3. | "When Love Breaks Down" | McAloon | Horn | 4:18 |
| 4. | "Say It to Me Now" | Hansard, The Frames | Horn | 4:47 |
| 5. | "He Touches Me" | Stansfield, Devaney, Darbyshire | Horn | 4:36 |
| 6. | "Lay Your Hands on Me" | Hardwell, Morrow | Horn | 4:17 |
| 7. | "The Moment" | Stansfield, Devaney, Darbyshire, Horn | Horn | 4:50 |
| 8. | "If I Hadn't Got You" | Braide, Difford | Horn | 4:47 |
| 9. | "Take My Heart" | Stansfield, Devaney, Darbyshire, Barry | Horn | 4:37 |
| 10. | "Love Without a Name" | Stansfield, Devaney, Darbyshire | Horn | 3:58 |
| 11. | "Takes a Woman to Know" | Britten, Dore | Horn | 3:39 |
| 12. | "Treat Me Like a Woman" (music video) | DioGuardi, G. Hammond-Hagan, J. Hammond-Hagan, Manoochehri | Horn | 4:23 |
| 13. | "If I Hadn't Got You" (music video) | Braide, Difford | Horn | 3:51 |

2005 German Basic Edition
| No. | Title | Writer(s) | Producer(s) | Length |
|---|---|---|---|---|
| 1. | "Easier" | Renshaw, Wright | Horn | 4:38 |
| 2. | "Treat Me Like a Woman" | DioGuardi, G. Hammond-Hagan, J. Hammond-Hagan, Manoochehri | Horn | 3:59 |
| 3. | "When Love Breaks Down" | McAloon | Horn | 4:18 |
| 4. | "Say It to Me Now" | Hansard, The Frames | Horn | 4:47 |
| 5. | "He Touches Me" | Stansfield, Devaney, Darbyshire | Horn | 4:36 |
| 6. | "The Moment" | Stansfield, Devaney, Darbyshire, Horn | Horn | 4:50 |
| 7. | "If I Hadn't Got You" | Braide, Difford | Horn | 4:47 |
| 8. | "Take My Heart" | Stansfield, Devaney, Darbyshire, Barry | Horn | 4:37 |
| 9. | "Love Without a Name" | Stansfield, Devaney, Darbyshire | Horn | 3:58 |

2006 German Gold Edition
| No. | Title | Writer(s) | Producer(s) | Length |
|---|---|---|---|---|
| 1. | "Easier" | Renshaw, Wright | Horn | 4:38 |
| 2. | "Treat Me Like a Woman" | DioGuardi, G. Hammond-Hagan, J. Hammond-Hagan, Manoochehri | Horn | 3:59 |
| 3. | "When Love Breaks Down" | McAloon | Horn | 4:18 |
| 4. | "Say It to Me Now" | Hansard, The Frames | Horn | 4:47 |
| 5. | "He Touches Me" | Stansfield, Devaney, Darbyshire | Horn | 4:36 |
| 6. | "Lay Your Hands on Me" | Hardwell, Morrow | Horn | 4:17 |
| 7. | "The Moment" | Stansfield, Devaney, Darbyshire, Horn | Horn | 4:50 |
| 8. | "If I Hadn't Got You" | Braide, Difford | Horn | 4:47 |
| 9. | "Take My Heart" | Stansfield, Devaney, Darbyshire, Barry | Horn | 4:37 |
| 10. | "Love Without a Name" | Stansfield, Devaney, Darbyshire | Horn | 3:58 |
| 11. | "Takes a Woman to Know" | Britten, Dore | Horn | 3:39 |
| 12. | "If I Hadn't Got You" (Markus Gardeweg RMX) | Braide, Difford | Horn, Markus Gardeweg, Martin Weiland, Florian Sikorski | 7:28 |
| 13. | "If I Hadn't Got You" (Digitalism Dub) | Braide, Difford | Horn, Digitalism | 4:46 |
| 14. | "Treat Me Like a Woman" (music video) | DioGuardi, G. Hammond-Hagan, J. Hammond-Hagan, Manoochehri | Horn | 4:23 |
| 15. | "If I Hadn't Got You" (music video) | Braide, Difford | Horn | 3:51 |

2015 Expanded Reissue
| No. | Title | Writer(s) | Producer(s) | Length |
|---|---|---|---|---|
| 1. | "Easier" | Renshaw, Wright | Horn | 4:38 |
| 2. | "Treat Me Like a Woman" | DioGuardi, G. Hammond-Hagan, J. Hammond-Hagan, Manoochehri | Horn | 3:59 |
| 3. | "When Love Breaks Down" | McAloon | Horn | 4:18 |
| 4. | "Say It to Me Now" | Hansard, The Frames | Horn | 4:47 |
| 5. | "He Touches Me" | Stansfield, Devaney, Darbyshire | Horn | 4:36 |
| 6. | "Lay Your Hands on Me" | Hardwell, Morrow | Horn | 4:17 |
| 7. | "The Moment" | Stansfield, Devaney, Darbyshire, Horn | Horn | 4:50 |
| 8. | "If I Hadn't Got You" | Braide, Difford | Horn | 4:47 |
| 9. | "Take My Heart" | Stansfield, Devaney, Darbyshire, Barry | Horn | 4:37 |
| 10. | "Love Without a Name" | Stansfield, Devaney, Darbyshire | Horn | 3:58 |
| 11. | "Takes a Woman to Know" | Britten, Dore | Horn | 3:39 |
| 12. | "If I Hadn't Got You" (Radio Edit) | Braide, Difford | Horn | 3:42 |
| 13. | "Don't Explain" (Live at Ronnie Scott's) | Billie Holiday, Arthur Herzog, Jr. | Devaney | 4:53 |
| 14. | "When Love Breaks Down" (Alternate Version) | McAloon | Horn | 4:34 |
| 15. | "The Moment" (Alternate Version) | Stansfield, Devaney, Darbyshire, Horn | Horn | 4:43 |
| 16. | "Say It to Me Now" (Instrumental) | Hansard, The Frames | Horn | 4:43 |

== Personnel ==
Credits taken from AllMusic.

- Lisa Stansfield - lead and background vocals
- Lucinda Barry - background vocals
- Paul Beavis - drums
- Mark Bishop - engineer
- Jay Blatch - studio assistant
- Terry Britten - guitar
- Chris Cameron - string arrangements
- Tim Cansfield - guitar
- Ian Cooper - mastering
- Laurence Cottle - guitar
- Lol Creme - clavinet, guitar
- Richard Darbyshire - guitar, vocal arrangement
- Christoph Demetriou - harmonica, string arrangements, brass arrangement, programming, studio assistant
- Ian Devaney - arranger, vocal arrangement, guitar, background vocals, vocal engineer
- Anne Dudley - string arrangements
- Rachel George - personal assistant
- Isobel Griffiths - instrument technician
- Earl Harvin - drums
- Nigel Hitchcock - saxophone
- Trevor Horn - producer, guitar, keyboards, background vocals
- Nick Ingman - string arrangements
- Randy Jacobs - guitar
- Luís Jardim - percussion
- Gary Langan - engineer
- Taz Mattar - studio assistant
- Mary McCartney - photographs
- Perry Montauge-Mason - conductor
- Jamie Muhoberac - piano, keyboards, guitar, bass, rhythm box
- Pete Murray - piano, keyboards
- Robert Orton - drums, engineer, mix
- Phil Palmer - guitar
- Tim Pierce - guitar
- Steve Price - engineer
- Iain Roberton - engineer
- Paul Robinson - drums
- Charlie L. Russell - drum programming
- Steve Sidwell - trumpet
- Rob Smith - studio assistant
- Ian Thomas - drums
- Tim Weinder - mix
- Gavyn Wright - string conductor

== Charts ==
=== Weekly charts ===
| Chart (2004–05) | Peak position |
|---|---|
| Austrian Albums (Ö3 Austria) | 15 |
| Belgian Albums (Ultratop Flanders) | 90 |
| Belgian Albums (Ultratop Wallonia) | 93 |
| European Albums (Top 100) | 48 |
| French Albums (SNEP) | 109 |
| German Albums (Offizielle Top 100) | 16 |
| Hungarian Albums (MAHASZ) | 39 |
| Italian Albums (FIMI) | 57 |
| Spanish Albums (Promusicae) | 70 |
| Swiss Albums (Schweizer Hitparade) | 22 |
| UK Albums (Official Charts) | 57 |

=== Year-end charts ===
| Chart (2005) | Position |
|---|---|
| German Albums (Offizielle Top 100) | 125 |

== Certifications and sales ==
| Region | Certification | Certified units/sales |
|---|---|---|
| Germany (BVMI) | Gold | 100,000^{^} |
^{^} Shipments figures based on certification alone.

== Release history ==
| Region | Date | Label | Format | Catalog |
|---|---|---|---|---|
| United Kingdom | 27 September 2004 | ZZT | CD | ZTT192CD |
| Japan | 28 September 2004 | ZZT | CD | XECZ-1040 |
| Europe | 28 February 2005 | Edel | Enhanced CD | 0159952ERE |
| Germany | 20 June 2005 | Edel | CD (Basic Edition) | 0163832ERE |
| Germany | 24 March 2006 | Edel | Enhanced CD (Gold Edition) | 0171022ERE |
| United Kingdom | 6 April 2015 | Salvo (Union Square Music) | CD (Expanded Reissue) | SALVOCD070; 698458817020 |
| Germany | 10 April 2015 | Salvo (Union Square Music) | CD (Expanded Reissue) | SALVOCD070; 698458817020 |
