= If I Hadn't Got You =

Single by Lisa Stansfield

from the album The Moment
- Released: 20 June 2005
- Recorded: 2004
- Genre: R&B; pop
- Length: 4:47
- Label: ZTT; Edel
- Songwriters: Chris Braide; Chris Difford
- Producer: Trevor Horn

Lisa Stansfield singles chronology
"Treat Me Like a Woman" (2005)	"If I Hadn't Got You" (2005)	"He Touches Me" (2005)

Music video
- "If I Hadn't Got You" on YouTube

"If I Hadn't Got You" is a song recorded by Chris Braide for his 1997 album, Life in a Minor Key. It was covered in 2004 by British singer Lisa Stansfield for her album, The Moment. The song was written by Chris Braide and Chris Difford. Stansfield's version was produced by Trevor Horn and released as a commercial single in June 2005. An accompanying music video, directed by Steve Kemsley in 2004, was also released and included on the enhanced CD of The Moment in 2005.

== Reception ==
The song received positive reviews from music critics who wrote that this is Stansfield at her best, praising the pleasant groove and calling the track soulful, honest, stylish and sensitive. On 22 November 2004 the song was released as a promotional only single in the United Kingdom. The commercial single was issued in other European countries on 20 June 2005 and included remixes of the song created by German DJs, Markus Gardeweg, Martin Weiland, Florian Sikorski, Digitalism, Duffer Swift and Noor Akmorad. It peaked at number fifty-four in Austria and sixty-six in Germany. The song reached number twelve on the list of the most played British songs on German radio in 2005.

== Remixes ==
Two remixes of "If I Hadn't Got You" were included on the 2006 re-release of The Moment and Radio Edit of "If I Hadn't Got You" will be featured on the 2015 expanded reissue of the album to be released in April 2015.

== Track listings ==
UK promotional single

1. "If I Hadn't Got You" (Radio Edit) – 3:42

European CD single

1. "If I Hadn't Got You" (Radio Edit) – 3:42
2. "If I Hadn't Got You" (Album Version) – 4:47
3. "If I Hadn't Got You" (Markus Gardeweg Remix) – 7:28
4. "If I Hadn't Got You" (Digitalism RMX) – 5:17
5. "If I Hadn't Got You" (Digitalism Dub) – 4:46
6. "If I Hadn't Got You" (Digitalism Dubstrumental) – 4:46

European 12" single

1. "If I Hadn't Got You" (Markus Gardeweg Remix) – 7:28
2. "If I Hadn't Got You" (Need for Music Remix) – 5:30
3. "If I Hadn't Got You" (Digitalism Remix)– 5:17
4. "If I Hadn't Got You" (Digitalism Dub) – 4:46

== Charts ==
Chart (2005)	Peak position
Austria (Ö3 Austria Top 40)	54
Germany (Official German Charts)	66
Germany Airplay (BVMI)	5
Hungary (Editors' Choice Chart)	39
