= Big Thing =

Big Thing(s) may refer to:

== Music ==
- Big Thing (Duran Duran album), 1988
- Big Thing (Blue Zone album), 1988
  - "Big Thing" (song), a song by Blue Zone
- Big Things (album), 2002 album by P-Money
- Big Thangs, 1997 compilation album by Ant Banks
- Big Tings, 2018 album by Skindred

== Other uses ==
- Big Thing (TV series), a 2010 South Korean television drama
- Big Things, a sculpture exhibition series at the Royal Alberta Museum, Edmonton, Alberta, Canada
- Big things (Australia), large sculptures and novelty architecture used as tourist traps in Australia
- List of New Zealand's big things, novelty architecture in New Zealand

== See also ==
- The Next Big Thing (disambiguation)
