= Big Thing (Blue Zone album) =

Studio album by Blue Zone
- Released: June 1988
- Recorded: 1986–1987 in Liverpool, London, New York, Los Angeles
- Genre: Soul; funk; jazz
- Label: Arista
- Producer: Paul Staveley O'Duffy, Ric Wake, Blue Zone

Lisa Stansfield chronology
Big Thing (1988)	Affection (1989)

Singles from Big Thing
- 1. "On Fire" Released: 26 October 1987; 2. "Thinking About His Baby" Released: 25 January 1988; 3. "Jackie" Released: 26 July 1988

Big Thing is the only album by Lisa Stansfield's band, Blue Zone. It was released by Arista Records in June 1988. The songs were written by Blue Zone members: Stansfield, Ian Devaney and Andy Morris, and produced by Paul Staveley O'Duffy. The album also includes one cover, "Jackie," co-produced by Ric Wake. Big Thing spawned three singles: "On Fire," "Thinking About His Baby" and "Jackie." A remastered and expanded deluxe 2-CD set was released in the United Kingdom on 18 November 2016; it was the album's first release in the band's native country.

== Background ==
Blue Zone was formed in 1984 and consisted of Lisa Stansfield on vocals, and Ian Devaney and Andy Morris on instruments. In 1986, the trio released their first two singles: "Love Will Wait" and "Finest Thing." In 1987, they started working on their first album which was released in November 1988 but did not include "Love Will Wait" and "Finest Thing." The record company postponed the album many times and finally released it in Europe, North America and Australia in November 1988 and in Japan in early 1989. However, the album wasn't released in the United Kingdom until the 2016 deluxe edition.

== Content ==
The album includes eleven songs (ten on the US edition) written by Lisa Stansfield, Ian Devaney and Andy Morris, except for "Jackie" written by Billy Steinberg and Tom Kelly. "Jackie" was originally recorded by Elisa Fiorillo in 1987 for the Summer School soundtrack. The album was produced by Paul Staveley O'Duffy, except for "Perfect Crime" produced by Blue Zone. Ric Wake co-produced "Jackie" and "Perfect Crime." The US edition contains the full intro of "Perfect Crime," which was cut on other versions of the album.

== Singles ==
The first single from the album, "On Fire" was released on 26 October 1987 and peaked at number ninety-nine in the United Kingdom. The second single, "Thinking About His Baby" was issued on 25 January 1988 and reached number seventy-nine in the UK. On 26 July 1988, "Jackie" was released as a single in the United States and peaked at number fifty-four on the US Billboard Hot 100 and number thirty-seven on the Hot Dance Club Songs chart.

== Track listing ==
All tracks are written by Lisa Stansfield, Ian Devaney, and Andy Morris except "Jackie" by Billy Steinberg and Tom Kelly.

No.	Title	Producer(s)	Length
1.	"Jackie"	Paul Staveley O'Duffy, Ric Wake	3:49
2.	"Thinking About His Baby"	O'Duffy	4:03
3.	"Without a Word to Say"	O'Duffy	3:40
4.	"Sugar Tree"	O'Duffy	4:18
5.	"Her Seedy Life"	O'Duffy	4:51
6.	"Perfect Crime"	Blue Zone, Wake	4:16
7.	"One Kiss"	O'Duffy	4:58
8.	"Greedy Love"	O'Duffy	4:39
9.	"On Fire"	O'Duffy	3:47
10.	"We Will Cry"	O'Duffy	4:57
11.	"Feel It From Inside" (not on the US edition)	O'Duffy	4:40

2016 deluxe edition disc one
No.	Title	Producer(s)	Length
1.	"Jackie"	O'Duffy, Wake	3:49
2.	"Thinking About His Baby"	O'Duffy	4:03
3.	"Without a Word to Say"	O'Duffy	3:40
4.	"Sugar Tree"	O'Duffy	4:18
5.	"Her Seedy Life"	O'Duffy	4:51
6.	"Perfect Crime"	Blue Zone, Wake	4:16
7.	"One Kiss"	O'Duffy	4:58
8.	"Greedy Love"	O'Duffy	4:39
9.	"On Fire"	O'Duffy	3:47
10.	"We Will Cry"	O'Duffy	4:57
11.	"Feel It From Inside"	O'Duffy	4:40
12.	"Big Thing"	Blue Zone	4:59
13.	"Love Will Wait"	Blue Zone, Chris Porter	4:03
14.	"Finest Thing"	Blue Zone, Porter, Pete Wingfield	4:23
15.	"There Was I"	Blue Zone	4:39
16.	"Dirty Talk"	Blue Zone	4:43
17.	"Be the Sugar"	Blue Zone	4:59
18.	"Chance It"	O'Duffy	3:44

2016 deluxe edition disc two
No.	Title	Producer(s)	Length
1.	"Big Thing" (Extended Version)	Blue Zone	6:41
2.	"On Fire" (Conflagration Mix)	O'Duffy	8:09
3.	"Thinking About His Baby" (Extended Version)	O'Duffy	6:59
4.	"Jackie" (Wake Up Mix)	O'Duffy, Wake	7:04
5.	"Love Will Wait" (Extended Version)	Blue Zone, Porter	6:51
6.	"Finest Thing" (Extended Version)	Blue Zone, Porter, Wingfield	6:38
7.	"On Fire" (Extended Version)	O'Duffy	5:42
8.	"Jackie" (Shotgun Scream Mix)	O'Duffy, Wake	5:02
9.	"Love Will Wait" (Re-Mix)	Blue Zone, Porter	5:37
10.	"Finest Thing" (U.S. Remix)	Blue Zone, Porter, Wingfield	6:01
11.	"On Fire" (Dub) (Embers Mix)	O'Duffy	6:39
12.	"Big Thing" (Big Dub Club Mix)	Blue Zone	7:36

== Credits and personnel ==
- Nat Augustin – backing vocals
- Jocelyn Brown – backing vocals
- Tim Cansfield – guitar
- Ian Devaney – trombone, keyboards, guitar, backing vocals
- Lance Ellington – backing vocals
- Brandon Fields – saxophone
- Big George – bass
- Gary Grant – trumpet
- Jerry Hey – trumpet
- Dan Higgins – saxophone
- Kim Hutchcroft – saxophone
- Luís Jardim – percussion
- Dee Lewis – backing vocals
- Shirley Lewis – backing vocals
- Charlie Loper – trombone
- Dolette McDonald – backing vocals
- Andy Morris – trumpet, flugelhorn, keyboards, backing vocals
- Tessa Niles – backing vocals
- Paul Staveley O'Duffy – producer
- Phil Palmer – guitar
- Tom Peterson – saxophone
- Martyn Phillips – programming
- Bill Reichenbach Jr. – trombone
- Frank Ricotti – percussion
- Kevin Whitehead – drums
- Chris Whitten – drums
- Marcus Williams – bass
- Paul Wickens – keyboards

== Release history ==
Region	Date	Label	Format	Catalog
Europe	1988	Arista	LP	209 229
Europe	1988	Arista	CD	259 229
United States	1988	Arista	LP	AL-8552
United States	1988	Arista	CD	ARCD-8552
Australia	1988	Arista	LP	VPL1 7637
Japan	1989	Arista	CD	A32D-75
