= Joanne Accom =

Australian singer-songwriter (born 1978)

Joanne
- Also known as: Joanne
- Born: Joanne Ruth Charlotte Accom; 13 November 1978 (age 47); Melbourne, Victoria, Australia
- Genres: Pop, R&B
- Occupations: Singer, songwriter
- Years active: 1998–present
- Labels: Universal Music Australia, Blue Planet

Joanne Ruth Charlotte Accom (born 13 November 1978), mononymously known as Joanne, is an Australian singer and songwriter.

== Career ==
Joanne's first single, "Jackie", was released in late 1998. It reached No. 3 on the ARIA Charts, and became the highest selling single in Australia by an Australian artist during the 12-month period of eligibility for the 1999 ARIA Music Awards. For "Jackie", Joanne was credited as B.Z. featuring Joanne or Joanne/BZ, referring to the original performers of the song, Blue Zone.

She released the singles "Pack Your Bags" and "Are You Ready" in 1999.

Her next release was featuring on the track "Breakin' There's No Stoppin' Us" by Ilanda for The Wog Boy Movie in 2000.

Her only solo album, Do Not Disturb, was released in 2001 after being a work in progress for two and a half years. It features a remix of "Jackie", her two singles released in 1999 and three new singles, "So Damn Fine", "I Don't Know", and "Busted". It was produced and recorded in Dance World Studios, South Melbourne.

Joanne featured on a duet version of Janet Jackson's "Together Again" with Australian singer Greg Gould for his 2020 duets album 1998.

== Performances ==
She performed a number of her hits at Melbourne's Rumba along with other artists on Saturday 17 November 2001 at the Docklands Stadium.

She performed her hit "So Damn Fine" in front of a live audience across Australia at one of the Big Brother Australia 2001 live eviction shows during the closing credits.

Joanne joined the Vengaboys 2016 National Tour as a 'special local guest' alongside Tina Cousins, Sonique and Whigfield.

Joanne performed a number of her songs, including hit single "Jackie" and a selection of cover versions including C+C Music Factory's "Gonna Make You Sweat (Everybody Dance Now)" at the Pump '90s dance party at ARQ in Sydney on 8 April 2017.

== Discography ==
=== Studio albums ===
List of albums, with selected chart positions
Title	Album details	Peak chart positions
Title	Album details	AUS
Do Not Disturb	Released: September 2001; Label: Blue Planet (0144242)	45

=== Singles ===
Year	Single	Peak chart positions		Certification
Year	Single	AUS	NZL	Certification
1998	"Jackie"	3	5	ARIA: Platinum
1999	"Pack Your Bags"	54	31	
1999	"Are You Ready"	41	—	
2000	"Breakin' There's No Stoppin' Us" (Ilanda featuring Joanne)	38	—	
2001	"Busted"	36	—	
2001	"So Damn Fine"	25	—	
2001	"I Don't Know"	31	—	
2025	"Stand and Deliver"	—	—	
2025	"Fire to My Flame"	—	—	
2026	"Where's that Beat"	—	—	

== Awards and nominations ==
=== ARIA Music Awards ===
The ARIA Music Awards is an annual awards ceremony that recognises excellence, innovation, and achievement across all genres of Australian music.

Year	Nominee / work	Award	Result
1999	"Jackie"	Highest Selling Single	Won
