= Easier =

Easier may refer to:

- "Easier" (Lisa Stansfield song), 2004
- "Easier" (5 Seconds of Summer song), 2019
