= Breakin'... There's No Stopping Us =

1984 song by Ollie & Jerry

Single by Ollie & Jerry

from the album Breakin': Original Motion Picture Soundtrack
- B-side: "Showdown"
- Released: May 1984
- Recorded: 1984
- Genre: Synth-pop, freestyle, dance-pop
- Length: 4:34 (album version); 3:40 (single edit)
- Label: Polydor
- Songwriters: Ollie Brown, Jerry Knight
- Producers: Ollie Brown, Jerry Knight

Ollie & Jerry singles chronology
| "Breakin'... There's No Stopping Us" (1984) | "Electric Boogaloo" (1984) |

"Breakin'... There's No Stopping Us" is a song written and produced by American music duo Ollie & Jerry. The song was released on June 21, 1984 by Polydor Records, as the first single from the soundtrack to the 1984 film Breakin'. The song reached number nine on the US Billboard Hot 100 and number five on the UK Singles Chart. It topped the US dance charts for one week. It is the theme song to the film Breakin'. The drums were created using the Roland TR-808 drum machine.

== Music video ==
The music video features footage from the film Breakin', as well as numerous street break dancing performances. Jean-Claude Van Damme, who was an extra in the film, can be seen dancing in the background at one point.

== Track listing and formats ==
12" vinyl single

1. Breakin' ... There's No Stopping Us (Club Mix) 6:51
2. Breakin' ... There's No Stopping Us (Instrumental) 5:33

== Credits and personnel ==
- Ollie E. Brown - drum machine, synthesizers, production, mixing
- Jerry Knight - bass synth, production, mixing, engineering

== Charts ==
=== Weekly charts ===
| Chart (1984) | Peak position |
|---|---|
| Australia (Kent Music Report) | 25 |
| Belgium (Ultratop 50) | 27 |
| Netherlands (Single Top 100) | 27 |
| New Zealand (Recorded Music NZ) | 7 |
| UK Singles (Official Charts Company) | 5 |
| US Billboard Hot 100 | 9 |
| US Dance Club Songs (Billboard) | 1 |
| US Hot R&B/Hip-Hop Songs (Billboard) | 3 |

| Year-end chart (1984) | Rank |
|---|---|
| UK Singles (Gallup) | 75 |
| US Top Pop Singles (Billboard) | 80 |

== DJ Luck & MC Neat version ==
"Ain't No Stoppin' Us"

Single by DJ Luck & MC Neat feat. JJ

from the album It's All Good
- Released: 25 September 2000
- Recorded: 1999
- Genre: UK garage
- Label: Red Rose Recordings
- Songwriters: Ollie Brown, Jerry Knight
- Producer: DJ Luck

DJ Luck & MC Neat singles chronology
| "Masterblaster 2000" (2000) | "Ain't No Stoppin' Us" (2000) | "Piano Loco" (2001) |

In 1999, the song was covered by UK garage duo DJ Luck & MC Neat featuring singer JJ, retitled as "Ain't No Stoppin' Us". It first appeared on the Red Rose EP (1999), then was released as an official single the following year. Their version peaked at No. 8 on the UK Singles Chart.

=== Charts ===
| Chart (2000) | Peak position |
|---|---|
| Europe (Eurochart Hot 100) | 43 |
| UK Singles (OCC) | 8 |
| UK Dance (OCC) | 3 |

== Ilanda version ==
"Breakin'... There's No Stopping Us"

Single by Ilanda featuring Joanne

from the album Do Not Disturb
- Released: 2000
- Length: 3:27 (single version)
- Label: APO International PTY LTD
- Songwriters: Ollie Brown, Jerry Knight

Ilanda featuring Joanne singles chronology
| "Are You Ready" (1999) | "Breakin'... There's No Stopping Us" (2000) | "Busted" (2001) |

=== Charts ===
| Chart (2000) | Peak position |
|---|---|
| Australian ARIA Chart | 38 |
