= Love Will Wait =

Single by Blue Zone
- Released: March 1986
- Recorded: 1986
- Genre: Soul; funk; jazz
- Length: 4:20
- Label: Rockin' Horse; Arista
- Songwriters: Lisa Stansfield; Ian Devaney; Andy Morris
- Producer: Blue Zone

Blue Zone singles chronology
"Love Will Wait" (1986)	"Finest Thing" (1986)

"Love Will Wait" is the debut single by Lisa Stansfield's band, Blue Zone, released in the United Kingdom in March 1986. It was written by Stansfield, Ian Devaney and Andy Morris, and produced by Blue Zone. The single included two bonus tracks, "There Was I" and "Dirty Talk" (both written and produced by Blue Zone) which were later included on Stansfield's 2003 album, The Complete Collection. "There Was I" was also featured on the single "Jackie" in 1988. "Love Will Wait" was remixed by Julian Mendelsohn (Re-Mix) and Chris Porter (Extended Version).

== Track listings ==
UK 7" single

1. "Love Will Wait" – 4:20
2. "There Was I" – 4:28

UK 12" single

1. "Love Will Wait" (Extended Version) – 6:46
2. "There Was I" – 4:28

UK 12" single (Re-Mix)

1. "Love Will Wait" (Re-Mix) – 6:20
2. "Dirty Talk" – 4:40
3. "There Was I" – 4:28
