= Ilanda =

Melbourne-based pop group

- Also known as: Past to Present
- Origin: Melbourne, Victoria, Australia
- Genres: Vocal harmony, R&B, pop
- Years active: 1991–2000
- Labels: Mushroom, APO
- Past members: Leighton Hema; Frank Laga'aia; Lennie Keller; Norman Keller

Ilanda were an Australian-based vocal harmony and dance group who formed in 1991 as Past to Present. Initially a four-piece, with Leighton Hema, Frank Laga'aia, Lennie Keller and his brother, Norman. They are all New Zealand-born, though their heritage is Samoan. Past to Present teamed up with Peter Andre to feature on his single, "Get Down on It" (February 1996), which peaked at No. 5 on the ARIA Singles Chart and No. 1 on the New Zealand Singles Chart. When Hema left the group in 1998 they went into hiatus for a year and reconvened as a three-piece under the name, Ilanda, which had three top 40 Australian singles. Their last release was in May 2000.

== History ==
=== 1991–1997: Past to Present ===
All four Past to Present members: Leighton Hema, Frank Laga'aia, Lennie Keller and his brother, Norman Keller, were born in New Zealand of Samoan heritage. They grew up together and attended the same church choir. Laga'aia's older brother, Jay, is an Australian-New Zealand actor and singer. The Keller brothers migrated to Melbourne in 1980. In 1991 the quartet formed there, after Hema and Laga'aia had also migrated, as a vocal harmony and dance group. Samoan band, the Katinas, were a major inspiration.

As Past to Present, they signed with Mushroom Records and issued their debut single, "Crazy" (June 1995), which reached the top 50 on both the ARIA Singles Chart and the New Zealand Singles Chart. The track was co-written by the four band members. In the following month they issued an album, Four Noble Truths, which was produced by Ant Dale and Vince Deltito.

In February 1996 they appeared on Peter Andre's cover version of Kool & the Gang's single, "Get Down on It", as featured vocalists. It peaked at No. 5 on the ARIA Singles Chart and No. 1 on the New Zealand Singles Chart. On the ARIA end of the year charts it peaked in the top 50.

Their next single was a cover version of Earth, Wind & Fire's "September" (August 1996), which reached the ARIA Singles Top 50. Their album track "Sexuality", co-written by producers Dale and Deltito with M Stevens, was used on the soundtrack for the TV soap, Home and Away: The Sounds of Summer Bay (1996). A non-album single, "Ready Willing & Able", was issued in August 1997, which reached the top 40 in New Zealand.

The group left Mushroom Records in late 1997. According to Frank, "we had come to a crossroad [in 1997]. We just felt that if we were to carry on, we needed a 100 per cent control of our careers and felt like we knew how we wanted to be marketed from the promotional side of things – we'd been in the industry a good five years by then. We sat down with our management one day and decided to form APO records and APO International and then we got together our own production team." APO International ran recording studios, a record label, a management company and modelling agency. Leighton Hema left the group, citing personal reasons.

=== 1998–2000: Ilanda ===
Laga'aia and the Keller brothers resumed performing in early 1999 as a three-piece band under the name, Ilanda, (pronounced the same as "Islander") – a reference to their Samoan heritage. The new line-up's first single, "It's Our Time" (February 1999), peaked at No. 30 in Australia and No. 21 in New Zealand. In June of that year, Norman told Christie Eliezer of Billboard that "the music of Ilanda is obviously a statement of what we are. The Pacific feel is integral to our sound. The harmonies come from church choirs, and the way we play acoustic guitar reflects the fact that, at any Māori party, there's a tussle to grab the guitar for the inevitable sing along."

Ilanda had further top 40 chart success in Australia with their next two singles "Tasty" (September 1999) and "Breakin'... There's No Stopping Us" featuring Joanne Accom (May 2000). In August 2000 the group were working on their next album, Experience, which Frank described, "It's very eclectic to say the least... we've also got a touch of pop music in there as well as R&B, dance, ballads and up-tempo songs – so it's a very diverse album."

== Members ==
- Frank Laga'aia
- Lennie Keller
- Norman Keller
- Leighton Hema (departed whilst the band was still Past to Present)

== Discography ==
=== Albums ===
List of albums, with selected details
Title	Details
Four Noble Truths	Released: July 1995; Label: Mushroom (D31436, D24436); Format: CD

=== Singles ===
List of singles, with selected chart positions
Title	Year	Peak chart positions		Certification	Album
Title	Year	AUS	NZ	Certification	Album
Credited as Past to Present
"Slammin'"	1994	—	—		Four Noble Truths
"Crazy"	1995	46	43		Four Noble Truths
"Sexuality"	1995	79	—		Four Noble Truths
"Get Down on It" (with Peter Andre)	1996	5	1	ARIA: Gold; RMNZ: Platinum	Natural
"September"	1996	42	—		Home and Away: The Sounds of Summer Bay
"Ready Willing & Able"	1997	—	32		non album single
Credited as Ilanda
"It's Our Time"	1998	30	21		Non-album singles
"Tasty"	1998	25	—		Non-album singles
"Breakin' There's No Stoppin' Us" (featuring Joanne Accom)	2000	38	—		Non-album singles
