= Treat Me Like a Woman =

Single by Lisa Stansfield

from the album The Moment
- Released: 14 February 2005
- Recorded: 2004
- Genre: R&B; pop rock
- Length: 3:59
- Label: ZTT; Edel
- Songwriters: Kara DioGuardi; George Hammond-Hagan; John Hammond-Hagan; Layla Manoochehri
- Producer: Trevor Horn

Lisa Stansfield singles chronology
"Easier" (2004)	"Treat Me Like a Woman" (2005)	"If I Hadn't Got You" (2005)

Music video
- "Treat Me Like a Woman" on YouTube

"Treat Me Like a Woman" is a song recorded by British singer Lisa Stansfield for her 2004 album, The Moment. It was written by Kara DioGuardi, George Hammond-Hagan, John Hammond-Hagan and Layla Manoochehri, and produced by Trevor Horn.

The song received positive reviews from music critics who wrote that it finds Stansfield at her best and called it a "more feisty affair, full of texture and whit." At first, "Treat Me Like a Woman" was set for release in the United Kingdom as a double A-side single with "Easier." ZTT Records set the release date for 4 October 2004 but the single was withdrawn at the last minute. Later, "Treat Me Like a Woman" was selected as the lead single from The Moment in Europe and was issued on 14 February 2005. It peaked at number thirty-six in Austria and forty-three in Germany. The song reached number nine on the list of the most played British songs on German radio in 2005. An accompanying music video, directed by Kevin Godley in 2004, was also released and included on the enhanced CD of The Moment in 2005.

== Track listings ==
UK CD single

1. "Easier" – 4:38
2. "Treat Me Like a Woman" – 4:00
3. "Big Thing" (Redux) – 5:25

European CD single

1. "Treat Me Like a Woman" – 4:00
2. "Easier" – 4:37
3. "Love Without a Name" – 3:59

== Charts ==
Chart (2005)	Peak position
Austria (Ö3 Austria Top 40)	36
Germany (Official German Charts)	43
Hungary (Rádiós Top 40)	33
