= The Next Big Thing =

The Next Big Thing may refer to:

== Music ==
- Next Big Thing, a 2003 album by Vince Gill
  - "Next Big Thing" (song), the title track from the album
- The Next Big Thing (EP), an EP by Roh Ji-hoon
- The Next Big Thing, an Australian music competition won by:
  - Andrew Winton (1997)
  - John Butler (musician) (1998)
  - Harlequin League (2007)
- The Next Big Thing, a Chicago-area punk band that featured Mark Durante
- "The Next Big Thing", a song by Jesus Jones from Already (Jesus Jones album)
- "The Next Big Thing", a song by MxPx from The Ever Passing Moment

== Radio and television ==
- The Next Big Thing (radio series), an American radio series
- The Next Big Thing: NY, a 2012 American reality show
- Britain's Next Big Thing, a 2011 BBC documentary series presented by Theo Paphitis
- The Next Big Thing (miniseries), a Canadian TV documentary miniseries featuring Nikki Payne
- Next Big Thing, a program on Real Estate TV
- Next Big Thing, a category of the Spike Guys' Choice Awards
- The Next Big Thing, a series of TV ads for the Audi A1, featuring Justin Timberlake
- The Next Big Thing, a 1993 British TV fly-on-the-wall documentary following rock band FMB and singer Leona Naess

== Other uses ==
- The Next Big Thing (film), a 2001 film starring Marin Hinkle
- The Next Big Thing (video game), a point-and-click adventure game by Pendulo Studios
- The Next Big Thing, the working title of the PlayStation 3 video game LittleBigPlanet
- Brock Lesnar, nicknamed "The Next Big Thing", American professional wrestler and former mixed martial artist

== See also ==
- Big Thing (disambiguation)
