= Are You Ready (Joanne song) =

Single by Joanne

from the album Do Not Disturb
- Released: 8 November 1999
- Recorded: 1999
- Genre: Pop/R&B
- Length: 3:27 (single version)
- Label: APO International Ptd Ltd, Shock Records
- Songwriter(s): Joanne Accor; Maxim Kourilov; Azlan; Giannaros
- Producer(s): George Papapetrds

Joanne singles chronology
"Pack Your Bags" (1999)	"Are You Ready" (1999)	"Breakin' There's No Stoppin' Us" (2000)

"Are You Ready" is a song by Joanne, released as the third single from her 2001 debut album, Do Not Disturb. It was released on 8 November 2001. It debuted and peaked at No. 41 on the ARIA chart.

Track 3 on the single is featured as an extended version on the album Do Not Disturb on track 10. An alternative version is featured on the debut album on track 14 titled; "Hot Hot Crazy".

== Music video ==
The music video was filmed in November 1999, at Dance World 301 in a ballet studio. Joanne's management team and crew built the set with their own hands. Their aim was to create a mysterious location to set the scene for the video.

== Formats and track listings ==
Australian CD single:

1. "Are You Ready" [Radio Edit] (Azlan/Kourilov/Accom/Giannaros) – 3:27
2. "Are You Ready" [Extended Radio] (Azlan/Kourilov/Accom/Giannaros) – 5:53
3. "Are You Ready" [Pump Funk] (Azlan/Kourilov/Accom/Giannaros) – 4:07

== Charts ==
Chart (1999/2000)	Peak Position
Australia (ARIA)	41
