= Pack Your Bags =

Single by Joanne

from the album Do Not Disturb
- Released: 15 March 1999
- Recorded: Dance World 301
- Genre: Pop
- Length: 3:18
- Label: USA, Shock
- Songwriter(s): Leighton Hema; Norman Keller; Lennie Keller; Frank Laga'aia
- Producer(s): Leighton Hema; George Papapetros

Joanne singles chronology
"Jackie" (1998)	"Pack Your Bags" (1999)	"Are You Ready" (1999)

"Pack Your Bags" is a song by Joanne, released in March 1999 as her debut solo single, from her 2001 debut album Do Not Disturb. The song debuted and peaked No. 54 on the ARIA charts; Joanne's lowest charting single in Australia.

== Track listings ==
Australian CD single:

1. "Pack Your Bags" [radio edit] – 3:18
2. "Pack Your Bags" [radio extended mix] – 4:45
3. "Pack Your Bags" [Bullet Proof mix] – 4:20
4. "Pack Your Bags" [After 3 club mix] – 7:28
5. "Pack Your Bags" [Freak Me R&B mix] – 4:49

Australian limited edition CD single:

1. "Pack Your Bags" [radio edit] — 3:18
2. "Pack Your Bags" [radio extended mix] – 4:45
3. "Pack Your Bags" [Bullet Proof mix] – 4:20
4. "Pack Your Bags" [After 3 club mix] – 7:28
5. "Pack Your Bags" [Freak Me R&B mix] – 4:49
6. "Jackie" [radio edit] (Stenberg/Kelly) – 4:05
7. "Jackie" [XL club mix] (Stenberg/Kelly) – 8:18

== Charts ==
Chart performance for "Pack Your Bags"
Chart (1999)	Peak position
Australia (ARIA)	54
New Zealand (Recorded Music NZ)	31
