= So Damn Fine =

2001 single by Joanne

Single by Joanne

from the album Do Not Disturb
- Released: 16 April 2001
- Genre: Pop
- Length: 3:47 (album version); 3:35 (single version)
- Label: Blue Planet Productions
- Songwriters: Joanne Accor; Azlan
- Producers: George Papapetros; Maxim Kourilov

Joanne singles chronology
"Busted" (2001)	"So Damn Fine" (2001)	"I Don't Know" (2001)

"So Damn Fine" is a song by Joanne, the fifth single released from her first album, Do Not Disturb (2001). Released on 16 April 2001, it reached number 25 in Australia that July.

== History ==
"So Damn Fine" was released on 16 April 2001. It debuted and peaked at number 25 on the Australian Singles Chart, becoming her second-highest-charting single. "So Damn Fine" is the first track on Do Not Disturb. The music video was filmed in Bali. In an interview with the radio hosts Kyle Sandilands and Jackie O, Sandilands was dared to go to Bali with Joanne and her crew and to be in the video wearing Speedos, though he only appeared for three seconds in the video fully clothed near a waterfall.

== Track listing ==
Australian CD single

1. "So Damn Fine" (radio edit) (Accom/Azlan) — 3:35
2. "So Damn Fine" (radio extended) (Accom/Azlan) — 4:36
3. "So Damn Fine" (Superfly mix) (Accom/Azlan) — 4:53
4. "So Damn Fine" (Mirror Ball mix) (Accom/Azlan) — 5:46
5. "So Damn Fine" (Red Tonic club mix) (Accom/Azlan) — 6:34
6. "So Damn Fine" (Soleman's club mix) (Accom/Azlan) — 5:25
7. "Busted" (radio extended mix) (Accom/Azlan) — 5:07

== Charts ==
Chart (2001)	Peak Position
Australia (ARIA)	25
