= Keep Control =

2000 single by Sono

Single by Sono

from the album Solid State
- Released: 2001
- Recorded: 2000
- Genre: Electronic
- Length: 3:40
- Label: Zeitgeist (Germany); CodeBlue/EastWest Records (UK); Fuel/EastWest/Warner (Canada/Europe/Australia); Groovilicious (US)
- Songwriter(s): Martin Weiland
- Producer(s): Martin Weiland; Florian Sikorski

Sono singles chronology
"Keep Control" (2001)	"Blame" (2002)

"Keep Control" is a song by the German group Sono. It was released in 2001 as the lead single from their debut album Solid State, produced by Martin Weiland and Florian Sikorski, with lyrics written by Weiland and vocals performed by Lennart Salomon.

Despite being a modest club hit in Europe and a dismal showing on the German pop chart (peaking at number 93), the single and its recognizable melody would help fuel the trio to success in the United States, where the single reached No. 1 on the Billboard Hot Dance Club Play chart the week of July 14, 2001, where it held that position for four weeks, and would eventually become the number-one Dance Club Play song for 2001. It would also be the first of two number ones on the Dance Club Play chart for the trio, as their followup "Blame" also reached that position in 2002.

The single would later be released in 2009 as "Keep Control Plus" through Kontor Records (and Ultra Records in the US), featuring new mixes by Fedde Le Grand and Gregor Salto. This version got as far as #77 on the German pop chart.

In 2020, 20 years after its original release, a remix was published through Kontor Records by the Ukrainian group ARTBAT.

== Track listings ==
CD maxi (U.S.) (2001)

- "Keep Control (Original Radio Edit)" - 3:40
- "Keep Control (Terry Lee Brown Jr's Radio Edit)" - 3:40
- "Keep Control (Extended Mix)" - 7:14
- "Keep Control (Terry Lee Brown Jr's Vocal Mix)" - 6:49
- "Keep Control (Victor Calderone Remix)" - 9:57

CD (Germany) (2001)

- "Keep Control (Original Radio Edit)" - 3:40
- "Keep Control (Extended Mix)" - 7:29
- "Keep Control (Terry Lee Brown Jr's Vocal Mix)" - 6:49
- "Keep Control (Sono's Paperback Remix)" - 8:30
- "Keep Control (Miller & Floyd Remote Control Remix)" - 7:29

CD "New Edition" (Canada) (2001)

- "Keep Control (Original Radio Edit)" - 3:40
- "Keep Control (Acoustic Version)" - 3:54
- "Keep Control (Extended Mix)" - 7:29
- "Keep Control (The Scumfrog Remix)" - 7:07
- "Keep Control (Hydrogen Rockers Dub Mix)" - 6:41
- "Keep Control (Terry Lee Brown Jr's Vocal Mix)" - 6:49
- "Keep Control (Victor Calderone Remix)" - 9:57

CD (Italy) (2009)

- "Keep Control Plus (Gregor Salto Edit)" - 3:39
- "Keep Control Plus (Nu Edit)" - 3:36
- "Keep Control Plus (Gregor Salto Mix)" - 7:02
- "Keep Control Plus (Nu Club Mix)" - 7:42
- "Keep Control Plus (Fedde Le Grand Mix)" - 7:44
- "Keep Control Plus (Original Extended Mix)" - 7:30

MP3, single (Germany) (2013)

- "Keep Control (H.O.S.H. Remix)" - 8:30
- "Keep Control (Chopstick & Johnjon Remix)" - 8:15
- "Keep Control (Marc Romboy's Moog Journey)" - 7:18
- "Keep Control (Chopstick & Johnjon Remix Dub)" - 7:27
- "Keep Control (Marc Romboy's Space Echo Trip)" - 7:18

MP3, single (Germany) (2020)

- "Keep Control (ARTBAT Remix)" - 8:03

== Charts ==
=== Weekly charts ===
Chart (2000–01)	Peak position
Belgium (Ultratop 50 Flanders)	14
Belgium (Ultratop 50 Wallonia)	14
Canada (Nielsen SoundScan)	21
France (SNEP)	47
Germany (GfK)	51
Hungary (Dance Top 40)	25
Italy (FIMI)	24
Scotland (OCC)	52
UK Singles (OCC)	66
UK Dance (OCC)	21
US Billboard Hot Dance Club Play	1

=== Year-end charts ===
Chart (2001)	Position
Belgium (Ultratop Flanders)	89
Belgium (Ultratop Wallonia)	60
