= Blame (Sono song) =

2002 single by Sono

Single by Sono

from the album Solid State
- Released: 2002
- Genre: Electronic
- Length: 3:40
- Label: Zeitgeist (Germany); Groovilicious (US)
- Songwriter(s): Martin Weiland
- Producer(s): Martin Weiland; Florian Sikorski

Sono singles chronology
"Keep Control" (2000)	"Blame" (2002)	"2000 Guns" (2002)

"Blame" is a song by the German group Sono, released as a single in 2002 from their debut album Solid State, produced by Martin Weiland and Florian Sikorski, with lyrics written by Weiland and vocals performed by Lennart Solomon. The single was the follow-up to their 2001 debut "Keep Control", and like their first single this also reached No. 1 on the Billboard Hot Dance Club Play chart the week of July 13, 2002, where it held that position for one week. It would also be their final single to chart in the United States. In Germany, the single peaked at No. 65, their best showing on that country's pop chart.

== Track listings ==
12" (U.S.)

- "Blame (Gomi's Revenge Mix)" - 8:39
- "Blame (Gomi's Revenge Dub)" - 5:40
- "Blame (Guido Osorio Main Mix)" - 7:48
- "Blame (Guido Osorio Dub Mix)" - 7:01

CD maxi (Germany)

- "Blame (Edit)" - 3:56
- "Blame (Extended)" - 8:42
- "Red Sky (Nor Elle's Sundown Remix)" - 6:29
