= Thinking About His Baby =

Single by Blue Zone

from the album Big Thing
- Released: 25 January 1988
- Recorded: 1987
- Genre: Soul; funk; jazz
- Length: 4:01
- Label: Rockin' Horse; Arista
- Songwriters: Lisa Stansfield; Ian Devaney; Andy Morris
- Producer: Paul Staveley O'Duffy

Blue Zone singles chronology
"On Fire" (1987)	"Thinking About His Baby" (1988)	"Big Thing" (1988)

Music video
- "Thinking About His Baby" on YouTube

"Thinking About His Baby" is a song recorded by Lisa Stansfield's band, Blue Zone for their 1988 album, Big Thing. It was written by Stansfield, Ian Devaney and Andy Morris, and produced by Paul Staveley O'Duffy known for his work with Swing Out Sister, Curiosity Killed the Cat and Was (Not Was). "Thinking About His Baby" was released as the second European and first Japanese single on 25 January 1988.

It was remixed by Ron Saint Germain and the music video was also released. The song peaked at number seventy-nine in the United Kingdom. It became a minor club hit because of the B-side, "Big Thing" (a non-album track, written and produced by Blue Zone) that was picked up by DJs on Kiss-FM. The single sold 10,000 copies in a week.

== Track listings ==
European/Japanese 7" single

1. "Thinking About His Baby" – 4:01
2. "Big Thing" – 4:57

European 12" single

1. "Thinking About His Baby" (Extended) – 5:56
2. "Big Thing" (Extended) – 6:40

European CD single

1. "Thinking About His Baby" – 4:01
2. "Thinking About His Baby" (Extended Dance) – 6:58
3. "Big Thing" (Extended) – 6:40

== Charts ==
Chart (1988)	Peak position
Italy Airplay (Music & Media)	12
UK Singles (Official Charts)	79
