= On Fire (Blue Zone song) =

Single by Blue Zone

from the album Big Thing
- Released: 26 October 1987
- Recorded: 1987
- Genre: Soul; funk; jazz
- Length: 3:51
- Label: Rockin' Horse; Arista
- Songwriters: Lisa Stansfield; Ian Devaney; Andy Morris
- Producers: Paul Staveley O'Duffy; Blue Zone

Blue Zone singles chronology
"Finest Thing" (1986)	"On Fire" (1987)	"Thinking About His Baby" (1988)

Music video
- "On Fire" on YouTube

"On Fire" is a song recorded by Lisa Stansfield's band, Blue Zone for their 1988 album, Big Thing. It was written by Stansfield, Ian Devaney and Andy Morris, and produced by Paul Staveley O'Duffy (known for his work with Swing Out Sister, Curiosity Killed the Cat and Was (Not Was)) and Blue Zone. "On Fire" was released as the first European single on 26 October 1987.

It included a non-album track, "Be the Sugar" written and produced by Blue Zone. "On Fire" was remixed by François Kevorkian and Michael Hutchinson. The music video was also released. Shortly after the release of the single, the King's Cross fire broke out on 18 November 1987 at King's Cross St Pancras tube station. The fire killed thirty-one people and hundred were taken to hospital, nineteen with serious injuries. Just as the single was climbing up the charts (number ninety-nine in the United Kingdom), it was withdrawn by the record company in the UK in the wake of this disaster. In January 1988, the song peaked at number fifty-six in the Netherlands.

In 1993, the song was covered by Sonia on her album Better The Devil You Know, with the slightly longer title "Set Me On Fire".

== Track listings ==
Australian/European 7" single

1. "On Fire" – 3:51
2. "Be the Sugar" – 5:00

Australian/European 12" single

1. "On Fire" (Conflagration Mix) – 8:10
2. "On Fire" (Dub) (Embers Mix) – 6:39
3. "Be the Sugar" – 5:00

European CD single

1. "On Fire" (Extended) – 5:37
2. "On Fire" (Conflagration Mix) – 8:10
3. "Be the Sugar" – 5:00

== Charts ==
Chart (1987–1888)	Peak position
Netherlands (Single Top 100)	56
UK Singles (Official Charts)	99
