= Busted (Joanne song) =

2001 single by Joanne

Single by Joanne

from the album Do Not Disturb
- Released: 8 January 2001
- Genre: Pop
- Length: 3:09 (album version); 3:12 (single version)
- Label: Blue Planet Productions
- Songwriters: Joanne Accom; Azlan
- Producers: George Papapetros; Maxim Kourilov

Joanne singles chronology
"Breakin' There's No Stoppin' Us" (2000)	"Busted" (2001)	"So Damn Fine" (2001)

"Busted" is a song by Australian recording artist Joanne. It was released as the fourth single from her debut studio album, Do Not Disturb (2001), on 8 January 2001. The song peaked at No. 36 on the Australian ARIA Singles Chart on 25 February 2001.

== Track listings ==
Australian CD single

1. "Busted" (radio edit) (Accom, Azlan) – 3:15
2. "Busted" (radio extended mix) (Accom, Azlan) – 5:10
3. "Busted" (Miranda Rights club mix) (Accom, Azlan) – 6:22
4. "Busted" (The Girls Anthem mix) (Accom, Azlan) – 6:11
5. "Busted" (Funkalicious R&B mix) (Accom, Azlan) – 3:20

== Charts ==
Chart (2001)	Peak position
Australia (ARIA)	36
