= Go Time =

2016 song by Digitalism

Single by Digitalism

from the album Mirage
- Released: 1 April 2016
- Genre: Electronic rock
- Length: 5:08
- Label: PIAS
- Songwriter(s): Jens Moelle; İsmail Tüfekçi
- Producer(s): Jens Moelle; İsmail Tüfekçi

"Go Time" is a 2016 song by German electronic music duo Digitalism. It was the fourth single from the band's fourth album Mirage (2016) and was released on 1 April 2016.

== Production ==
The song features vocals from duo member Jens "Jence" Moelle. In an interview with Billboard, he claimed that "Go Time" was a later recording from the album and that it was created from adding more beats and guitars to a sample, while also noting that the vocals consisted of various lines the band came up with, saying "The first line that stuck with us was, “Let’s get Friday out of the way,” which is in the chorus. We didn't really know what that meant, but we knew it sounded right. It was good fun."

The music video for "Go Time" was released on 28 April 2016.

== Critical reception ==
"Go Time" was well-received after its release, with Music Times describing it as an "upbeat and cheery indie rock track", and Indie Music Filter claiming that the "driving bass and those climatic 80’s punk-pop synths really make a motivating, highly danceable track" and that it "belongs with a packed dance floor on a Saturday night". The song was very positively received by Colorado Public Radio, claiming "Each song on the album is danceable, but "Go Time" is a standout for its whirlwind tempo and synth riffs that emulate Giorgio Moroder's production work."

== Remixes ==
Two remixes were released the same year, with the Mumbai Science remix releasing on April 28, and the John Tejada remix releasing on May 26.

== In media ==
The song was featured in the soundtrack of 2016 open-world racing video game Forza Horizon 3 on the Horizon Pulse in-game radio station.
