= I Don't Know (Joanne song) =

2001 single by Joanne

Single by Joanne

from the album Do Not Disturb
- Released: 1 October 2001
- Genre: Pop
- Length: 3:19 (radio fast mix); 3:22 (radio slow mix)
- Label: Blue Planet; Universal Music Australia
- Songwriters: Joanne Accor; Azlan
- Producers: George Papapetros; Maxim Kourilov

Joanne singles chronology
"So Damn Fine" (2001)	"I Don't Know" (2001)

"I Don't Know" is a song by Joanne, which was released as the sixth and final single from her debut album, Do Not Disturb. It was released on 1 October 2001 and peaked at No. 31 on the Australian ARIA Singles Chart.

== Background ==
"I Don't Know" is built around Joanne's boyfriend who had moved away after one year of being together. His career had to take him to another state, and although Joanne was genuinely pleased for him, the thought of being away from him made her heart ache. Joanne poured all of those feelings into writing "I Don't Know", and hearing it completed on her debut album reminds Joanne of the day she had to say goodbye.

== Track listing ==
Australian CD single

1. "I Don't Know" (radio fast mix) – 3:19
2. "I Don't Know" (radio slow mix) – 3:22
3. "I Don't Know" (radio extended mix) – 4:49
4. "I Don't Know" (Peppermint mix) – 3:27

== Charts ==
Chart (2001)	Peak position
Australia (ARIA)	31
