= He Touches Me =

Single by Lisa Stansfield

from the album The Moment
- Released: 2 December 2005
- Recorded: 2004
- Genre: Pop; adult contemporary
- Length: 4:36
- Label: ZZT; Edel
- Songwriters: Lisa Stansfield; Ian Devaney; Richard Darbyshire
- Producer: Trevor Horn

Lisa Stansfield singles chronology
"If I Hadn't Got You" (2005)	"He Touches Me" (2005)	"Can't Dance" (2013)

"He Touches Me" is a song recorded by British singer Lisa Stansfield for her 2004 album, The Moment. It was written by Stansfield, her husband Ian Devaney and Richard Darbyshire from the 1980s band Living in a Box, and produced by Trevor Horn.

It is one out of four songs written by Stansfield for The Moment. For the first time, the songs weren't produced by Devaney. The production was handled by Horn who worked with Seal, Tina Turner, Cher, Robbie Williams, Frankie Goes to Hollywood and many others successful singers and bands. The song received positive reviews from music critics who called it a fine mainstream track. On 29 November 2005 Stansfield received a Women's World Award in Leipzig, Germany and performed "He Touches Me" at the ceremony. Three days later, on 2 December 2005, Edel Records released "He Touches Me" on a CD single in Germany but the song failed to chart. The single featured radio and album versions of "He Touches Me" and two other tracks from The Moment, including "Takes a Woman to Know" (originally by No Angels). The latter track entered the Hungarian Airplay Chart in April 2005 and peaked at number thirty-three in May 2005.

== Track listings ==
German CD single

1. "He Touches Me" (Radio Edit) – 4:27
2. "He Touches Me" (Album Version) – 4:36
3. "The Moment" (Radio Edit) – 4:50
4. "Takes a Woman to Know" – 3:39
