= Easier (Lisa Stansfield song) =

Single by Lisa Stansfield

from the album The Moment
- Released: 4 October 2004
- Recorded: 2004
- Genre: Soul; pop; adult contemporary
- Length: 4:38
- Label: ZZT; Edel
- Songwriters: Fiona Renshaw; Andy Wright
- Producer: Trevor Horn

Lisa Stansfield singles chronology
"Too Hot" (2004)	"Easier" (2004)	"Treat Me Like a Woman" (2005)

"Easier" is a song recorded by British singer Lisa Stansfield for her 2004 album, The Moment. It was written by Fiona Renshaw and Andy Wright, and produced by Trevor Horn.

Wright works most notably with Simply Red and with Mick Hucknall on his solo projects. He has also written and produced songs for Annie Lennox, David A. Stewart from Eurythmics, Tom Jones, Natalie Imbruglia, Atomic Kitten and many others. Horn is a well-known producer who worked with many singers and bands, including Seal, Tina Turner, Cher, Robbie Williams and Frankie Goes to Hollywood. "Easier" received positive reviews from music critics who called it a "sophisticated adult-oriented pop." It was set for release in the United Kingdom on 4 October 2004 as a double A-side single with "Treat Me Like a Woman." However, the single was withdrawn at the last minute by ZTT Records. It included a new version of "Big Thing," a song recorded by Stansfield's 1980s band, Blue Zone. In February 2005, "Treat Me Like a Woman" was released as an A-side single in other European countries.

== Track listings ==
UK CD single

1. "Easier" – 4:38
2. "Treat Me Like a Woman" – 4:00
3. "Big Thing" (Redux) – 5:25
