= I Love You Dude =

Studio album by Digitalism
- Released: 15 June 2011
- Genre: Electro house; electronic rock; dance-punk
- Length: 37:39
- Label: V2
- Producer: Jens Moelle; İsmail Tüfekçi

Digitalism chronology
Idealism (2007)	I Love You Dude (2011)	Mirage (2016)

Singles from I Love You Dude
- 1. "2 Hearts" Released: 15 April 2011; 2. "Circles" Released: 11 November 2011

Professional ratings
Aggregate scores
Source	Rating
Metacritic	58/100
Review scores
Source	Rating
AllMusic	4/5 stars
BBC Music	favourable
Clash	5/10
Drowned in Sound	7/10
The Guardian	3/5 stars
musicOMH	2.5/5 stars
NME	6/10
Now	2/5
Pitchfork	4.4/10
Slant Magazine	3/5 stars

I Love You Dude is the second studio album by German electronic music duo Digitalism, released on 15 June 2011 by V2 Records. The song "Forrest Gump" was co-written by Julian Casablancas of the Strokes.

== Track listing ==
All tracks are written by Jens Moelle and İsmail Tüfekçi, except where noted.

I Love You Dude track listing
No.	Title	Writer(s)	Length
1.	"Stratosphere"		3:00
2.	"2 Hearts"	Moelle; Tüfekçi; Alexander Burnett	3:56
3.	"Circles"	Moelle; Tüfekçi; Cornelius Ulrich	3:48
4.	"Blitz"		4:17
5.	"Forrest Gump"	Moelle; Tüfekçi; Julian Casablancas; Ulrich	3:33
6.	"Reeperbahn"		3:52
7.	"Antibiotics"		3:58
8.	"Just Gazin'"	Moelle; Tüfekçi; Cäthe; Ulrich	3:31
9.	"Miami Showdown"		3:25
10.	"Encore"		4:19
Total length:			37:39

Limited edition bonus tracks
No.	Title	Length
11.	"Harrison Fjord"	6:11
12.	"Silenz"	4:48
13.	"Blade"	5:50
14.	"Sleepwalker" (Japan bonus track)	2:00

Notes

- The Japanese edition switches tracks 1 and 4 and includes a bonus track, "Sleepwalker", as track 7.

== Personnel ==
Credits adapted from the liner notes of I Love You Dude.

- Jens Moelle – production, mixing, design
- İsmail Tüfekçi – production, mixing, design
- Cäthe – vocals on "Just Gazin'"
- Cornelius Ulrich – live drum performances
- Mark Ralph – vocal co-production
- Mike Marsh – mastering
- M†S – design

== Charts ==
Chart performance for I Love You Dude
Chart (2011)	Peak position
Australian Albums (ARIA)	41
Australian Dance Albums (ARIA)	9
Belgian Albums (Ultratop Flanders)	81
Belgian Albums (Ultratop Wallonia)	77
French Albums (SNEP)	95
German Albums (Offizielle Top 100)	72
Japanese Albums (Oricon)	56
Swiss Albums (Schweizer Hitparade)	65
UK Dance Albums (OCC)	16

== Release history ==
Release dates and formats for I Love You Dude
Region	Date	Format(s)	Label	Ref(s)
Japan	15 June 2011	CD; digital download	EMI Music Japan	
Germany	17 June 2011	CD; LP	V2	
Germany	20 June 2011	Digital download	V2	
France	20 June 2011	CD; digital download	V2	
United Kingdom	20 June 2011	CD; LP; digital download	V2	
United States	21 June 2011	Digital download	V2; Cooperative Music USA; Downtown	
Australia	1 July 2011	CD; digital download	Cooperative Music	
United States	5 July 2011	CD	V2; Cooperative Music USA; Downtown	
United States	26 July 2011	LP	V2; Cooperative Music USA; Downtown	
