= Do Not Disturb (Joanne Accom album) =

Studio album by Joanne Accom
- Released: 30 November 2001
- Genre: Pop, dance
- Label: Universal Music Australia / Blue Planet
- Producer: George Papapetros, Maxim Kourilov, Leighton Hema

Do Not Disturb is the only studio album from the dance-pop singer Joanne Accom released in 2001. It was a work in progress for two and a half years before it was released. The album reached No. 45 in Australia.

== Recording ==
Regarding the album, Joanne stated, "It's basically just a lot of personal experiences and a lot of things that I've gone through, put into writing. It was a great opportunity for me to grow, not only as a vocalist, but also as a songwriter."

== Track listing ==
No.	Title	Length
1.	"So Damn Fine" (Joanne, Azian)	3:47
2.	"All Through the Night" (Jay Laga'aia, Keller, Keller, Hema, Azlan)	4:02
3.	"Let's Go Back" (Joanne, Azian)	3:52
4.	"Phoney Baloney" (Joanne, Azian)	3:42
5.	"Jackie (2001 Remix)" (Billy Steinberg and Tom Kelly)	3:49
6.	"I Don't Know (Radio Slow Mix)" (Joanne, Azian)	3:19
7.	"Pack Your Bags" (Hema, Lala'gia, Keller, Keller)	3:26
8.	"You" (Joanne, Azian)	3:35
9.	"Busted" (Joanne, Azian)	3:09
10.	"Are You Ready (Extended Pump Funk)" (Azian, Kourilov, Joanne, Giannaros)	4:20
11.	"If He Were Mine" (Joanne, Azian)	3:33
12.	"Cuz U Can" (Kipner, Parker, Carwell)	3:13
13.	"What Kind of Friend Are You" (Joanne, Azian)	3:34
14.	"Hot Hot Crazy" (Azian, Kourilov, Joanne, Giannaros)	6:48
15.	"Don't Stay" (Laga'aia, Keller, Keller, Hema, Azian)	3:44
16.	"I Don't Know (Radio Fast Mix)" (Joanne, Azian)	3:19

== Singles ==
Year	Single	Peak chart positions	
Year	Single	AUS	NZL
1998	"Jackie"	3	5
1999	"Pack Your Bags"	54	31
1999	"Are You Ready"	41	—
2001	"Busted"	36	—
2001	"So Damn Fine"	25	—
2001	"I Don't Know"	31	—
