= Jackie (Elisa Fiorillo song) =

1987 song

"Jackie" is a song written by Billy Steinberg and Tom Kelly for the 1987 film, Summer School. It was originally recorded by Elisa Fiorillo and included on the Summer School soundtrack. In 1988, "Jackie" was recorded by Lisa Stansfield's band, Blue Zone for their 1988 album, Big Thing. It was released as a single and peaked at number fifty-four on the US Billboard Hot 100 and number thirty-seven on the Hot Dance Club Songs. In 1998, "Jackie" was recorded by Joanne, who used samples from the Blue Zone version. It was issued as B.Z. featuring Joanne and reached number three in Australia and number five in New Zealand. Another cover by Redzone peaked at number thirty-seven in Australia.

== Blue Zone version ==
"Jackie"

Single by Blue Zone

from the album Big Thing
- Released: July 26, 1988
- Recorded: 1988
- Genre: Soul; funk; jazz
- Length: 3:27
- Label: Rockin' Horse; Arista
- Songwriters: Billy Steinberg; Tom Kelly
- Producers: Paul Staveley O'Duffy; Ric Wake

Blue Zone singles chronology
"Big Thing" (1988)	"Jackie" (1988)

"Jackie" was covered by Lisa Stansfield's band, Blue Zone for their 1988 album, Big Thing. It was produced by Paul Staveley O'Duffy and Ric Wake and released as a single around the world. In North America, the single was issued on July 26, 1988, and reached number fifty-four on the Billboard Hot 100 and number thirty-seven on the Hot Dance Club Songs. It was also released in Europe in September 1988, in Australia in December 1988 and in Japan in early 1989. Jackie" reached number nineteen in Sweden in February 1989. The single included two non-album tracks, "There Was I" and "Chance It," both written and produced by Blue Zone. In 2003, "There Was I" was featured on Stansfield's album, The Complete Collection. "Jackie" was remixed by Ric Wake (Wake Up Mix) and Paul Staveley O'Duffy (Shotgun Scream Mix). The music video was also released.

=== Track listings ===
7" single - UK, Europe, Australia

1. "Jackie" – 3:27
2. "There Was I" – 4:30

7" single - US, Canada

1. "Jackie" – 3:27
2. "Chance It" – 3:45

12" single - Europe

1. "Jackie" (Wake Up Mix) – 7:00
2. "Jackie" (Shotgun Scream Mix) – 5:00
3. "There Was I" – 4:30

12" single - US, Canada

1. "Jackie" (Extended Dance Mix) – 7:02
2. "Jackie" (Single Version) – 3:27
3. "Jackie" (Instrumental) – 6:54
4. "Chance It" – 3:45

5" CD single - Europe / 12" single - Australia

1. "Jackie" – 3:27
2. "Jackie" (Wake Up Mix) – 7:00
3. "Jackie" (Shotgun Scream Mix) – 5:00
4. "There Was I" – 4:30

3" mini CD single - Europe

1. "Jackie" – 3:27
2. "Jackie" (Wake Up Mix) – 7:00
3. "There Was I" – 4:30
4. "Chance It" – 3:45

=== Charts ===
Chart (1988–1989)	Peak position
Australia (ARIA)	99
Sweden (Sverigetopplistan)	19
US Billboard Hot 100	54
US Dance Club Songs (Billboard)	37

== B.Z. featuring Joanne version ==
"Jackie"

Single by B.Z. featuring Joanne
- Released: August 1998
- Recorded: 1998
- Genre: Dance
- Length: 4:05
- Label: USA Records; Shock
- Songwriters: Billy Steinberg, Tom Kelly
- Producers: George Papapetros, Past to Present

B.Z. featuring Joanne singles chronology
"Jackie" (1998)	"Pack Your Bags" (1999)

Music video
- "Jackie" on YouTube

In 1998, Australian singer Joanne recorded "Jackie". Her rendition is largely based on Ric Wake's "Wake Up" remix of Blue Zone's version. It was released as a single and was credited to B.Z. featuring Joanne. The song peaked at number three in Australia and number five in New Zealand. "Jackie" won an ARIA Music Award for the Highest Selling Single in 1999. Two years later, the 2001 remix of the song was included on Joanne's debut album, Do Not Disturb.

=== Track listing ===
Australian CD single

1. "Jackie" (radio edit) – 4:05
2. "Jackie" (extended version) – 5:22
3. "Jackie" (XL club mix) – 8:18
4. "All of Me" (radio edit) by XL Connection – 4:18
5. "All of Me" (extended mix) by XL Connection – 7:52
6. "All of Me" (XL Race You to the Sun mix) by XL Connection – 9:23

=== Charts ===
==== Weekly charts ====
Chart (1998–1999)	Peak position
Australia (ARIA)	3
New Zealand (Recorded Music NZ)	5

==== Year-end charts ====
Chart (1998)	Position
Australia (ARIA)	93
Chart (1999)	Position
Australia (ARIA)	33

=== Certifications ===
Region	Certification	Certified units/sales
Australia (ARIA)	Platinum	70,000^{^}
^{^} Shipments figures based on certification alone.

== Redzone version ==
"Jackie"

Single by Redzone
- Released: September 1998
- Recorded: 1998
- Genre: Dance
- Length: 3:19
- Label: Mushroom
- Songwriters: Billy Steinberg, Tom Kelly
- Producer: Redzone

Music video
- "Jackie" on YouTube

"Jackie" was also covered by the Australian band, Redzone and released as a single in September 1998, simultaneously with the Joanne version. It peaked at number thirty-seven in Australia.

=== Track listings ===
Australian CD single

1. "Jackie" (Day Radio Edit) – 3:19
2. "Jackie" (Night Radio Edit) – 3:35
3. "Jackie" (Smash 'N' Grab's 'Lemon Jumper' Radio Edit) – 3:52
4. "Jackie" (12" Mix) – 6:58
5. "Jackie" (Smash 'N' Grab's 'Lemon Jumper' Club Mix) – 6:39
6. "O-Positive" – 4:01

=== Charts ===
Chart (1998)	Peak position
Australia (ARIA)	37
