= Finest Thing =

Single by Blue Zone
- Released: June 1986
- Recorded: 1986
- Genre: Soul; funk; jazz
- Length: 4:20
- Label: Rockin' Horse; Arista
- Songwriters: Lisa Stansfield; Ian Devaney; Andy Morris
- Producers: Blue Zone; Chris Porter; Pete Wingfield

Blue Zone singles chronology
"Love Will Wait" (1986)	"Finest Thing" (1986)	"On Fire" (1987)

"Finest Thing" is a song recorded by Lisa Stansfield's band, Blue Zone. It was written by Stansfield, Ian Devaney and Andy Morris, and produced by Blue Zone, Chris Porter and Pete Wingfield. The single was released in the United Kingdom and Germany in June 1986. "Finest Thing" was remixed by Nick Martinelli.

== Track listings ==
German/UK 7" single

1. "Finest Thing" – 4:20
2. "Love Will Wait" – 4:20

German/UK 12" single

1. "Finest Thing" (Extended Version) – 6:30
2. "Finest Thing" (7" Version) – 4:20
3. "Love Will Wait" (Extended Version) – 6:46

UK 12" single (Remix)

1. "Finest Thing" (U.S. Remix) – 6:00
2. "Finest Thing" (Instrumental Dub) – 5:10
3. "Love Will Wait" – 4:20
