= Mirage (Digitalism album) =

Studio album by Digitalism
- Released: 13 May 2016
- Genre: Electro house
- Length: 76:15
- Label: Magnetism; PIAS
- Producer: Jens Moelle; İsmail Tüfekçi

Digitalism chronology
I Love You Dude (2011)	Mirage (2016)	JPEG (2019)

Singles from Mirage
- 1. "Battlecry" Released: 4 March 2016; 2. "Utopia" Released: 4 March 2016

Professional ratings
Review scores
Source	Rating
AllMusic	4/5 stars
Hot Press	6/10
PopMatters	7/10
Renowned for Sound	2.5/5 stars

Mirage is the third studio album by German electronic music duo Digitalism, released on 13 May 2016 by Magnetism Recording Co. through PIAS. Jens Moelle and İsmail Tüfekçi produced all songs on the album, with Moelle providing all vocals aside from Anthony Rossomando of the band Dirty Pretty Things on "Battlecry" and the band's former tour bus driver Anthony Wilson providing a freestyle rap on the hip hop track "The Ism".

Along with the announcement of the album, the band released the tracks and first two singles, "Battlecry" and "Utopia". The band toured Europe, North America and Australia in May and June 2016 in support of the album.

== Critical reception ==
AllMusic's David Jeffries gave the record a 4/5 rating, stating that Mirage was about "impetus, hooks that won't quit, and slick synth constructions", and noted its influences from Pink Floyd's '70s-era sound mixing with Underworld's "usual minimalism" that comes with "indie spirit". Stephan Wyatt of PopMatters wrote that Mirage "avoids the clichéd themes" which affected the duo's previous album, in turn replacing them with "sub-bass ones and displeasing noises in pleasing ways" together with "synth swells and bass oscillations to create wild mood swings for the dance floor". He gave the album a 7/10 rating.

Paul Nolan from Hot Press was more critical of the album by saying that it "sticks closely to the EDM rulebook", especially "Arena" and "Battlecry", which are "thumping electro tracks with gaudy production and blaring choruses", reminiscent of DJs David Guetta and Skrillex. Michael Smith from Renowned for Sound felt that although the album had its high moments with "Arena", "Blink" and "Destination Breakdown", it suffered from other tracks lacking a hook and "featuring production choices that don’t make much sense in the grand scheme of the song or album", especially after the two-part track "Mirage".

== Track listing ==
Mirage track listing
No.	Title	Writer(s)	Length
1.	"Arena"	Jens Moelle; İsmail Tüfekçi	3:01
2.	"Battlecry"	Moelle; Tüfekçi; Anthony Rossomando	4:19
3.	"Go Time"	Moelle; Tüfekçi	5:08
4.	"Utopia"	Moelle; Tüfekçi	6:37
5.	"Destination Breakdown"	Moelle; Tüfekçi; Sam Martin; Simon Katz	7:44
6.	"Power Station"	Moelle; Tüfekçi	4:24
7.	"Open Waters"	Moelle; Tüfekçi	4:53
8.	"Mirage, Pt. 1"	Moelle; Tüfekçi	7:25
9.	"Mirage, Pt. 2"	Moelle; Tüfekçi	5:08
10.	"Indigo Skies"	Moelle; Tüfekçi	4:14
11.	"Dynamo"	Moelle; Tüfekçi	5:16
12.	"The Ism"	Moelle; Tüfekçi; Anthony Wilson	2:50
13.	"Shangri-La"	Moelle; Tüfekçi	3:41
14.	"No Cash"	Moelle; Tüfekçi	5:50
15.	"Blink"	Moelle; Tüfekçi	5:45
Total length:			76:15

== Personnel ==
Credits adapted from Mirage liner notes.

- Jens Moelle – production, vocals (all except track 2 and 12)
- İsmail Tüfekçi – production
- Anthony Rossomando – vocals (track 2)
- Anthony Wilson – rapping (track 12)
- Matt Wiggins – mixing
- Chab – mastering
- Yoshi Sodeoka – artwork
- Richard Robinson – design

== Charts ==
Chart performance for Mirage
Chart (2016)	Peak position
Belgian Albums (Ultratop Flanders)	80
Belgian Albums (Ultratop Wallonia)	188
US Top Dance/Electronic Albums (Billboard)	16
