= Idealism (album) =

Studio album by Digitalism
- Released: 9 May 2007
- Genre: Indietronica, electro house, electronic rock, dance-punk
- Length: 53:14
- Label: Virgin
- Producer: Jens Moelle, İsmail Tüfekçi

Digitalism chronology
Idealism (2007)	I Love You Dude (2011)

Professional ratings
Aggregate scores
Source	Rating
Metacritic	76/100
Review scores
Source	Rating
AllMusic	4/5 stars
The Guardian	4/5 stars
Montreal Mirror	9.5/10
NME	8/10
Pitchfork	5.2/10
PopMatters	3/10
Spin	6/10
Stylus Magazine	C
URB	4.5/5 stars

Idealism is the debut studio album by German electronic music duo Digitalism, released on 9 May 2007 by Virgin Records. In the United States, it was released on 19 June 2007 by Astralwerks. Five of the album's fifteen tracks—"Idealistic", "Zdarlight", "Digitalism in Cairo", "Jupiter Room" and "Pogo"—were previously released as EPs prior to the release. The song "Digitalism in Cairo" samples The Cure's 1979 song "Fire in Cairo". The CD gives access to Opendisc where seven additional tracks can be downloaded.

"Idealistic" was used by Rockstar Games in the announcement trailer for their video game Midnight Club: Los Angeles. It is also used in a commercial for Airness on French TV. "Pogo" is used in a few commercials, including a 2007 Pontiac commercial and a Virgin Mobile commercial, and was featured in Need for Speed: ProStreet and FIFA 08. "Idealistic" is featured in Just Dance 2 and Saints Row: The Third and a sample of it is used by the American radio call-in programme Loveline at the beginning of each segment prior to going on air. "Zdarlight" is used in a BMW X1 commercial and a remix of "Zdarlight" was also used in the trailer for Nadeo's TrackMania Nations Forever released in early 2008.

== Track listing ==
All tracks are written by Jens Moelle and İsmail Tüfekçi, except where noted.

Idealism track listing
No.	Title	Writer(s)	Length
1.	"Magnets"		3:50
2.	"Zdarlight"		5:41
3.	"I Want I Want"		3:29
4.	"Idealistic"		4:11
5.	"Digitalism in Cairo"	Moelle, Tüfekçi, Robert Smith, Michael Dempsey, Laurence Tolhurst	4:49
6.	"Departure from Cairo"		0:54
7.	"Pogo"	Moelle, Tüfekçi	3:46
8.	"Moonlight"		2:52
9.	"Anything New"		4:59
10.	"The Pulse"		4:19
11.	"Home Zone"		2:09
12.	"Apollo-Gize"		2:20
13.	"Jupiter Approach"		1:13
14.	"Jupiter Room"		5:03
15.	"Echoes"		3:39
Total length:			53:14

== Personnel ==
Credits adapted from Idealism liner notes.

- Jens Moelle – vocals (1, 3–5, 7–9, 11, 12); producer (all tracks); drawings
- İsmail Tüfekçi – producer
- Åbäke – design
- Heiko Prigge – photography

== Charts ==
Chart performance for Idealism
Chart (2007)	Peak position
Australian Dance Albums (ARIA)	23
Belgian Albums (Ultratop Flanders)	20
Belgian Albums (Ultratop Wallonia)	88
French Albums (SNEP)	84
Japanese Albums (Oricon)	20
UK Albums (OCC)	95
UK Dance Albums (OCC)	2
US Top Dance Albums (Billboard)	6
US Heatseekers Albums (Billboard)	29

== Release history ==
Release history for Idealism
Region	Date	Label
Japan	9 May 2007	EMI Music Japan
Australia	8 June 2007	etcetc
Germany	8 June 2007	Virgin
United Kingdom	11 June 2007	Virgin
France	11 June 2007	Virgin, Labels, Kitsuné
Canada	19 June 2007	EMI Music Canada
United States	19 June 2007	Astralwerks
