= Big Thing (song) =

1988 single by Blue Zone

Single by Blue Zone
- Released: 14 March 1988
- Recorded: 1987
- Genre: Soul; funk; jazz
- Length: 4:57
- Label: Rockin' Horse; Arista
- Songwriters: Lisa Stansfield; Ian Devaney; Andy Morris
- Producer: Blue Zone

Blue Zone singles chronology
"Thinking About His Baby" (1987)	"Big Thing" (1988)	"Jackie" (1988)

"Big Thing" is a song recorded by Lisa Stansfield's band, Blue Zone. It was written by Stansfield, Ian Devaney and Andy Morris, and produced by Blue Zone. At first, "Big Thing" was released on the B-side of "Thinking About His Baby" on 25 January 1988.

"Big Thing" was picked up by DJs on Kiss-FM and Tony Blackburn on his BBC Radio London show. Thanks to that the single sold 10,000 copies in a week. Because of this success, "Big Thing" was released on the A-side, and "Thinking About His Baby" on its B-side. For this release, "Big Thing" was also remixed by Blue Zone (Big Dub Club Mix).

Although Blue Zone's 1988 album was titled Big Thing, it did not feature "Big Thing." The song was later included on "This Is the Right Time" single (1989), The Complete Collection box set (2003), and "Easier/Treat Me Like a Woman" single (2004). Stansfield performed it during her 2013 Seven Tour.

== Track listings ==
UK 12" single

1. "Big Thing" (Extended) – 6:40
2. "Big Thing" (Big Dub Club Mix) – 7:30
3. "Thinking About His Baby" – 4:01

Other remixes

1. "Big Thing" – 4:57
2. "Big Thing" (Extended Edit) – 5:40
3. "Big Thing" (Redux) – 5:25
