= Life in a Minor Key =

Studio album by Chris Braide
- Released: 1998
- Recorded: 1997–1998
- Genre: Pop
- Length: 50:37
- Labels: Atlantic Records, Anxious Records, East West Records Braide Productions Inc.
- Producers: Chris Braide, David A. Stewart

Chris Braide chronology
Chapter One (1994)	Life in a Minor Key (1998)

Life in a Minor Key is musical artist Chris Braide's second studio album.

David A. Stewart's label Anxious Records signed Chris Braide in London, United Kingdom, It was Braide's second solo album.

On the liner notes of the reissued limited edition vinyl David A. Stewarts writes: "I met Chris Braide in London when he was only 24 years old, yet he was so mature as a songwriter and a consummate musician. Chris could sing and play any of his songs effortlessly on piano or guitar and he and I spent many days and weeks at Church Studios experimenting amongst the vortex of creative chaos that tends to surround me and I could see that Chris was soaking up everything and enjoying being amongst lots of other crazy artists. Chris could sing like a bird and he also could attract a lot of birds too! He had the whole package………..amazing musician, great songwriter, fantastic voice and if that wasn’t enough he looked like a young Marc Bolan! So after a while I marched him off to Greenwich village in NYC where I bought him a silver glitter guitar and we spent time in the Jimi Hendrix Studio Electric Lady where in the early hours of the morning we staggered out with a great album. I hope you enjoy listening to it as much as I enjoyed making it!" Dave Stewart, Los Angeles, 2012

Braide recorded the album at Electric Lady Studios, New York, The Church Studio, London UK and Miraval Studios, France.

Two singles were released from the album including the opening track "If I Hadn’t Got You", and "Heavenly Rain".

The video for "If I Hadn’t Got You" was directed by Zanna and filmed at The Ragged School in London.

The video for "Heavenly Rain" was filmed in New Orleans.

Craig Kallman heard Chris perform at a showcase in London and signed him to Atlantic Records. The single release of "If I Hadn’t Got You" was accompanied by a new video filmed in Times Square.

The album was reissued on limited edition red vinyl by label Plane Groovy Records in 2013.

== Track listing ==
- All songs written by Chris Braide except for "If I Hadn’t Got You" and "Out of The Blue" written by Chris Braide and Chris Difford
1. "If I Hadn’t Got You" – 4:34
2. " Heavenly Rain " – 4:23
3. "The Choice is Yours" – 4:13
4. "Life in a Minor Key" – 4:33
5. "Summer Fever" – 4:20
6. "Suffer for Love" – 3:47
7. "Out of the Blue" – 3:50
8. "Beautiful Things" – 3:48
9. "She Still Sings" – 5:06
10. "If I Hadn't Got You Reprise" – 0:47

== Personnel ==
- Chris Braide – vocals, (Grand Piano), keyboards, producer
- David A. Stewart- Producer
- Bob Rosa – mixing
- Phil Bodger – mixing
- Gota Yashiki- drums
- Caroline Dale and London Metropolitan Orchestra String Arrangement
- Patrick Howley – electric guitar
- Karen Poole – backing vocals
- Karen Cox – backing vocals
- Zhana Saunders – backing vocals
- Ramona Keller – backing vocals
- Bernie Worrell – wah clav and Hammond organ
- Zanna – Photography and Art Direction
- Marissa Hine– Stylist
- Stacey Kelly– Make-up
