= Blue Zone (band) =

British band

- Origin: Rochdale, England
- Genres: Pop, blue-eyed soul
- Years active: 1984–1988
- Label: Arista
- Past members: Lisa Stansfield; Ian Devaney; Andy Morris

Blue Zone (known as Blue Zone UK in the United States due to a naming dispute there) were a 1980s British band. The group consisted of Lisa Stansfield (lead vocals), Ian Devaney (trombone, keyboards, guitar, backing vocals) and Andy Morris (trumpet, flugelhorn, electronic keyboards, backing vocals).

== History ==
After the singles "On Fire", "Thinking About His Baby" (released in 1987), "Jackie" and album Big Thing (released in 1988), the trio and label Arista decided to focus on Stansfield's solo career. Morris would co-write and co-produce the first three Stansfield albums before departing the trio. Devaney and Stansfield would eventually marry and now own a music publishing business while they also continue to write and record together.

== Discography ==
=== Studio albums ===
Title	Album details
Big Thing	Released: November 1988; Label: Arista; Formats: CD, LP, cassette

=== Singles ===
Title	Year	Peak chart positions				Album
Title	Year	UK	NLD	US	US Dance	Album
"Love Will Wait"	1986	—	—	—	—	—N/a
"Finest Thing"	1986	105	—	—	—	—N/a
"On Fire"	1987	99	56	—	—	Big Thing
"Thinking About His Baby"	1988	79	—	—	—	Big Thing
"Big Thing"	1988	—	—	—	—	—N/a
"Jackie"	1988	—	—	54	37	Big Thing
"—" denotes releases that did not chart or was not released
