= Sono (band) =

German band

SONO (Lat.: make a sound; be heard; Esperanto: sound) is a pop/electronic band from Hamburg, Germany formed in 2000 by Lennart A. Salomon (vocals, guitar), Florian Sikorski (keyboards) and Martin Weiland (keyboards, DJ).

== History ==
F. Sikorski and M. Weiland have been producing music together since 1995 and pursuing careers within the music industry. F. Sikorski is a sound engineer and runs a music studio, "Maratone Music." Madonna, Britney Spears and Kelly Clarkson, among others, have recorded and mixed there. M. Weiland is active in the commercial music business in labels and sales.

L. A. Salomon, originally a drummer, singer and guitarist for a large number of local bands around Hamburg, joined in 2001, marking the founding of SONO. He works as a composer and musician and runs, among other things, the funk and rock band project Jerobeam.

Musically, SONO could be categorized widely as pop, with strong influences from techno, house and electro. This musical diversity has provided SONO with a considerable number of fans from various music scenes.

Aside from studio projects, SONO performs in various live constellations, from DJ live sequencing sets to stage performances including a large rhythm section.

== Discography ==
=== Albums ===
- Solid State (2002; Zeitgeist/Polydor)
- Live in Cologne (2005) (iTunes exklusiv)
- Off (2005; PIAS)
- RMXD (2006; PIAS)
- Panoramic View (2007; PIAS)
- Plus (2009; Kontor Records)
- Backyard Opera (2016; Kontor Records)
- Human (2018; Kontor Records)
- In The Haze (2023; Kontor Records)
- Lost Lovers Motel (2025; Sono Records)

=== Singles ===
Year	Single	Peak chart positions	
Year	Single	GER	US Dance
2001	"Keep Control"	93	1
2002	"Blame"	65	1
2002	"2000 Guns"	65	—
2002	"Since You're Gone"	—	—
2003	"Heading For"	—	—
2005	"A New Cage"	—	—
2006	"Whatever"	—	—
2007	"All Those City Lights"	—	—
2009	"Keep Control Plus"	77	—
2009	"Better"	—	—
2013	"Flames Get Higher"	—	—
"—" denotes releases that did not chart

== Awards ==
- Keep Control: Billboard: 2001 Year-End Chart-Toppers "Top Hot Dance Club Play Singles" #01

== Literature ==
Astrid Vits: Du und viele von deinen Freunden 1. 34 deutsche Bands und Solo-Künstler im Interview. Schwarzkopf & Schwarzkopf, Berlin 2004, ISBN 3-89602-621-6
