= Digitalism (band) =

German electronic music duo

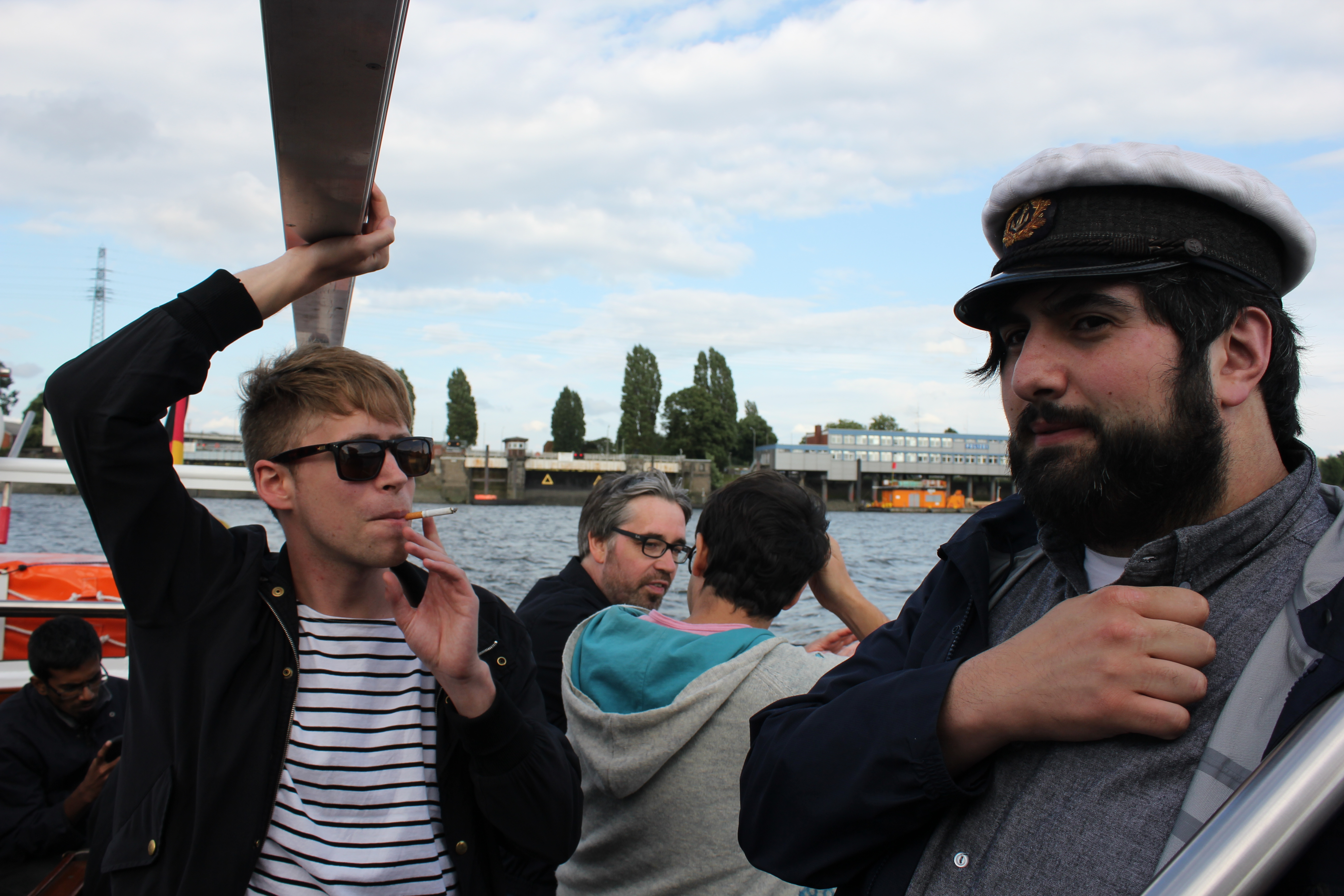
- Moelle (left) and Tüfekçi (right) in 2012

Background information
- Origin: Hamburg, Germany
- Genres: Electro house; electronic rock; dance-punk; alternative dance; indietronica; complextro; synthwave
- Years active: 2004–present
- Labels: Virgin; Kitsuné; Astralwerks; V2; PIAS Cooperative
- Members: Jens Moelle; İsmail Tüfekçi
- Website: thedigitalism.com

Digitalism are a German electronic music duo formed in Hamburg by Jens Moelle and İsmail Tüfekçi in 2004. The duo are signed to French label Kitsuné, as well as Virgin Records and Astralwerks in other parts of the world.

== Band history ==
=== Formation, Idealism, and I Love You Dude (2004–2011) ===
Moelle and Tüfekçi met at a record store in Hamburg and became friends. Later, the store's owner asked them to DJ a party, and they began mixing and recording together. According to Moelle, they record their music in a World War II bunker they own in Hamburg.

Digitalism's debut album, Idealism, was released in Japan on 9 May 2007 by Toshiba EMI, in France on 21 May 2007 by Kitsuné, in North America by Astralwerks, and in Australia and New Zealand by etcetc and Virgin Records. The album includes re-edits of previously released singles "Jupiter Room" and "Zdarlight" as well as their "Digitalism in Cairo" original re-edit of a track by The Cure.

In 2008, the single "Taken Away" was released, It was used by Mercedes-Benz to advertise their new crossover the Mercedes-Benz GLK.

The Pogo EP was released as a single in support of the album in May, with two alternate versions of the track. Digitalism released their EP Blitz under Kitsuné on 8 November 2010.

On 7 April 2011 they announced the album I Love You Dude, which was released on 20 June 2011.

=== DJ-Kicks and singles (2012–2013) ===
Over the course of almost two years—early 2012 to the end 2013—Digitalism released 13 original tracks on 5 separate international dance labels from America to England, Germany to the Netherlands with sub-releases of these singles in Japan, Australia and France. These releases also featured 3 Digitalism remixes of their peers and a mix album that released on International Record label Studio !K7 featuring all but a few of tracks. The DJ-Kicks album debuted the band in the German and UK Albums sales charts. The majority of the music was written and recorded in Los Angeles during the Winter and early spring months from 2012 to 2013. During this time the band toured both as DJs and a live act, playing all of these dance-oriented releases as well as material from the first and second albums in Europe, Japan, Australia, America, Canada, South America and the United Kingdom.

=== "Fahrenheit 32" and "Wolves" (2014–2015) ===
In January 2014, Digitalism released Fahrenheit 32 exclusively on their SoundCloud profile and announcement of a tour in the US and period of recording. The release of "Fahrenheit 32" was an immediate success for Digitalism, featuring on BBC Radio, KCRW and Sirius Radio in the US.

During the Winter of 2014, the band once more relocated from Hamburg, Germany to Los Angeles, United States to record new material. In May 2014, the band released "Wolves" featuring American indie band Youngblood Hawke, debuting in Germany and receiving radio playlist support in the US on KCRW and SiriusXM. The release of "Wolves" was backed by the international telecommunications company Vodafone, who used the record in a national campaign for a period of eight months, employing Digitalism to front the campaign with DJ shows and interviews.

=== Mirage (2016–2025) ===
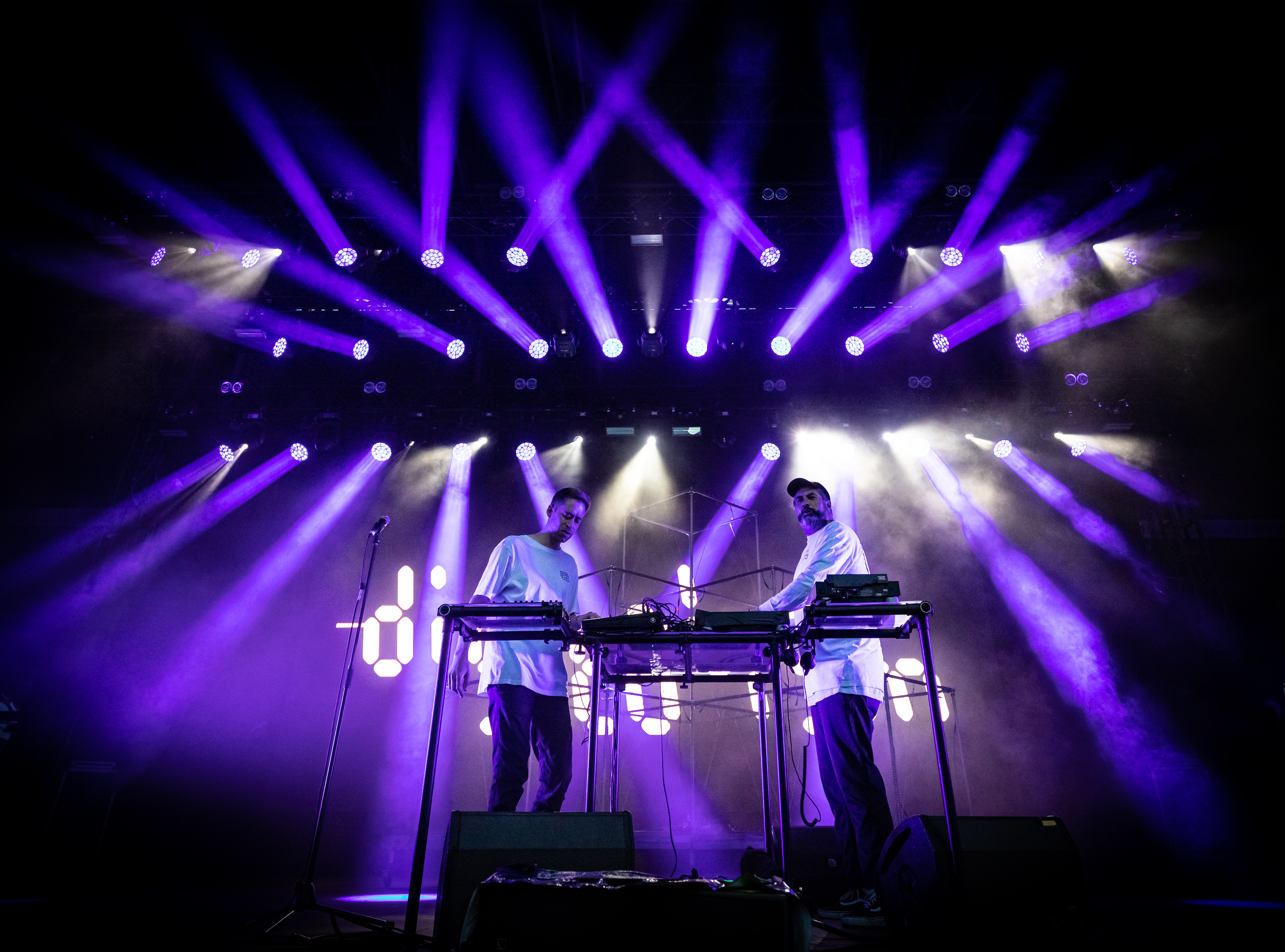
Digitalism live at Rock am Ring 2022

On 4 March 2016, the duo announced their first album in five years entitled Mirage, released on 13 May, along with promotional singles "Utopia" and "Battlecry". On 7 March 2016, the band announced the Mirage world tour in support of the album, including dates in France, Germany, the United States, the United Kingdom, and more. The first official video for the Mirage campaign was for "Utopia", and it was premiered on KALTBLUT Magazine on 19 March 2016.

=== Optimism (2026–present) ===
On 16 March 2026, the band announced a new album, titled Optimism, set to release on 28 May. On 26 March, the band released "Space Invaders", the lead single off of the album. On 17 April, "Golden" was released. Then on 30 April "Sirens", and on 15 May their final single "Achtung! Optimism" dropped. Optimism has since received praise towards Digitalism as they draw in fans of the next generation.

== Influences ==
Digitalism cite Daft Punk and film soundtracks as influences, as well as video game music, Ennio Morricone, The Strokes, Stuart Price and Roulé Records.

== Live act ==
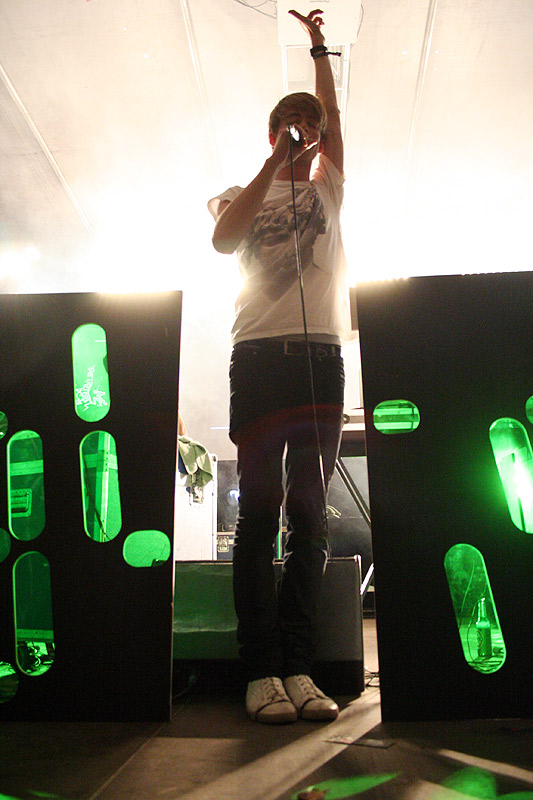
Digitalism performing at Melt! 2007

To mirror the influence of their second studio album I Love You Dude, the band rebuilt their live show and incorporated more modular synthesisers, which they would play live—this involved adding a live drummer. As a live act, they shared the stage with many acts including Queens of the Stone Age, DJ Shadow, Moderat, and Justice. At the same time as DJs, they developed a following with house and techno sets.

Digitalism have made appearances at festivals such as Coachella, Lollapalooza, South by Southwest, Rhythm and Vines, Electric Picnic, and Ultra Music Festival.

== Discography ==
- Idealism (2007)
- I Love You Dude (2011)
- Mirage (2016)
- JPEG (2019)
- Optimism (2026)
