= The Bamboos (funk band) =

Australian funk and soul band

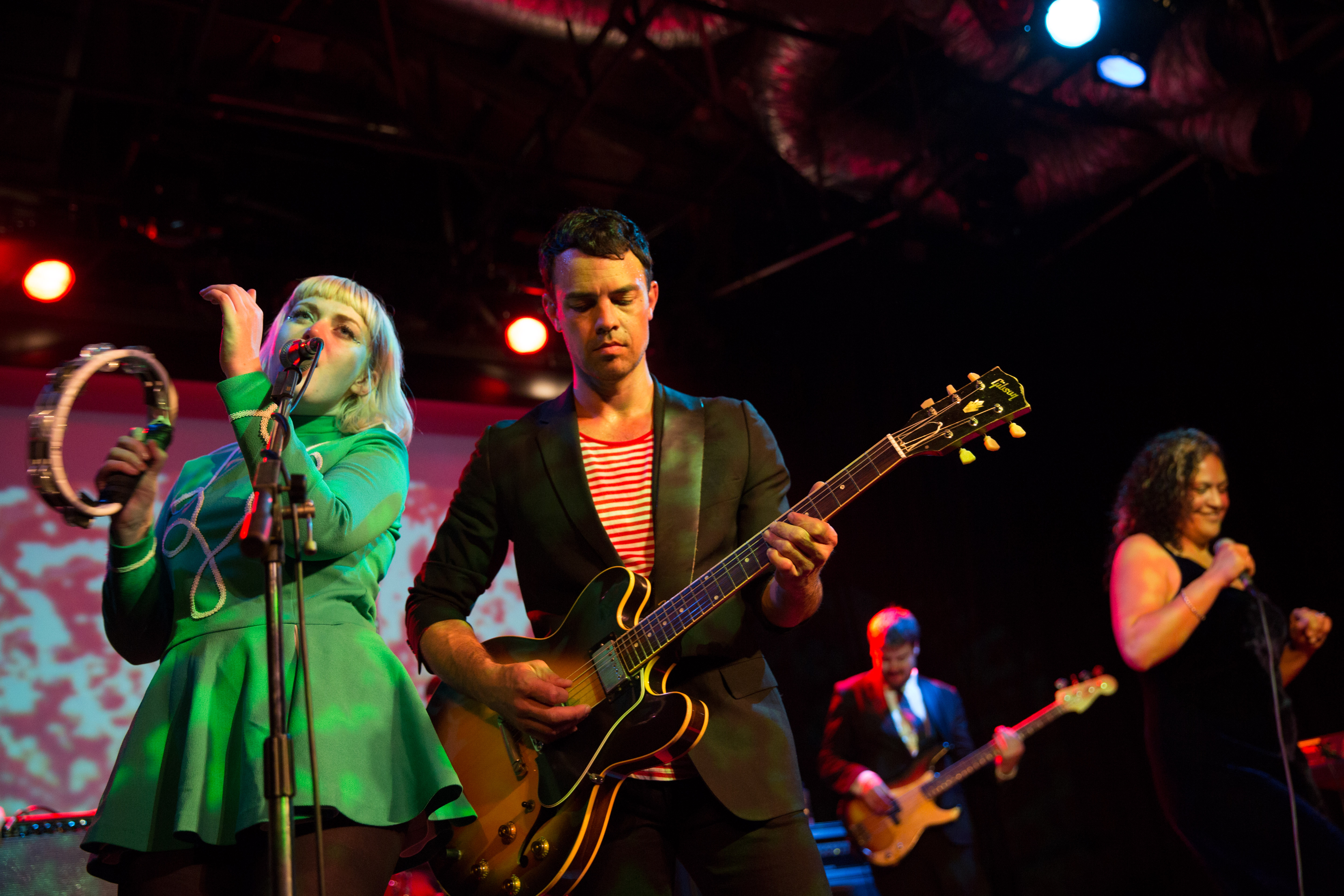
- The Bamboos performing at the Factory in 2013

Background information
- Origin: Melbourne, Australia
- Genres: Funk; soul
- Years active: 2000–present
- Labels: Atlantic; Pacific Theatre; Tru Thoughts
- Members: Lance Ferguson; Graeme Pogson; Yuri Pavlinov; Anton Delecca; Ross Irwin; Phil Noy; Kylie Auldist; Daniel Mougerman
- Past members: Daniel Farrugia; Stuart Speed; Scott Lambie; Jamie Jones; Ella Thompson; Simon Mavin
- Website: thebamboos.com

The Bamboos are an Australian funk and soul band from Melbourne.

== Biography ==
=== 2000–2005: Formation and early releases ===
The Bamboos were formed in 2000 in Melbourne, Australia by New Zealand-born producer/guitarist/songwriter, Lance Ferguson. The initial line-up consisted of Ferguson, Ben Grayson on Hammond organ, Stuart Speed on bass and Scott Lambie on drums. The band's first live performances were at The Night Cat in Fitzroy, Victoria, where over an evening they would play three sets of instrumental material drawn from artists such as The Meters, James Brown, Grant Green, Ivan "Boogaloo Joe" Jones and Reuben Wilson.

In 2001 The Bamboos released their debut 7" single containing the original songs "Eel Oil" and "Blackfoot", earning them international acclaim from UK Deep Funk DJs Keb Darge, Snowboy, Mr Scruff, Patrick Forge and Russ Dewbury.. During 2002 Grayson was involved in an electronic, dance band side project, Origene.

The Bamboos second release was a remix for a side project of UK artist, Quantic called "The Limp Twins". It was released as a 7" B-side on the Brighton-based UK label Tru Thoughts in 2003. By this point, Scott Lambie and Stuart Speed had left the band to be replaced by drummer Jamie Jones and current bassist Yuri Pavlinov. A horn section consisting of Ross Irwin on trumpet and Bruce Sandell on tenor saxophone and flute expanded the line up to a six-piece.

In 2004, the Bamboos released the single, "Tighten Up"/"Voodoo Doll". Both Jamie Jones and Bruce Sandell left the band in 2004 to be replaced by Daniel Farrugia and Tenor Saxophonist Anton Delecca.

In November 2004 the band toured Australia and New Zealand with U.K artists Quantic and Alice Russell, performing as a substitute backing band for Will Holland's regular The Quantic Soul Orchestra line up.

A chance meeting between Lance Ferguson and label A&R Rob Luis in a Brighton club (where Ferguson was able to hand Luis a demo of new material) led to The Bamboos being signed to his Tru Thoughts label full-time in 2005.

In late 2005 the band embarked on a second tour of Aus/NZ with (now label mates) The Quantic Soul Orchestra, Alice Russell. Russell would record two vocal tunes during this time for the bands upcoming full-length debut album.

=== 2006–2009: Step It Up, Rawville and Side-Stepper ===
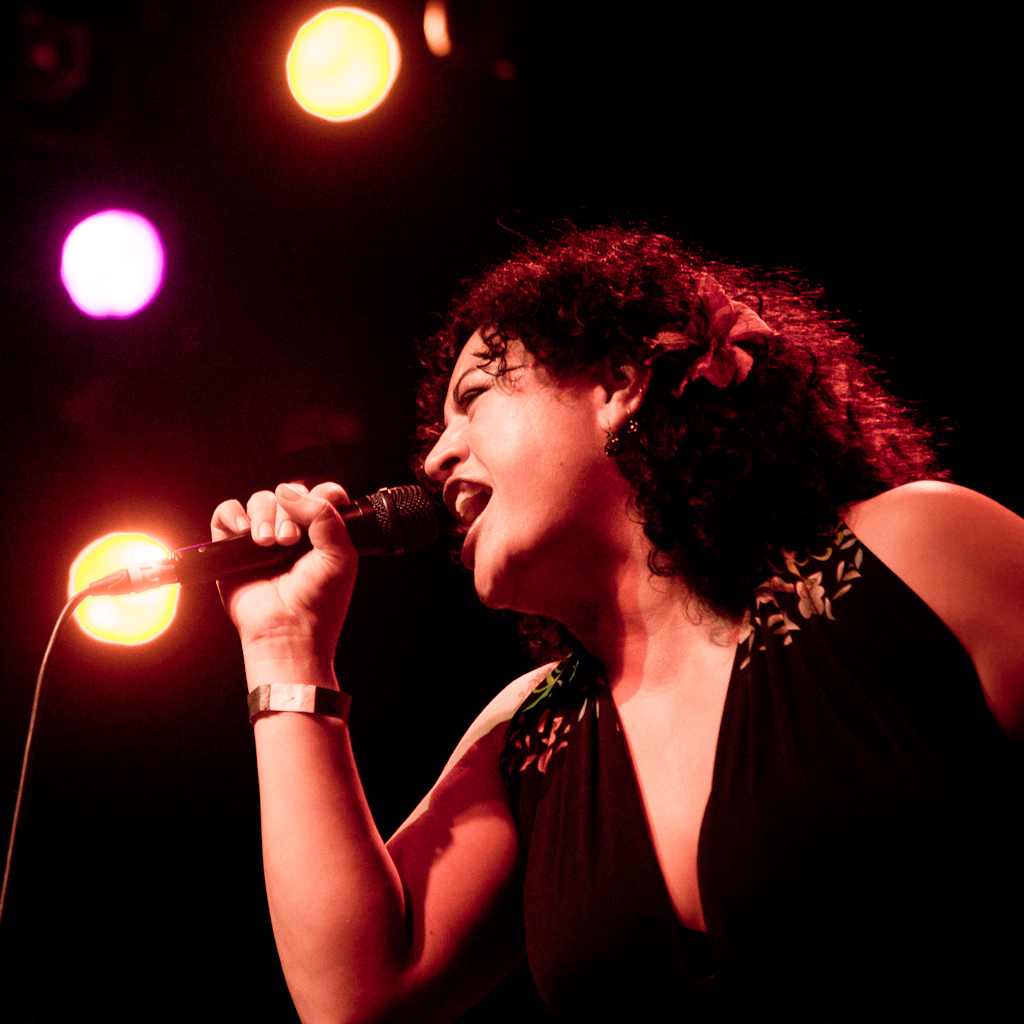
Kylie Auldist performing with The Bamboos at Manning Bar, Sydney, Australia

The Bamboos debut studio album, Step It Up, was released by Tru Thoughts in 2006. The 11-track album included 9 instrumentals and two vocal tracks featuring Alice Russell. Step it Up received positive reviews within the Funk/Soul scene and enabled the band to embark upon their first headline Australian, U.K and European tour that year.

The Bamboos live show had evolved by this time into a non-stop "live mix"-style set where each song segued into the next. It was a format influenced by artists such as James Brown and Breakestra. The album title track "Step It Up" gained visibility with its use in high-rating U.S TV shows Grey's Anatomy and Ugly Betty. Melbourne vocalist Kylie Auldist officially joined the band full-time in 2006 debuting on stage at Meredith Music Festival.

In 2007, The Bamboos released their second studio album Rawville, which marked a stylistic move towards more vocal-based material and featured vocalists Kylie Auldist, Tyra Hammond, Fallon Williams and Ohmega Watts. Rawville was described by UK-based IDJ Magazine as "arguably the best funk album of the modern era". The band embarked on another tour that encompassed Australia and Europe.

In 2008, The Bamboos released their third studio album, Side-Stepper. The album included contributions from guest vocalists Megan Washington, Paul Macinnes and TY. Side-Stepper featured the singles "King of the Rodeo" and "I Can't Help Myself", which was nominated in the Blues & Roots Work of the Year category in the APRA Music Awards of 2010. Original band member keyboardist Ben Grayson left the band at this point and was replaced by Dustin Mclean.

Later in 2008, The Bamboos released a live album, Listen! Hear! The Bamboos Live!, compiled from shows during a week-long residency with The Cat Empire at The Metro Theatre in Sydney.

=== 2010–2014: 4, Medicine Man and Fever in the Road ===
In 2010, The Bamboos released their fourth studio album, 4. Kano Hollamby produced the album cover artwork which depicts the band looking out of framed boxes, and two video clips were produced for the album's opening singles. The British Blues & Soul magazine called it "Simply Stunning" and "an instant classic". Once again, the band supported the album with an Australian and European tour. The song "On the Sly" was later used in a scene of the American film Crazy, Stupid, Love. "You Ain't No Good" featured on the US TV show Hellcats.

In 2012, The Bamboos released their fifth studio album, Medicine Man. The album consisted of 12 vocal tracks, featuring Kylie Auldist and guests including Aloe Blacc, Daniel Merriweather, Tim Rogers, Megan Washington, Bobby Flynn and Ella Thompson (the latter who would join the band as a full-time member in the same year). Current drummer Graeme Pogson replaced Daniel Farrugia in 2011. Medicine Man peaked at number 28 on the ARIA Charts. The album's lead single "I Got Burned" was the band's most commercially successful single to date, gaining crossover success with airplay on commercial stations such as Triple M and Nova and featured in the opening scene of successful Australian TV show House Husbands. The song would later rank at No. 54 on the Triple J Hottest 100, 2012. Medicine Man would go on to receive three ARIA Music Awards nominations at the ARIA Music Awards of 2012. They recorded a cover version of the Rolling Stones' "Can't You Hear Me Knocking" for Mojo Magazine (U.K) and released the free four-track EP Live at the Metro through their Facebook page in November 2012.

In late 2012, Ferguson rented a studio in the inner Western Melbourne suburb of Yarraville, where he co-wrote a new record with Thompson and Auldist. The album was co-produced with longtime Bamboos studio and live engineer John Castle, and had a dense, layered and 'darker' sound. Ferguson cited influences including the music of Stereolab, Beck and Tame Impala. Keyboardist Simon Mavin performed on the album, but would leave the band shortly after due to the burgeoning success of his group Hiatus Kaiyote. Luke Saunders joined on keyboards in mid-2013.

In November 2013, The Bamboos released their sixth studio album, Fever in the Road on Lance Ferguson's own label Pacific Theatre. The album peaked at number 41 on the ARIA Charts. Upon released, Ferguson stated in the press "The last record was so guest heavy that I felt compelled to make a record like this...I'm certainly not ruling out collaborating with other people in the future, but I just felt that the right thing to do now was to make the musical statement that this is the sound of The Bamboos."

Between recording Fever in the Road and its release, the band embarked upon a national Australian tour with vocalist Tim Rogers called The Rock 'n Soul Medicine Show. The tour capitalised upon the success of the "I Got Burned" single and also included re-arrangements of some You Am I (Rogers' band) songs alongside several new originals penned by Ferguson and Rogers. The two would continue their musical partnership in 2013 working on the Foxtel Studio Channel TV show Studio at the Memo, a music-oriented variety show with Rogers hosting and Ferguson acting as musical director.

In mid-2014, Ella Thompson left the band to pursue her solo career and other projects. "Avenger" was nominated at the APRA Music Awards of 2014 in the Blues & Roots Work of the Year category. Fever in the Road was nominated for Best Blues & Roots Album at the ARIA Music Awards of 2014.

=== 2015–2016: The Rules of Attraction and The Best of the Tru Thoughts Years ===
A full collaborative album with Tim Rogers entitled The Rules of Attraction was released on Atlantic Records on 22 May 2015. Recorded at both at The Shed Studios and Lance Ferguson's home studio, the album featured twelve songs co-written by Rogers and Ferguson. The album peaked at number 26 on the ARIA Charts. The album received 4-star reviews from Rolling Stone Magazine, The Age and The Sydney Morning Herald.

The Bamboos followed on from an Australian national tour in June with performances as house band on the ABC TV 'Saturday Night Crack Up TV Special hosted by Eddie Perfect, and the AFL Grand Final Eve Special Broadcast for Triple M. Celebrating the 15th Anniversary of the band, an official birthday show happened on 18 September 2015 to coincide with The Northcote Social Club's 10th anniversary. Guests on stage on the night included Remi, Bobby Flynn and previous Bamboos drummer Daniel Farrugia.

In November 2015, the compilation album The Best of the Tru Thoughts Years was released to coincide with the 15th anniversary of the band. The Rules of Attraction was nominated in the "Best Blues & Roots Album" category of ARIA Music Awards of 2015. "Easy" was nominated for Blues & Roots Work of the Year category at the APRA Music Awards of 2016.

=== 2017–2019: Night Time People and By Special Arrangement ===
In 2017, Lance Ferguson released his debut solo album Raw Material, while several band line-up changes occurred, with tenor saxophonist Damon Grant joining after Anton Delecca moved to New York. Keyboardist Luke Saunders also left and was replaced by Daniel Mougerman. Percussionist Phil Binotto joined in 2017 to expand the group to a 9-piece lineup.

In November 2017, the band released a cover version of The Easybeats hit "I'll Make You Happy", featuring vocalist Montaigne, as part of various artists' Easybeats tribute Rebeat.

On 20 February 2018, The Bamboos released their first new original music in nearly three years with the single "Lit Up", which was accompanied by a video clip directed by Chris Nelius. The song was mixed by the legendary recording engineer Bob Clearmountain. The band secured the opening support slot for Robbie Williams' Heavy Entertainment Show Australian Tour, performing to their largest audiences ever in arena concerts in the countries capital cities. On 6 July 2018, The Bamboos released their eighth studio album Night Time People, which received a 5-star reviews from the UK's Daily Mirror and Blues & Soul magazine. The Age called it "instantly addictive" and Rolling Stone proclaimed its "undeniable Soul charms".

The Bamboos spent the beginning of 2019 in the studio recording their 9th studio album. The first single from the new album was an orchestral ballad take on the song "I Never" featuring Dan Sultan on vocals (originally performed by Daniel Merriweather on the Medicine Man album). It was premiered on Double J. The next singles "Stop" and "I Got Burned" were accompanied by live performance video clips filmed in a church hall in Carlton. By Special Arrangement was released on 2 August 2019. It featured eight newly recorded orchestral re-works of previously released songs, along with two new cover versions. Long-time band member Ross Irwin (trumpet) arranged the material. It was launched with a live performance at Melbourne Recital Centre with the band accompanied by a 10-piece string section. Beat Magazine in their review of the show proclaimed that "The Bamboos are quickly becoming national treasures of the Australian music industry".

=== 2020–2022: Hard Up and Live at Hamer Hall ===
In October 2019 the band had set up recording equipment in a country house in the Victorian town of Lancefield, spending seven days recording the bulk of the material that would become their tenth studio album Hard Up. Long-time Bamboos recording engineer John Castle was enlisted to track the sessions, which ran through night and day across the week. On recording the album, Ferguson said: "We converted the lounge room into the rhythm section’s room, the horns were in the dining room, the control room was in one of the bedrooms…And we took the MO of going song by song. Everyone was in there working together, and we just threw everything we could at a song until we got it to a point that we felt we all liked. It was a much nicer way to do it."

The album was slated for release in mid-2020 to coincide with The Bamboos' 20th Anniversary, but the COVID-19 pandemic halted all touring opportunities throughout the year and the album release was subsequently pushed back to 2021. Between the ensuing two extended Melbourne lockdowns the group recorded additional material for the record. The band released three singles during 2020, including the album's title track "Hard Up", which featured a video clip shot during lockdown at each separate band members home.

To celebrate their 20th anniversary a special 2×7" gatefold vinyl single featuring four back catalogue songs was released on 29 August as an official Record Store Day 2020 release.

11 March 2021 marked a return to the stage with two performances alongside The Melbourne Symphony Orchestra at Hamer Hall in Melbourne. The group played songs from across their two decade-long career, arranged by band member trumpeter/arranger Ross Irwin and featuring the full 50-piece orchestra. Tim Rogers performed "I Got Burned" on the second night. The concerts were recorded and performances compiled from the two nights would go on to make up the Live at Hamer Hall live album, released in December 2022. The band broadcast a live-streamed show from the Corner Hotel, with a limited venue capacity on 25 April 2021.

The Hard Up album was released on 7 May 2021 on Pacific Theatre/BMG. Its eleven tracks marked a stylistic shift back to the Bamboos's earlier Deep Funk and Soul influences. Kylie Auldist performed vocals on seven songs and guest vocalists Durand Jones, Joey Dosik and Ev Jones performed on the remaining three tracks. Blues & Soul gave it a 4-star review and Echoes called it "One of their best". It was feature album on PBS 106.7FM and debuted at number 13 on the ARIA Vinyl Albums Chart. Hard Up would go on to receive nominations at the 2022 ARIA Music Awards, APRA Music Awards of 2022 and the 2021 Music Victoria Awards.

In August 2021 an official deluxe edition of the Hard Up album was announced, which featured 6 previously unreleased songs recorded during the 2019 "Lancefield Sessions". The band rounded out the year with a performance at Out of the Woods Festival and a New Years Eve show in Byron Bay.

2022 saw the Bamboos finally complete the official 'Hard Up' Australian national tour, which had been postponed several times due to pandemic lockdowns and venue capacity restrictions over the previous two years. The band played headline shows in Melbourne, Sydney, Adelaide and Brisbane. As the live music scene gained momentum again, they performed extensively in 2022 at venues, events and festivals including Byron Bay Bluesfest, Queenscliff Music Festival, Melbourne Jazz Festival, Esplanade Hotel, Melbourne, The Big Bonanza, St Kilda Festival, Vine Hop Festival and the Tasmanian Wine Festival.

The Live at Hamer Hall album was released in December 2022. It featured ten songs compiled from the two performances with The Melbourne Symphony Orchestra in 2020. Blues & Soul called it "a bold, brassy and extremely ambitious affair". Ferguson said of the performance: "It truly felt like a once-in-a-lifetime experience. Melbournians had just emerged from the city's first major lockdown, the gift of seeing and playing live music again seemed to carry extra weight for everyone in the room. All of the raw emotion in the room...galvanised the band and the audience to make these shows count”.

=== 2023: This Is How You Do It ===
The Bamboos began 2023 with performances in the Caribbean on the ocean-going Jam Cruise festival, alongside George Porter Jr., Cymande, John Medeski and others. Rita Satch and Kate Ferguson were added to the live line up as a backing vocal section. The single "Ex-Files" was released on 4 August, with a new full-length studio album This Is How You Do It (the band's 11th studio album) announced for release on 3 November. The Bamboos also announced a European/UK tour to accompany the release of the new album in November.

== Band members ==
Current members

- Lance Ferguson – guitar (2000–present)
- Kylie Auldist – vocals (2006–present)
- Graeme Pogson – drums (2011–present)
- Yuri Pavlinov – bass (2002–present)
- Ross Irwin – trumpet, tambourine (2003–present)
- Phil Noy – Tenor & baritone saxophone (2007–present)
- Daniel Mougerman – Hammond organ (2017–present)
- Phil Binotto – percussion (2017–present)
- Rita Satch – backing vocals (2023–present)
- Kate Ferguson – backing vocals (2023–present)

Former members

- Damon Grant – Tenor saxophone, flute (2017–2024)
- Anton Delecca – Tenor saxophone, flute (2004–2017)
- Luke Saunders – Hammond organ (2013–2017)
- Ella Thompson – vocals (2012–2014)
- Simon Mavin – Hammond organ (2012–2013)
- Ben Grayson – Hammond organ (2000–2008, 2011–2012)
- Stevie Hesketh – Hammond organ (2009–2010)
- Dustin McLean – Hammond organ (2008–2009)
- Bruce Sandell – Tenor saxophone, flute (2003–2004)
- Danny Farrugia – drums (2004–2011)
- Jamie Jones – drums (2003–2004)
- Scott Lambie – drums (2000–2003)
- Stuart Speed – bass (2000–2003)

== Discography ==
Studio albums

- Step It Up (2006)
- Rawville (2007)
- Side-Stepper (2008)
- 4 (2010)
- Medicine Man (2012)
- Fever in the Road (2013)
- The Rules of Attraction (with Tim Rogers) (2015)
- Night Time People (2018)
- By Special Arrangement (2019)
- Hard Up (2021)
- This Is How You Do It (2023)
- The Bamboos Best (2025)

== Awards and nominations ==
=== APRA Awards ===
The APRA Awards are held in Australia and New Zealand by the Australasian Performing Right Association to recognise songwriting skills, sales and airplay performance by its members annually.

| Year | Nominee / work | Award | Result |
|---|---|---|---|
| 2010 | "I Can't Help Myself" | Blues & Roots Work of the Year | Nominated |
| 2013 | "I Got Burned" (Lance Ferguson) | Song of the Year | Shortlisted |
| 2014 | "Avenger" (Lance Ferguson / Ella Thompson) | Blues & Roots Work of the Year | Nominated |
| 2014 | "Avenger" (Lance Ferguson / Ella Thompson) | Song of the Year | Shortlisted |
| 2016 | "Easy" | Blues & Roots Work of the Year | Nominated |
| 2022 | "Power Without Greed" | Most Performed Blues and Roots Work | Nominated |

=== ARIA Music Awards ===
The ARIA Music Awards are a series of annual ceremonies presented by the Australian Recording Industry Association (ARIA) since 1987. The Bamboos have been nominated for seven Aria Awards.

| Year | Nominee / work | Award | Result |
|---|---|---|---|
| 2012 | The Bamboos – Medicine Man Tour | Best Australian Live Act | Nominated |
| 2012 | Medicine Man | Best Independent Release | Nominated |
| 2012 | Medicine Man | Best Urban Album | Nominated |
| 2014 | Fever in the Road | Best Blues & Roots Album | Nominated |
| 2015 | The Rules of Attraction (with Tim Rogers) | Best Blues & Roots Album | Nominated |
| 2022 | Hard Up | Best Blues & Roots Album | Nominated |
| 2023 | Live At Hamer Hall With The Melbourne Symphony Orchestra | Best Blues & Roots Album | Nominated |

=== EG Awards/Music Victoria Awards ===
The Music Victoria Awards (previously known as The Age EG Awards and The Age Music Victoria Awards) are an annual awards night celebrating Victorian music.

| Year | Nominee / work | Award | Result | Ref. |
|---|---|---|---|---|
| 2012 | "I Got Burned" (featuring Tim Rogers) | Best Song | Nominated | |
| 2014 | Fever in the Road | Best Soul, Funk, R'n'B and Gospel Album | Nominated | |
| 2015 | The Bamboos | Best Live Act | Nominated | |
| 2018 | Night Time People | Best Soul, Funk, R'n'B and Gospel Album | Nominated | |
| 2021 | Hard Up | Best Soul, Funk, R'n'B and Gospel Album | Nominated | |

=== National Live Music Awards ===
The National Live Music Awards (NLMAs) are a broad recognition of Australia's diverse live industry, celebrating the success of the Australian live scene. The awards commenced in 2016.

| Year | Nominee / work | Award | Result |
|---|---|---|---|
| 2018 | The Bamboos | Live R&B or Soul Act of the Year | Nominated |
