= The Switch (2010 film) =

2010 film by Josh Gordon and Will Speck

- Theatrical release poster
- Directed by: Will Speck Josh Gordon
- Screenplay by: Allan Loeb
- Based on: "Baster" by Jeffrey Eugenides
- Produced by: Albert Berger; Ron Yerxa
- Starring: Jennifer Aniston; Jason Bateman; Patrick Wilson; Jeff Goldblum; Juliette Lewis
- Cinematography: Jess Hall
- Edited by: John Axelrad
- Music by: Alex Wurman
- Production companies: Mandate Pictures; Echo Films
- Distributed by: Miramax Films
- Release dates: August 16, 2010 (ArcLight Hollywood); August 20, 2010 (United States)
- Running time: 101 minutes
- Country: United States
- Language: English
- Budget: $19 million
- Box office: $49.9 million

The Switch is a 2010 American romantic comedy film directed by Will Speck and Josh Gordon. Based on a screenplay written by Allan Loeb, the film, formerly titled The Baster, was inspired by the short story "Baster" by Jeffrey Eugenides. This was originally published in The New Yorker in 1996. The film stars Jennifer Aniston, Jason Bateman, and Thomas Robinson; Patrick Wilson, Juliette Lewis, and Jeff Goldblum appear in supporting roles.

Filming began and took place in 2009. Upon its release, The Switch received mixed reviews from critics, who praised its premise and the performances of its cast, but felt that the plot was formulaic.

This was the final film produced by Miramax Films during the Disney ownership before Disney sold Miramax to Filmyard Holdings on December 3, 2010.

== Plot ==
In her thirties, Kassie Larson is single, has not found love yet, and decides she wants to have a baby. Despite the objections of her long-time best friend Wally Mars, she chooses to do so alone because she cannot wait any longer. She also wants a face-to-face sperm donor, disdaining using a sperm bank.

Wally suggests he be the donor, but Kassie believes he is too neurotic, pessimistic, and self-absorbed. Since they are best friends, she thinks "That would be weird." He has always had feelings for Kassie, and they dated six years ago. His friend Leonard points out he missed his chance when she relegated him to the "friend zone."

Kassie selects Roland Nilson as her sperm donor; he is a handsome, charming, and married assistant professor at Columbia University. She organizes an "insemination party", where Wally meets Roland and takes an instant dislike to him. Roland produces his sperm in the bathroom, leaving it in a sample cup. Wally uses the bathroom and sees the sample. Drunk, he plays with the cup and accidentally spills it into the sink. Panicking, he replaces the sperm with his own.

The next day at work, still hungover, Wally remembers nothing. The insemination is successful and Kassie becomes pregnant. He is upset when she says that she is returning to her childhood hometown in Minnesota, as she thinks it would be a better place to raise a child than New York City. Kassie leaves, and Wally sinks into a dreary period.

Seven years later, Kassie returns to New York with Sebastian, her precocious and neurotic six-year-old. She wants to reconnect with Wally and eagerly introduces her boy to him. Wally eventually bonds with Sebastian. Roland is in the picture as he got divorced, and Kassie has started dating him. She believes he is Sebastian's biological father and the relationship might work.

Wally notices the strong similarities between him and Sebastian and realizes the result of the switch seven years earlier. Just before Roland proposes to Kassie, Wally reveals to her that Sebastian is his biological son, and he loves her. Shocked and angry about the switch, she rejects him.

After some time passes, Wally finds Kassie waiting for him one day after he leaves work. She says that Sebastian really misses and needs him. He misses and needs Sebastian, too. Kassie says she is no longer with Roland and has realized she loves Wally, so he proposes. The final scene shows a happily married Wally and Kassie giving Sebastian an eighth birthday party.

== Cast ==
- Jennifer Aniston as Kassie Larson
- Jason Bateman as Wally Mars
- Thomas Robinson as Sebastian Larson
  - Bryce Robinson as older Sebastian
- Patrick Wilson as Roland Nilson
- Juliette Lewis as Debbie Epstein
- Jeff Goldblum as Leonard
- Caroline Dhavernas as Pauline
- Scott Elrod as Teddy Declan
- Diane Sawyer as herself (cameo)

== Production ==
Aniston revealed in the DVD "extras" that she had known Bateman since she was 25, and the producers and directors noted their good chemistry in working together.

== Release ==
The film was released on August 20, 2010, in the United States by Walt Disney Studios Motion Pictures.

=== Critical reception ===
The review aggregator website Rotten Tomatoes reported that 53% of critics gave the film a positive rating, based on 156 reviews, with an average score of 5.20/10. Its consensus states "The Switch has an interesting premise and a charming cast; unfortunately, it also has a trite script that hews too close to tired rom-com formulas." On Metacritic, which uses a normalized rating system, the film holds a 52/100 rating, based on 30 reviews, indicating "mixed or average reviews". Aniston was nominated for a Razzie Award for Worst Actress for her performance in the film.

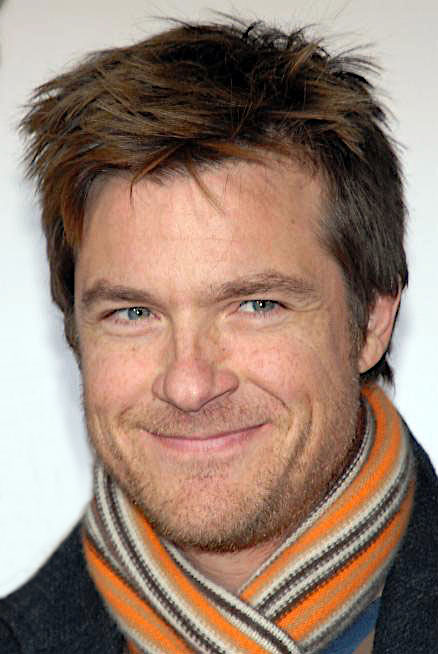
Jason Bateman was praised by critics for his performance.

Ann Hornaday, writing for The Washington Post gave The Switch three out of four stars. She wrote, "This disarmingly winning comedy turns into a warm, quirkily observant film, strengthened by some appealing performances and a low-key, easygoing vibe. Less reminiscent of the dreadful comedy The Back-up Plan than 2002's lovely About a Boy, this adaptation of a Jeffrey Eugenides story takes viewers down a path that, while by no means of least resistance, possesses a gratifying share of surprises." Los Angeles Times author Betsy Sharkey noted that the film "is what you might call a Bate-and-switch affair. More his journey than hers, more satire than slapstick, the film is that rare example of rom-com about men, which turns out to be a nice switch indeed." She also compared it to About a Boy and Lisa Cholodenko's 2010 film The Kids Are All Right, adding: "Though the film never quite rises to the level of either, the filmmakers show enough restraint to keep things interesting, Aniston and Bateman keep things both light and dark when they should, and Robinson's Sebastian steals everyone's heart."

Michael Phillips of the Chicago Tribune remarked that while "Jennifer Aniston gets top billing, the character played by Jason Bateman sets the tone." He found that "around the halfway point it starts getting interesting and the people who put it together are at least working in a realm of reasonable intelligence and wit and respect for the audience. I wish it were great, but 'pretty good' puts it ahead of plenty of recent romantic comedies." Similarly, Andrew O'Hehir from Salon.com wrote, "here comes the surprise: It's peculiar and pretty good! Taken on its own terms, it's a light, sweet, curiously enjoyable misfit romance, whose real star is not Aniston but her magnificently awkward Lothario, Jason Bateman." Owen Gleiberman from Entertainment Weekly gave the film a B rating and called it "a pleasant surprise. It's a by-the-numbers movie, but the dots that get connected feel new."

Less enthusiastic with the film, Detroit News's Tom Long wrote that "it's not a bad film, really, just sort of average. But Bateman is so good in it – natural, funny, yet full of real emotion – that you immediately want to see him again in a better film." Barely impressed, Joe Neumaier of New York Daily News called the film a "Judd Apatow lite, Farrelly brothers special blend. Just call it When Harry Met Sally... and Her Ovum. Andrew Barker from Variety felt that The Switch was "an unfunny, manipulative romance about two unlikable people and their prop of a son [...] The pic mangles the premise of its source material."

=== Commercial success ===
Even though it gained mixed reviews from critics, The Switch proved to be a moderate financial success. Budgeted at $19 million, it grossed $49.8 million worldwide, 55.7% of which came from its domestic run. 91 days in US theatres, it opened in 2,012 theaters and was ranked seventh after its opening weekend, averaging $4,193 per venue. On January 18, 2011, Maple Pictures released the film on DVD and Blu-ray in Canada, while Lionsgate released it in the United States on March 15, 2011. It grossed $7.7 million in US DVD sales.

=== Accolades ===
Awards
Year	Award	Category	Recipient	Result
2011	Women's Image Network Awards	Actress Feature Film	Jennifer Aniston	Nominated

== Remake ==
The Switch loosely inspired the 2025 Tamil language film Kadhalikka Neramillai, starring Ravi Mohan and Nithya Menen.

== Soundtrack ==
The Switch

Soundtrack album by Various Artists
- Released: August 17, 2010
- Genre: Film soundtrack
- Label: Rhino

Track listing
No.	Title	Singer(s)	Length
1.	"Opening Titles"	Alex Wurman	1:54
2.	"Instant Replay"	Dan Hartman	3:25
3.	"Freakshow on the Dance Floor"	The Bar-Kays	6:34
4.	"I Can't Wait" (edited version)	Nu Shooz	3:40
5.	"The Bomb (These Sounds Fall Into My Mind)" (Pop Radio Mix)	Sunrider	2:43
6.	"Here Comes the Sun"	Fat Larry's Band	5:22
7.	"Pushin' On" (featuring Alice Russell)	Quantic Soul Orchestra	3:19
8.	"Little L"	Jamiroquai	3:57
9.	"Lice"	Alex Wurman	2:49
10.	"Open Your Heart"	Lavender Diamond	3:11
11.	"Sea Green, See Blue"	Jaymay	6:17
12.	"Bluebird of Happiness" (Ulrich Schnauss Remix)	Mojave 3	9:56
13.	"All the Beautiful Things"	Eels	2:22
14.	"Numbered Days"	Eels	3:42
15.	"Lovers' Carvings"	Bibio	3:54
