= Mishaps Happening =

Studio album by Quantic
- Released: June 29, 2004
- Recorded: September 2003 – January 2004
- Genre: Funk, soul, electronica
- Length: 65:24
- Label: Tru Thoughts
- Producer: Quantic

Quantic chronology
Apricot Morning (2002)	Mishaps Happening (2004)	Pushin' On (2005)

Mishaps Happening is an album by Quantic, released in 2004.

== Track listing ==
1. Mishaps Happening – 7:32
2. Use What You Got (feat. Sonny Akpan) – 5:13
3. Sound of Everything (feat. Alice Russell) – 4:02
4. En Focus (feat. Trinidad) – 4:34
5. Trees and Seas – 4:53
6. Angels and Albatrosses – 5:13
7. Furthest Moment – 5:34
8. Don't Joke With a Hungry Man (feat. Spanky Wilson) – 5:18
9. Prelude to Happening – 6:25
10. When You're Through (feat. Spanky Wilson)– 4:38
11. Perception – 4:44
12. So Long (feat. Alice Russell) – 7:23
