= An Announcement to Answer =

Studio album by Quantic
- Released: July 26, 2006
- Genres: Funk, soul, breakbeat
- Length: 38:31
- Labels: Tru Thoughts (UK), Ubiquity (US)

Quantic chronology
Pushin' On (2005)	An Announcement to Answer (2006)	I'm Thankful (Spanky Wilson & The Quantic Soul Orchestra) (2006)

Professional ratings
Review scores
Source	Rating
Allmusic	4/5 stars
Okayplayer	3.5/5 stars
Tiny Mix Tapes	3.5/5 stars

An Announcement to Answer is Quantic's fourth album.

== Track listing ==
1. "Absence Heard, Presence Felt" - 3:07
2. "An Announcement To Answer" - 4:53
3. "Blow Your Horn" - 4:21
4. "Bomb In A Trumpet Factory" - 2:44
5. "Politick Society" - 4:40
6. "Meet Me At The Pomegranate Tree" - 2:50
7. "Sabor" - 6:59
8. "Ticket to Know Where" - 4:06
9. "Tell It Like You Mean It" - 4:51
