= Hint (musician) =

English musician

Jonathan James, popularly known as Hint, is a musician hailing from Sussex in the UK. His music has been released on independent record labels and his catalogue includes work which has found favour amongst DJs and fans from various underground music scenes.

== Early career ==
Hint's first releases were on the Deep Water label - an imprint based in Leicester in the UK. Shortly after the first promos of his debut EP Beau Selector were circulated amongst DJs, Hint was invited to record a Peel Session at the BBC's Maida Vale Studios, which was broadcast in May 2002.

Hint subsequently signed to Bristol-based label Hombre Recordings and began work on his debut album Portakabin Fever. The album was so called because it was written and recorded in a mobile home by James using an Akai MPC, guitar, bass and keyboards. The songs were then mixed with engineer 7-Stu-7 at State of Art - the Bristol-based studio owned by Geoff Barrow of Portishead. Once the album was complete, including cover art and a comic booklet by graphic artist Will Barras, it was released worldwide on 22 April 2003 by Hombre Recordings in association with another, larger independent record label - Ninja Tune.

Several of the songs from Portakabin Fever have appeared on television, including uses as incidental music in shows such as Top Gear, C.S.I. Miami and Location, Location, Location and uses in advertising for brands such as Britvic's J2O and Whittaker's Chocolate.

To support the release of the album, Hint toured Europe as a DJ with Hexstatic and Pest. At 2003's Big Chill music festival Hint was joined on stage by Bonobo on bass and Minotaur Shock on drums, the trio performing under the banner "The Hint Touring Band". Both artists also contributed remixes to Hint's track "Count Your Blessings".

From 2004 until 2008 Hint was also a member of the Futureboogie collective, DJing as a resident at their Seen club nights in Bristol and London and regularly contributing to their internet radio shows.

== Recent career ==
After Hombre Recordings ceased operation, Hint signed to Brighton label Tru Thoughts. Drawing on his love of Drum and Bass, House and Hip Hop, Hint's releases for the label took a more energetic, bass-heavy direction.

The release in 2008 of Hint's second album Driven From Distraction saw him collaborate for the first time in the studio with vocalists and other musicians, including (on the song "Muddled Morning") a 15-year-old MC called Rizzle, who later went on to find success in the group Rizzle Kicks. "Snake Patrol" also features a recording of actor Gavin Stenhouse playing guitar.

Hint has continued to explore a more dancefloor-focused direction with remixes for label mates Belleruche, Flevans, Hot 8 Brass Band and Maddslinky and released his third album, Daily Intake, in 2012.

== Discography ==
=== Albums ===
- Portakabin Fever - 22 April 2003
- Driven From Distraction - 28 July 2008
- Daily Intake - 19 March 2012

=== EPs and singles ===
- The Beau Selectah EP - 2002
- Count Your Blessings single - 7 September 2002
- You Little Trooper single - 18 November 2002
- Quite Spectacular single - 17 February 2003
- Count Your Blessings (Remixes) single - 15 September 2003
- The Tremmuh EP - 12 December 2005
- At The Dance EP - 12 December 2007
- Driven From Distraction EP - 21 July 2008
- CMONSTEP / One Woman Army Remixes EP - 26 May 2009
- Laboratory Series No.1: Beryllium EP - 30 August 2010
- Crash and Burn / Aliens Enter single - 30 January 2012
