= Apricot Morning =

Studio album by Quantic
- Released: June 25, 2002
- Recorded: 2001–2002
- Genre: Funk, soul, electronica
- Length: 57:29
- Label: Tru Thoughts

Quantic chronology
The 5th Exotic (2001)	Apricot Morning (2002)	Mishaps Happening (2004)

Apricot Morning is the second album by Quantic, released on June 25, 2002.

== Track listing ==
1. Apricot Morning – 6:26
2. Transatlantic – 4:43
3. Brand New Watusi (featuring EQ) – 6:01
4. Search the Heavens – 5:53
5. Wider than the Sky – 3:55
6. Primate Boogaloo (featuring Aspects) – 3:35
7. Blackstone Rock – 4:10
8. Sweet Calling (featuring Alice Russell) – 4:43
9. Trouble From The River – 6:26
10. Not So Blue – 5:07
11. Off the Beaten Track – 3:30
