= Look Around the Corner =

Studio album by Quantic & Alice Russell with the Combo Bárbaro
- Released: 20 February 2012
- Genre: Soul, latin jazz, funk
- Length: 52:34
- Label: Tru Thoughts
- Producer: Will Holland

Quantic chronology
| Dog With a Rope (Quantic pres. Flowering Inferno) (2010) | Look Around the Corner (2012) | Magnetica (2014) |

Professional ratings
Aggregate scores
| Source | Rating |
|---|---|
| Metacritic | 83/100 |
Review scores
| Source | Rating |
| PopMatters | 8/10 |
| Allmusic | 3.5/5 stars |

Look Around the Corner is an album by Quantic (Will Holland) and Alice Russell, recorded and produced by Holland in his studio in Cali, Colombia, and released in 2012 on Tru Thoughts. The production was granted by the PRS for Music Foundation. The title track "Look Around the Corner" was released up front as 10" single, and was added to the daily rotation play list of BBC 6Music. Louis Pattison entitled his review for the BBC "An exceptional collaboration – like manna from heaven for leftfield soul fans", characterising it as "mixing warm, brassy funk and soul grooves with Latin jazz and cumbia, it's a soft sort of fusion, mixing flavours with a lightness of touch."

== Track listing ==
| No. | Title | Length |
|---|---|---|
| 1. | "Look Around the Corner" | 4:28 |
| 2. | "Here Again" | 4:06 |
| 3. | "Traveling Song" | 4:44 |
| 4. | "Magdalena" | 3:25 |
| 5. | "I'll Keep My Light in My Window" | 5:41 |
| 6. | "Una tarde en Mariquita" | 5:55 |
| 7. | "Interlude" | 0:36 |
| 8. | "Su Suzy" | 5:04 |
| 9. | "Boogaloo 33" | 3:45 |
| 10. | "Road to Islay" | 3:08 |
| 11. | "Similau" | 2:04 |
| 12. | "I'd Cry" | 7:11 |
| 13. | "Magdalena (Reprise)" | 2:08 |
| 14. | "Look Around the Corner (Reprise)" | 0:19 |
