= Here Comes the Boom =

2012 film by Frank Coraci

- Theatrical release poster
- Directed by: Frank Coraci
- Written by: Allan Loeb; Kevin James
- Produced by: Todd Garner; Kevin James
- Starring: Kevin James; Salma Hayek; Henry Winkler
- Cinematography: Phil Méheux
- Edited by: Scott Hill
- Music by: Rupert Gregson-Williams
- Production companies: Columbia Pictures; Happy Madison Productions; Hey Eddie Productions; Broken Road Productions
- Distributed by: Sony Pictures Releasing
- Release date: October 12, 2012
- Running time: 105 minutes
- Country: United States
- Language: English
- Budget: $42 million
- Box office: $73.1 million

Here Comes the Boom is a 2012 American martial arts sports comedy film directed by Frank Coraci, written by Allan Loeb and Kevin James, and produced by James and Todd Garner. It stars James as a biology teacher who attempts to save his school's music program by becoming an MMA fighter. The film co-stars Henry Winkler, Salma Hayek, and Joe Rogan.

Produced by Adam Sandler's production company Happy Madison Productions in association with Garner's Broken Road Productions and James' Hey Eddie, Here Comes the Boom was released in the United States on October 12, 2012, by Columbia Pictures. The film's title is taken from the song "Boom" by Christian nu-metal band P.O.D. The film received mixed reviews and grossed $73.1 million worldwide.

== Plot ==
Former Division I collegiate wrestler Scott Voss is a 42-year-old bored and disillusioned biology teacher at the failing Wilkinson High School. Budget cutbacks at the school jeopardize the continuation of its music program, which would result in its teacher, Marty Streb, being laid off. Concerned for both his colleague and his students, Scott attempts to raise the $48,000 necessary to keep the music program. He moonlights as a night instructor for an adult citizenship class, where student Niko requests outside tutoring. When Scott arrives at Niko's apartment, he learns that Niko is a former MMA fighter. While watching the UFC at Niko's apartment, Scott learns that the loser of a fight receives $10,000, which gives him the idea of raising the money by fighting and losing in MMA.

Scott, helped by Niko and Marty, begins with small unsanctioned bouts paying only $750 to the loser. Niko begins training him in defense, later adding trainer Mark to teach offense, after Scott knocks out opponent "Lucky" Patrick Murray and realizes that wins give larger payouts, needing fewer fights to achieve his goal. While Marty trains with Scott, Malia De La Cruz, one of Scott's students and a band member, helps Niko study for his citizenship test by putting the information into songs. Scott then begins fighting in small MMA fights and gradually gains greater amounts of money for the school.

Scott has been pursuing the school nurse, Bella Flores, and they share moments flirting with each other while also rekindling Scott's passion for teaching. He begins to engage the class and earns the respect of his students. Scott is within $6,000 of his goal when Mark tells him that Niko turned down a sanctioned UFC fight offered by Joe Rogan, with the certainty of earning $10,000 for a loss. Scott confronts Niko, who apologizes and admits he turned it down because he was jealous as he was once asked to fight at the UFC but suffered a neck injury while training, ending his career. Scott and Niko accept the offer, and they travel to the MGM Grand Las Vegas for the fight. The night he arrives, Bella calls Scott to tell him that the school's vice principal Robert Elkins has been arrested for embezzling from the school, including Scott's winnings; all of Scott's efforts will be in vain unless he wins the fight and the $50,000.

The publicity of Scott's rise to fame has grown, and the school's band appears in the stands to play his theme song, "Holly Holy" by Neil Diamond, thanks to Bella contacting Rogan. During the fight, Marty reminds the losing Scott that even if he does not win, he has inspired the students, which is their real purpose as teachers. Scott has no answer to his dangerous opponent Ken Dietrich, who is angered that his original opponent canceled and that he is stuck with a man that "does not deserve" to be fighting at the UFC. Scott struggles to survive the first two rounds, but after finding inspiration from the students, he manages to win in the third and final round of the fight, earning $50,000 and Dietrich's respect. Scott and Bella kiss through the chain link fence of the ring.

In the closing scene, the music program is saved, the school is operating on a normal budget thanks to Scott's donation and Niko and all of the students in Scott's citizenship class attend their American citizenship ceremony where Niko gets sworn in as an American citizen.

== Cast ==
- Kevin James as Scott Voss
- Salma Hayek as Bella Flores
- Henry Winkler as Marty Streb
- Greg Germann as Duke Betcher
- Joe Rogan as Himself
- Jake Zyrus as Malia De La Cruz
- Bas Rutten as Niko
- Nikki Tyler-Flynn as Mollie Streb
- Reggie Lee as Mr. De La Cruz
- Jason Miller as "Lucky" Patrick Murray
- Mark Muñoz as Romero
- Melissa Peterman as Lauren Voss
- Shelly Desai as Miguel
- Bruce Buffer as Himself
- Krzysztof Soszynski as Ken "The Executioner" Dietrich
- Satoshi Ishii as Fairgrounds Fighter
- Mark DellaGrotte as Himself
- Herb Dean as Himself
- Mookie Barker as Vice Principal Elkins
- Mike Goldberg as Himself
- Wanderlei Silva as Himself
- Chael Sonnen as Arguing fighter
- Jacob "Stitch" Duran as Himself
- Melchor Menor as Sityodtong Gym Fighter
- Lenny Clarke as Loud Dietrich Fan

== Production ==
Filming began on March 28, 2011, in and around the Boston, Massachusetts, area. Filming continued on through May 25, 2011, in Lowell and Quincy, Massachusetts, where it wrapped shortly thereafter, by early June 2011.

== Music ==
- "Holly Holy" – versions by Neil Diamond and Jake Zyrus are heard in the film
- "Bouncing off the Ceiling (Upside Down)" by A-Teens
- "Joker & the Thief" by Wolfmother
- "Optimus Bellum Domitor" by Sak, Williams and Welch
- "Boom" by P.O.D.
- "Spank" by Jimmy "Bo" Horne
- "James Brown Is Dead" by L.A. Style
- "New Noise" by Refused
- "Holly Holy" by Neil Diamond
- "Faithfully" by Journey
- "Holly Holy (NSFW Remix)" by Neil Diamond ft. UltraLove
- "Pictures" by Joseph Anderson
- "I Stand Alone" by Godsmack
- "Doin' It Right (Delta Mix)" by Steve Azar

== Release ==
Here Comes the Boom was released on DVD in Region 1 in the United States on February 5, 2013, and also in Region 2 in the United Kingdom on 18 March 2013, by Sony Pictures Home Entertainment.

== Reception ==
=== Box office ===
In its opening weekend, the movie earned $11.8 million in the domestic box office and ended its box office run with $73 million worldwide.

=== Critical reception ===
On Rotten Tomatoes, the film holds a rating of 42% based on 96 reviews. The website's consensus reads, "Here Comes the Boom benefits from Kevin James's genial presence, but the film doesn't deliver enough laughs to live up to its title – or enough satisfying plot to make up the difference." On Metacritic, the film has a score of 40 out of 100, based on reviews from 26 critics, indicating "mixed or average" reviews. Audiences surveyed by CinemaScore gave the film an average grade of "A" on an A+ to F scale.

USA Today's Scott Bowles says the film "telegraphs every punch ... but when the comedy connects, it can deliver with funny force". He says, "The film suffers from too many side stories, but it does a nice job capturing the heavyweight battles of everyday folk." Michael Phillips of the Chicago Tribune writes: "Once it gets going and commits to its time-worn inspirational formula, it's not half-bad." Neil Genzlinger of The New York Times wrote: "If you can choke down the implausible notion that the doughy Kevin James would last more than five seconds in a mixed martial arts ring, Here Comes the Boom is a moderately enjoyable, nontaxing sort of comedy."

John Anderson of Variety magazine wrote: "Hands of stone meet heads of air in Here Comes the Boom, a sports story so daffy it may as well star Kevin James." He called the film "a triumph of recycling" comparing it to Rocky. Anderson is critical of the different clashing tones of the film, but calls the characters likable, and writes the "violence adds a frisson of tension to the pic’s mix of grappling, romance and anemic social critique." Entertainment Weekly's Lisa Schwarzbaum called it "A cloddish, harmlessly drecky comedy from the Sandler factory of crude mush." Nathan Rabin of The A.V. Club wrote: "Here Comes The Boom seems to have made it from the pitch stage - Kevin James does MMA to save his school or something! - to the big screen without an iota of inspiration, ambition, or personality seeping in at any juncture." Marc Savlov of the Austin Chronicle wrote: ""Here Comes the Bomb" would've been a more fitting title, but props to Henry Winkler for rising to the occasion and turning in a sweet, idealistic performance in a film that otherwise feels like a tawdry commercial for the UFC and MMA."

== Awards and nominations ==
Here Comes the Boom was chosen as one of ten best films for family audiences by the 21st Annual Movieguide Awards on February 15, 2013.
