= Blue Juice =

- DVD Artwork
- Directed by: Carl Prechezer
- Written by: Carl Prechezer; Peter Salmi; Tim Veglio
- Produced by: Simon Relph
- Starring: Sean Pertwee; Catherine Zeta-Jones; Steven Mackintosh; Ewan McGregor; Peter Gunn; Heathcote Williams
- Cinematography: Richard Greatrex
- Edited by: Michael Ellis
- Music by: Simon Davison
- Distributed by: FilmFour Distributors
- Release date: September 15, 1995
- Running time: 90 minutes
- Country: United Kingdom
- Language: English
- Budget: $3 million

Blue Juice is a 1995 British comedy drama film directed by Carl Prechezer and starring Sean Pertwee, Catherine Zeta-Jones, Ewan McGregor, and Steven Mackintosh. It follows JC (Pertwee) as he attempts to reconcile his surfer lifestyle and loser friends, with the pressure to grow up from his girlfriend (Jones). Blue Juice was set in Cornwall, and released in 1995 by FilmFour.

== Plot ==
JC is a respected surf instructor, approaching his 30th birthday and living in an idyllic Cornish village with long-term girlfriend Chloe. He is focused on a dream of travelling the world surfing, with Chloe. His old friends from London visit late one night on an impromptu stag-weekend, including the 'kidnapped' groom-to-be Terry, who being more sensible and staid than the others is considered 'boring' and in need of livening up. The arrival of his three friends exposes tensions in JC's relationship with Chloe, as she would prefer to buy the surf-shack café they work in rather than go around the world, and suspects that JC prefers the company of his friends over her. The friends are keen to tempt JC back into his old lifestyle, especially drug-dealing Dean. JC argues with both Chloe and his friends.

At a rave that Chloe has organised to quickly raise funds to buy the surf-shack, Dean is attacked by some unhappy customers he had swindled. JC finds him alone. Dean admits his life has gone off-track but suggests that JC could help him by agreeing to surf a dangerous reef called 'The Boneyard', to gain a story for Dean's hoped for new career in journalism; to secure this job, Dean needs to land a big story, preferably with a life-or-death situation. JC tells Dean that the last time he had surfed the reef it had nearly killed him, and that had been ten years ago when he was younger and fitter.

JC refuses to give in to Dean's pleas to surf 'The Boneyard', which prompts Dean to try it himself, as he has already arranged media coverage, with his boss watching. Dean fails in his attempt, hitting his head when smashed under by a huge wave. JC dives in to rescue Dean, successfully surfing the reef in the process, while saving Dean's life and job at the same time. Dean's boss gets knocked out by the local guru for his highly offensive attitude and remarks.

Terry – having earlier been tricked by Dean into taking drugs, and spray-painted himself silver to dance on a platform at the rave – has radically re-thought his life, and buys JC around-the-world tickets for him and Chloe. JC instead uses the money to buy the surf-shack café for Chloe and himself to run, deciding that his relationship is more important than impressing his friends.

== Cast ==
- Catherine Zeta-Jones as Chloe
- Sean Pertwee as J.C.
- Ewan McGregor as Dean Raymond
- Steven MacKintosh as Josh Tambini
- Peter Gunn as Terry Colcott

== Production ==
=== Casting ===
Blue Juice features an appearance from Jenny Agutter as a retired actress turned hotel proprietor Mary Fenton, who is famous for playing Guinevere in a fictional television show called Arthur's Knights.

The film also features soul singer Edwin Starr as a soul singer named Ossie Sands. The songs featured were recorded by Starr for the film. Continuing the Northern Soul theme, an appearance is made by legendary soul and funk DJ Keb Darge. He can be seen wearing a yellow top, dancing in the soul disco at the village hall. In the recording studio scene, the sound engineer is played by Paul Reynolds, whose largest role before Blue Juice was as Christopher Craig, the accomplice of Derek Bentley in the film Let Him Have It.

Keith Allen had a small part as Mike, a tabloid newspaper editor, who pays the Ewan McGregor character, Dean, for stories about record producer Josh.

The role of Shaper, played by Heathcote Williams, was also offered to Nigel Terry, best known for his portrayal of King Arthur in the 1981 John Boorman film, Excalibur.

Mark Frost, who played Moose, appeared in the 2008 ITV soap opera Echo Beach, also set on the Cornwall coast and featuring aspects of surf culture. Also part of the surfing crew was Cornish girl Andreya Wharry, who features throughout the film but is most prominently seen in the cafe scene where Josh tries to pay for Junior's food with his credit card. After Blue Juice, Wharry featured as a contestant on the TV show Gladiators, became a world top 10 kite surfer and set the world distance record for kite surfing, traveling from Cornwall to Ireland, in September 2005. Another surfer was played by Martin Dorey, author of The Campervan Cookbook and presenter of the BBC2 series One Man and His Campervan.

Chloe and JC's baby is played by Astrid Weguelin, the daughter of the film's make-up artist Kirstin Weguelin.

Professional surfer Steve England was a body double for Peter Gunn's character, Terry. To replicate Gunn's look and larger build he had to have his long hair cut and wear two wetsuits with towels packed around his stomach.

=== Filming locations ===
Most of the film is set in Cornwall and filmed there, many scenes are actually cut showing several different beaches and villages as if they were all adjoining, allowing the main parts of Cornwall to be incorporated into a single place. The main location of the Aqua Shack is in Mousehole cut into St Ives, while other locations in Cornwall included a rock high above Chapel Porth for the mystical seaweed scene, Godrevy, Newquay and St Ives for some of the street scenes. The scene filmed at the train station was in St. Erth, just outside Hayle. The map examined by JC, Josh and Dean whilst trying to work out where Terry has gone on the bike shows Godrevey Point and the B3301 road, a few miles north of Hayle. The scene where JC and Chloe argue through the windscreen of the van have is at Trevellas Porth Valley, also known as Blue Hills, between St. Agnes and Perranporth. The location of the second Aqua Shack is Kynance Cove Cafe, at Kynance Cove on Lizard Point. The outside of the hotel where Josh and Dean take Terry for the cream tea is the Tregenna Castle Hotel, however the inside scenes were filmed at the Pendley Manor Hotel in Tring (Hertfordshire), whilst the village hall scene was filmed at Rose Hill, just off Bunkers Hill in the Downalong area of St Ives.

The large wave and surfing sequences were filmed in Famara, Lanzarote, while a few close ups were filmed in a specialist wave pool, as shown in the documentary that accompanies the DVD release. Additional shots were filmed in London and at Pinewood Studios. In a 2008 interview with The Independent, Sean Pertwee stated that his favourite place in the British Isles was St. Agnes in Cornwall. "I spent a lot of time there when filming Blue Juice, which was about surfers. The walk along the top of the cliffs is beautiful."

=== Wardrobe and props ===
Many of the film's characters are dressed in clothing from the pressure group Surfers against Sewage. Many characters also wear the Australian surfwear label Mambo Graphics and Stüssy hats. Wetsuits used in the film and in publicity shots were manufactured by the Cornish Surf brand Gul. Other surf brands seen throughout the film, in the form of stickers or clothing, include Body Glove and Quiksilver.

Surfers Against Sewage stickers and posters are widely used throughout the film, visible in the Aqua Shack scenes and applied to the blue Bedford CF van driven by JC and Chloe for the surf school.

Pertwee used toupée tape to hold a sock in place, in the scene where JC appears nude apart from a black sock. "...I came up with this ingenious ploy - wrapping toupée tape on my chap. You won't believe how difficult it is to remove..." In a 1995 interview with FHM, Zeta-Jones recalled the filming of the sock scene; "It was a brown Marks & Spencer one, though. If it was a Stüssy one, or something like that, it might have been more interesting."

A reference is made in the film to the 1960s comic book character the Silver Surfer. On the way to find the rave, JC, Josh, Dean and Terry pass a man painted entirely in silver carrying a silver surfboard who waves at them. Terry, under the influence of drugs supplied by Dean, then copies this by painting himself silver.

The red and yellow ‘TASTY’ surfboard that Ewan McGregor used in the film, was sold at a film memorabilia auction in 2001 at Sotheby's in New York, to raise money for children born with Aids in Africa.

== Release ==
The film was the first release by FilmFour Distributors and opened in the United Kingdom on 15 September 1995 on 36 screens and grossed £55,516 in its opening weekend, finishing at number 12 at the UK box office.

=== DVD ===
For the 2000 DVD release, the DVD case artwork for the international market was redesigned with a picture of McGregor replacing Pertwee on the cover, even though McGregor had a smaller role. McGregor is depicted clean shaven and in a wetsuit, despite the fact his character in the film had a beard and long hair. Several reviewers and consumers picked up on this, including a review at www.dvdverdict.com which stated: "While it is perfectly understandable to attempt to sell the disc to consumers, it is questionable whether or not this marketing push steps over the line into disinformation."

A later release on DVD in 2004 reverted to the original artwork featuring Pertwee and Zeta-Jones, while a further release in 2008 saw the artwork entirely redesigned with FilmFour branding and a fresh image of Pertwee and Zeta-Jones.

== Soundtrack ==
- "Movin' On Up" performed by Edwin Starr (a cover of the Primal Scream song)
- "The Price of Pain" - performed by Edwin Starr
- "Freedom Bug" - performed by Heavy Stereo, written by Gem Archer
- "Get It On" - performed by Marc Bolan and T. Rex
- "Leave Them All Behind" - performed by Ride
- "Half the Man" - written and performed by Jamiroquai
- "Duel" - performed by Swervedriver
- "Lonely for You Baby" - performed by Sam Dees
- "I Need Something Stronger" - performed by Apollo 440
- "You're the One" - performed by Gillian Wisdom
- "You Were the Dream" - Roscoe Shelton

The original score in the film was written by Simon Davison.

The soundtrack has never been commercially available.
