= Pieces of a Man (band) =

British musical group

- Also known as: POAM
- Origin: Manchester, England
- Genres: Soul; future soul; hip hop soul; alternative R&B; neo-soul; funk; jazz; gospel; electronic
- Years active: 2013–present
- Label: Tru Thoughts
- Members: Illya "Pils" Gosling; David "DK" Klein; Tolu "To!u" Ajayi; Tim Curry; Mark Parkinson; Aden Peets
- Past members: Lauren Wright; Alec Stockton; Kelani Koyejo; Terry King; Jo Fidler (Lily-Jo); Caroline Gosling; Su Durant; Julie E Gordon; Pete Robinson
- Website: piecesofaman.org

Pieces of a Man are a musical group from Manchester, UK. The band's music is a blend of future soul, funk, hip hop, jazz, formed from a mix of live organic elements, loops and samples. They are signed to the Tru Thoughts record label and have released one studio album and one extended play recording since their signing in 2018.

== History ==
Pieces of a Man (POAM) was formed in early 2013 by musical director and producer Illya "Pils" Gosling, together with DJ and visual artist David "DK" Klein, together with keyboardist Pete Robinson (Riot Jazz) and four female vocalists; Julie E. Gordon, Jo Fidler, Su Durant and Caz Gosling. Pils coined the band name having been reminded of the Chicago jazz poet and "bluesologist" Gil Scott-Heron's death, and the band's musicality has paid homage to him throughout their career.

Tolu "To!u" Ajayi initially replaced one of the original four singers, later becoming frontman on departure of the other three vocalists in summer 2013. Tim Curry and Mark Parkinson joined the band. After the release of their debut mixtape the band were noticed and supported by several promoters including BBC Introducing, Mike Chadwick (Snarky Puppy) and Lubi Jovanovic (Soul Rebels). That same year POAM opened for neo-soul artists Bilal & Omar Lye-Fook.

In 2016, following their appearances on The Funk Apostles UK tour, POAM started to write and record demos for what would eventually become their debut album. A chance meeting between DK and producer Zed Bias in 2017 lead to Zed collaborating with the band to produce the record, ultimately leading to Tru Thoughts signing the band in 2018. In 2019, Pieces of a Man released Made In Pieces, and in 2020 the follow-up release Reframed EP, both records and associated singles signed to and distributed by Tru Thoughts.

Thematically, POAM's releases have centred around themes of relationship and identity; personal, political and intersectional. Pils is the principal songwriter for the band, with all six members listed with writing credits. To!u is an outspoken advocate for platforming LGBT+ people of colour, his contributions and lyricism often stem from his activism.

== Discography ==
=== Studio albums ===
Title	Details
Made in Pieces	Release date: 12 July 2019; Label: Tru Thoughts; Formats: CD, digital download

=== Extended plays ===
Title	Details
Reframed EP	Release date: 18 August 2020; Label: Tru Thoughts; Formats: Digital download

=== Singles ===
Title	Details
"Grits/Climb Down (POAM Remix)"	Release date: 12 August 2019; Label: Tru Thoughts; Formats: Digital download
"Listen"	Release date: 23 May 2019; Label: Tru Thoughts; Formats: Digital download
"Nothing to Lose"	Release date: 17 April 2019; Label: Tru Thoughts; Formats: Digital download
"Rising Tide" (feat. Kobi Onyame)	Release date: 2015; Label: Independent; Formats: Digital download
"Paych£ck"	Release date: 2014; Label: Independent; Formats: Digital download

=== Mixtapes ===
Title	Details
Mixtape Vol. 1	Release date: 2013; Label: Independent; Formats: CD, digital download
Mixtape Vol. 2	Release date: 2014; Label: Independent; Formats: CD, digital download

=== Music videos ===
Song	Year
"Brother"	2013
"Nothing to Lose"	2019
"Listen"	2019
"Grits"	2019
