= Allan Loeb =

American film producer

- Born: July 25, 1969 (age 57); Highland Park, Illinois, U.S.
- Education: Ithaca College
- Occupations: Screenwriter, Movie Producer, Television Creator/Producer
- Writing career
- Period: 2004–present
- Notable works: 21; Wall Street: Money Never Sleeps

Allan Loeb (born July 25, 1969) is an American screenwriter and film and television producer. He wrote the 2007 film Things We Lost in the Fire and created the 2008 television series New Amsterdam. He wrote the film drama 21, which also was released in 2008. Among his other credits, he wrote and produced The Switch (2010). He also co-wrote Wall Street: Money Never Sleeps (2010), and wrote The Dilemma (2011), and Just Go with It (2011). He performed a rewrite for the musical Rock of Ages (2012), and the mixed martial arts comedy Here Comes the Boom (2012).

== Life and career ==
Loeb was born to a Jewish family in Highland Park, Illinois, the son of Elsie and Henry Loeb. He attended Ithaca College in New York from 1988 to 1992, dropping out to work at the Chicago Board of Trade. He relocated to Los Angeles, California in 1993 to pursue a career in screenwriting. In 2004, after graduating from the University of California, Los Angeles, he moved to New York to write the script for The Only Living Boy in New York, which was eventually made into a 2017 film. Loeb returned to Los Angeles and continued writing his script with the help of Little Miss Sunshine producers Albert Berger and Ron Yerxa. He also joined Gamblers Anonymous to address his gambling addiction, which he claims changed his writing for the better. Around this time, Loeb began work on his next script, Things We Lost in the Fire.

Things We Lost in the Fire was met with mixed reviews and was a box office failure grossing only around $8 million worldwide. In 2008, Loeb shared 'screenplay' credit with Peter Steinfeld on the film 21 (2008 film), produced by and starring Kevin Spacey. In 2010, Loeb wrote The Switch, which premiered in August 2010. The film received relatively poor reviews and grossed nearly $50 million worldwide. He also co-wrote Wall Street: Money Never Sleeps directed by Oliver Stone. The film received generally favorable reviews and earned $135 million worldwide at the box office. In addition, he wrote a pair of 2011 films, The Dilemma and Just Go With It, which grossed $67 and $215 million, respectively.

Loeb rewrote the $75 million 1980s rock musical Rock of Ages, starring Tom Cruise, which Loeb received a shared 'screenplay' credit on. The film was a box office disappointment grossing only $56 million worldwide upon its release in June 2012. Additionally Loeb co-wrote, along with Kevin James, the script to the mixed martial arts comedy Here Comes the Boom.

Loeb also rewrote the 2015 earthquake disaster 3D project San Andreas at New Line Cinema, and the action comedy The Machine, with Vin Diesel attached to produce and star at MGM.

In 2015, Allan Loeb's long-developing script Out of This World, a project he had been writing since 2007, finally moved forward. Retitled The Space Between Us, the film was released in 2017. He sold his spec script, Collateral Beauty (2016), to Palm Star Media, with Will Smith cast in the lead.

=== Personal life ===
Loeb was a compulsive gambler from the age of ten until he joined Gamblers Anonymous in 2005, claiming: "Literally the minute I quit gambling my writing changed. It was magical. I had been giving so much emotional energy to gambling that only half of myself was out there writing. Gambling was a time suck, an energy suck, a creativity suck. I started going to GA meetings every Thursday night, and the writing flourished. It had so much more energy and passion." He lost up to $30,000 to his gambling addiction in a single weekend and he was eventually left with $150,000 in credit-card debt. In 2010, he relapsed and began gambling often for the next decade. In 2019, he began shorting Tesla stocks, losing what he called "the equivalent of a three-bedroom house." He was later able to escape gambling, and used his experience to advocate for legalization with guardrails. Loeb is a keen follower of rock band Grateful Dead, which he compares to the film industry in its fanbase.

== Filmography ==
| Year | Title | Writer | Producer | Notes |
|---|---|---|---|---|
| 2007 | Things We Lost in the Fire | Yes | Executive | |
| 2008 | 21 | Yes | No | Co-wrote with Peter Steinfeld |
| 2010 | The Switch | Yes | Co-producer | |
| 2010 | Wall Street: Money Never Sleeps | Yes | No | Co-wrote with Stephen Schiff |
| 2011 | The Dilemma | Yes | No | |
| 2011 | Just Go with It | Yes | No | Co-wrote with Timothy Dowling |
| 2012 | Rock of Ages | Yes | No | Co-wrote with Chris D'Arienzo and Justin Theroux |
| 2012 | Here Comes the Boom | Yes | No | Co-wrote with Kevin James |
| 2012 | So Undercover | Yes | Yes | Co-wrote with Steven Pearl |
| 2015 | The Abandoned | No | Executive | |
| 2016 | Collateral Beauty | Yes | Yes | |
| 2017 | The Space Between Us | Yes | Executive | Co-wrote with Stewart Schill and Richard Barton Lewis |
| 2017 | The Only Living Boy in New York | Yes | No | |
| 2020 | Last Moment of Clarity | No | Yes | |
