= Things We Lost in the Fire (film) =

2007 film by Susanne Bier

- Theatrical release poster
- Directed by: Susanne Bier
- Written by: Allan Loeb
- Produced by: Sam Mendes; Sam Mercer
- Starring: Halle Berry; Benicio del Toro; David Duchovny; Omar Benson Miller; Alison Lohman; John Carroll Lynch
- Cinematography: Tom Stern
- Edited by: Pernille Bech Christensen; Bruce Cannon
- Music by: Johan Söderqvist
- Production companies: DreamWorks Pictures; Neal Street Productions
- Distributed by: Paramount Pictures
- Release date: October 19, 2007
- Running time: 118 minutes
- Countries: United States; United Kingdom
- Language: English
- Budget: $16 million
- Box office: $8.5 million

Things We Lost in the Fire is a 2007 drama film directed by Susanne Bier, written by Allan Loeb, and starring Halle Berry, Benicio del Toro, and David Duchovny.

The film was released in the United States and Canada on October 19, 2007, and in the United Kingdom on February 1, 2008. While it earned slightly favorable reviews from both critics and audiences, primarily for the acting performances, Things We Lost in the Fire was financially unsuccessful, as the film only grossed $8.5 million against its production budget of $16 million.

== Plot ==
Audrey Burke and her warm, loving husband Brian have been happily married for eleven years; they have a ten-year-old daughter named Harper and a six-year-old son named Dory. Jerry Sunborne is a heroin addict who has been Brian's close childhood friend for many years.

Audrey gets tragic news delivered to her door by the local police: Brian has been killed in an attempt to defend a woman who was being beaten by her husband. On the day of the funeral Audrey realizes that she has forgotten to inform Jerry of Brian's death. Her brother Neal delivers the message to Jerry and takes him to the funeral.

Audrey invites Jerry to move into the room adjacent to their garage, which he does. During his stay at the Burke home Jerry struggles to remain drug-free and also becomes very fond of Harper and Dory. The relationship between Jerry and Audrey is fragile and complicated. Jerry helps Audrey cope in many ways, including lying with her in bed to help her sleep. But Audrey, upset and confused, takes out her grief at Brian's death on Jerry. She becomes angry when Jerry helps Dory overcome his fear of submerging his head in the pool; something Brian had tried to do for a few years.

Eventually, Audrey demands that Jerry leave the house after he questions Audrey on her reaction to Harper playing hooky from school. This causes Jerry to relapse with heroin. Audrey and Neal rescue and rehabilitate Jerry, and he agrees to admit himself to a specialized clinic. At first Harper, who has come to love Jerry as much she did her father, is angry that he is leaving. But after he leaves her a heartfelt note she accepts that he is going.

Jerry is still struggling with his addiction but seems to be well on his way to recovery. He leaves red flowers on Audrey's doorstep with a note that reads "Accept the good," a phrase which Jerry himself had told Brian, and that Brian had subsequently said to Audrey many times.

== Cast ==
- Halle Berry as Audrey Burke
- Benicio del Toro as Jerald "Jerry" Sunborne
- David Duchovny as Brian Burke
- Alexis Llewellyn as Harper Burke
- Micah Berry as Dory Burke
- John Carroll Lynch as Howard Glassman
- Alison Lohman as Kelly
- Robin Weigert as Brenda
- Omar Benson Miller as Neal
- Paula Newsome as Diane
- Liam James as David

== Music ==
The soundtrack to Things We Lost in the Fire was released on October 30, 2007.

No.	Title	Artist	Length
1.	"Opening Montage"	Gustavo Santaolalla & Johan Söderqvist	1:44
2.	"Audrey with Flowers"	Gustavo Santaolalla & Johan Söderqvist	0:28
3.	"Funeral Dinner"	Gustavo Santaolalla & Johan Söderqvist	1:03
4.	"Jerry's Apartment"	Gustavo Santaolalla & Johan Söderqvist	0:33
5.	"Audrey in Bed"	Gustavo Santaolalla & Johan Söderqvist	0:47
6.	"The Funeral"	Gustavo Santaolalla & Johan Söderqvist	1:23
7.	"Jerry by Window"	Gustavo Santaolalla & Johan Söderqvist	0:47
8.	"Brian Rubs Ear"	Gustavo Santaolalla & Johan Söderqvist	0:37
9.	"Brian Dies"	Gustavo Santaolalla & Johan Söderqvist	0:45
10.	"After the Shooting"	Gustavo Santaolalla & Johan Söderqvist	2:38
11.	"Audrey's Upset"	Gustavo Santaolalla & Johan Söderqvist	1:27
12.	"Audrey Can't Sleep"	Gustavo Santaolalla & Johan Söderqvist	0:50
13.	"Jerry Rubs Ear"	Gustavo Santaolalla & Johan Söderqvist	0:42
14.	"Audrey and Jerry in the Study"	Gustavo Santaolalla & Johan Söderqvist	1:18
15.	"Audrey Brings Clothes"	Gustavo Santaolalla & Johan Söderqvist	0:29
16.	"Almost a Kiss"	Gustavo Santaolalla & Johan Söderqvist	0:59
17.	"Jerry Takes Test"	Gustavo Santaolalla & Johan Söderqvist	0:26
18.	"Audrey Throws Out Jerry"	Gustavo Santaolalla & Johan Söderqvist	0:45
19.	"Harper on Sofa"	Gustavo Santaolalla & Johan Söderqvist	0:52
20.	"Will He Die Now?"	Gustavo Santaolalla & Johan Söderqvist	0:48
21.	"Drug Alley"	Gustavo Santaolalla & Johan Söderqvist	1:59
22.	"Jerry and Neal"	Gustavo Santaolalla & Johan Söderqvist	1:56
23.	"Cold Turkey 1"	Gustavo Santaolalla & Johan Söderqvist	0:51
24.	"Cold Turkey 2"	Gustavo Santaolalla & Johan Söderqvist	0:53
25.	"The Dinner"	Gustavo Santaolalla & Johan Söderqvist	3:38
26.	"Audrey Breaks Down"	Gustavo Santaolalla & Johan Söderqvist	2:36
27.	"Do They Glow?"	Gustavo Santaolalla & Johan Söderqvist	1:18
28.	"The Cemetery"	Gustavo Santaolalla & Johan Söderqvist	1:19
29.	"Audrey Opens the Letter"	Gustavo Santaolalla & Johan Söderqvist	0:27
30.	"End Credits"	Gustavo Santaolalla & Johan Söderqvist	2:51
Total length:			37:09

== Reception ==
=== Box office ===
Things We Lost in the Fire grossed $3.2 million, and $5.2 million in other territories, for a worldwide gross of $8.5 million.

In the United States, the film finished 11th in its opening weekend with $1.5 million opening weekend.

=== Critical reception ===
On the review aggregator Rotten Tomatoes, the film holds an approval rating of 65% based on 127 reviews, with an average rating of 6.48/10. The site's critical consensus reads, "Things We Lost in the Fire is a well-acted, beautifully filmed reflection on love, loss, addiction and recovery from life's obstacles." On Metacritic, the film had an average score of 63 out of 100, based on 30 critics, indicating "generally favorable reviews".

Josh Rosenblatt of The Austin Chronicle gave the film 4 stars and said the film is "an impeccably constructed and perfectly paced drama of domestic and internal volatility." Rosenblatt wrote "Berry is brilliant here, as good as she’s ever been" and said of Benicio del Toro's performance, "with Things We Lost in the Fire, he's managed to top even himself." Jack Mathews of the New York Daily News gave the film 3½ stars and called it "an award contender...in several positions." Mathews said it is "beautifully written" by Allan Loeb and "acted with heartbreaking efficiency by Halle Berry and Benicio del Toro." Los Angeles Daily News critic Glenn Whipp said the film "will probably be most American moviegoers' introduction to the Dogma-flavored direction of Susanne Bier" and said "Newcomers probably won't be as irritated by Bier's herky-jerky, hand-held camerawork, desaturated colors and odd obsession with random close-ups, especially of characters' eyes...For the rest of us, Bier's directorial tics are beginning to wear thin..."

Claudia Puig of USA Today gave the film 3 stars out of 4 and said "The movie makes some missteps, most of them in pacing and length, and the story veers occasionally into melodrama, but it is saved by the powerful performance of Benicio del Toro", calling him "hypnotically watchable." Joe Morgenstern of The Wall Street Journal wrote "Flawed as it is, the movie as a whole is a guilty pleasure." Morgenstern said "del Toro is a fearless actor" and said the film "would be fairly lifeless without him." Morgenstern wrote "Berry is skillful and affecting, occasionally ferocious, and subtle enough for two, in what is essentially a two-character drama." Stephen Holden of The New York Times said the film "is the kind of awards-seeking Hollywood movie that bends over backward to prove that serious American movies can hold their own with the best films from overseas. They don’t, of course, except in very rare instances."

== Home media ==
The film was released on DVD and HD DVD on March 4, 2008, and on Blu-ray on March 24, 2009.
