= The Only Living Boy in New York (film) =

- Theatrical release poster
- Directed by: Marc Webb
- Written by: Allan Loeb
- Produced by: Albert Berger; Ron Yerxa
- Starring: Callum Turner; Kate Beckinsale; Pierce Brosnan; Cynthia Nixon; Jeff Bridges; Kiersey Clemons
- Cinematography: Stuart Dryburgh
- Edited by: Tim Streeto
- Music by: Rob Simonsen
- Production companies: Amazon Studios; Big Indie Pictures; Bona Fide Productions
- Distributed by: Roadside Attractions; Amazon Studios
- Release date: August 11, 2017
- Running time: 88 minutes
- Country: United States
- Language: English
- Box office: $2.1 million

The Only Living Boy in New York is a 2017 American drama film directed by Marc Webb and written by Allan Loeb. The film stars Callum Turner, Kate Beckinsale, Pierce Brosnan, Cynthia Nixon, Kiersey Clemons, and Jeff Bridges. The film was released on August 11, 2017, by Roadside Attractions and Amazon Studios, receiving generally negative reviews.

== Plot ==
Thomas Webb is a recent college drop-out trying to figure out what he wants to do with his life. He has a one-sided crush on his friend, Mimi. Thomas meets a new neighbor, W.F. Gerald, with whom he connects. As he spends time with him, he gets advice about life.

When Thomas and Mimi socialize in a bar, he sees his publisher father, Ethan, kissing a woman, Johanna. Fearing the affair would damage his mentally unstable mother, Judith, Thomas starts to follow Johanna. He confronts her and is surprised to learn she knows who he is.

Johanna reveals that she is an editor working with his father and recognizes Thomas from pictures in Ethan's office. He pleads with her to leave his married father alone. Johanna tells Thomas that he is still a child who does not know anything and in fact he actually wants to sleep with her too. He recounts the confrontation to W.F., then reluctantly admits that he is attracted to her.

At a friend's party, Thomas bumps into Johanna with yet another man. He calls her a hooker, but she explains her date is gay. He impulsively kisses her. An affair starts and Thomas begins to fall for Johanna. He tells her that since he was a child, he has aspired to be a writer, but Ethan told him that his essays were only "serviceable".

In W.F.'s absence Thomas finds a manuscript titled The Only Living Boy in New York in his apartment. W.F. is actually a successful, though reclusive, writer; Thomas has inspired him to write again. Thomas shows him his essays, and W.F. tells him that he has talent.

Thomas invites W.F. to a party at his father's company. He takes Mimi to the party and she surprisingly shows feelings towards him. She asks him if he is having an affair with Johanna which he denies. When Thomas sees W.F. at the party he tries to introduce him to his mother, but W.F. suddenly disappears. W.F. meets with Johanna on the roof and warns her to not hurt Thomas.

Ethan proposes marriage to Johanna so she ends her relationship with Thomas. Angry, he confronts his father and discloses he has also been sleeping with Johanna. Ethan angrily leaves the room, while Johanna tearfully tells Thomas that she really is in love with Ethan. She tells Thomas he really does not know very much. She shows him a news clipping/photograph that Ethan keeps in his office, of a younger Thomas winning a tennis match, with W.F. standing in the crowd.

Thomas confronts W.F., who explains that he was a close friend to his parents. As Ethan is infertile, W.F. fathered a child with Judith, making him Thomas's biological father. W.F. realized that he was in love with Judith, but stayed away. She realized she loved him too, and his leaving led to her years of depression. W.F. has watched Thomas from afar, hoping to connect with his son, which he now has.

Returning to his parents’ home, Thomas finds that Ethan has disclosed his affair to Judith and wants a divorce. He tells his mother that he's been in contact with W.F. and that he knows she has always been in love with W.F.

One year later, Thomas is working in a bookstore, while trying to get his writing published. Ethan comes in and they catch up. He offers to help Thomas using his publishing connections, which he declines. Thomas asks if Ethan is still in contact with Johanna, and he says no, then admits he is lying. Thomas finds Judith at a reading, listening while W.F. reads from his new book The Only Living Boy in New York. Thomas watches them and smiles, as his mother has finally found happiness.

== Cast ==
- Callum Turner as Thomas Webb
- Kate Beckinsale as Johanna
- Pierce Brosnan as Ethan Webb
- Cynthia Nixon as Judith Webb
- Jeff Bridges as W.F. Gerald
- Kiersey Clemons as Mimi Pastori
- Tate Donovan as George
- Wallace Shawn as David
- Anh Duong as Barbara
- Debi Mazar as Anna
- Bill Camp as Uncle Buster
- James Saito as James
- Peter Francis James as Peter

== Production ==
On August 15, 2012, it was announced Marc Webb would direct the film. Actors joined the cast on separate dates: Miles Teller on November 4, 2014, Callum Turner on September 8, 2016, who replaced Teller in the cast, Kate Beckinsale on September 20, 2016, Pierce Brosnan on September 23, 2016, and Kiersey Clemons on September 27, 2016. Principal photography began in October 2016.

== Release ==
The film was released on August 11, 2017, by Roadside Attractions and Amazon Studios.

=== Critical response ===
On review aggregator website Rotten Tomatoes, the film has an approval rating of 33% based on 91 reviews, and an average rating of 4.70/10. The site's consensus reads: "Narratively messy and cloying, The Only Living Boy in New York is a romantic trifle that audiences won't want to give a second date". On Metacritic, the film has a weighted average score of 33 out of 100, based on 23 critics, indicating "generally unfavorable reviews".

Writing for Rolling Stone, Peter Travers unfavorably compared the film to The Graduate, giving it one and a half stars out of four and saying, "Even the best actors – and this coming-of-age movie boasts a handful of them – can't fight this much tin-eared dialogue."
