= Pushin' On =

Studio album by The Quantic Soul Orchestra
- Released: May 5, 2005
- Recorded: 2004–2005
- Genre: Funk, soul, electronica
- Length: 39:05
- Label: Tru Thoughts (UK), Ubiquity (US)
- Producer: The Quantic Soul Orchestra

Quantic chronology
Mishaps Happening (2004)	Pushin' On (2005)	An Announcement to Answer (2006)

Professional ratings
Review scores
Source	Rating
Allmusic	3.5/5 stars
Artist Direct	3.5/5 stars
Okayplayer	4.5/5 stars

Pushin' On is Quantic Soul Orchestra's second full-length release. The singer Alice Russell performs on several of the album's tracks. The title track is featured in the pilot episode of Californication and the 2008 film Strange Wilderness.

== Track listing ==
1. "Introducing...The Quantic Soul Orchestra" - 2:35
2. "West Pier Getdown" - 4:17
3. "Pushin' On" - 3:19
4. "That Goose on My Grave" - 3:48
5. "Feeling Good" - 3:52
6. "Conspirator (Main Theme)" - 3:32
7. "Hands of My Love" - 2:45
8. "Hold On Tight" - 4:21
9. "Get a Move On" - 3:35
10. "Paintings and Journeys" - 3:27
11. "End of the Road" - 3:26
