= Portakabin Fever =

Studio album by Hint
- Released: 22 April 2003
- Recorded: 2002
- Genre: Electronica/Downtempo
- Length: 54:05
- Label: Hombre; MEX036CD

Professional ratings
Review scores
Source	Rating
Allmusic	4/5 stars

Hint's debut album, Portakabin Fever, was released on the Hombre independent record label in association with Ninja Tune on 22 April 2003.

The album reportedly got its name as it was recorded in a Portakabin. The album's inlay features a cartoon drawn by graphic artist Will Barras, in which Hint is depicted fishing in the (imagined) swamp outside his home. The cartoon prompted a comic strip loosely based on James' lifestyle, which was serialised in Japanese magazine, Plus 81.

The album was mixed at State of Art, the Bristol-based studio owned by Geoff Barrow of Portishead.

== Track listing ==
1. "Actory"
2. "The Look Up"
3. "Words to that Effect"
4. "Why the Top 10 Sucks in 2002"
5. "You Little Trooper"
6. "Re:Percussions"
7. "Quite Spectacular"
8. "Plucker"
9. "Shout of Blue"
10. "Count Your Blessings"
11. "Air to Sky"
