= Deep funk =

Subgenre of funk music

- Stylistic origins: Funk
- Cultural origins: Late 1960s, United States
- Derivative forms: Hip hop, rare groove, Northern soul

Other topics
- List of funk musicians

Deep funk is a subgenre of funk music which features a "hard, lean" sound and emphasis on groove, improvisation, and musicianship over traditional songwriting. The term is also used to describe rare funk recordings sought out by collectors and DJs. Artists such as James Brown and the Meters were basic reference points for the style.

Deep funk later saw increased popularity due to hip hop producers seeking out new material to sample, as well as in the British rare groove and Northern soul scenes. Though most deep funk was originally released on 45s, modern releases by labels such as Goldmine, BBE, and Stones Throw, as well as DJ Keb Darge's compilations of deep funk, have helped usher the style into the CD age.

== History ==
It got its name after DJ Keb Darge's "Legendary Deep Funk" DJ night, held at Madame Jojo's nightclub in London's Soho district. The night started originally with Snowboy, Keb Darge and Greg Belson as the DJs for the club session.

The focus of the scene is collecting and DJing rare funk 45s of the deep funk genre, most usually released originally by local funk groups and artists in the USA throughout the 1960s and 1970s that usually stayed in their local home bases, only playing nearby clubs and other venues, and releasing their music on small local and regional record labels at the time in the form of 7" 45 rpm singles in quite small quantities (usually about 1,000–5,000 copies or fewer), hence their extreme rarity and high collectible value. Most of these records have quite high re-sale values due to their scarcity, with some selling for upwards of four to five figures.

== See also ==
- Northern soul
- Rare groove
