= Quantic (musician) =

English musician, DJ and record producer (born 1980)

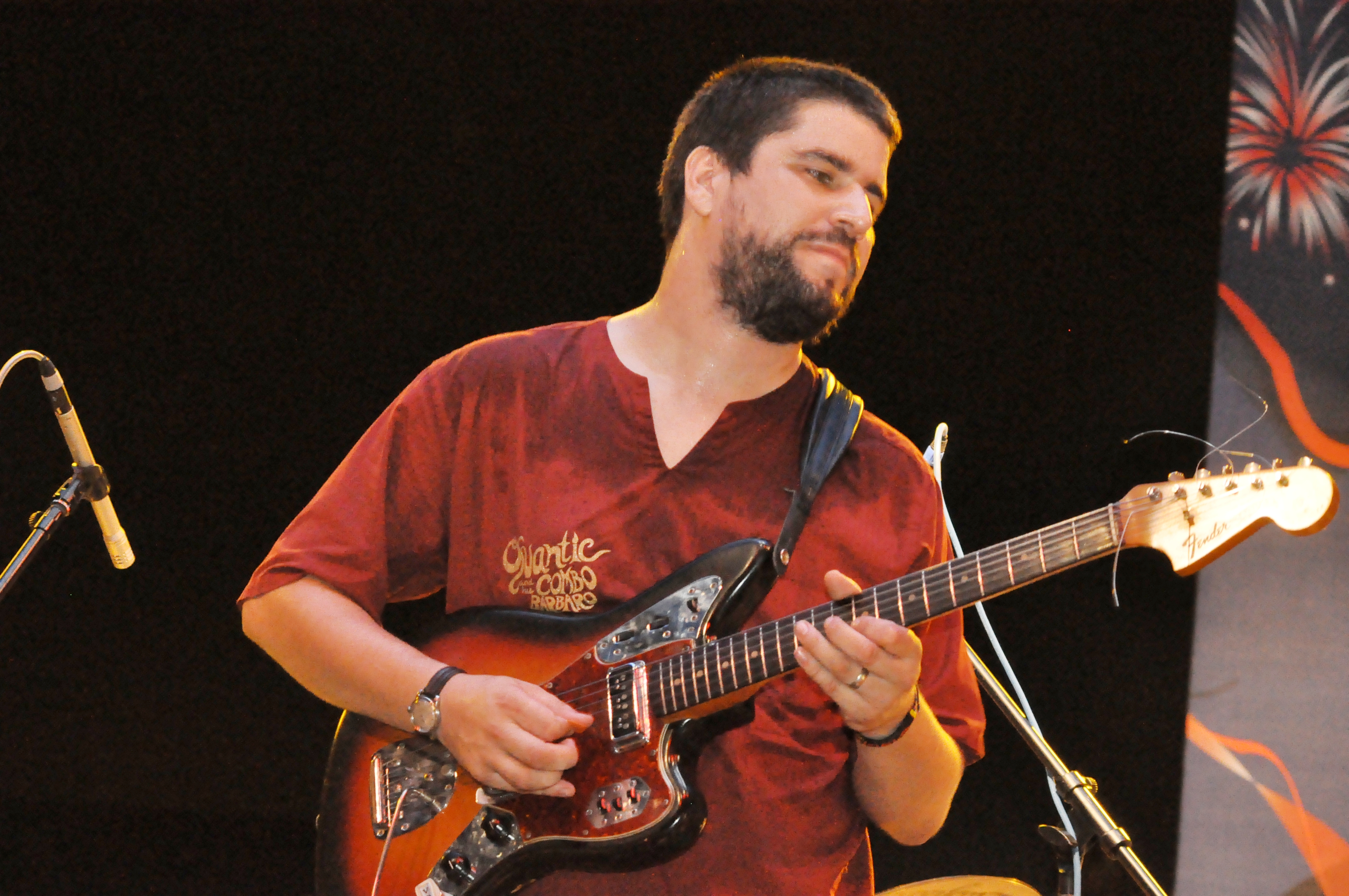
- Quantic performing with his Combo Bárbaro in 2009

Background information
- Born: William George Holland; 18 April 1980 (age 46); Bewdley, Worcestershire, England
- Genres: Cumbia; trip hop; funk; bossa nova; soul; jazz; downtempo; nu jazz
- Years active: 2000–present
- Labels: Tru Thoughts; Selva

Quantic (William Holland, born 18 April 1980) is an English musician, DJ, and record producer. His music features elements of tropical, cumbia, salsa, bossa nova, soul, funk and jazz. Holland plays guitars, bass, double bass, piano, organ, saxophone, accordion and percussion. Much of his sound is original composition, rather than sampling of other artists' material. In addition to his original compositions, he has also produced remixes of over 30 songs.

Quantic's first label was called Magnetic Fields, on which he released heavy soul and funk. He retired Magnetic Fields in 2003. In 2018, he founded the record label Selva, based in Brooklyn, New York, and he has been releasing music on Selva since the start of 2020.

== History ==
Quantic was born William Holland in Bewdley, Worcestershire, England. His albums The 5th Exotic (2001) and Apricot Morning (2002) featured vocals from British artists including soul singer Alice Russell. In 2003, he assembled The Quantic Soul Orchestra, a project aimed at producing 1960s/1970s style raw funk, playing guitar himself, and featuring musicians including his sister Lucy on saxophone.

In 2007, Holland moved to Cali, Colombia. He set up an analogue studio called Sonido del Valle and recorded and released the Quantic Soul Orchestra album Tropidélico (2007) and the self-titled debut from his tropical-dub side project, Quantic presenta Flowering Inferno (2008), which featured a variety of musicians from the area. He subsequently assembled the Combo Bárbaro ('Bárbaro' is a colloquial term in Colombia meaning 'very talented').

Holland's collaboration with Nickodemus, "Mi swing es tropical", was featured on an Apple iPod television commercial in 2007.

== The Quantic Soul Orchestra ==
The Quantic Soul Orchestra
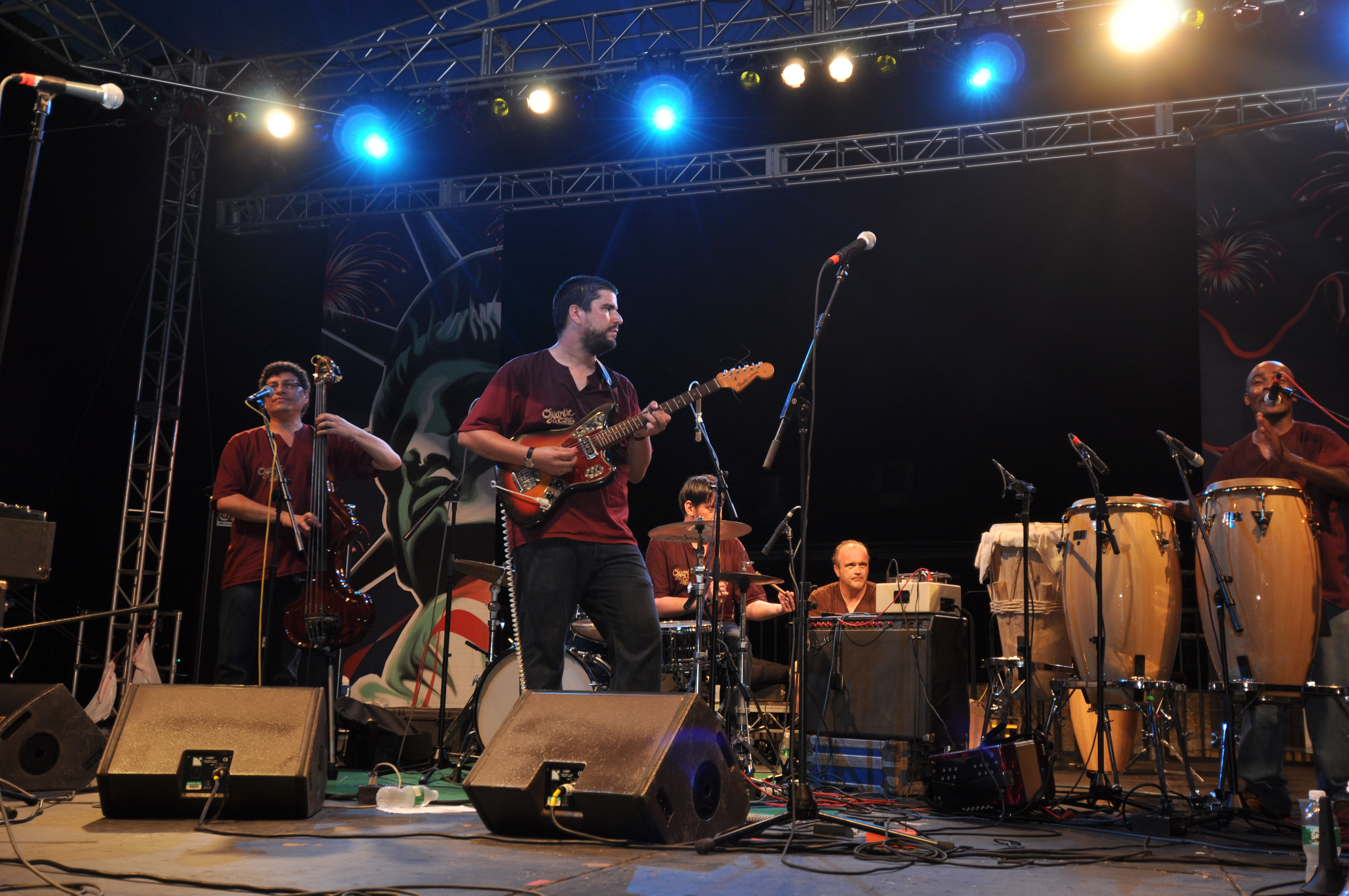

Background information
- Origin: England
- Genres: Funk, salsa, bossa nova, soul
- Years active: 2001–present
- Label: Tru Thoughts
- Members: Will Holland; German 'Chispa' Lawson; Javier Rivera; Popo Buckley
- Past members: Alice Russell; Damian Bell; Rich Gibbs; Lucy Holland; Russell Knight; Jamie Lawrence; Simon Little; Oliver Minkley; Antonia Pheulatos; Russell Porter; John Styles; Dave Woodhouse

The Quantic Soul Orchestra is a live band project of various musicians and Holland. Holland has recorded under several names, most notably Quantic. The band's line-up changes from album to album, with sometime members including Holland's sister, saxophonist Lucy Holland, his Limp Twins collaborator Russ Porter and former Hardkandy member Simon Little. Will Holland plays guitar and bass, and performs some of the percussion.

Their music focuses on reviving a dusty funk and jazz sound. They are signed to the Tru Thoughts label and have released four albums to date as well as a collaborative album with funk and soul artist Spanky Wilson.

Their album Tropidélico was recorded in Colombia, where Holland was based at the time.

== Discography ==
=== Albums ===
Holland has self-produced 18 studio albums under various pseudonyms. Until 2020, all his albums were released on the label Tru Thoughts from Brighton:

Sortable table
| Date | Main recording artist | Album |
|---|---|---|
| 2001 | Quantic | The 5th Exotic |
| 2002 | Quantic | Apricot Morning |
| 2003 | The Limp Twins | Tales from Beyond the Groove |
| 2003 | The Quantic Soul Orchestra | Stampede |
| 2004 | Quantic | Mishaps Happening |
| 2005 | The Quantic Soul Orchestra | Pushin' On |
| 2006 | Quantic | One Off's Remixes and B Sides |
| 2006 | Quantic | An Announcement to Answer |
| 2006 | Spanky Wilson & The Quantic Soul Orchestra | I'm Thankful |
| 2007 | The Quantic Soul Orchestra | Tropidélico |
| 2008 | Quantic presents Flowering Inferno | Death of the Revolution |
| 2009 | Quantic presents Flowering Inferno | Dog with a Rope |
| 2009 | Quantic & His Combo Bárbaro | Tradition in Transition |
| 2012 | Quantic & Alice Russell & The Combo Bárbaro | Look Around the Corner |
| 2011 | Quantic | The Best of Quantic |
| 2012 | Los Miticos del Ritmo | Los Miticos del Ritmo |
| 2012 | Ondatrópica | Ondatrópica |
| 2014 | Quantic | Magnetica |
| 2015 | Quantic Presents The Western Transient | A New Constellation |
| 2016 | Flowering Inferno | 1000 Watts |
| 2017 | Ondatrópica | Baile Bucanero |
| 2017 | Quantic & Nidia Góngora | Curao |
| 2019 | Quantic | Atlantic Oscillations |
| 2019 | Quantic | Atlantic Modulations |
| 2020 | Quantic & Denitia | Nowhere |
| 2023 | Quantic | Dancing While Falling |

=== Singles ===
- 2001: Quantic – "We Got Soul"
- 2001: The Quantic Soul Orchestra – "Super 8"
- 2001: The Limp Twins – "Living Well"
- 2001: Quantic – "Life in the Rain"
- 2002: Quantic feat. Aspects – "Primate Boogaloo"
- 2002: Quantic feat. Alice Russell – "Sweet Calling"
- 2002: Quantic – "Apricot Morning"
- 2002: Quantic – "Through These Eyes"
- 2003: Quantic – "Search the Heavens"
- 2004: Quantic – "Mishaps Happening"
- 2005: Quantic feat. Spanky Wilson – "Don't Joke with a Hungry Man"
- 2005: Quantic – "Perception"
- 2005: Quantic – "One Off's Remixes and B Sides"
- 2006: Quantic – "The Sound of Everything"
- 2006: Quantic feat. Alice Russell – "Somebody's Gonna Love You"
- 2006: Quantic – "Tell It Like You Mean It"
- 2007: Quantic – "Sabor"
- 2008: Quantic & Nickodemus – "Mi swing es tropical"
- 2008: Quantic presenta Flowering Inferno – "Juanita Bonita"
- 2008: Quantic presenta Flowering Inferno – "Death of the Revolution"
- 2008: Quantic presenta Flowering Inferno – "Ciudad del Swing"
- 2008: Quantic – "When You're Through"
- 2009: Quantic & Nickodemus – "Sun People"
- 2011: Quantic – "Sol Clap"
- 2011: Quantic & Los Miticos del Ritmo – "Hiphop en Cumbia"
- 2012: Quantic & Alice Russell with the Combo Bárbaro – "Look Around the Corner"
- 2012: Quantic & Alice Russell with the Combo Bárbaro – "Magdalena"
- 2013: Quantic & Alice Russell with the Combo Bárbaro – "I'd Cry"
- 2013: Quantic & Ana Tijoux – "Doo Wop (That Thing)"
- 2013: Quantic & Nidia Góngora – "Muévelo negro"
- 2014: Quantic – "Duvidó"
- 2014: Quantic & Alice Russell – "You Will Return"
- 2014: Quantic – "Spark It"
- 2014: Quantic – "El Yagé" (self-released)
- 2023: Quantic feat. Andreya Triana - "Run"

=== Collaborations on individual songs by other artists ===
Holland has collaborated and was featured on many recordings by other musicians, including (listed alphabetically):

- DJ Greyboy, on the track "Got to Be a Love" from the album Soul Mosaic (2004).
- Kinny, on the track "Enough Said" (2008).
- Lanu, on the track "Mother Earth" from the album This Is My Home (2007).
- Mr. Scruff, on the tracks "It's Dancing Time" (2002), "Giraffe Walk" (2006) and "Donkey Ride" (2008).
- Nickodemus, as co-producer for "La lluvia", "Didibina" on the album Sun People (2009), and on "Conmigo" (2012) as guitarist.
- Nostalgia 77, on the track "Thing" (2004); as saxophonist.
- Alice Russell, on the track "Somebody's Gonna Love You" from the album Under the Munka Moon (2004).
- Transgressors, on the tracks "Will Power" and "Money for Born, Money for Die" from the single Will Power (2012); as guitarist.
- The Whitefield Brothers on the track "Lullaby for Lagos" from the album Earthology (2009); as guitarist.
- Wilbur Soot on the album “Mammalian Sighing Reflex” (2023);
