= Keb Darge =

Scottish DJ and music producer (b. 1957)

- Born: 1957 (age 68–69)
- Origin: Scotland
- Genres: Northern soul; deep funk; garage punk; rockabilly
- Occupations: DJ; record producer
- Years active: 1970s–present
- Label: Barely Breaking Even

Keb Darge (born 1957) is a Scottish DJ and music producer, in the genres of Northern soul, deep funk, garage punk, and rockabilly music. He is credited with inventing the term "deep funk".

== Early life ==
Darge has described himself as "a bit of a thug" in his youth. In his late teens, he "picked a fight with the only English boy in the town", and the other teenager gave him a drubbing, using taekwondo moves. Surprised, Darge asked him how he had done it, then began taking taekwondo classes. He eventually became Scottish taekwondo champion.

Darge began Northern soul dancing in his late teens and entered local disco dance competitions (dancing in the "northern soul style") in the North of Scotland. He made an appearance in the nationally televised 1979 UK disco dance finals. Along with his Scottish dancing, he also danced at the Wigan Casino. Darge began buying records for what would eventually become his ultimate passion and career for the rest of his life.

== Career ==
Soon after he began dancing, he was DJing in Wigan at a club next to the casino, and around Scotland as well with his record collection throughout the 1970s. At the age of 22, Darge moved to London, ceasing to be a DJ. Music promoters from then approached him, asking him to come back to DJing. He obliged, and gave the Northern soul phenomenon exposure in London through his performances, bringing in people from northern England to London who were previously associated with Wigan's Northern soul scene before it dissolved. Meanwhile, he worked in various jobs, including butcher's boy, window cleaner and delivering leaflets.

During the 1970s, his work in tracking down vintage funk and soul music led to friendships with American musicians including Isaac Hayes, Curtis Mayfield, Harold Melvin, and George Clinton. In 1987, he sold many of his Northern soul records to pay for his divorce but he had left over in his loft many other records of what he then referred to as "junk music" that he had picked up in the United States on his many jaunts to find Northern soul records there and in the UK. This "junk music" would be the beginning of what Keb would later call "Deep Funk", having underestimated the potential of these leftover records.

In 1989, during the heyday of acid house in the UK, Keb decided to play these funk records, and managed for a short while to get a night to perform regularly at "The Wagclub", a club specializing in acid jazz. After his night there ended around 1992–93, he met fellow funk record collector Mark Cotgrove, aka Snowboy, at Club Ormonds in London where the first funk-only night in the city was held, called 'Deep Funk'. The night was named by Keb (he would later go on to use the name to describe the sound of the funk records he would play), but arranged by the club owners.

After this, Keb and Snowboy wanted to further expand on the "deep funk" sound, and decided to start their own all-funk night in on old restaurant, but this failed to catch on after a few months due to the burgeoning popularity of house music in the UK at the time, forcing Keb and Snowboy to close up shop there. After this Snowboy left to focus on his jazz dance events. Shortly afterwards, Keb heard about Madame Jojo's, a strip club located in the Soho district of London. He managed to arrange with the club a night for himself and various guests to perform weekly. The club accommodated him and Keb's funk nights there became an instant success (and still are the leading club nights for funk in London today). Madame Jojo's closed down their strip nights, becoming a full-time music club, partly due to Keb's success there.

Until early 2010, Keb held a funk night at the club every Friday, called "Legendary Deep Funk". He also tours around the world DJing and runs a record label, Kay-Dee, with Kenny Dope. He has released several albums of compiled classic deep funk tracks, most notably the Funk Spectrum: Real Funk For Real People and Keb Darge's Deep Funk compilations released on BBE Records. Keb Darge is a leading authority on deep funk and soul music of the 1960s and 1970s. He has also helped to produce the modern-day funk group The New Mastersounds. In 1995, Keb had a cameo part in the surf film, Blue Juice, starring Sean Pertwee and Catherine Zeta-Jones, where he can be seen dancing in the village hall.

== Personal life ==
Darge has been married four times. His middle two marriages ended in divorce with hefty settlements and caused him to sell off much of his prized record collection. He is currently married to a woman from the Philippines and decided to move to the Philippines in the early months of 2012. After Typhoon Haiyan struck the Philippines in 2013, Keb provided food and shelter to victims of the storm. He also criticized the stockpiling of food aid by corrupt local politicians on his Facebook page. He has a passion for militaria and is an avid collector of military miniatures.

== Discography ==
=== Compilation albums ===
- Keb Darge's Legendary's Deep Funk vol. 1 – BBE (1997) CD/LP
- Keb Darge's Legendary's Deep Funk vol. 2 – BBE (1998) CD/LP
- Keb Darge's Legendary's Deep Funk vol. 3 – BBE (1999) CD/LP
- Soul Spectrum – with Bob Jones, BBE (1998) CD/LP
- Soul Spectrum II – BBE (1999) CD/LP
- Jazz Spectrum: Real Jazz For Real People – with Bob Jones, BBE (1999) CD/LP
- Funk Spectrum: Real Funk For Real People – with Josh Davis, BBE (1999) CD/LP
- Funk Spectrum II: Real Funk For Real People – with Kenny Dope, BBE (2000) CD/LP
- Funk Spectrum III: Real Funk For Real People – with Pete Rock, BBE (2001) CD/LP
- Keb Darge Presents Funk For The 21st Century – Do Right! Music (2002) CD
- Beams Presents The Keb Darge Experience – Beams (1999) CD/LP
- Beams Presents Keb Darge Deep Funk – Beams (2002) CD
- Keb Darge Digs For... P&P Records – P&P Records (2007) CD
- The Kings Of Funk – with RZA, BBE (2007) CD/LP
- Keb Darge and Cut Chemist present Lost And Found – BBE (2007) CD/LP (LP released in 2013)
- Keb Darge and Cut Chemist present The Darkside – BBE (2017) CD/LP
- Kenny Dope & Keb Darge present Kay-Dee Records – Kay-Dee (2006) CD
- Kenny Dope & Keb Darge present Kay-Dee Volume 2 – Kay-Dee (2008) CD
- This Is Dj's Choice Vol. 2 – with Lucinda Slim, Unique (2009) CD/LP
- Keb Darge & Paul Weller – Lost & Found (Real R'N'B & Soul) – BBE (2009) CD/LP
- Keb Darge And Little Edith's Legendary Rockin' R&B – BBE (2010) CD/LP
- Keb Darge & Little Edith's Legendary Wild Rockers – BBE (2011) CD/LP
- Keb Darge & Little Edith's Legendary Wild Rockers 2 – BBE (2012) CD/LP
- Keb Darge & Little Edith's Legendary Wild Rockers 3 – BBE (2013) CD/LP

=== Production ===
- Imaginary Visions: Texas Rumble / The Houston Hook – Deep Funk (2000) 7"
- Imaginary Visions: Drop Your Load / Imaginary Visions Deep Funk (2001) 7"
- The New Mastersounds: Hot Dog / Drop It Down – Deep Funk (2001) 7"
- The New Mastersounds: It's Alright Now – Deep Funk (2001) 7"
- The New Mastersounds: Nervous – Deep Funk (2001) 12"
- The New Mastersounds: Keb Darge presents The New Mastersounds – Deep Funk/BBE (2001) LP/CD
- The New Mastersounds: Nervous – Kay-Dee (2003)
- The Inmates: Bread And Water – Our Label Records (2006) 7"
- The Magnificent Freedom: F*ck Off And Leave Me Alone – Our Label Records (2006) 7"
