= Tropical music =

Music from the Spanish-speaking Caribbean

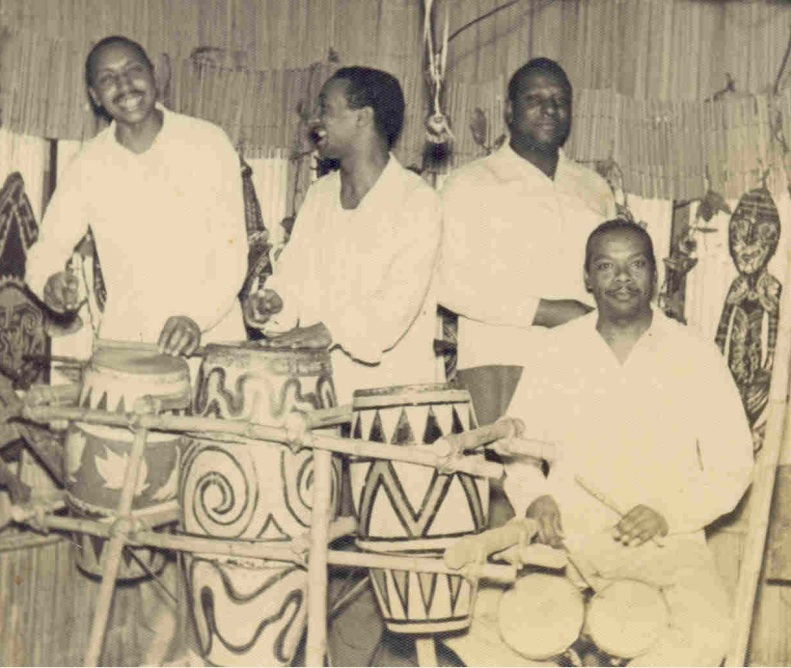
Los Guayacanes, an afroargentine band of tropical music.

Tropical music (Spanish: música tropical) is a broad category within Latin music that refers to rhythmic, dance-oriented music genres originating from the Spanish-speaking Caribbean and surrounding regions. This includes the islands of Cuba, Puerto Rico, the Dominican Republic, and the Caribbean coastal regions of Colombia, Mexico, Central America and Venezuela.

In the 1940s and 1950s, the term tropical music was created to cover all music from the hispanophone Caribbean excluding Cuban music, which had its own category and niche within the American (and to a lesser extent European) music market. However, later in the 20th century after the Cuban Revolution, tropical music gained a broader meaning and began to be used in order to distinguish Caribbean genres such as cumbia and son cubano from inland genres such as tejano and norteño.

== Characteristics ==
Due to its geographical roots, tropical music generally combines elements from European and African traditions. An example of this is the process of binarization of ternary rhythms brought from Africa, which took place originally in Cuba, later spreading throughout the rest of the Caribbean and Latin America. The presence of syncopated polyrhythms of African origin makes most tropical music naturally dance-oriented. Tropical music instrumentation also includes both European (tres, piano, trumpet, timbales) and African-descended (congas, bongos, marimba) instruments. During the late 20th century, contemporary instruments such as synthesizers and drum machines were incorporated.

== History ==
Despite being a concept created in the 20th century within the music industry, tropical music encompasses genres and styles that can be traced back to the 16th century, when the Caribbean (and thus America) was discovered and colonized by Europeans. It was not until the 19th century that tropical music became a global phenomenon with the popularization of Cuban contradanza (also known as habanera). Cuba would continue to spearhead the development of tropical music with other ballroom music styles, as well as the bolero and son cubano. The Dominican Republic contributed with merengue and bachata, two very successful genres, while Puerto Rican music is exemplified by relatively minor genres such as bomba and plena. The very popular cumbia and vallenato originated on the coasts of Colombia.

Tropical music would have a long-lasting impact in the music of other regions beyond the Caribbean such as the United States (where rhumba and salsa were primarily developed), Africa (where soukous was developed), and South America. For example, in Chile, tropical music genres were progressively introduced depending on their popularity in the Caribbean and North America. Thus, genres such as guaracha, mambo, cha cha cha and later cumbia made their way into the radios and concert halls of Chile between the 1930s and 1960s.

Tropical music enjoys a dedicated global following among music fans and record collectors. In some cities, DJs will hold music nights and play a variety of tropical music, featuring vintage (1970s and earlier) cumbia, salsa, mambo, Caribbean and African music, often on vinyl records. Modern artists such as British musician Quantic derive significant influence from music styles within the tropical genre.

== Radio format ==
Tropical music also refers to a music format common in Latin music radio stations. Among the most popular tropical styles are salsa, merengue, bachata, and cumbia.

== See also ==
- Caribbean music
- Grammy Award for Best Tropical Latin Album
- Latin Grammy Award for Best Tropical Song
- Latin pop
- List of radio formats
- Regional Mexican
- Billboard tropical charts
- Urbano music
