= Flevans =

British musician

- Birth name: Nigel Evans
- Born: 28 January 1978 (age 47)
- Origin: Brighton, UK
- Genres: Electronic breakbeat abstract downtempo broken beat funk / soul
- Occupation(s): Musician, Producer, DJ
- Instrument(s): Sampler/Sequencer; Turntables; Mixer; Bass; Guitar; Keys; Vocals; Drums
- Labels: Tru Thoughts; Jack To Phono Records; LOA Records
- Members: Nigel Evans, Greg Houghton, George Cooper
- Website: flevans.co.uk

Flevans is a British electronic musician. His first studio album, Make New Friends, was released in 2004. Evans began his career with sampling and plays several musical instruments.
