= The 5th Exotic =

Studio album by Quantic
- Released: May 31, 2001
- Recorded: 2000–2001
- Genres: Trip hop, funk, nu jazz, soul, electronica
- Label: Tru Thoughts

Quantic chronology
The 5th Exotic (2001)	Apricot Morning (2002)

The 5th Exotic is the first album by Quantic, released on May 31, 2001.

== Track listing ==
1. "Introduction"
2. "The 5th Exotic"
3. "Snakes in the Grass"
4. "Infinite Regression"
5. "Life in the Rain"
6. "Long Road Ahead"
7. "Common Knowledge"
8. "The Picture Inside"
9. "Through These Eyes"
10. "Time is the Enemy"
11. "In the Key of Blue"
12. "Meaning"
