= Spanky Wilson =

American soul, funk and jazz vocalist (born c. 1947)

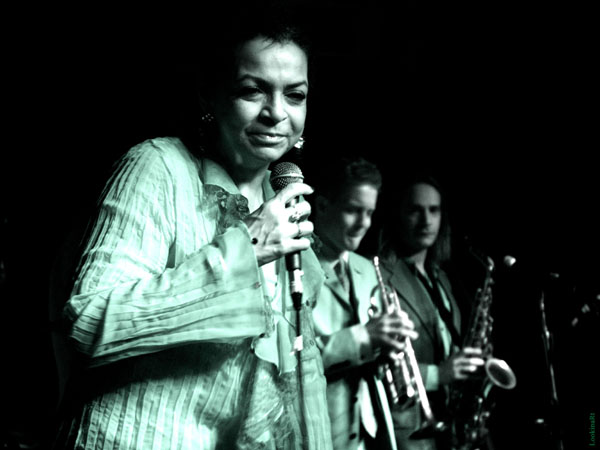
- Spanky Wilson with the Quantic Soul Orchestra, 2006

Background information
- Born: Louella Wilson c.1947 (age 74–75); Philadelphia, United States
- Genres: Jazz, funk
- Occupation: Singer
- Years active: 1969–present

Louella "Spanky" Wilson (born c. 1947) is an American soul, funk and jazz vocalist, who has performed internationally and recorded several albums since the late 1960s.

== Biography ==
Wilson was born in Philadelphia as Louella Wilson, and was raised in Pittsburgh, Pennsylvania, reputedly gaining the nickname "Spanky" as a result of the spankings she received from her father. Wilson started singing as a child and after an early marriage, began performing in clubs aged 17 with Stanley Turrentine. She was soon recruited by Jimmy McGriff for a national tour, which ended in 1967 in Los Angeles, California. There, she sang in clubs and was introduced to H. B. Barnum, who invited her to record. Wilson sang as a backing vocalist on records by Letta Mbulu, O. C. Smith, Lou Rawls and others, before releasing her first single, "The Last Day of Summer", produced by Barnum and released in early 1969. This was followed by the album Spankin' Brand New (1969), on which all the songs were written by Howlett Smith. Wilson released several further singles on Mothers Records, a label set up in Hollywood by Jay Ward, and two more albums, Doin' It (1969) and Let It Be (1970). She also appeared on nationally networked TV shows, and made her international debut in 1970 at the Rio de Janeiro Song Festival in Brazil.

Wilson has shared the stage with soul and jazz musicians such as Marvin Gaye, Sammy Davis Jr., organists Jimmy McGriff and Brother Jack McDuff, cornetist Nat Adderley, percussionist Willie Bobo, Lalo Schifrin and Jimmy Smith. In 1971 she moved to Detroit and sang in clubs before recording for Eastbound, a subsidiary of Westbound Records. The 1974 single "Home" was again co-written by Howlett Smith, and Westbound released the album Specialty of the House the following year. She returned to live in Los Angeles, and performed in clubs there for several years, before moving to France in 1985 and re-marrying. During the late 1980s and 1990s, Wilson performed mainly in France, Germany and other parts of Europe. In 2000, she released the album Things Are Getting Better with the Philippe Milanta Trio. About the same time, several compilations of her earlier recordings were released in Britain.

In 2000, after she had returned to live in California, Wilson was contacted by British DJ and record producer Quantic of The Quantic Soul Orchestra, and they began working together. They recorded several singles, and released the album I'm Thankful in 2006.

== Discography (partial) ==
=== Studio albums ===
- Spankin' Brand New, Mothers Records & The Snarf Company (1969)
- Doin it, Mothers Records & The Snarf Company (1969)
- Let It Be, Mothers Records & The Snarf Company (1970)
- Specialty of the House, 20th Century / Westbound Records (1975)
- Singin and Swingin, Big Blue Records (1991)
- Things are Getting Better, Jazz Aux Remparts (1999)
- I'm Thankful with the Quantic Soul Orchestra, Tru Thoughts (2006)
- T.G.I.F "Thank God it's Funky" with Ruckus Roboticus, Dance or Die Records (2012)

=== Compilations ===
- The Westbound Years, Westbound Records (2007)

With Teddy Edwards

- La Villa: Live in Paris (Verve/Gitanes, 1993)

== Gallery ==
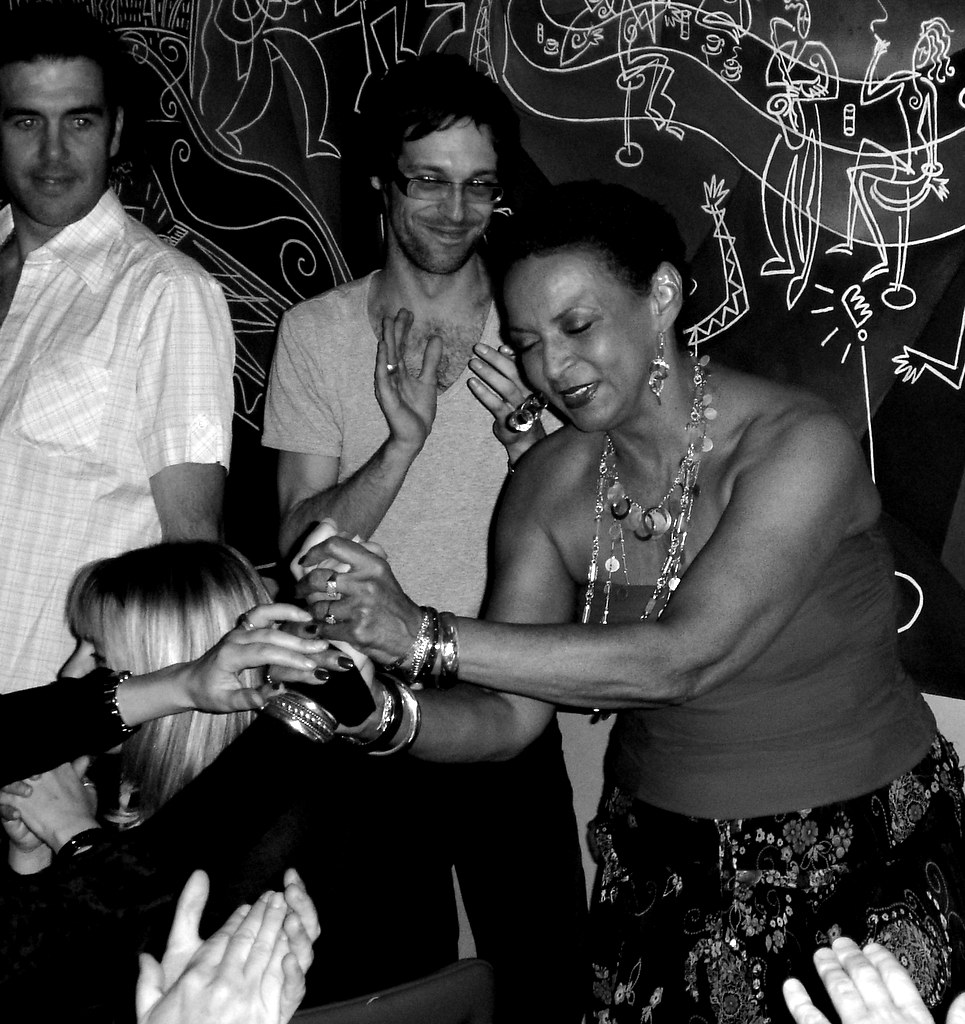

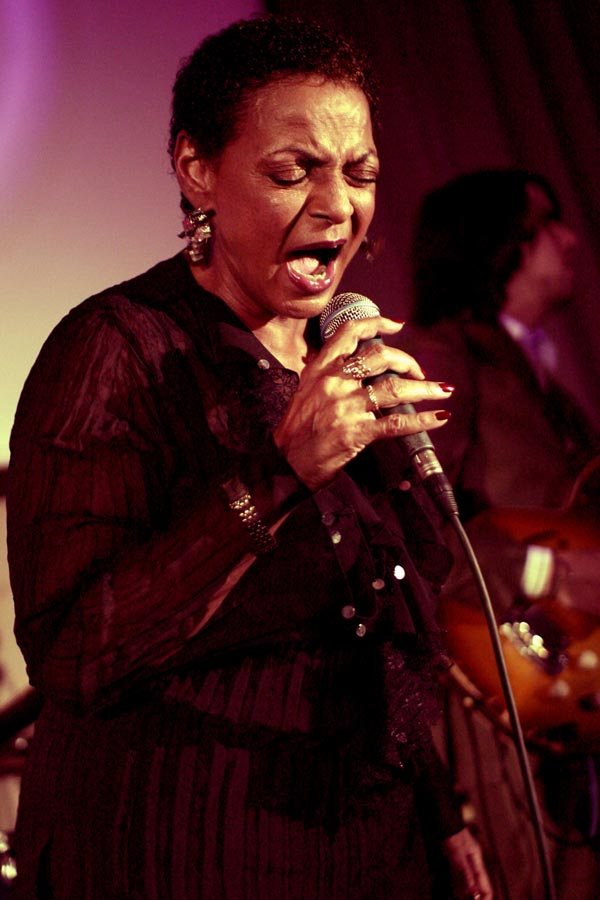

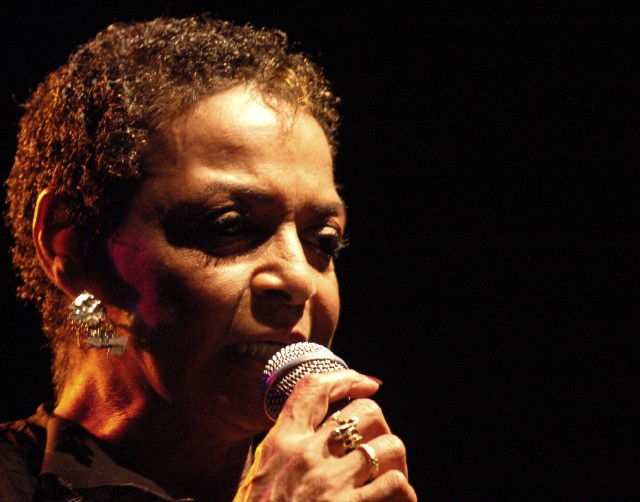
