= Nostalgia 77 =

British musician

Benedic Lamdin is a British music producer, composer, songwriter and guitarist who releases music as Nostalgia 77. He has produced Nostalgia 77 albums since 2004, with a variety of other musicians, some of which are instrumental and some have guest vocalists. "His music encompasses everything from sample-based compositions to collaborations with real, live musicians". Lamdin has also written and produced for assorted singers, including Jamie Cullum, Alice Russell, and Jeb Loy Nichols. He also runs his own jazz record label, Impossible Ark.

In 2007, Lamdin won Jazz Album Of The Year at the BBC Radio One / Gilles Peterson Worldwide Winners.

== Discography ==
=== Nostalgia 77 albums ===
- Songs for My Funeral (2004, Tru Thoughts)
- The Garden (2005)
- Everything Under The Sun (2007) – includes Beth Rowley
- Nostalgia 77 Sessions feat. Keith & Julie Tippett – with Keith Tippett and Julie Tippetts
- The Sleepwalking Society (2011) – vocals throughout by Josa Peit
- A Journey Too Far (2014) – includes Jeb Loy Nichols
- The Loneliest Flower in the Village (2023, Jazzman)

=== The Nostalgia 77 Octet albums ===
- Seven's & Eight's: Recorded Live at the Jazz Café (2006, Tru Thoughts)
- Borderlands (2006)
- Weapons of Jazz Destruction (2007)

=== Nostalgia 77 and the Monster albums ===
- The Taxidermist (2012, Tru Thoughts) – includes Matthew Bourne
- Measures (2014)

=== Nostalgia 77 compilation albums ===
- One Offs, Remixes & B-Sides (2008, Tru Thoughts)

=== Albums with others ===
- In The Kingdom Of Dub: Prince Fatty Meets Nostalgia 77 (2014) – with Prince Fatty
- Love & Poverty (2015) by Strange Faith (Lamdin, Jeb Loy Nichols and others)

=== Singles ===
- Prince Fatty Meets Nostalgia 77: Medicine Chest Dub / Seven Nation Army Dub feat. Dennis Alcapone
- Measures / Island In The Sun
- Walking Over / Hard Work In (Good Lovin Out)

== Awards ==
- 2007: Jazz Album Of The Year, Worldwide Winners, BBC Radio One / Gilles Peterson
