= Tru Thoughts =

British independent record label

- Founded: 1999
- Founder: Robert Luis; Paul Jonas
- Genre: Electronic; dance; funk; soul; hip hop; jazz; tropical; grime
- Country of origin: United Kingdom
- Location: Brighton
- Official website: tru-thoughts.co.uk

Tru Thoughts is a British independent record label founded in Brighton in 1999 by Robert Luis and Paul Jonas. The label has put out over 200 LPs of electronic, funk, soul, hip hop, jazz, tropical, grime and other music.

== History ==
In September 1999, after running club nights "Phonic: hoop" and "Shake Yer Wig", Paul Jonas and Robert Luis, two music-obsessed friends, launched their own label. From Luis' home, Tru Thoughts began with its first 12" EP, Steady's Alarming Frequency. Bonobo's debut album Animal Magic followed in 2000 and Quantic's debut The 5th Exotic in 2001.

In 2009, Tru Thoughts marked its 10th anniversary with a 3-disc compilation. In 2017, Tru Thoughts celebrated its 18th birthday with an all-day event at London's Roundhouse, with appearances from Quantic, Alice Russell, the Hot 8 Brass Band, Anchorsong and Rodney P.

== Other operations ==
Tru Thoughts has a publishing company called Full Thought Publishing. The music from the label has been used in adverts and appeared in films and TV programs.

Tru Thoughts organizes club nights in Brighton and London, and broadcasts on several radio stations.

It has subsidiary labels Unfold Records, for compilation releases, and Zebra Traffic, for UK hip hop.

== Recognition ==
In 2005, the label was awarded Label Of The Year at the annual Gilles Peterson Worldwide Awards.

In 2009, it was described by Martin Longley, writing for the BBC, as "easily one of the UK's best independent labels, regardless of whether its audience is energetically twitching on the dancefloor or bobbing about in a chilled boudoir."

== Artists ==
- Alice Russell
- The Bamboos
- Barakas
- Belleruche
- benji Boko
- Bonobo
- Domu
- Drumagick
- Flevans
- Flowdan
- Galaxian
- Hidden Orchestra
- Hint
- Hot 8 Brass Band
- Jon Kennedy
- Kylie Auldist
- Lightning Head
- London Posse
- Maddslinky
- Maga Bo
- Manu Delago
- Mark de Clive-Lowe
- Moonchild
- Nostalgia 77
- Omar
- Quantic with his Combo Bárbaro and his collaborations with Alice Russell and Nidia Góngora
- Peshay
- Pieces of a Man
- Riz MC
- Rodney P
- Spanky Wilson
- Sosyete '25
- Stonephace
- Ty
- Youngblood Brass Band
- Zed Bias
- Zero dB

== Discography ==
=== Compilation albums ===
- When Shapes Join Together (1999)
- When Shapes Join Together 2 (2002)
- Heavyweight Rib Ticklers – compiled by Mr. Scruff
- Phonic Hoop (2002) – compiled by Robert Luis
- When Shapes Join Together 3 (2002)
- Vocalise (compiled by Robert Luis, 2002)
- Mono – When Shapes Join Together Mix (2003) – compiled by Quantic
- Shapes One Horizontal & Vertical (2003)
- Shapes Yellow (2004)
- Shapes Red (2005)
- Shapes Compilation (2006)
- Shapes Compilation (2006)
- Shapes 07:01 All New Amazing Sounds (2007)
- Shapes 07:02 All New Amazing Sounds (2007)
- Shapes 08:01 (2008)
- Shapes 08:02 (2008 )
- Tru Thoughts 10th Anniversary (2009)
- Shapes 09:01 (2009)
- Unfold Presents Tru Thoughts Covers (2009)
- Shapes 10:01 (2010)
- Tru Thoughts Compilation (2010)
- Shapes 10:02 (2010)
- Shapes 11:01 (2011)
- When Shapes Mix Together)
- Tru Thoughts Disco/Boogie (2012)
- Shapes 12:01 2012)
- Shapes Circles (2013)
- Shapes Rectangles (2014)
- Tru Thoughts Anniversary (2014)
- Shapes Wires (2015)
- Tru Thoughts Covers 2 (2015)
- Shapes: In Space (2016)
- Shapes Kaleidoscope (2017)
- Tru Thoughts 18 (2017)
- Shapes: Mountains (2018)

== See also ==
- List of record labels
- List of independent UK record labels
