= Alice Russell (singer) =

British soul singer (born 1975)

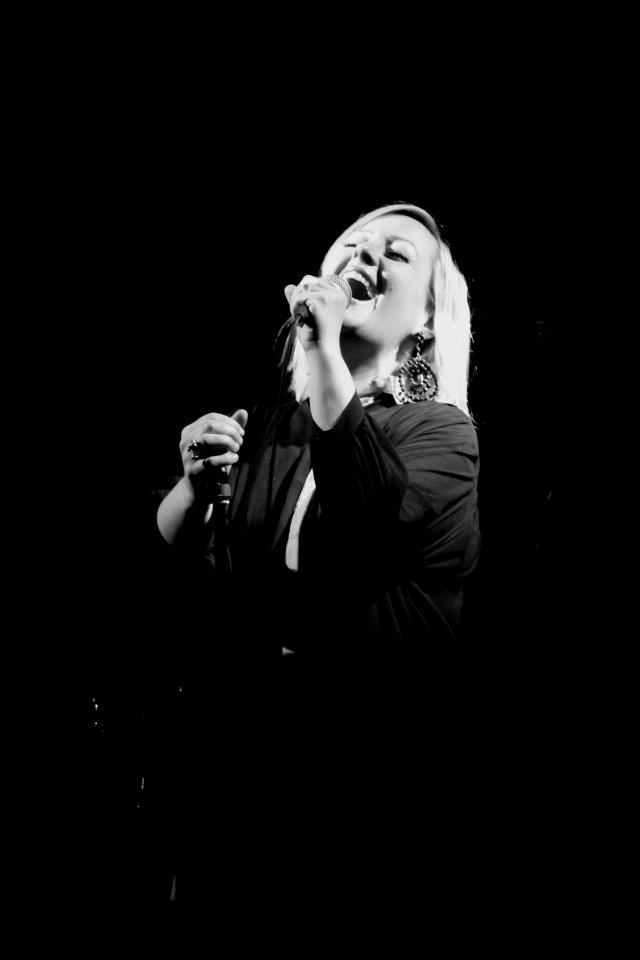
- Alice Russell performing live in 2012

Background information
- Born: 1 March 1975 (age 51); Suffolk, England
- Genres: British soul, funk, nu jazz
- Occupation: Musician
- Instruments: Vocals, cello
- Years active: 2000s–present
- Labels: Tru Thoughts, Six Degrees Records, Little Poppett, Differ-Ant

Alice Russell (born 1 March 1975) is a British soul singer.

== Early life and education ==
Russell is the daughter of an organist, and grew up in Framlingham, Suffolk. At the age of nine, following in her father's and sisters' musical footsteps, Russell began taking lessons on the cello, and sang in choirs, before studying art and music in Brighton from 1994.

As well as the classical influences of her father, and formal music lessons, Russell began finding influence in gospel music and soul artists such as Stevie Wonder and Aretha Franklin from an early age which played a big part in the shaping of her style.

== Career ==
Artists including Minnie Riperton, Eva Cassidy, Chaka Khan and Jill Scott are listed by Russell as influences.

In the early 2000s, she contributed to recordings by Bah Samba, Quantic, TM Juke, Kushti and Nostalgia 77. Her work with Bah Samba infused Latin sounds with tinges of uplifting jazz and funk, whereas her material with the band Kushti contained a more laid back, hip hop and soul inspired sound. Her debut album, Under the Munka Moon was released on Tru Thoughts in 2004, which was an amalgamation of various singles, remixes and collaborations.

In 2005, her debut studio album My Favourite Letters was recorded for Tru Thoughts, created by Russell with co-writer, producer, guitarist and musical friend Alex Cowan (a.k.a. TM Juke).

Her third release, Under the Munka Moon II (Tru Thoughts) in 2006 compiled her most recent collaborations, remixes, and cover versions including an interpretation of the White Stripes' "Seven Nation Army". Russell and TM Juke toured together with chosen sidemen, performing in the UK, Europe, Australia, the United States and elsewhere. In 2006, Russell played on the main stage at The Big Chill, and a DVD featuring a concert recorded Live in Paris came out.

In 2008, Russell released the album, Pot of Gold, on Six Degrees Records in the United States and on her own label Little Poppet in the UK. Russell toured throughout the end of 2008 into 2009, performing shows in Australia, Europe, Canada and America, including the South by South West Music and Media Conference in Austin, Texas in 2009.

Due to the collapse of Pinnacle distribution in 2008, Pot of Gold was re-released in October 2009 on the Little Poppet label, accompanied by the release of the double CD Pot of Gold Remixes album, with mixes by Mr Scruff, DJ Vadim, Emika, Ste Simpson and the Heavy. The releases were supported by European and UK tour dates, that continued in 2010 throughout Europe, including playing a stripped back show at London's Union Chapel.

Russell released the studio album To Dust on Tru Thoughts in February 2013. Her latest album, I Am, issued in April 2024, was her first in a decade.

== Discography ==
=== Albums by Russell ===
- Under the Munka Moon (2004, Tru Thoughts)
- My Favourite Letters (2005, Tru Thoughts)
- Under the Munka Moon II (2006, Tru Thoughts)
- Pot of Gold (2008, Little Poppet/Differ-ant/Six Degrees)
- Pot of Gold Remixes (2009, Little Poppet/Differ-ant/Six Degrees)
- To Dust (2013, Tru Thoughts/Differ-ant)
- I Am (2024, Tru Thoughts)

=== Albums with others ===
- Pushin' On by The Quantic Soul Orchestra
- Look Around the Corner by Quantic & Alice Russell with The Combo Bárbaro (2012, Tru Thoughts)

=== Albums with contributions by Russell ===
- Ninja Tuna (2008) by Mr Scruff – Russell collaborated on "Music Takes Me Up"
- Here Lies Love (2010) by David Byrne and Fatboy Slim – Russell contributes vocals on "Men Will Do Anything"
