= Mexico Ingles Airplay =

Record chart published weekly by Billboard magazine

Mexico Ingles Airplay is a record chart published weekly by Billboard magazine for English-language singles receiving airplay in Mexico. The chart was created in January 2009, with Katy Perry's "Hot n Cold" as the first song to reach the No. 1 position. Three songs by English singer-songwriter Adele peaked at the top of the charts in Mexico and the United States, "Someone like You", "Set Fire to the Rain", and "Hello". Grammy-winning song "We Are Young" by American band fun. featuring Janelle Monáe, was a number-one song in Mexico, the United Kingdom, and the United States after being featured in the TV series Glee and a commercial for Chevrolet that aired during the Super Bowl of 2012. American band Maroon 5 and Scottish DJ Calvin Harris hold the record for most number-one singles in the Mexico Ingles Airplay chart, with seven each.

In 2013, American artist Miley Cyrus spent nine non-consecutive weeks at number-one in the Mexico Ingles Airplay chart with "Wrecking Ball", for which she was awarded the MTV Video Music Award for Video of the Year. "Happy" by American singer-songwriter Pharrell Williams also was a number-one hit in Mexico, received a nomination for an Academy Award for Best Original Song, and was declared the most successful song of 2014, with 13.9 million units sold worldwide, according to the International Federation of the Phonographic Industry. "Boom Clap" by English singer Charli XCX was featured in the 2014 film The Fault in Our Stars and reached number-one in Mexico. The collaborative single by English producer Mark Ronson featuring singer Bruno Mars, titled "Uptown Funk", topped the Mexican chart and ended as the best-performing single of 2015 in the United States. "7 Years" by Danish band Lukas Graham reached number-one in Australia, Mexico and the United Kingdom in 2016. American singer-songwriter Charlie Puth debuted at the top of the chart in November 2017, with the song "How Long".

== Number ones ==
Key
No.	nth song to top the Mexico Ingles Airplay Chart
re	Return of a song to number one

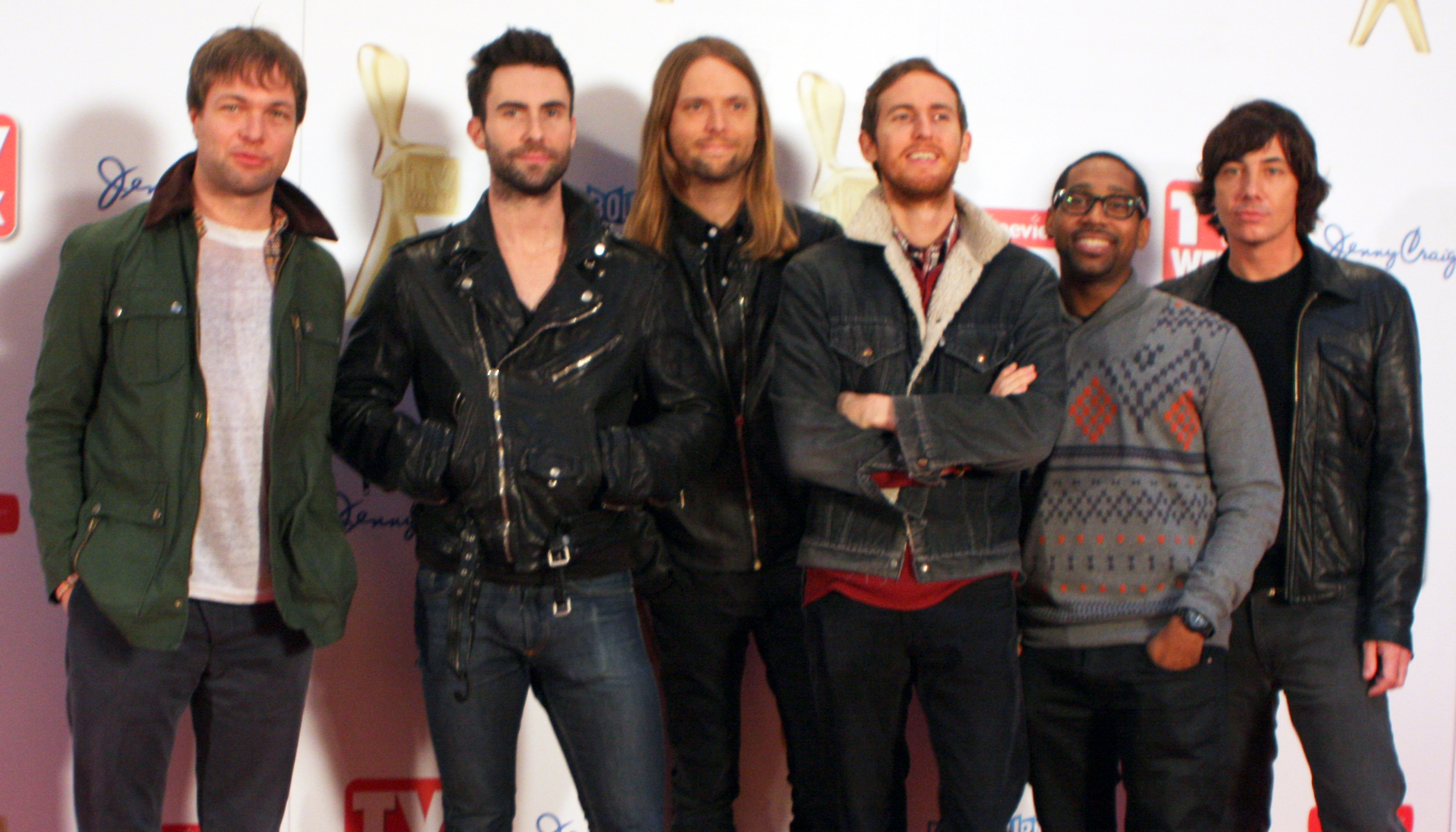
American band Maroon 5, is the ensemble with the most number-one songs in the chart, with seven.

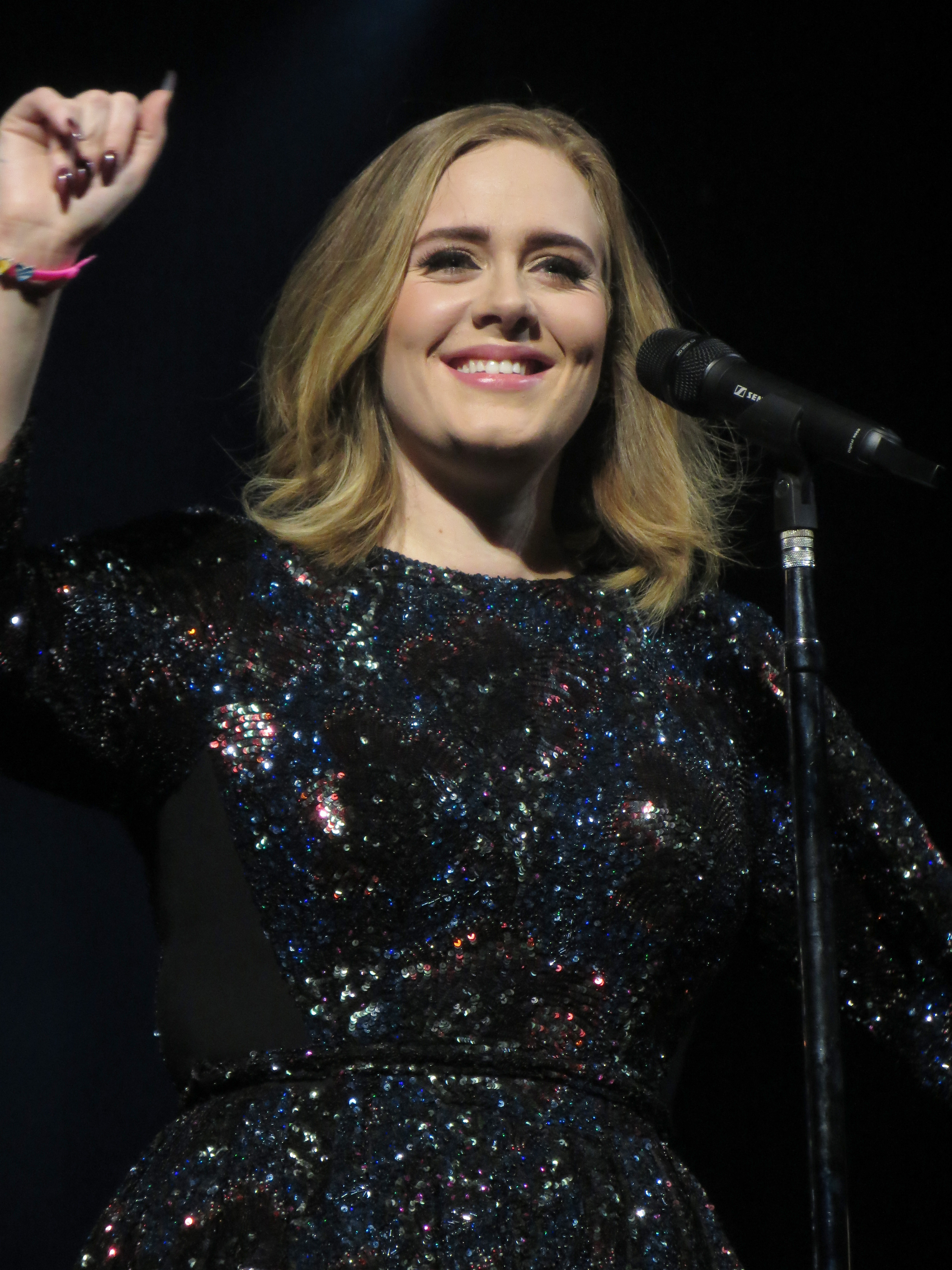
English singer-songwriter Adele (pictured in 2016) has had four number-one singles in the chart.

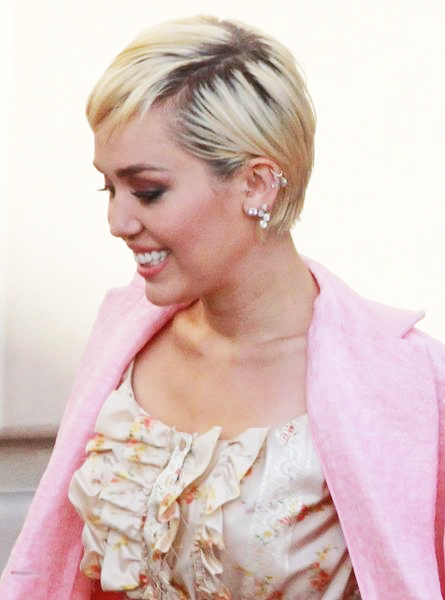
American singer Miley Cyrus (pictured in 2015) reached number-one with "Wrecking Ball" and "Malibu".

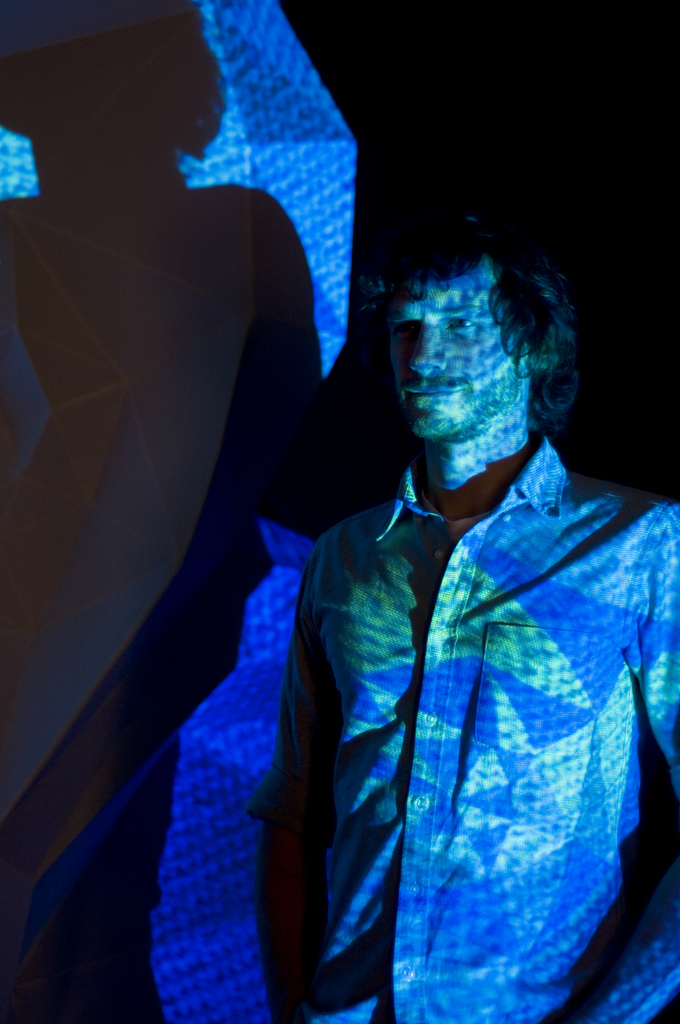
Australian-Belgian artist Gotye (pictured in 2013) spent five weeks a number-one with "Somebody That I Used to Know".

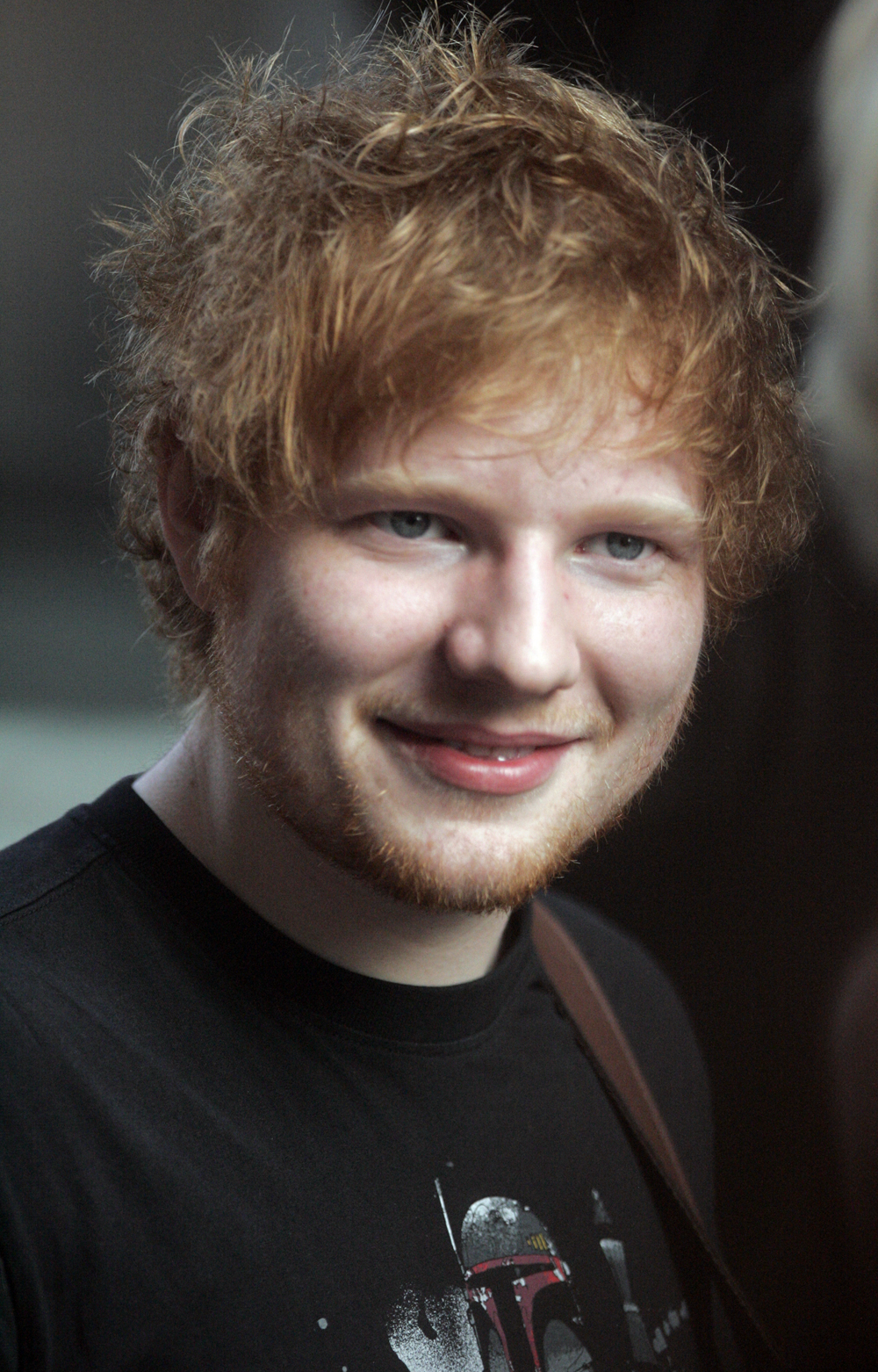
English performer Ed Sheeran (pictured in 2013) reached number-one with "Thinking Out Loud", "Photograph", "Shape of You" and "Perfect".

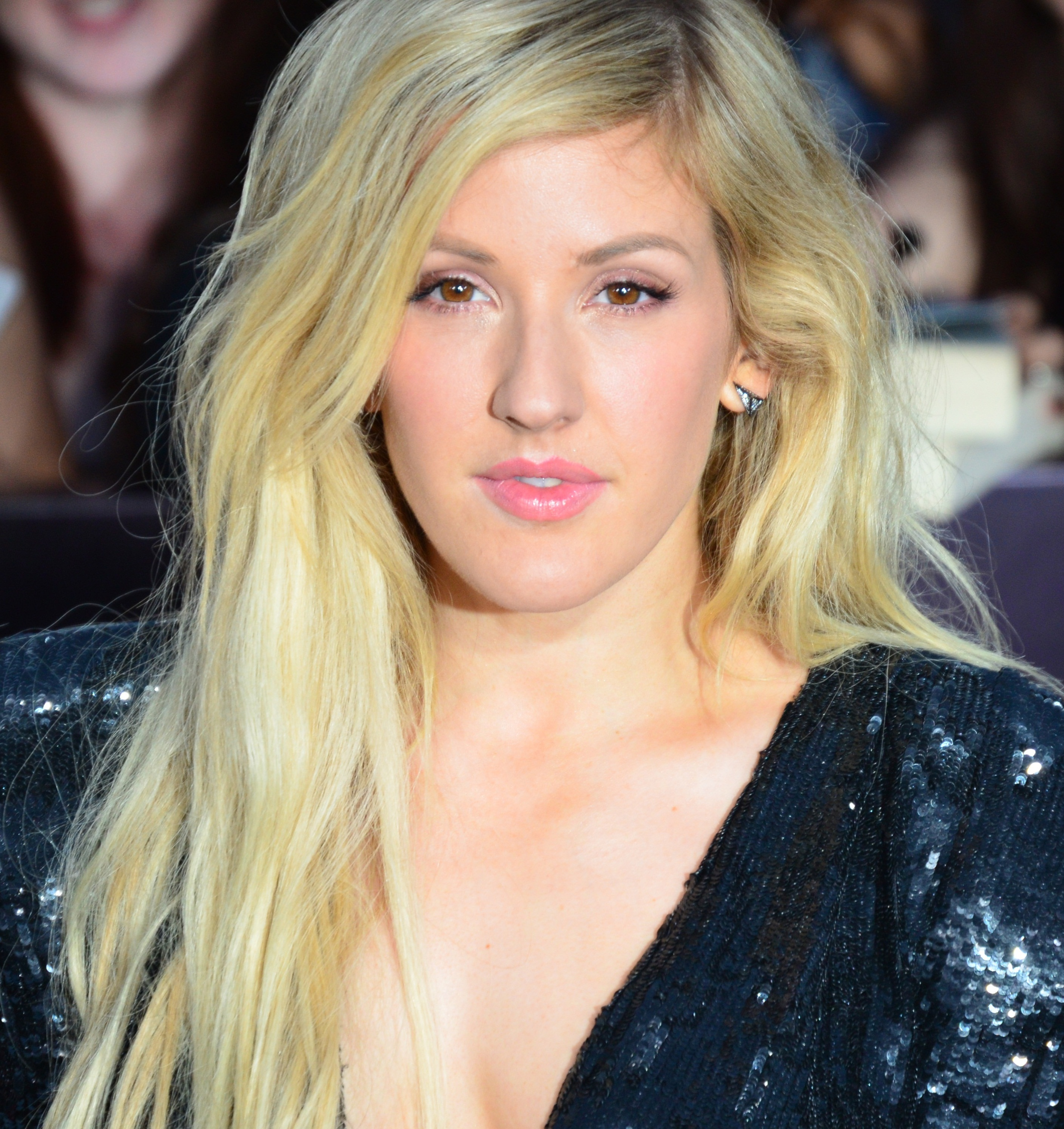
English singer-songwriter Ellie Goulding (pictured in 2014) reached number-one for two non-consecutive weeks with "Love Me like You Do".

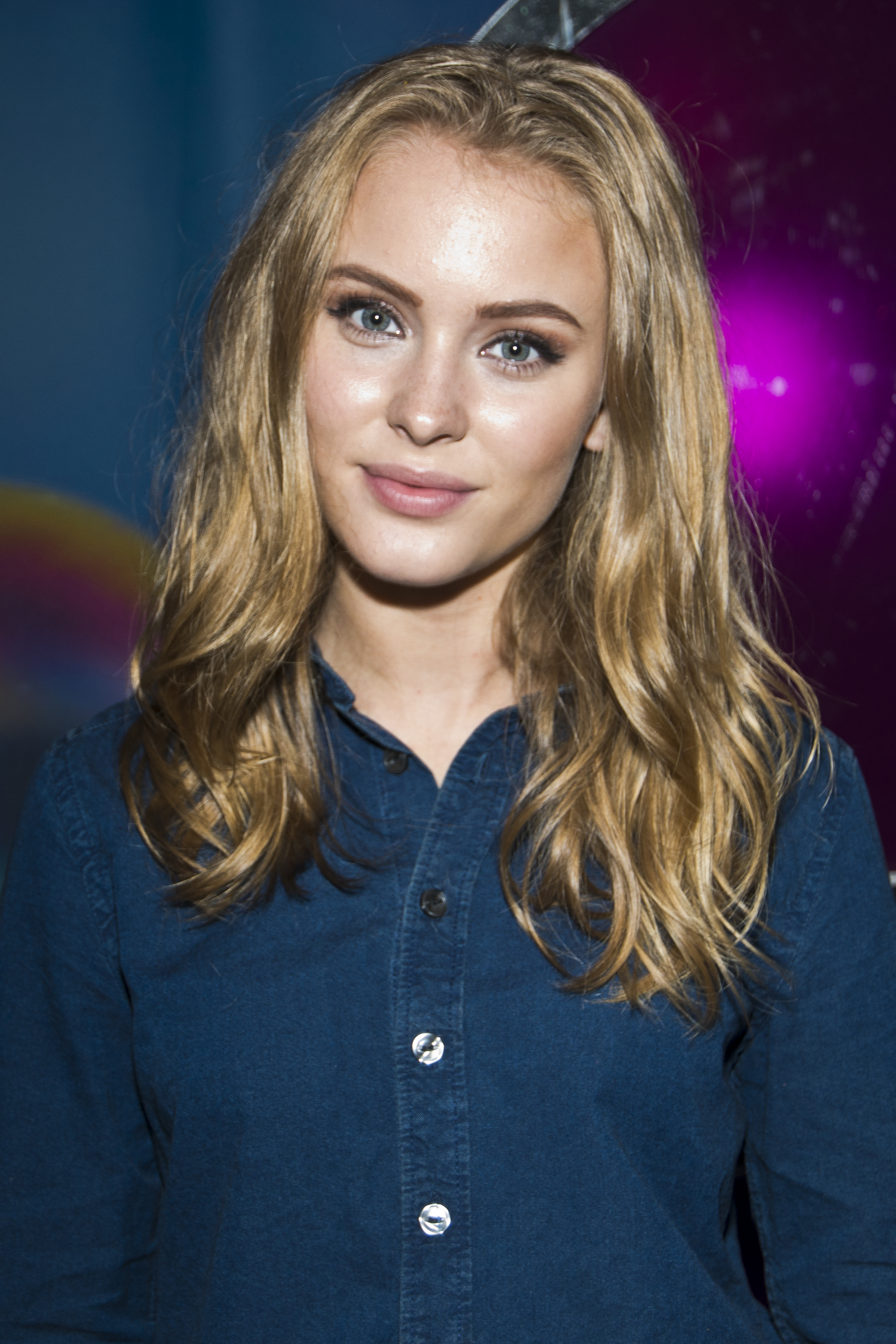
Swedish artist Zara Larsson reached number-one with "Lush Life" in 2016

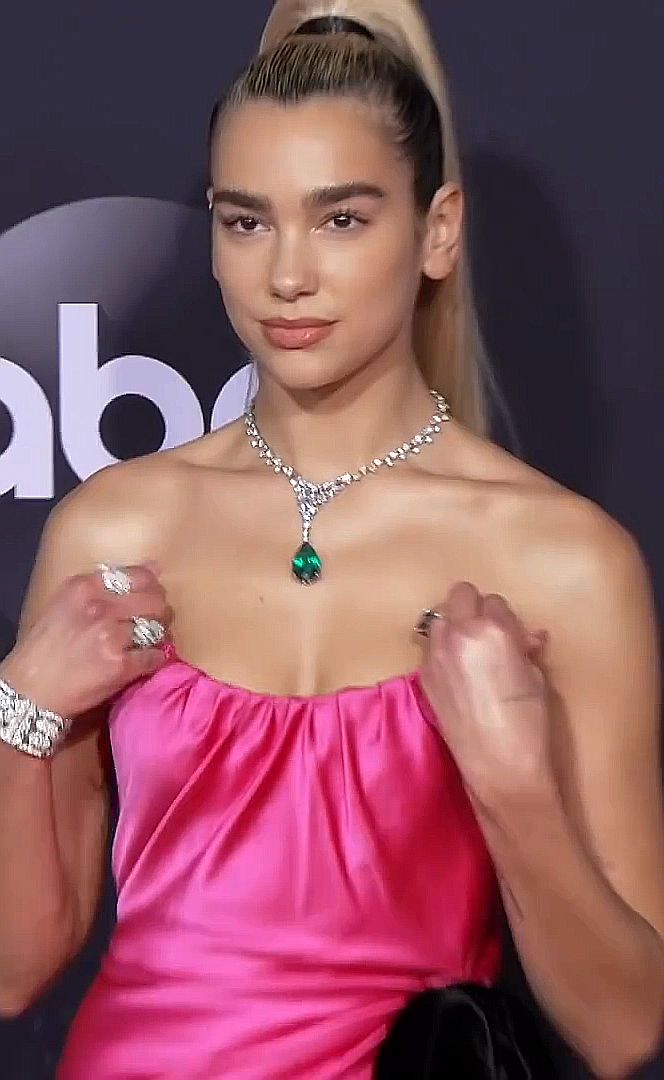
English singer Dua Lipa (pictured in 2019) has reached number-one five times, including three singles from her second studio album Future Nostalgia.

No.	Artist	Single	Reached number one	Weeks at number one	Ref.
2009
1	Katy Perry	"Hot n Cold"	January 17, 2009	3	
2	U2	"Get On Your Boots"	February 7, 2009	1	
re	Katy Perry	"Hot n Cold"	February 14, 2009	1	
re	U2	"Get On Your Boots"	February 21, 2009	4	
3	Kelly Clarkson	"My Life Would Suck Without You"	March 21, 2009	4	
4	Britney Spears	"Circus"	April 18, 2009	3	
5	Green Day	"Know Your Enemy"	May 9, 2009	1	
6	Lady Gaga	"Poker Face"	May 16, 2009	1	
7	Britney Spears	"If U Seek Amy"	May 23, 2009	1	
re	Green Day	"Know Your Enemy"	May 30, 2009	1	
re	Lady Gaga	"Poker Face"	June 6, 2009	1	
re	Britney Spears	"If U Seek Amy"	June 13, 2009	1	
re	Lady Gaga	"Poker Face"	June 20, 2009	1	
re	Britney Spears	"If U Seek Amy"	June 27, 2009	1	
8	Placebo	"For What It's Worth"	July 4, 2009	1	
re	Britney Spears	"If U Seek Amy"	July 18, 2009	2	
re	Lady Gaga	"Poker Face"	July 25, 2009	1	
9	Green Day	"21 Guns"	August 1, 2009	1	
10	Jason Mraz and Colbie Caillat	"Lucky"	August 8, 2009	1	
re	Green Day	"21 Guns"	August 15, 2009	1	
re	Jason Mraz and Colbie Caillat	"Lucky"	August 22, 2009	6	
11	Robbie Williams	"Bodies"	October 3, 2009	1	
12	Shakira	"She Wolf"	October 10, 2009	1	
13	The Black Eyed Peas	"I Gotta Feeling"	October 17, 2009	6	
14	Britney Spears	"3"	November 28, 2009	1	
re	The Black Eyed Peas	"I Gotta Feeling"	December 5, 2009	1	
re	Britney Spears	"3"	December 12, 2009	1	
re	The Black Eyed Peas	"I Gotta Feeling"	December 19, 2009	12	
2010
15	Kesha	"TiK ToK"	March 13, 2010	2	
16	Lady Gaga	"Bad Romance"	March 27, 2010	1	
re	Kesha	"TiK ToK"	April 3, 2010	5	
17	Taio Cruz featuring Ludacris	"Break Your Heart"	May 8, 2010	6	
18	Lady Antebellum	"Need You Now"	June 19, 2010	1	
re	Taio Cruz featuring Ludacris	"Break Your Heart"	June 26, 2010	2	
re	Lady Antebellum	"Need You Now"	July 10, 2010	1	
19	Katy Perry featuring Snoop Dogg	"California Gurls"	July 17, 2010	1	
re	Lady Antebellum	"Need You Now"	July 24, 2010	1	
re	Katy Perry featuring Snoop Dogg	"California Gurls"	July 31, 2010	2	
20	Train	"Hey, Soul Sister"	August 14, 2010	1	
re	Katy Perry featuring Snoop Dogg	"California Gurls"	August 21, 2010	1	
21	B.o.B featuring Bruno Mars	"Nothin' on You"	August 28, 2010	1	
re	Katy Perry featuring Snoop Dogg	"California Gurls"	September 4, 2010	3	
22	Yolanda Be Cool and DCUP	"We No Speak Americano"	September 25, 2010	2	
23	Lady Gaga	"Alejandro"	October 9, 2010	3	
24	Bruno Mars	"Just the Way You Are"	October 30, 2010	1	
re	Lady Gaga	"Alejandro"	November 6, 2010	1	
re	Bruno Mars	"Just the Way You Are"	November 13, 2010	5	
25	The Black Eyed Peas	"The Time (Dirty Bit)"	December 18, 2010	1	
re	Bruno Mars	"Just the Way You Are"	December 25, 2010	3	
2011
26	Usher featuring Pitbull	"DJ Got Us Fallin' in Love"	January 15, 2011	1	
re	Bruno Mars	"Just the Way You Are"	January 22, 2011	2	
27	Flo Rida featuring David Guetta	"Club Can't Handle Me"	February 5, 2011	1	
28	Katy Perry	"Firework"	February 12, 2011	1	
re	Flo Rida featuring David Guetta	"Club Can't Handle Me"	February 19, 2011	1	
re	Katy Perry	"Firework"	February 26, 2011	1	
re	Flo Rida featuring David Guetta	"Club Can't Handle Me"	March 5, 2011	1	
29	Rihanna	"Only Girl (In the World)"	March 12, 2011	1	
re	Katy Perry	"Firework"	March 19, 2011	1	
re	The Black Eyed Peas	"The Time (Dirty Bit)"	March 26, 2011	2	
re	Flo Rida featuring David Guetta	"Club Can't Handle Me"	April 9, 2011	1	
re	Rihanna	"Only Girl (In the World)"	April 16, 2011	1	
re	Katy Perry	"Firework"	April 23, 2011	3	
30	Lady Gaga	"Born This Way"	May 14, 2011	4	
re	Katy Perry	"Firework"	June 11, 2011	1	
31	Martin Solveig & Dragonette	"Hello"	June 18, 2011	2	
32	Adele	"Rolling in the Deep"	July 2, 2011	1	
re	The Black Eyed Peas	"The Time (Dirty Bit)"	July 9, 2011	1	
re	Martin Solveig & Dragonette	"Hello"	July 16, 2011	8	
33	Pitbull featuring Ne-Yo, Afrojack and Nayer	"Give Me Everything"	September 10, 2011	1	
34	LMFAO featuring Lauren Bennett and GoonRock	"Party Rock Anthem"	September 17, 2011	5	
35	Alexandra Stan	"Mr. Saxobeat"	October 22, 2011	2	
re	LMFAO featuring Lauren Bennett and GoonRock	"Party Rock Anthem"	November 5, 2011	1	
36	Maroon 5 featuring Christina Aguilera	"Moves like Jagger"	November 12, 2011	1	
37	Foster the People	"Pumped Up Kicks"	November 19, 2011	3	
38	Adele	"Someone like You"	December 10, 2011	1	
re	Maroon 5 featuring Christina Aguilera	"Moves like Jagger"	December 17, 2011	1	
re	Foster the People	"Pumped Up Kicks"	December 24, 2011	7	
2012
39	Coldplay	"Paradise"	February 11, 2012	1	
re	Foster the People	"Pumped Up Kicks"	February 18, 2012	1	
40	Rihanna featuring Calvin Harris	"We Found Love"	February 25, 2012	2	
41	fun. featuring Janelle Monáe	"We Are Young"	March 10, 2012	1	
42	Adele	"Set Fire to the Rain"	March 17, 2012	1	
re	fun. featuring Janelle Monáe	"We Are Young"	March 24, 2012	1	
43	Gotye featuring Kimbra	"Somebody That I Used to Know"	March 31, 2012	1	
44	Flo Rida	"Good Feeling"	April 7, 2012	1	
re	Gotye featuring Kimbra	"Somebody That I Used to Know"	April 14, 2012	1	
re	Adele	"Set Fire to the Rain"	April 21, 2012	2	
45	Selena Gomez & the Scene	"Love You like a Love Song"	May 5, 2012	1	
re	Rihanna featuring Calvin Harris	"We Found Love"	May 12, 2012	1	
re	Selena Gomez & the Scene	"Love You like a Love Song"	May 19, 2012	1	
46	Katy Perry	"Part of Me"	May 26, 2012	1	
re	fun. featuring Janelle Monáe	"We Are Young"	June 2, 2012	7	
re	Gotye featuring Kimbra	"Somebody That I Used to Know"	July 21, 2012	1	
re	fun. featuring Janelle Monáe	"We Are Young"	July 28, 2012	1	
re	Gotye featuring Kimbra	"Somebody That I Used to Know"	August 4, 2012	1	
47	Maroon 5 featuring Wiz Khalifa	"Payphone"	August 11, 2012	4	
re	Gotye featuring Kimbra	"Somebody That I Used to Know"	September 8, 2012	1	
48	David Guetta featuring Sia	"Titanium"	September 15, 2012	4	
49	Psy	"Gangnam Style"	October 13, 2012	1	
re	David Guetta featuring Sia	"Titanium"	October 20, 2012	4	
50	fun.	"Some Nights"	November 17, 2012	1	
51	Of Monsters and Men	"Little Talks"	November 24, 2012	3	
re	David Guetta featuring Sia	"Titanium"	December 15, 2012	1	
52	Rihanna	"Diamonds"	December 22, 2012	1	
53	Bruno Mars	"Locked Out of Heaven"	December 29, 2012	10	
2013
re	Rihanna	"Diamonds"	March 9, 2013	1	
re	Bruno Mars	"Locked Out of Heaven"	March 16, 2013	2	
54	P!nk featuring Nate Ruess	"Just Give Me a Reason"	March 30, 2013	1	
re	Bruno Mars	"Locked Out of Heaven"	April 6, 2013	3	
55	will.i.am featuring Justin Bieber	"#thatPOWER"	April 6, 2013	1	
re	Bruno Mars	"Locked Out of Heaven"	May 4, 2013	1	
56	fun.	"Carry On"	May 11, 2013	1	
57	Daft Punk featuring Pharrell Williams	"Get Lucky"	May 18, 2013	6	
58	Robin Thicke featuring T.I. and Pharrell Williams	"Blurred Lines"	June 29, 2013	2	
re	Daft Punk featuring Pharrell Williams	"Get Lucky"	July 13, 2013	1	
59	Macklemore & Ryan Lewis featuring Ray Dalton	"Can't Hold Us"	July 20, 2013	1	
re	Daft Punk featuring Pharrell Williams	"Get Lucky"	July 27, 2013	1	
re	Robin Thicke featuring T.I. and Pharrell Williams	"Blurred Lines"	August 3, 2013	1	
re	Daft Punk featuring Pharrell Williams	"Get Lucky"	August 10, 2013	2	
60	Avicii	"Wake Me Up!"	August 24, 2013	1	
61	Bruno Mars	"Treasure"	August 31, 2013	1	
62	Selena Gomez	"Come & Get It"	September 7, 2013	1	
re	Avicii	"Wake Me Up!"	September 14, 2013	1	
63	Capital Cities	"Safe and Sound"	September 21, 2013	1	
re	Avicii	"Wake Me Up!"	September 28, 2013	1	
64	Katy Perry	"Roar"	October 5, 2013	1	
re	Capital Cities	"Safe and Sound"	October 12, 2013	1	
re	Bruno Mars	"Treasure"	October 19, 2013	2	
65	Miley Cyrus	"Wrecking Ball"	November 2, 2013	4	
66	Passenger	"Let Her Go"	November 30, 2013	3	
re	Miley Cyrus	"Wrecking Ball"	December 21, 2013	5	
2014
67	OneRepublic	"Counting Stars"	January 25, 2014	7	
68	American Authors	"Best Day of My Life"	March 15, 2014	1	
re	OneRepublic	"Counting Stars"	March 22, 2014	1	
69	Pharrell Williams	"Happy"	March 29, 2014	2	
re	OneRepublic	"Counting Stars"	April 12, 2014	3	
re	American Authors	"Best Day of My Life"	May 3, 2014	1	
re	OneRepublic	"Counting Stars"	May 10, 2014	3	
70	Sigma	"Nobody to Love"	May 31, 2014	2	
re	OneRepublic	"Counting Stars"	June 14, 2014	1	
re	American Authors	"Best Day of My Life"	June 21, 2014	3	
re	Sigma	"Nobody to Love"	July 12, 2014	2	
re	American Authors	"Best Day of My Life"	July 19, 2014	3	
71	Charli XCX	"Boom Clap"	August 9, 2014	1	
72	Kiesza	"Hideaway"	August 16, 2014	1	
73	Tiësto featuring Matthew Koma	"Wasted"	August 23, 2014	1	
re	Charli XCX	"Boom Clap"	August 30, 2014	2	
74	Lillywood & Robin Schulz	"Prayer in C"	September 13, 2014	2	
75	Magic!	"Rude"	September 27, 2014	7	
76	Meghan Trainor	"All About That Bass"	November 15, 2014	3	
77	Calvin Harris featuring John Newman	"Blame"	December 6, 2014	2	
re	Meghan Trainor	"All About That Bass"	December 20, 2014	2	
2015
re	Calvin Harris featuring John Newman	"Blame"	January 3, 2015	1	
78	Mark Ronson featuring Bruno Mars	"Uptown Funk!"	January 10, 2015	1	
79	Sam Smith	"I'm Not the Only One"	January 17, 2015	1	
re	Lillywood & Robin Schulz	"Prayer in C"	January 24, 2015	1	
re	Mark Ronson featuring Bruno Mars	"Uptown Funk!"	January 31, 2015	5	
80	Ellie Goulding	"Love Me like You Do"	March 7, 2015	1	
re	Sam Smith	"I'm Not the Only One"	March 14, 2015	2	
81	Ed Sheeran	"Thinking Out Loud"	March 28, 2015	1	
re	Mark Ronson featuring Bruno Mars	"Uptown Funk!"	April 4, 2015	1	
82	Sheppard	"Geronimo"	April 11, 2015	1	
83	Hozier	"Take Me to Church"	April 18, 2015	1	
re	Mark Ronson featuring Bruno Mars	"Uptown Funk!"	April 25, 2015	1	
84	Maroon 5	"Sugar"	May 2, 2015	1	
re	Ellie Goulding	"Love Me like You Do"	May 9, 2015	1	
85	Wiz Khalifa featuring Charlie Puth	"See You Again"	May 16, 2015	1	
re	Maroon 5	"Sugar"	May 23, 2015	1	
86	OMI	"Cheerleader"	May 30, 2015	1	
re	Wiz Khalifa featuring Charlie Puth	"See You Again"	June 6, 2015	2	
87	Major Lazer and DJ Snake featuring MØ	"Lean On"	June 20, 2015	1	
88	John Newman	"Come and Get It"	June 27, 2015	1	
re	Wiz Khalifa featuring Charlie Puth	"See You Again"	July 4, 2015	1	
89	Maroon 5	"This Summer's Gonna Hurt like a Motherfucker"	July 11, 2015	1	
re	OMI	"Cheerleader"	July 18, 2015	1	
90	Jason Derulo	"Want to Want Me"	July 25, 2015	2	
91	Ed Sheeran	"Photograph"	August 8, 2015	1	
92	The Weeknd	"Can't Feel My Face"	August 15, 2015	3	
re	OMI featuring Nicky Jam	"Cheerleader"	September 5, 2015	1	
re	The Weeknd	"Can't Feel My Face"	September 12, 2015	1	
93	Galantis	"Peanut Butter Jelly"	September 19, 2015	2	
94	Felix Jaehn featuring Jasmine Thompson	"Ain't Nobody (Loves Me Better)"	September 19, 2015	1	
re	Ed Sheeran	"Photograph"	October 10, 2015	1	
95	Macklemore & Ryan Lewis featuring Eric Nally, Melle Mel, Kool Moe Dee & Grandmaster Caz	"Downtown"	October 17, 2015	1	
96	R. City featuring Adam Levine	"Locked Away"	October 24, 2015	1	
re	Ed Sheeran	"Photograph"	October 31, 2015	2	
97	Calvin Harris & Disciples	"How Deep is Your Love"	November 14, 2015	2	
98	Lost Frequencies featuring Janieck Devy	"Reality"	November 28, 2015	1	
re	Calvin Harris & Disciples	"How Deep is Your Love"	December 5, 2015	1	
99	Adele	"Hello"	December 12, 2015	1	
100	Elle King	"Ex's & Oh's"	December 19, 2015	5	
2016
re	Lost Frequencies featuring Janieck Devy	"Reality"	January 23, 2016	1	
101	Coldplay	"Adventure of a Lifetime"	January 30, 2016	1	
re	Lost Frequencies featuring Janieck Devy	"Reality"	February 6, 2016	2	
re	Coldplay	"Adventure of a Lifetime"	February 20, 2016	4	
102	DNCE	"Cake by the Ocean"	March 19, 2016	1	
103	Lukas Graham	"7 Years"	March 26, 2016	1	
104	99 Souls featuring Destiny's Child and Brandy	"The Girl is Mine"	April 2, 2016	1	
re	DNCE	"Cake by the Ocean"	April 9, 2016	1	
105	Twenty One Pilots	"Stressed Out"	April 9, 2016	1	
re	DNCE	"Cake by the Ocean"	April 23, 2016	1	
re	Twenty One Pilots	"Stressed Out"	April 30, 2016	1	
106	Meghan Trainor	"No"	May 7, 2016	1	
107	Zara Larsson	"Lush Life"	May 14, 2016	1	
108	Sigala featuring John Newman & Nile Rodgers	"Give Me Your Love"	May 21, 2016	2	
109	Justin Timberlake	"Can't Stop the Feeling!"	June 4, 2016	1	
re	Sigala featuring John Newman & Nile Rodgers	"Give Me Your Love"	June 11, 2016	1	
re	Justin Timberlake	"Can't Stop the Feeling!"	June 18, 2016	1	
110	Kungs vs Cookin' on 3 Burners	"This Girl"	June 25, 2016	1	
111	David Guetta featuring Zara Larsson	"This One's For You"	July 2, 2016	1	
re	Kungs vs Cookin' on 3 Burners	"This Girl"	July 9, 2016	3	
112	Twenty One Pilots	"Ride"	July 30, 2016	2	
113	Sak Noel & Salvi featuring Sean Paul	"Trumpets"	August 13, 2016	1	
re	Kungs vs Cookin' on 3 Burners	"This Girl"	August 20, 2016	1	
re	Sak Noel & Salvi featuring Sean Paul	"Trumpets"	August 27, 2016	2	
114	Calum Scott	"Dancing On My Own"	September 10, 2016	3	
115	Jonas Blue featuring JP Cooper	"Perfect Strangers"	October 1, 2016	1	
re	Calum Scott	"Dancing On My Own"	October 8, 2016	1	
116	Kungs featuring Jamie N Commons	"Don't You Know"	October 15, 2016	2	
117	Sia featuring Kendrick Lamar	"The Greatest"	October 29, 2016	1	
118	Bruno Mars	"24K Magic"	November 5, 2016	1	
119	The Weeknd featuring Daft Punk	"Starboy"	November 12, 2016	1	
120	Maroon 5 featuring Kendrick Lamar	"Don't Wanna Know"	November 19, 2016	1	
121	Clean Bandit featuring Sean Paul and Anne-Marie	"Rockabye"	November 26, 2016	1	
122	Alok, Bruno Martini featuring Zeeba	"Hear Me Now"	December 3, 2016	1	
re	Clean Bandit featuring Sean Paul and Anne-Marie	"Rockabye"	December 10, 2016	1	
re	Alok, Bruno Martini featuring Zeeba	"Hear Me Now"	December 17, 2016	1	
re	The Weeknd featuring Daft Punk	"Starboy"	December 24, 2016	1	
re	Clean Bandit featuring Sean Paul and Anne-Marie	"Rockabye"	December 31, 2016	1	
2017
123	The Weeknd featuring Daft Punk	"I Feel It Coming"	January 7, 2017	2	
124	Hailee Steinfeld & Grey featuring Zedd	"Starving"	January 21, 2017	1	
re	Clean Bandit featuring Sean Paul and Anne-Marie	"Rockabye"	January 28, 2017	2	
re	Alok, Bruno Martini featuring Zeeba	"Hear Me Now"	February 11, 2017	1	
re	The Weeknd featuring Daft Punk	"I Feel It Coming"	February 18, 2017	1	
125	Sia	"Move Your Body"	February 25, 2017	1	
126	Ed Sheeran	"Shape of You"	March 4, 2017	1	
127	Burak Yeter featuring Danelle Sandoval	"Tuesday"	March 11, 2017	1	
128	Katy Perry featuring Skip Marley	"Chained to the Rhythm"	March 18, 2017	1	
re	Ed Sheeran	"Shape of You"	March 25, 2017	1	
129	Ofenbach	"Be Mine"	April 1, 2017	5	
130	Harry Styles	"Sign of the Times"	May 6, 2017	3	
re	Ofenbach	"Be Mine"	May 27, 2017	1	
131	Alok, Bruno Martini featuring Zeeba	"Never Let Me Go"	June 3, 2017	1	
132	Charlie Puth	"Attention"	June 10, 2017	1	
re	Alok, Bruno Martini featuring Zeeba	"Never Let Me Go"	June 17, 2017	1	
133	Miley Cyrus	"Malibu"	June 24, 2017	1	
re	Charlie Puth	"Attention"	July 1, 2017	1	
134	Katy Perry featuring Nicki Minaj	"Swish Swish"	July 8, 2017	1	
135	Clean Bandit featuring Zara Larsson	"Symphony"	July 15, 2017	1	
136	Portugal. The Man	"Feel It Still"	July 22, 2017	2	
137	DJ Khaled featuring Rihanna & Bryson Tiller	"Wild Thoughts"	August 5, 2017	1	
138	Calvin Harris featuring Pharrell Williams, Katy Perry & Big Sean	"Feels"	August 12, 2017	1	
re	DJ Khaled featuring Rihanna & Bryson Tiller	"Wild Thoughts"	August 19, 2017	1	
re	Portugal. The Man	"Feel It Still"	August 26, 2017	1	
re	Calvin Harris featuring Pharrell Williams, Katy Perry & Big Sean	"Feels"	September 2, 2017	1	
re	Portugal. The Man	"Feel It Still"	September 9, 2017	1	
139	P!nk	"What About Us"	September 16, 2017	1	
140	Justin Bieber + BloodPop	"Friends"	September 16, 2017	1	
141	U2	"You're the Best Thing About Me"	September 30, 2017	1	
re	P!nk	"What About Us"	October 7, 2017	2	
re	U2	"You're the Best Thing About Me"	October 21, 2017	1	
142	Zayn featuring Sia	"Dusk Till Dawn"	October 28, 2017	1	
143	Maroon 5 featuring SZA	"What Lovers Do"	November 4, 2017	1	
144	Charlie Puth	"How Long"	November 11, 2017	1	
145	Ofenbach Vs. Nick Waterhouse	"Katchi"	November 18, 2017	1	
re	Portugal. The Man	"Feel It Still"	November 25, 2017	2	
146	Camila Cabello featuring Young Thug	"Havana"	December 9, 2017	1	
re	Maroon 5 featuring SZA	"What Lovers Do"	December 16, 2017	1	
147	Rita Ora	"Anywhere"	December 23, 2017	1	
re	Portugal. The Man	"Feel It Still"	December 30, 2017	1	
2018
re	Rita Ora	"Anywhere"	January 3, 2018	1	
148	Kygo featuring The Night Game	"Kids in Love"	January 6, 2018	1	
149	Selena Gomez X Marshmello	"Wolves"	January 13, 2018	1	
150	Ed Sheeran	"Perfect"	January 20, 2018	1	
re	Rita Ora	"Anywhere"	January 27, 2018	2	
151	Liam Payne & Rita Ora	"For You (Fifty Shades Freed)"	February 20, 2018	1	
152	Rudimental featuring Jess Glynne, Macklemore & Dan Caplen	"These Days"	February 27, 2018	5	
153	Kendrick Lamar & SZA	"All the Stars"	March 24, 2018	1	
re	Rudimental featuring Jess Glynne, Macklemore & Dan Caplen	"These Days"	March 31, 2018	2	
re	Rita Ora	"Anywhere"	April 14, 2018	1	
re	Rudimental featuring Jess Glynne, Macklemore & Dan Caplen	"These Days"	April 21, 2018	1	
154	Alice Merton	"No Roots"	April 28, 2018	4	
155	Calvin Harris & Dua Lipa	"One Kiss"	May 26, 2018	1	
156	Janieck	"Does It Matter"	June 2, 20187	2	
157	BTS	"Fake Love"	June 16, 2018	1	
158	Clean Bandit featuring Demi Lovato	"Solo"	June 23, 2018	1	
159	David Guetta & Sia	"Flames"	June 30, 2018	1	
160	Maroon 5 featuring Cardi B	"Girls Like You"	July 7, 2018	1	
re	Clean Bandit featuring Demi Lovato	"Solo"	July 14, 2018	1	
161	Kygo & Imagine Dragons	"Born to Be Yours"	July 21, 2018	1	
re	Janieck	"Does It Matter"	July 28, 2018	1	
162	MARUV & Boosin	"Drunk Groove"	August 4, 2018	1	
re	Kygo & Imagine Dragons	"Born to Be Yours"	August 11, 2018	1	
re	Maroon 5 featuring Cardi B	"Girls Like You"	August 18, 2018	1	
163	Purple Disco Machine	"Dished (Male Stripper)"	August 25, 2018	2	
164	Calvin Harris & Sam Smith	"Promises"	September 8, 2018	1	
165	Drake	"In My Feelings"	September 15, 2018	1	
166	John Mayer	"New Light"	September 22, 2018	1	
167	Dynoro & Gigi D'Agostino	"In My Mind"	September 29, 2018	1	
168	lovelytheband	"Broken"	October 6, 2018	2	
re	Dynoro & Gigi D'Agostino	"In My Mind"	October 20, 2018	1	
re	John Mayer	"New Light"	October 27, 2018	1	
169	Panic! at the Disco	"High Hopes"	November 3, 2018	1	
170	ZAZ	"Qué Vendrá"	November 10, 2018	2	
171	Post Malone & Swae Lee	"Sunflower (Spider-Man: Into The Spider-Verse)"	November 24, 2018	1	
172	Clean Bandit featuring Marina and the Diamonds and Luis Fonsi	"Baby"	December 1, 2018	1	
re	Post Malone & Swae Lee	"Sunflower (Spider-Man: Into The Spider-Verse)"	December 8, 2018	2	
173	Los Unidades & Pharrell Williams featuring Jozzy	"E-Lo"	December 22, 2018	1	
re	Post Malone & Swae Lee	"Sunflower (Spider-Man: Into The Spider-Verse)"	December 29, 2018	1	
2019
re	Panic! at the Disco	"High Hopes"	January 5, 2019	1	
re	Post Malone & Swae Lee	"Sunflower (Spider-Man: Into The Spider-Verse)"	January 12, 2019	1	
174	Mark Ronson featuring Miley Cyrus	"Nothing Breaks Like a Heart"	January 19, 2019	1	
re	Post Malone & Swae Lee	"Sunflower (Spider-Man: Into The Spider-Verse)"	January 26, 2019	1	
175	Sam Smith & Normani	"Dancing with a Stranger"	February 2, 2019	1	
176	CamelPhat X Christoph featuring Jem Cooke	"Breathe"	February 9, 2019	2	
177	Dua Lipa	"Swan Song"	February 23, 2019	1	
178	Calvin Harris featuring Rag'n'Bone Man	"Giant"	March 2, 2019	1	
re	Dua Lipa	"Swan Song"	March 9, 2019	1	
179	Passenger	"Survivors"	March 16, 2019	1	
180	Jonas Brothers	"Sucker"	March 23, 2019	1	
re	Calvin Harris featuring Rag'n'Bone Man	"Giant"	March 30, 2019	1	
181	Gesaffelstein & Pharrell Williams	"Blast Off"	April 6, 2019	1	
re	Sam Smith & Normani	"Dancing with a Stranger"	April 13, 2019	1	
182	Billie Eilish	"Bad Guy"	April 20, 2019	1	
183	Meduza featuring GOODBOYS	"Piece of Your Heart"	April 27, 2019	2	
184	Twenty One Pilots	"Chlorine"	May 11, 2019	1	
185	Taylor Swift featuring Brendon Urie	"ME!"	May 18, 2019	1	
186	Ed Sheeran & Justin Bieber	"I Don't Care"	May 25, 2019	1	
re	Meduza featuring GOODBOYS	"Piece of Your Heart"	June 1, 2019	1	
re	Ed Sheeran & Justin Bieber	"I Don't Care"	June 8, 2019	1	
187	Sam Feldt featuring RANI	"Post Malone"	June 15, 2019	1	
188	Lil Nas X featuring Billy Ray Cyrus	"Old Town Road"	June 22, 2019	1	
189	Avicii	"Heaven"	June 29, 2019	2	
re	Ed Sheeran & Justin Bieber	"I Don't Care"	July 13, 2019	2	
190	Shawn Mendes & Camila Cabello	"Señorita"	July 27, 2019	2	
191	Sam Smith	"How Do You Sleep?"	August 3, 2019	1	
192	Taylor Swift	"You Need to Calm Down"	August 10, 2019	1	
re	Shawn Mendes & Camila Cabello	"Señorita"	August 17, 2019	2	
193	Lewis Capaldi	"Someone You Loved"	August 31, 2019	1	
194	DJ Regard	"Ride It."	September 7, 2019	2	
195	Sam Fender	"Will We Talk?"	September 21, 2019	1	
re	DJ Regard	"Ride It."	September 28, 2019	1	
196	Riton and Oliver Heldens featuring Vula	"Turn Me On"	October 5, 2019	2	
197	Foals	"In Degrees"	October 19, 2019	1	
198	Tones and I	"Dance Monkey"	October 26, 2019	1	
re	Foals	"In Degrees"	November 2, 2019	1	
199	Coldplay	"Orphans"	November 9, 2019	1	
re	Tones and I	"Dance Monkey"	November 16, 2019	1	
200	Sam Smith	"I Feel Love"	November 23, 2019	3	
201	Post Malone	"Circles"	December 14, 2019	2	
202	The Weeknd	"Blinding Lights"	December 28, 2019	1	
2020
re	Post Malone	"Circles"	January 4, 2020	2	
re	Tones and I	"Dance Monkey"	January 18, 2020	1	
re	Post Malone	"Circles"	January 25, 2020	1	
re	The Weeknd	"Blinding Lights"	February 1, 2020	1	
re	DJ Regard	"Ride It."	February 8, 2020	1	
re	Post Malone	"Circles"	February 15, 2020	1	
re	Tones and I	"Dance Monkey"	February 22, 2020	1	
203	Dua Lipa	"Physical"	February 29, 2020	1	
re	The Weeknd	"Blinding Lights"	March 7, 2020	1	
204	Doja Cat	"Say So"	March 14, 2020	1	
205	Saint Jhn	"Roses (Imanbek Remix)"	March 21, 2020	1	
re	Doja Cat	"Say So"	March 28, 2020	1	
re	Saint Jhn	"Roses (Imanbek Remix)"	April 6, 2020	1	
206	The Killers	"Caution"	April 11, 2020	1	
207	Dua Lipa	"Break My Heart"	April 18, 2020	1	
re	Saint Jhn	"Roses (Imanbek Remix)"	April 25, 2020	2	
208	HOSH & 1979 featuring Jalja	"Midnight (The Hanging Tree)"	May 9, 2020	2	
209	Dua Lipa	"Don't Start Now"	May 23, 2020	1	
re	HOSH & 1979 featuring Jalja	"Midnight (The Hanging Tree)"	May 30, 2020	1	
210	Conkarah featuring Shaggy	"Banana"	June 6, 2020	1	
211	Powfu featuring beabadoobee	"Death Bed (Coffee for Your Head)"	June 13, 2020	1	
212	Surf Mesa featuring Emilee	"ily"	June 20, 2020	1	
re	Doja Cat	"Say So"	June 27, 2020	3	
213	Topic and A7S	"Breaking Me"	July 18, 2020	1	
214	BENEE featuring Gus Dapperton	"Supalonely"	July 25, 2020	1	
re	Conkarah featuring Shaggy	"Banana"	August 1, 2020	1	
215	Jawsh 685 x Jason Derulo	"Savage Love (Laxed – Siren Beat)"	August 8, 2020	1	
re	Topic and A7S	"Breaking Me"	August 15, 2020	1	
re	Jawsh 685 x Jason Derulo	"Savage Love (Laxed – Siren Beat)"	August 22, 2020	4	
216	Joel Corry x MNEK	"Head & Heart"	September 19, 2020	1	
re	Topic and A7S	"Breaking Me"	September 26, 2020	1	
re	Joel Corry x MNEK	"Head & Heart"	October 3, 2020	2	
re	The Weeknd	"Blinding Lights"	October 17, 2020	1	
re	Topic and A7S	"Breaking Me"	October 24, 2020	3	
217	Sam Smith	"Diamonds"	November 14, 2020	1	
re	Topic and A7S	"Breaking Me"	November 21, 2020	1	
218	David Guetta & Sia	"Let's Love"	November 28, 2020	1	
re	Topic and A7S	"Breaking Me"	December 5, 2020	1	
re	David Guetta & Sia	"Let's Love"	December 12, 2020	2	
219	Billie Eilish	"Therefore I Am"	December 26, 2020	2	
2021
220	Harry Styles	"Golden"	January 9, 2021	1	
re	Billie Eilish	"Therefore I Am"	January 16, 2021	1	
re	Topic and A7S	"Breaking Me"	January 23, 2021	1	
re	Billie Eilish	"Therefore I Am"	January 30, 2021	1	
221	The Weeknd	"Save Your Tears"	February 6, 2021	1	
222	Black Eyed Peas and Shakira	"Girl Like Me"	February 13, 2021	1	
re	The Weeknd	"Save Your Tears"	February 20, 2021	4	
223	Tiësto	"The Business"	March 20, 2021	1	
re	The Weeknd	"Save Your Tears"	March 27, 2021	2	
224	Olivia Rodrigo	"Drivers License"	April 10, 2021	1	
re	The Weeknd	"Save Your Tears"	April 17, 2021	1	
225	Silk Sonic (Bruno Mars & Anderson .Paak)	"Leave the Door Open"	April 24, 2021	1	
re	The Weeknd	"Save Your Tears"	May 1, 2021	2	
226	Majestic x Boney M.	"Rasputin"	May 15, 2021	4	
re	Silk Sonic (Bruno Mars & Anderson .Paak)	"Leave the Door Open"	June 12, 2021	1	
re	Majestic x Boney M.	"Rasputin"	June 19, 2021	1	
227	Lil Nas X	"Montero (Call Me by Your Name)"	June 26, 2021	1	
re	Silk Sonic (Bruno Mars & Anderson .Paak)	"Leave the Door Open"	July 3, 2021	1	
228	Olivia Rodrigo	"Good 4 U"	July 10, 2021	1	
229	Marshmello and Jonas Brothers	"Leave Before You Love Me"	July 17, 2021	3	
230	Ed Sheeran	"Bad Habits"	August 7, 2021	1	
re	Marshmello and Jonas Brothers	"Leave Before You Love Me"	August 14, 2021	1	
re	Ed Sheeran	"Bad Habits"	August 21, 2021	4	
231	The Weeknd	"Take My Breath"	September 18, 2021	1	
232	Tiësto and Karol G	"Don't Be Shy"	September 25, 2021	1	
233	Måneskin	"Beggin'"	October 2, 2021	1	
234	Elton John and Dua Lipa	"Cold Heart (Pnau remix)"	October 9, 2021	2	
235	Coldplay and BTS	"My Universe"	October 23, 2021	3	
re	Måneskin	"Beggin'"	November 13, 2021	2	
re	Elton John and Dua Lipa	"Cold Heart (Pnau remix)"	November 27, 2021	2	
236	SUPER-Hi and Neeka	"Following the Sun"	December 11, 2021	1	
re	Elton John and Dua Lipa	"Cold Heart (Pnau remix)"	December 18, 2021	5	
2022
237	bbno$ featuring Rich Brian	"Edamame"	January 22, 2022	2	
238	Imagine Dragons and JID	"Enemy"	February 5, 2022	1	
re	bbno$ featuring Rich Brian	"Edamame"	February 12, 2022	1	
re	Imagine Dragons and JID	"Enemy"	February 19, 2022	4	
re	bbno$ featuring Rich Brian	"Edamame"	March 19, 2022	1	
239	Imagine Dragons	"Bones"	March 26, 2022	1	
240	Jaymes Young	"Infinity"	April 2, 2022	1	
241	Gayle	"ABCDEFU"	April 9, 2022	1	
242	Glass Animals	"Heat Waves"	April 16, 2022	1	
re	Gayle	"ABCDEFU"	April 23, 2022	1	
243	Harry Styles	"As It Was"	April 30, 2022	2	
re	Glass Animals	"Heat Waves"	May 14, 2022	1	
244	Jack Harlow	"First Class"	May 21, 2022	2	
re	Harry Styles	"As It Was"	June 4, 2022	7	
245	Lizzo	"About Damn Time"	July 23, 2022	3	
246	Black Eyed Peas, Shakira and David Guetta	"Don't You Worry"	August 13, 2022	1	
247	Calvin Harris, Justin Timberlake, Halsey and Pharrell Williams	"Stay with Me"	August 20, 2022	3	

== Artists with most number-one singles ==
Artist	Number-one hits
Calvin Harris	7
Maroon 5	7
Katy Perry	7
Dua Lipa	5
Bruno Mars	5
Ed Sheeran	5
Sia	5
Pharrell Williams	5
Adele	4
Clean Bandit	4
Coldplay	4
The Weeknd	4
Justin Bieber	3
Twenty One Pilots	3
Miley Cyrus	3
Daft Punk	3
fun.	3
David Guetta	3
Kendrick Lamar	3
Zara Larsson	3
Macklemore	3
Charlie Puth	3
Rihanna	3
Selena Gomez (Note: Including Selena Gomez & the Scene.)	3
