= Ritual (electronic band) =

English electronic band

- Origin: London, United Kingdom
- Genres: Electronic; pop; R&B
- Years active: 2014–present
- Label: Island/Universal
- Members: Adam Midgley (aka Adam Gross); Tommy Baxter; Gerard O'Connell
- Website: www.ritual-music.com

Ritual are an English electronic musical group, songwriters and producers from London, United Kingdom. The three-piece band consists of Adam Midgley aka Adam Gross, Tommy Baxter, and Gerard O'Connell. While they became known for their work with others, most notably the gold UK single, "Hotter Than Hell" from Dua Lipa, since 2014 they have released four EPs, as well as an audio-visual project called, No Escape Out of Time. In 2019, Ritual released their Dreamers Never Learn album, and single, "Love Me Back" featuring Tove Styrke.

According to Billboard, Ritual uses "minimalist instrumentation, male-female vocal pairing and deeply personal but accessible lyrics," that "feels honest and fresh."

== Career ==
=== History ===
Ritual was formed by producers Tommy Baxter and Adam Gross in the London music scene where Baxter was a touring guitarist, while Gross created hip-hop beats for independent UK artists. They met Gerard O'Connnell, who was writing songs with the Xenomania production house for the likes of Kylie Minogue. As a trio, they wrote songs for other artists and released their own EPs beginning December 2014 with their debut, The Fall.

Ritual were signed to Island, who picked up their debut, and released their second EP, From the City to the Wilderness, in March 2015. "Josephine" was the lead single from the EP described as "a marvelously down tempo tune, all plaintive piano chords, guitars, shuffling beats and a dreamy exchange between the Ritual front man and Lisa Hannigan (a solo singer and frequent, early-years Damien Rice collaborator)." The second single released off From City to the Wilderness was "Low Season".

A hip hop remix version of the EP called From the Wilderness to the City was released shortly after in June 2015. "Low Season," with added vocals from Raye, was the first track released from the remix EP.

In 2015, the three participated in writing sessions for R&B artist Mononoke, (real name Katie Taylor) and she became the featured guest vocalist on the second single called "Bottle Tops" from Ritual's third EP entitled Every Night Another But Not You. From there, Ritual then went on to feature Mononoke's vocals on the full No Escape Out of Time project.

In September 2017, Ritual released a 10-song audio visual project entitled No Escape Out of Time, where every song had a video accompaniment directed by Jackson Ducasse. No Escape Out of Time ties together the previous music videos for "Drown the Lovers" and "Wouldn't Be Love" with a final installment for "Better By Now," making a full story line about love and loss.

For the remix of "Drown the Lovers," Ritual recruited 6lack to rap a verse on the track. Zane Lowe premiered the remix as a World Record on Beats 1 radio. For another song off the EP, Denzel Curry contributes a verse to "Real Feels."

The song, "The Only One" was featured on the soundtrack to the Jaden Smith-starring film, "Skate Kitchen". The album, on Darkroom/Interscope Records, came out September 2018 following the August release of the film.

In January 2019, Ritual released the first single from their new album, Dreamers Never Learn, which features the band and numerous female artists in a series of 21st Century love songs. The single, "Love Me Back", was co-written by Grammy-nominated Emily Warren and features the vocals of Swedish pop singer, Tove Styrke. Of "Love Me Back", Mother Jones magazine wrote: "In this single, all of its beats—the melody, the lyrics, the rhythm, and the delivery—hit all the points from start to finish."

=== Work with others ===
Ritual have written songs for other artists, including Dua Lipa, Bishop Briggs, Avicii, Little Mix, among others.

For the UK indie pop singer, Frances, they produced and contributed guest vocals on the track, "When It Comes to Us," for her debut EP, Grow, in July 2015. The song was the second single from the album.

The group wrote the gold-selling UK single "Hotter Than Hell" for Dua Lipa, which was included on her self-titled debut album, both released in 2016. In Rolling Stone, Lipa credits working with Ritual as the time when she found her songwriting style.

In October 2016, Ritual wrote and were featured on "You Remain," a song from French DJ and record producer Kungs on his Layers album released a month later.

Their 2019 album, Dreamers Never Learn features the vocals of Tove Styrke, and other female singers.

== Tours ==
=== Support ===
LANY (2017)

== Discography ==
=== Studio albums ===
Title	Details
No Escape Out of Time	Released: 29 September 2017; Label: Island, Decisive (Universal Music); Format: Digital download, CD

=== Extended plays ===
Title	Details
The Fall	Released: 2014; Label: Island/Universal; Format: Digital download, CD
From the City to the Wilderness	Released: 2015; Label: Island/Universal; Format: Digital download, CD
From the Wilderness to the City	Released: 2015; Label: Island/Universal; Format: Digital download, CD
Every Night Another but Not You	Released: 2016; Label: Island/Universal; Format: Digital download, CD

=== Singles ===
==== As lead artists ====
Title	Year	Album
"Cinnamon" (acoustic)	2016	Non-album singles
"Real Feels" (Ritual Remix) (featuring Kweku Collins)	2017	Non-album singles
"Josephine" (acoustic)	2018	Non-album singles

==== As featured artists ====
Title	Year	Peak chart positions			Artist(s)
Title	Year	FRA	US Airplay	US Sales	Artist(s)
"When It Comes to Us"	2015	—	—	—	Frances
"You Remain"	2016	45	—	46	Kungs
"Hallucinations"	2017	—	17	—	R3hab

=== Production/songwriting credits ===
Title	Year	Artist	Label	Notes
"I Need a Dollar" (Radio Mix)	2010	Aloe Blacc	Stones Throw Records/Sony	Additional production
"Heartstrings"	2010	Kylie Minogue	Parlophone	Songwriters
"Mighty Rivers"	2010	Kylie Minogue	Parlophone	Songwriters
"Mr. Postman"	2013	Diana Vickers	So Recordings	Songwriters
"La vita che morrel"	2013	Alessandra Amoroso	Sony	Songwriters
"Good Girl"	2015	Aquilo	Island	Production
"Touch Me"	2015	Avicii	Island/Universal	Songwriters
"Hotter Than Hell"	2016	Dua Lipa	Warner Bros.	Songwriters
"Lion's Den"	2016	Lawson	Polydor	Songwriters
"Grow Up"	2016	Olly Murs	Epic	Production
"How Much for Your Love"	2016	Olly Murs	Epic	Production
"Nobody Like You"	2016	Little Mix	Syco/Sony	Additional production
"No More Alone"	2017	Norma Jean Martine	BMG/Virgin EMI	Songwriters
"Hope"	2017	Take That	Polydor	Songwriters
"Someone's Somebody"	2017	Jasmine Thompson	Atlantic	Songwriters
"Cover Girls" feat. Bibi Bourelly	2017	Hitimpulse	Ultra	Songwriters
"Ashes"	2017	Grace Carter	Polydor	Co-production
"Parking Lots"	2018	Balcony	Entourage	Songwriters
"For You"	2018	Iman Osman	Independent	Songwriters/Production
"Nothing Really Matters"	2019	Gabrielle Aplin	AWAL	Songwriters/Production
"24"	2019	Skaar	Warner Bros.	Songwriters
"All for You" feat. Karen Harding	2019	Wilkinson	RAM/Virgin EMI	Songwriters
"Without You" with Nina Nesbitt	2019	John Newman	Island	Songwriters/Production
"Like It Is" with Zara Larsson and Tyga	2020	Kygo	Sony	Songwriters
"Wake Up"	2020	Now United	AWAL	Songwriters
"Paradise" feat. Dermot Kennedy	2020	Meduza	Polydor/Virgin EMI	Songwriters
"Hurt"	2021	Aksel		Songwriters
"Heat" with Amber Mark	2021	Paul Woolford	Ministry of Sound	Songwriters
"Cuts & Bruises"	2021	Josie Man	Promised Land	Songwriters/Production
"Again Again"	2022	Sea Girls	Polydor	Songwriters
"Watch Your Step"	2022	Sea Girls	Polydor	Songwriters
