= Coely =

Belgian singer and rapper

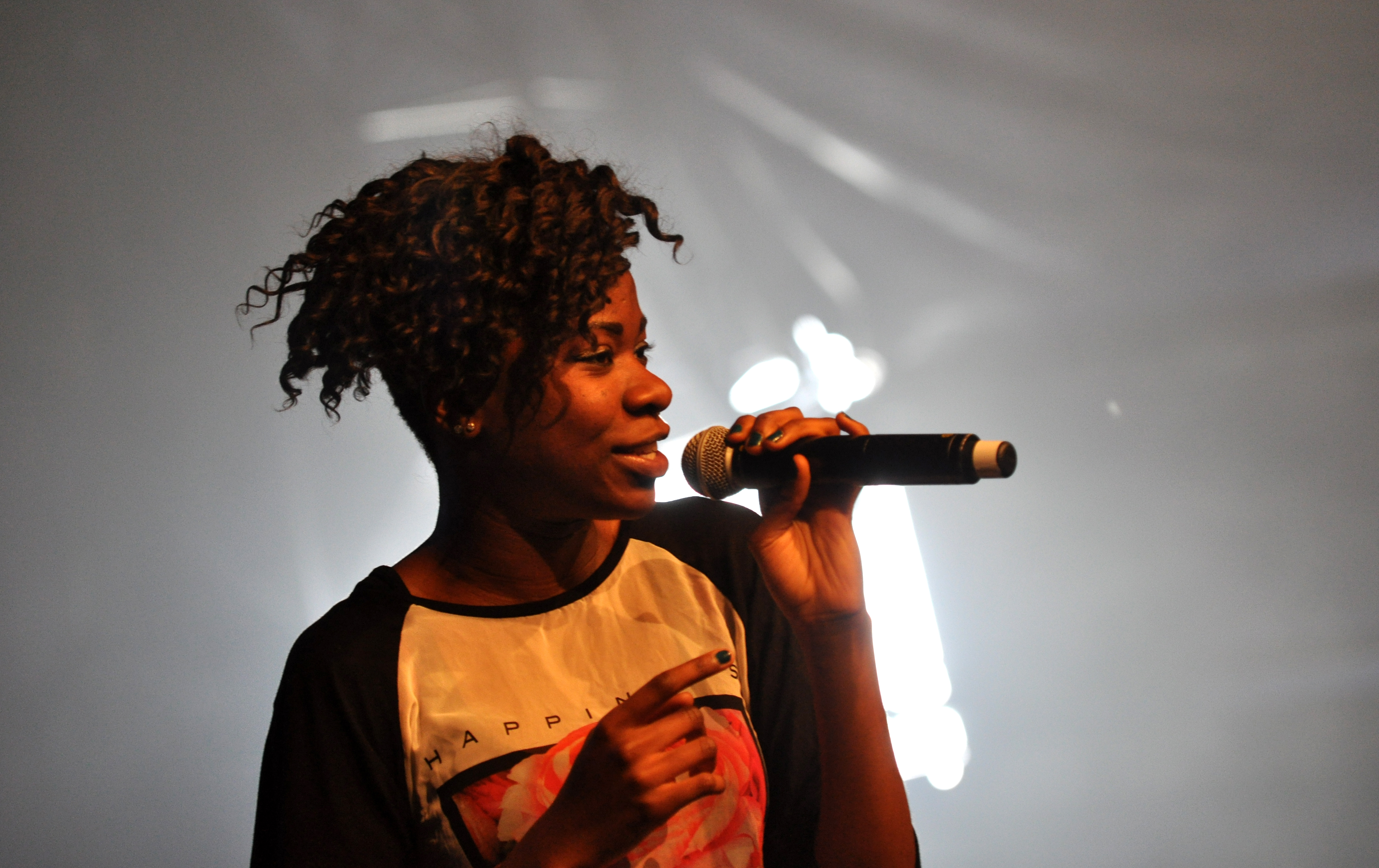
Coely Mbueno

Coely Mbueno (born in 1994), performing as Coely, is a Belgian urban artist.

== Biography ==
Coely Mbueno was born in Antwerp in 1994 to Congolese parents. She started singing in a church choir directed by her mother at a young age. She started rapping when she was 14 years old, at first covering Nicki Minaj in a local youth club.

She has played as an opening act for Kanye West, De La Soul and Kendrick Lamar, and has performed at all major Belgian festivals, and international festivals like Glastonbury.

== Discography ==
- 2013: RAAH The Soulful Yeah’t (EP)
- 2016: Different Waters (full length album): reached #8 on the Flemish Ultratop album charts, #61 on the Walloon Ultratop, and #138 in the Netherlands

=== Singles ===
- 2012: Ain't Chasing Pavements
- 2013: Nothing On Me, All I Do
- 2014: My Tomorrow
- 2016: Don't Care, reached #1 in De Afrekening, hitlist of Studio Brussel
- 2017: Wake Up Call, Celebrate, No Way
- 2018: Hush

=== As a featured artist ===
- More Mess by Kungs, a top 20 hit in France
- Magic Carpet by Dvtch Norris

== Awards ==
- 2017: Music Industry Awards: won Solo Woman Award, and Urban Award
- 2017: Female Belgian singer of the year at HUMO's Pop Poll
- 2018: Ultima award for Music from the Flemish Ministry of Culture
- 2018: Music Industry Awards: nominated for Solo Woman and for Urban
