= Layers (Kungs album) =

Studio album by Kungs
- Released: 4 November 2016
- Recorded: 2015
- Studio: Shoreditch Grind Studio, The White Room Studio, Fryarcorp HQ, London, England; Studio St Germain, Studio du Futur de l'Audiovisuel, Polydor Studio, Paris, France; Val Production, Aix-en-Provence
- Genre: Deep house; tropical house
- Length: 40:56
- Label: House of Barclay
- Producer: Kungs

Kungs chronology
Layers (2016)	Club Azur (2022)

Singles from Layers
- 1. "This Girl" Released: 19 February 2016; 2. "Don't You Know" Released: 24 June 2016; 3. "I Feel So Bad" Released: 19 October 2016; 4. "You Remain" Released: 27 October 2016

Layers is the debut studio album written and conducted by French DJ and record producer Kungs. It was released in France on 4 November 2016 by House of Barclay. The album peaked at number 8 on the French Albums Chart. The album includes the singles "This Girl", "Don't You Know", "I Feel So Bad" and "You Remain".

== Singles ==
- "This Girl" was released as the lead single from the album on 19 February 2016. It is a remix of Cookin' on 3 Burners' original song with vocals by Kylie Auldist. The song peaked at number one on the French Singles Chart.
- "Don't You Know" was released as the second single from the album on 24 June 2016. The song peaked at number 5 on the French Singles Chart.
- "I Feel So Bad" was released as the third single from the album on 19 October 2016. The song peaked at number 3 on the French Singles Chart.
- "You Remain" was released as the fourth single from the album on 27 October 2016. The song peaked at number 45 on the French Singles Chart.

== Track listing ==
Standard listing
No.	Title	Writer(s)	Producer(s)	Length
1.	"Melody" (featuring Luke Pritchard)	Kungs; Luke Pritchard	Kungs	4:02
2.	"This Girl" (vs. Cookin' on 3 Burners)	Lance Ferguson; Ivan Khatchoyan; Jake Mason	Kungs	3:15
3.	"Don't You Know" (featuring Jamie N Commons)	Kungs; Jamie N Commons; Melanie Pereira	Kungs	3:04
4.	"You Remain" (featuring Ritual)	Kungs; Adam Midgley; Tommy Baxter; Gez O'Connel	Kungs	3:43
5.	"Freedom" (featuring Wolfgang)	Kungs; Melanie Pereira; Wolfgang Patrick Valbrun	Kungs	2:54
6.	"When You're Gone" (featuring Tillie)	Kungs; Joe Spargur; Grace Allison Kelly; Eric Tobias Wincorn	Kungs	3:35
7.	"Wild Church"	Kungs; Victor Soulisse	Kungs	3:54
8.	"Bangalore Streets" (featuring Freia)	Kungs; Badea Victoria Ionna; Galajia Alexandru Daniel	Kungs	3:10
9.	"Tripping Off" (featuring Lune)	Kungs; Tom Havelock; Linnea Martinsson	Kungs	2:56
10.	"I Feel So Bad" (featuring Ephemerals)	Kungs; Nicholas Hillman	Kungs	3:26
11.	"Crazy Enough" (featuring Richard Judge)	Kungs; Richard Judge	Kungs	3:52
12.	"Trust" (featuring Rae Morris)	Kungs; Benjamin Garrett; Rae Morris	Kungs	3:25

=== Samples ===
- "When You're Gone" contains a sample from "Lost Boy", written by Grace Allison Kelly, Joe Spargur & Eric Tobias Wincorn.
- "I Feel So Bad" contains a sample from "You Made Us Change", written by Nicholas Hillman.

== Personnel ==
Adapted credits from the media notes of Layers.

- Kungs: programming, engineering, mixing
- Rainer Rütsch: additional mix and mastering
- Julien Courtois: additional mix and mastering (track 2)
- Nathaniel N.M. Robert: creative direction
- Romain Staros: photography

== Charts ==
=== Weekly charts ===
Chart (2016)	Peak position
Austrian Albums (Ö3 Austria)	74
Belgian Albums (Ultratop Flanders)	76
Canadian Albums (Billboard)	33
Belgian Albums (Ultratop Wallonia)	32
French Albums (SNEP)	8
German Albums (Offizielle Top 100)	56
Swiss Albums (Schweizer Hitparade)	18
US Billboard 200	196

=== Year-end charts ===
Chart (2016)	Position
French Albums (SNEP)	83

Chart (2017)	Position
French Albums (SNEP)	52

== Certifications ==
Region	Certification	Certified units/sales
France (SNEP)	2× Platinum	200,000^{‡}
Mexico (AMPROFON)	Gold	30,000^{‡}
Poland (ZPAV)	Platinum	20,000^{‡}
^{‡} Sales+streaming figures based on certification alone.

== Release history ==
Region	Release date	Format	Label
France	4 November 2016	Digital download; CD	House of Barclay
