= Don't You Know (Kungs song) =

Single by Kungs featuring Jamie N Commons

from the album Layers
- Released: 24 June 2016
- Genre: Deep house
- Length: 3:04
- Label: House of Barclay
- Songwriter: Valentin Brunel
- Producer: Kungs

Kungs singles chronology
| "This Girl" (2016) | "Don't You Know" (2016) | "I Feel So Bad" (2016) |

Music video
- "Don't You Know" on YouTube

"Don't You Know" is a song by French DJ and record producer Kungs with vocals by British singer Jamie N Commons. It was released on 24 June 2016 as a digital download by House of Barclay.

== Music video ==
The accompanying music video for the song was released on Kungs' Vevo channel on YouTube on 24 June 2016. It was directed by Giany for La Main Productions. The actors in the music video were Kungs himself and Lola Viande.

== Track listing ==
Streaming single
| No. | Title | Length |
|---|---|---|
| 1. | "Don't You Know" (featuring Jamie N Commons) | 3:04 |

== Charts and certifications ==
=== Weekly charts ===
| Chart (2016) | Peak position |
|---|---|
| Austria (Ö3 Austria Top 40) | 8 |
| Czech Republic Airplay (ČNS IFPI) | 62 |
| Belgium (Ultratop 50 Flanders) | 33 |
| Belgium (Ultratop 50 Wallonia) | 15 |
| France (SNEP) | 5 |
| Germany (GfK) | 16 |
| Hungary (Rádiós Top 40) | 4 |
| Hungary (Single Top 40) | 21 |
| Mexico (Billboard Ingles Airplay) | 1 |
| Portugal (AFP) | 45 |
| Scottish Singles Sales (Official Charts) | 37 |
| Serbia (Radiomonitor) | 3 |
| Slovakia Airplay (ČNS IFPI) | 51 |
| Slovakia Singles Digital (ČNS IFPI) | 99 |
| Slovenia (SloTop50) | 24 |
| Spain (Promusicae) | 44 |
| Switzerland (Schweizer Hitparade) | 17 |
| UK Singles (Official Charts) | 172 |

=== Year-end charts ===
| Chart (2016) | Position |
|---|---|
| France (SNEP) | 79 |
| Switzerland (Schweizer Hitparade) | 74 |

=== Certifications ===
| Region | Certification | Certified units/sales |
|---|---|---|
| Brazil (Pro-Música Brasil) | Gold | 30,000^{‡} |
| France (SNEP) | Diamond | 333,333^{‡} |
| Germany (BVMI) | Gold | 200,000^{‡} |
^{‡} Sales+streaming figures based on certification alone.

== Release history ==
| Region | Date | Format | Label |
|---|---|---|---|
| France | 24 June 2016 | Digital download | House of Barclay |
