= More Mess =

Single by Kungs featuring Olly Murs and Coely
- Released: 4 August 2017
- Recorded: 2016
- Genre: Pop
- Length: 3:26
- Label: Barclay
- Songwriters: John Newman; Niels Van Malderen; Filip Korte; Coely Mbueno; Yann Gaudeuille; Kungs; Maxime L; Bo Baral; Jan "JJ" Whitefield
- Producer: Kungs

Kungs singles chronology
"You Remain" (2016)	"More Mess" (2017)	"Be Right Here" (2018)

Olly Murs singles chronology
"Unpredictable" (2017)	"More Mess" (2017)	"Moves" (2018)

Coely singles chronology
"My Tomorrow" (2017)	"More Mess" (2017)	"Hush" (2018)

"More Mess" is a song performed by French DJ and record producer Kungs, featuring vocals from English singer Olly Murs and Belgian singer Coely. The song was released as a digital download in France on 4 August 2017. The song was written by John Newman, Niels Van Malderen, Filip Korte, Coely Mbueno, Yann Gaudeuille, Kungs, Maxime L, Bo Baral and Jan "JJ" Whitefield who was also in the band Poets of Rhythm, that originally released a similar title in 1994 called ‘More Mess on my Thing’. The song has peaked at number 20 on the French Singles Chart.

== Music video ==
The video was released on 20 September 2017 and was filmed in Barcelona.

It features Kungs meeting up with Murs, before being pursued by a group of people. They then run into Coely, who becomes caught in the chase.

Eventually, the trio give up running and instead dance with the group. The video ends with the trio going their separate ways.

== Charts ==
Chart (2017)	Peak position
Belgium (Ultratip Bubbling Under Flanders)	1
Belgium (Ultratip Bubbling Under Wallonia)	17
France (SNEP)	20
Poland (Polish Airplay Top 100)	34

== Release history ==
Region	Date	Format	Label
France	4 August 2017	Digital download	House of Barclay
