= Lady Lash =

Australian jazz and artist

Lady Lash, born Crystal Mastrosavas, is an Australian hip-hop and jazz artist of indigenous Kokatha and Greek descent. She grew up in Ceduna, South Australia and now resides in Melbourne, Victoria. Her work typically combines poetry, observation, and a spiritual element. Some of her songs reflect themes of inter-generational trauma such the Stolen Generations and living with racism.

== Career ==
As a teenager, she performed as a backing singer for the indigenous rock band Coloured Stone, fronted by Bunna Lawrie. She toured with the band and appeared on the album Rhythm of Nature. The first album she bought was 2pac's All Eyes on Me.

Crystal reverted to the name Lady Lash in 2015, releasing the album Milky Way produced by her husband working under the name Skitzo Productions. The release led to her nomination for "Best Indigenous Act" at the Music Victoria Awards in 2016. Her next release was a trip hop EP entitled Cats Eyes Sirens Mouth. Her next release, Therapy Tapes came in 2017.

She performed at the Sydney Opera House as a cast member in Deborah Cheetham's indigenous opera, Pecan Summer.

== Awards and nominations ==
=== Music Victoria Awards ===
The Music Victoria Awards are an annual awards night celebrating Victorian music. They commenced in 2006.

Year	Nominee / work	Award	Result	Ref.
Music Victoria Awards of 2016	Lady Lash	Best Indigenous Act	Nominated	
