= Be Right Here (song) =

Single by Kungs and Stargate featuring Goldn
- Released: 22 June 2018
- Recorded: Early 2018
- Length: 3:11
- Label: Barclay
- Songwriters: Valentin Brunel; Camila Cabello; Charlotte Aitchison; Jonnali Parmenius; Alexandra Yatchenko; Mikkel Eriksen; Tor Erik Hermansen; Robbie Bergin
- Producers: Kungs; Stargate; Greg Cerrone; Kevin Calame; Tim Blacksmith; Danny D; Tyran "Ty Ty" Smith; Jay Brown

Kungs singles chronology
| "More Mess" (2017) | "Be Right Here" (2018) | "Disco Night" (2018) |

Stargate singles chronology
| "Carry You Home" (2017) | "Be Right Here" (2018) |

Music video
- "Be Right Here" on YouTube

"Be Right Here" is a song by French DJ Kungs and Norwegian production duo Stargate featuring American singer Goldn. The song was released by record label Barclay, on 22 June 2018, through digital download and streaming formats. The song was written by Kungs, Camila Cabello, Charli XCX, Noonie Bao, Sasha Sloan, Stargate and Robert Bergin (also known as Throttle). "Be Right Here" was produced by Kungs, Stargate, Greg Cerrone, Kevin Calame, Tim Blacksmith, Danny D, Tyran "Ty Ty" Smith and Jay Brown.

The song received minor success on the French charts, peaking at 77.

== Charts ==
Chart performance for "Be Right Here"
| Chart (2018) | Peak position |
|---|---|
| France (SNEP) | 77 |
