= Kylie Auldist =

Australian singer

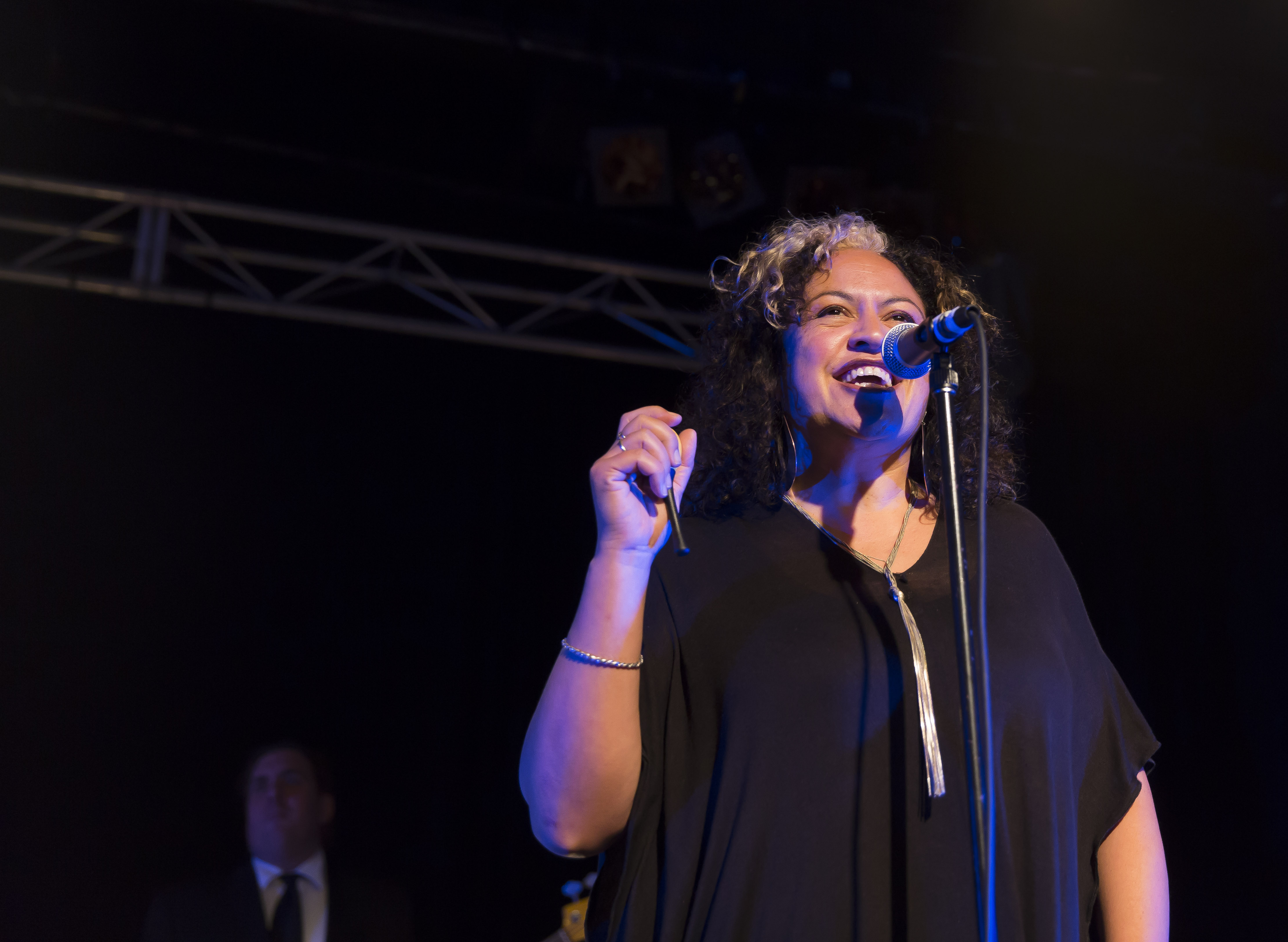
- Auldist performed in June 2015

Background information
- Born: 20 September 1968 (age 58)
- Origin: Broken Hill, Australia
- Genres: Deep funk, soul
- Occupations: Musician
- Instruments: Vocals
- Years active: 2000–present
- Label: Tru Thoughts
- Website: kylieauldist.com

Kylie Auldist (born 18 September 1968) is an Australian singer, best known as the singer of the Bamboos and Cookin' on 3 Burners. She has also released six solo albums.

== Career ==
Auldist recorded her first song at the age of six. She is half Samoan. She moved from Broken Hill to Melbourne to pursue a career as a singer. She performed as a backing singer both live and on studio recordings with Renee Geyer and Jimmy Barnes. She also worked with the groups Curtis Late, Secret Masters, Small Fish Deep Sea, and Megabias, as well as Polyester, whose guitarist, Lance Ferguson, also played with funk group the Bamboos. She officially joined The Bamboos in 2006, debuting on stage at Meredith Music Festival in a late night set.

In 2008 she travelled with the band to the UK, where she was immediately signed to Brighton record label Tru Thoughts. Auldist recorded vocals for the 2009 Cookin' on 3 Burners song "This Girl", which went to number one on the iTunes R&B chart in the UK.

In 2012, Auldist released her third full-length for Tru Thoughts, entitled Still Life.

At the Music Victoria Awards of 2013, Auldist won Best Soul, Funk, R'n'B and Gospel Album for Still Life.

In 2014 she performed on Katie Noonan's album Songs That Made Me, which debuted at number 7 on the ARIA compilation chart.

Auldist performed three sets at Woodford Folk Festival in December 2014.

In 2016, Auldist's vocals on "This Girl" with Cookin' on 3 Burners, remixed by Kungs, charted in the United States, France, Germany, the United Kingdom, Belgium, the Netherlands and Australia.

In February 2026, Auldist released her sixth studio album, Hybrid

== Personal life ==
Auldist is married and has a son, who is also a musician. They live in Glenroy, Victoria.

== Discography ==
=== Studio albums ===
List of studio albums, with selected details
Title	Album details
Just Say	Released: 2008; Label: Tru Thoughts (TRUCD159); Formats: CD, LP, digital download
Made of Stone	Released: 10 August 2009; Label: Tru Thoughts (TRUCD197); Formats: CD, LP, digital download
Still Life	Released: 15 October 2012; Label: Tru Thoughts (TRUCD257); Formats: CD, digital download
Family Tree	Released: 5 August 2016; Label: Family Tree Records (FTR001); Formats: Digital download
This Is What Happiness Looks Like	Released: 9 October 2020; Label: Soul Bank Music; Formats: CD, digital download, LP
Hybrid	Released: 13 February 2026; Label: Kyle Auldist; Formats: digital download

=== Extended plays ===
List of EPs, with selected details
Title	EP details
Taste (Taste featuring Kylie Auldist)	Released: 17 July 2013; Label: Gusto Music; Formats: digital download

== Awards and nominations ==
=== AIR Awards ===
The Australian Independent Record Awards (commonly known informally as AIR Awards) is an annual awards night to recognise, promote and celebrate the success of Australia's Independent Music sector.

Year	Nominee / work	Award	Result	Ref.
2021	This Is What Happiness Looks Like	Best Independent Soul/R&B Album or EP	Nominated	

=== APRA Awards ===
The APRA Awards are held in Australia and New Zealand by the Australasian Performing Right Association to recognise songwriting skills, sales and airplay performance by its members annually.

Year	Nominee / work	Award	Result	Ref.
2018	"Mind Made Up" by Cookin' on 3 Burners (featuring Kylie Auldist)	Dance Work of the Year	Nominated	

=== Music Victoria Awards ===
The Music Victoria Awards (previously known as The Age EG Awards and The Age Music Victoria Awards) are an annual awards night celebrating Victorian music.

Year	Nominee / work	Award	Result
2013	herself	Best Female Artist	Nominated
2013	Still Life	Best Soul, Funk, R'n'B and Gospel Album	Won
2016	herself	Best Female Artist	Nominated
2016	Family Tree	Best Soul, Funk, R'n'B or Gospel Album	Won
2021	herself	Best Solo Act	Nominated
