= I Feel So Bad (Kungs song) =

Single by Kungs featuring Ephemerals

from the album Layers
- Released: 19 October 2016
- Length: 3:26
- Label: House of Barclay
- Songwriters: Kungs; Nicholas Hillman
- Producer: Kungs

Kungs singles chronology
"Don't You Know" (2016)	"I Feel So Bad" (2016)	"You Remain" (2016)

"I Feel So Bad" is a song performed by French DJ and record producer Kungs, featuring vocals from Ephemerals. The song was released as a digital download in France on 19 October 2016 as the third single from his debut studio album Layers (2016). The song has peaked at number 3 on the French Singles Chart. The song was written by Kungs and Nicholas Hillman.

== Music video ==
A music video to accompany the release of "I Feel So Bad" was first released onto YouTube on 3 November 2016 at a total length of three minutes and twenty-five seconds.

== Track listing ==
Digital download
No.	Title	Length
1.	"I Feel So Bad" (featuring Ephemerals)	3:26

== Charts ==
=== Weekly charts ===
Chart (2016–2017)	Peak position
Belgium (Ultratop 50 Flanders)	43
Belgium (Ultratop 50 Wallonia)	18
Czech Republic Airplay (ČNS IFPI)	15
France (SNEP)	3
Germany (GfK)	88
Hungary (Rádiós Top 40)	28
Mexico Airplay (Billboard)	6
Poland Airplay (ZPAV)	16
Russia Airplay (Tophit)	72
Switzerland (Schweizer Hitparade)	52

2026 weekly chart performance
Chart (2026)	Peak position
Kazakhstan Airplay (TopHit)	82

=== Year-end charts ===
Chart (2017)	Position
France (SNEP)	84
Latvia Airplay (LaIPA)	69

== Certifications ==
Region	Certification	Certified units/sales
Brazil (Pro-Música Brasil)	Gold	30,000^{‡}
France (SNEP)	Diamond	233,333^{‡}
^{‡} Sales+streaming figures based on certification alone.

== Release history ==
Region	Date	Format	Label
France	19 October 2016	Digital download	House of Barclay
