= This Girl (Cookin' on 3 Burners song) =

2009 song remixed in 2016 by Kungs

Single by Cookin' on 3 Burners featuring Kylie Auldist

from the album Soul Messin
- B-side: "Four n'Twenty"
- Released: 22 June 2009
- Recorded: 2008
- Genre: Funk; soul
- Length: 3:45
- Label: Freestyle; Soul Messin'; Warner
- Songwriters: Jake Mason; Lance Ferguson; Ivan Khatchoyan

Live video
- "This Girl" on YouTube

"This Girl" is a song by Australian funk trio Cookin' on 3 Burners, featuring vocals by Kylie Auldist, released on 22 June 2009 as the second single from the group's second album, Soul Messin. A remix by French DJ and record producer Kungs was released as a digital download on 19 February 2016 by House of Barclay as the lead single from his debut studio album, Layers (2016), which found major success across Europe.

== Kungs remix ==
"This Girl"

Single by Kungs vs. Cookin' on 3 Burners

from the album Layers
- Released: 19 February 2016
- Recorded: 2015
- Genre: House
- Length: 4:04
- Label: House of Barclay; Casablanca; Republic
- Songwriters: Jake Mason; Lance Ferguson; Ivan Khatchoyan
- Producer: Kungs

Kungs singles chronology
| "We'll Meet Again" (2015) | "This Girl" (2016) | "Don't You Know" (2017) |

Cookin' on 3 Burners singles chronology
| "Losin' Streak" (2014) | "This Girl" (2016) | "Mind Made Up" (2016) |

Music video
- "This Girl" on YouTube

The Kungs remix of "This Girl" reached number one in a number of countries including France and Germany and the top 10 in 18 countries including Austria, Canada, Denmark, Ireland, Italy, Netherlands, Spain, Sweden, Switzerland, and the United Kingdom.

The song was performed on stage by Kungs with the vocalist Mel Sugar on the French television show Le Petit Journal on 24 March 2016. An EP featuring an extended mix of the track, two remixes and a solo track by Kungs titled "Milos" was released on iTunes on 26 March 2016. Billboard ranked "This Girl" at number 48 on their "100 Best Pop Songs of 2016" list.

=== Music video ===
The accompanying music video for the remix was filmed on the Greek island of Milos. It was released on Kungs' Vevo channel on YouTube on 24 March 2016. It was directed by Matt Larson for La Main Productions. The models in the video are Louis Rault and Irina Martynenko. The video starts with the boy and girl meeting on a cruise ship. They later become a couple and starting dancing in their bedroom. The ship reaches the shore, and the boy and girl explore the land, coming across lakes and hills. They later discover a cave and begin dancing in the cave over a bonfire. As of 8 September 2025, the video had reached over 550 million views on YouTube.

=== Track listing ===
All tracks except "Milos" credited to Kungs and Cookin' on 3 Burners.

Streaming single
| No. | Title | Length |
|---|---|---|
| 1. | "This Girl" | 3:18 |

This Girl EP
| No. | Title | Length |
|---|---|---|
| 1. | "This Girl" (Extended Mix) | 4:02 |
| 2. | "This Girl" (Fabich Remix) | 4:19 |
| 3. | "This Girl" (Betical Remix) | 4:17 |
| 4. | "Milos" | 3:36 |

== Charts ==
=== Weekly charts ===
2016–2017 weekly chart performance for "This Girl"
| Chart (2016–2017) | Peak position |
|---|---|
| Argentina (Monitor Latino) | 2 |
| Australia (ARIA) | 17 |
| Austria (Ö3 Austria Top 40) | 2 |
| Belarus Airplay (Eurofest) | 62 |
| Belgium (Ultratop 50 Flanders) | 3 |
| Belgium (Ultratop 50 Wallonia) | 1 |
| Brazil Hot 100 Airplay (Billboard Brasil) | 29 |
| Canada Hot 100 (Billboard) | 8 |
| Canada AC (Billboard) | 18 |
| Canada CHR/Top 40 (Billboard) | 5 |
| Canada Hot AC (Billboard) | 10 |
| Czech Republic Airplay (ČNS IFPI) | 3 |
| Czech Republic Singles Digital (ČNS IFPI) | 4 |
| Denmark (Tracklisten) | 9 |
| Finland Download (Latauslista) | 16 |
| France (SNEP) | 1 |
| Germany (GfK) | 1 |
| Hungary (Dance Top 40) | 2 |
| Hungary (Rádiós Top 40) | 1 |
| Hungary (Single Top 40) | 2 |
| Ireland (IRMA) | 3 |
| Israel International Airplay (Media Forest) | 2 |
| Italy (FIMI) | 6 |
| Latvia (Latvijas Top 40) | 1 |
| Lebanon (Lebanese Top 20) | 13 |
| Mexico (Monitor Latino) | 2 |
| Netherlands (Dutch Top 40) | 3 |
| Netherlands (Single Top 100) | 3 |
| New Zealand (Recorded Music NZ) | 22 |
| Norway (VG-lista) | 20 |
| Paraguay (Monitor Latino) | 12 |
| Poland Airplay (ZPAV) | 4 |
| Portugal (AFP) | 12 |
| Romania Airplay (Media Forest) | 5 |
| Russia Airplay (Tophit) | 1 |
| Scottish Singles Sales (Official Charts) | 1 |
| Serbia (Radiomonitor) | 1 |
| Slovakia Airplay (ČNS IFPI) | 3 |
| Slovakia Singles Digital (ČNS IFPI) | 1 |
| Slovenia (SloTop50) | 4 |
| Spain (Promusicae) | 8 |
| Sweden (Sverigetopplistan) | 8 |
| Switzerland (Schweizer Hitparade) | 6 |
| UK Singles (Official Charts) | 2 |
| UK Dance (Official Charts) | 1 |
| US Billboard Hot 100 | 26 |
| US Hot Dance/Electronic Songs (Billboard) | 7 |
| US Adult Pop Airplay (Billboard) | 22 |
| US Alternative Songs (Billboard) | 32 |
| US Dance Club Songs (Billboard) | 10 |
| US Pop Airplay (Billboard) | 15 |
| US Rhythmic Airplay (Billboard) | 21 |

2024 weekly chart performance for "This Girl"
| Chart (2024) | Peak position |
|---|---|
| Romania Airplay (TopHit) | 94 |

2025 weekly chart performance for "This Girl"
| Chart (2025) | Peak position |
|---|---|
| Romania Airplay (TopHit) | 91 |

2026 weekly chart performance for "This Girl"
| Chart (2026) | Peak position |
|---|---|
| Venezuela Airplay (Record Report) | 79 |

=== Year-end charts ===
| Chart (2016) | Position |
|---|---|
| Argentina (Monitor Latino) | 2 |
| Australia (ARIA) | 61 |
| Austria (Ö3 Austria Top 40) | 9 |
| Belgium (Ultratop Flanders) | 6 |
| Belgium (Ultratop Wallonia) | 2 |
| Canada (Canadian Hot 100) | 37 |
| Denmark (Tracklisten) | 49 |
| France (SNEP) | 3 |
| Germany (Official German Charts) | 6 |
| Hungary (Dance Top 40) | 13 |
| Hungary (Rádiós Top 40) | 13 |
| Hungary (Single Top 40) | 8 |
| Iceland (Plötutíóindi) | 22 |
| Israel (Media Forest) | 15 |
| Italy (FIMI) | 23 |
| Netherlands (Dutch Top 40) | 11 |
| Netherlands (Single Top 100) | 21 |
| Poland (ZPAV) | 9 |
| Russia Airplay (Tophit) | 4 |
| Slovenia (SloTop50) | 29 |
| Spain (PROMUSICAE) | 65 |
| Sweden (Sverigetopplistan) | 46 |
| Switzerland (Schweizer Hitparade) | 17 |
| UK Singles (Official Charts Company) | 22 |
| US Hot Dance/Electronic Songs (Billboard) | 11 |
| Chart (2017) | Position |
| Argentina (Monitor Latino) | 29 |
| Brazil (Billboard Brasil Hot 100 Airplay) | 91 |
| France (SNEP) | 98 |
| Hungary (Dance Top 40) | 29 |
| Hungary (Rádiós Top 40) | 48 |
| Israel (Media Forest) | 41 |
| Poland (ZPAV) | 62 |
| US Hot Dance/Electronic Songs (Billboard) | 81 |
| Chart (2018) | Position |
| Hungary (Rádiós Top 40) | 59 |
| Chart (2024) | Position |
| Lithuania Airplay (TopHit) | 92 |
| Chart (2025) | Position |
| Lithuania Airplay (TopHit) | 99 |

== Certifications ==
| Region | Certification | Certified units/sales |
|---|---|---|
| Australia (ARIA) | Platinum | 70,000^{‡} |
| Austria (IFPI Austria) | Gold | 15,000^{‡} |
| Belgium (BRMA) | 2× Platinum | 40,000^{‡} |
| Brazil (Pro-Música Brasil) | 2× Diamond | 500,000^{‡} |
| Denmark (IFPI Danmark) | 2× Platinum | 180,000^{‡} |
| France (SNEP) | Diamond | 233,333^{‡} |
| Germany (BVMI) | Diamond | 1,000,000^{‡} |
| Italy (FIMI) | 4× Platinum | 200,000^{‡} |
| New Zealand (RMNZ) | 4× Platinum | 120,000^{‡} |
| Poland (ZPAV) | Diamond | 250,000^{‡} |
| Portugal (AFP) | 2× Platinum | 20,000^{‡} |
| Spain (Promusicae) | 2× Platinum | 120,000^{‡} |
| Sweden (GLF) | 3× Platinum | 120,000^{‡} |
| United Kingdom (BPI) | 4× Platinum | 2,400,000^{‡} |
| United States (RIAA) | Platinum | 1,000,000^{‡} |
^{‡} Sales+streaming figures based on certification alone.

== Release history ==
| Region | Date | Format | Label |
|---|---|---|---|
| France | 19 February 2016 | Digital download | House of Barclay |
| Canada | 26 July 2016 | Contemporary hit radio | House of Barclay |

== Legacy ==
In 2010, the original version of the song was featured in the fourteenth episode of the tenth season of Degrassi.

The Kungs version has been featured in Apple ads in and the Shot on iPhone challenge which a meme is based on.

In 2016, British online department store Littlewoods included the song in a TV advertising campaign. The song was featured in a 2017 commercial for Cricket Wireless in association with Samsung, and later used as the theme music for the U.S. version of Big Star's Little Star. The song has also been adopted by football fans and chants have been inspired by the song's rhythm, such as Liverpool's Georginio Wijnaldum, Arsenal's Alexandre Lacazette, former Manchester City F.C.'s Fernandinho, Plymouth Argyle's Morgan Whittaker, Reading's Andy Yiadom, Inverness Caledonian Thistle's Coll Donaldson, Oxford United's Cameron Brannagan and King's Lynn Town's Adam Marriott. FC Porto goals in Estádio do Dragão are celebrated with the song's chorus in the background. It is also the goal celebration song for Leicester City.

In 2021, this song was chosen by fans of the Philadelphia Flyers as their new goal song, but was dropped a year later. It was also goal song for the Avangard Omsk from KHL from 2018 to 2022.

The Republic of Ireland used it as their goal song during the 2023 FIFA Women's World Cup.
