= Music Victoria Awards of 2016 =

Annual Australian music awards ceremony

- Date: 16 November 2016
- Venue: 170 Russell, Melbourne, Victoria

Highlights
- Most wins: King Gizzard & the Lizard Wizard (3)
- Most nominations: The Drones (5)

The Music Victoria Awards of 2016 are the 11th Annual Music Victoria Awards and consist of a series of awards, presented on 16 November 2016, during Melbourne Music Week. For the first time this year, the Best Venue award was separated into of over and under 500 capacity.

== Hall of Fame inductees ==
- Triple R

Chair of Board of Directors, former long-term broadcaster, and Triple R first music coordinator Geoff King said, "I'm really proud of the contribution Triple R has made to our musical and intellectual life so it's great to have such a public celebration in its 40th year. The Music Victoria Hall of Fame induction is a powerful way of recognising Triple R's achievements when placed alongside earlier inductees, particularly the likes of Stan Rofe and Bill Armstrong, without whom Melbourne would not have developed such a strong music scene."

== Award nominees and winners ==
=== All genre Awards ===
Winners indicated in boldface, with other nominees in plain.

Best Album	Best Song
**King Gizzard & the Lizard Wizard - Nonagon Infinity**; Camp Cope – Camp Cope; The Drones - Feelin Kinda Free; NO ZU – Afterlife; Olympia – Self Talk	**The Drones – "Taman Shud"**; Cable Ties – "Same for Me"; Camp Cope – "Jet Fuel Can't Melt Steel Beams"; Alex Lahey – "You Don't Think You Like People Like Me"; Teeth & Tongue – "Dianne"
Best Male	Best Female
**CW Stoneking**; Briggs; Al Montfort; Remi; Henry Wagons	**Alex Lahey**; Kylie Auldist; Jess Cornelius; Olympia; Ella Thompson
Best Band	Best Emerging Artist
**King Gizzard and the Lizard Wizard**; Camp Cope; Dorsal Fins; The Drones; Gold Class	**Camp Cope**; Cable Ties; Alice Ivy; Alex Lahey; Loose Tooth
Best Live Band	Best Festival
**King Gizzard & the Lizard Wizard**; King Parrot; The Drones; Eddy Current Suppression Ring; The Peep Tempel	**Meredith Music Festival**; Boogie Festival; Cherry Rock; Paradise Music Festival; Sugar Mountain
Best Venue (Over 500 Capacity)	Best Venue (Under 500 Capacity)
**Corner Hotel, Richmond**; 170 Russell; The Croxton Bandroom; Forum, Melbourne; Melbourne Recital Centre	**The Tote, Collingwood**; The Curtin; The Gasometer Hotel, Collingwood; The Old Bar, Fitzroy; Howler
Best Regional Venue	Best Regional Act
**The Bridge Hotel, Castlemaine**; The Barwon Club Hotel, Geelong; Karova Lounge, Ballarat; Meeniyan Town Hall, Meeniyan; The Loft, Warrnambool	**The Drones**; D.D Dumbo; The Murlocs; Orb; C.W. Stoneking

=== Genre Specific Awards ===
Best Blues Album	Best Country Album
**Nick Charles – The River Flows**; Mike Elrington – Two Lucky Stars; Pugsley Buzzard – Skin and Teeth; Steve Boyd's Rum Reverie – Healers and Howlers; The New Savages – Goin' Over the River	**Tracy McNeil & The Goodlife – Thieves**; Bill Jackson – The Wayside Ballads Vol. 2; Matt Joe Gow – Seven Years; Sal Kimber & The Rolling Wheel – Southern Light; Sean McMahon & The Moonmen – Shiner
Best Soul, Funk, R'n'B and Gospel Album	Best Jazz Album
**Kylie Auldist – Family Tree**; 30/70 – Cold Radish Coma; Billy Davis – Bad Ending; Deep Street Soul – Come Alive!; The Sugarcanes – The Sugarcanes	**Peter Knight – Way Out West**; ATM 15 – Human Music; Brenton Foster – Two Cities; Luke Howard Trio – The Electric Night Descends; Mike Nock and Tony Gould – Monash Sessions
Best Hip Hop Album	Best Electronic Act
**Plutonic Lab – Deep Above The Noise**; Discourse – Megalomaniac; Dylan Joel – Authentic Lemonade; Milwaukee Banks – Deep into the Night; Scotty Hinds – Hindsight	**Harvey Sutherland**; András; Client Liaison; NO ZU; Sui Zhen
Best Heavy Album	Best Indigenous Act
**Be'lakor – Vessels**; Acolyte – Shades of Black; King – Reclaim the Darkness; Shepparton Airplane – Shepparton Airplane; Tyranamen – Tyranamen	**Benny Walker**; Dave Arden; Emma Donovan; Kutcha Edwards; Lady Lash
Best Global or Reggae Album	Best Experimental/Avant-Garde Act
**Melbourne Ska Orchestra – Sierra Kilo Alpha**; Bashka – Fihi ma Fihi; Black Jesus Experience – Cradle of Humanity; Malcura – Malcura; San Lazaro – La Despedida	**Inland (Alex Garsden and Rohan Drape)**; Harriet Morgan; Joel Stern; Nik Kennedy; Robin Fox
Best Folk Roots Album	
**Oh Pep! - Stadium Cake**; John Flanagan – There's Another Way to Where You're Going; Dan Parsons – Valleywood; Leah Senior – Summer's On the Ground; Tinpan Orange – Love Is a Dog	
