= Pugsley Buzzard =

Australian musician and actor

Pugsley Buzzard Wateringcan is an Australian musician and actor.

== Life ==
Buzzard comes from a musical family in which he was early influenced to sing and play the piano. But he just took the decision to work as professional musician, after he visited his sister, while she was living in Italy. She made a contact to a Jazz-Club in which he got a job as opener. He decided to make this to his regular job and founded the 'Pugsley Buzzard Trio', in which he plays piano and sings, together with a drummer and a guitarist. As actor he starred in the movie Fags in the Fast Lane, in the TV-Show True Story with Hamish & Andy and several other films and television shows. He currently lives in Portugal.

== Discography ==
=== Albums ===
List of albums, with selected details
Title	Details
Hammer These Tongs	Released: 2006; Format: CD; Label: Pugsley Buzzard
Chicago Typewriter	Released: 2009; Format: CD; Label: Pugsley Buzzard
Wooden Kimono	Released: August 2010; Format: CD; Label: PBW (899237)
Chasin' Aces	Released: 2013; Format: CD; Label: PBW (PBW004)
Skin and Teeth	Released: 2016; Format: CD; Label: PBW

== Awards and nominations ==
=== Music Victoria Awards ===
The Music Victoria Awards are an annual awards night celebrating Victorian music. They commenced in 2006.

Year	Nominee / work	Award	Result	Ref.
Music Victoria Awards of 2016	Skin and Teeth	Best Blues Album	Nominated	
