= Fags in the Fast Lane =

- Film poster
- Directed by: Josh "Sinbad" Collins
- Written by: Josh Collins; Steven G. Michael
- Produced by: Josh Collins
- Starring: Chris Asimos; Kitten Natividad; King Khan; El Vez
- Narrated by: Tex Perkins
- Cinematography: Stuart Simpson
- Edited by: Rob Buttery
- Music by: Raúl Sánchez
- Production company: Zombie Zoo Productions
- Release date: 1 April 2017
- Running time: 90 minutes
- Country: Australia
- Language: English

Fags in the Fast Lane is a 2017 Australian action adventure comedy film directed by Josh "Sinbad" Collins and starring Chris Asimos.

== Plot ==
Kitten informs her son Beau that her car got stolen by a grotesque burlesque gang, sending him on a journey to get the car back.

== Cast ==
- Chris Asimos as Beau
- Ollie Bell as "Squirt"
- Pugsley Buzzard as Chief
- Sasha Čuha as Salome
- Kitten Natividad as Kitten
- Tex Perkins as The Narrator
- Leanne Campbell as Val Kyrie
- King Khan as Hijra
- Xavier Gouault as John "Bandy Legged John"
- Hwee Hall as Rosie
- Justine Jones as Billie Jean

== Filming ==
Filming took place in Melbourne, in the Australian state of Victoria.

== Reception ==
David Black of Ozindiecinema.com gave the film a positive review, calling the film "the leader in the current renaissance of Ozploitation movies. Its recent debut at Melbourne’s grand old Astor theatre was packed to the rafters, with the crowd queuing up past the shopping block to get in."
