= Dylan Joel =

Australian musician

Dylan J
- Birth name: Dylan Joel Smith
- Born: 12 March 1991 (age 34); Melbourne, Australia
- Origin: Melbourne, Australia
- Genres: Rap, Pop, Australian hip hop
- Instrument(s): Guitar, vocals
- Years active: 2012–present
- Labels: Warner Music Australia
- Website: dylanjoel.com

Dylan Smith, who performs as Dylan J (previously Dylan Joel), is an Australian musician, singer, and rapper from Melbourne. He first gained recognition by uploading his songs to Triple J Unearthed. He later signed a deal with Warner Music Australia. He has toured nationally with Bliss n Eso in 2017 and toured internationally with up and coming artist Ruel for most of 2018. Dylan Joel has also toured with NF for his "The Search" world tour throughout 2020.

== Discography ==
=== Albums ===
List of albums, with release date and label shown
Title	Details
Authentic Lemonade	Released: 2 October 2015; Label: It's Official, Warner Music Australia; Formats: Digital download, streaming
You were made to blossom	Released: 29 March 2019; Label: Dylan Joel, Warner Music Australia; Formats: Digital download, streaming

== Extended plays ==
List of EP, with release date and label shown
Title	Details
Bad at Love	Released: 3 September 2020; Label: Dylan Joel, Warner Music Australia; Formats: Digital download, streaming
4 Songs I Made in California	Released: 19 May 2022; Label: Dylan Joel, Warner Music Australia; Formats: Digital download, streaming

=== Singles ===
List of singles, with year released, selected chart positions, certifications, and album name shown
Title	Year	Album
"Numbers"	2014	Authentic Lemonade
"Swing" (with Mantra and DJ IZM)	2016	Authentic Lemonade
"What's Good"	2016	Authentic Lemonade
"Hola, Hola"	2017	You were made to blossom
"Run to the River"	2018	You were made to blossom
"Done Witchu"	2018	You were made to blossom
"Hollering Love"	2018	You were made to blossom
"Snow"	2020	TBA
"Fall Too Easily"	2020	Bad At Love
"Notice Me" (with Ruel)	2021	4 Songs I Made in California

== Awards and nominations ==
=== Music Victoria Awards ===
The Music Victoria Awards are an annual awards night celebrating Victorian music. They commenced in 2006.

Year	Nominee / work	Award	Result	Ref.
Music Victoria Awards of 2016	Authentic Lemonade	Best Hip Hop Album	Nominated	
