= You Remain =

Single by Kungs featuring Ritual

from the album Layers
- Released: 27 October 2016
- Genre: Pop
- Length: 3:43
- Label: House of Barclay
- Songwriter(s): Kungs; Adam Midgley; Tommy Baxter; Gez O'Connel
- Producer(s): Kungs

Kungs singles chronology
"I Feel So Bad" (2016)	"You Remain" (2016)	"More Mess" (2017)

"You Remain" is a song performed by French DJ and record producer Kungs, featuring vocals from Ritual. The song was released as a digital download in France on 27 October 2016 as the fourth single from his debut studio album Layers (2016). The song has peaked at number 45 on the French Singles Chart. The song was written by Kungs, Adam Midgley, Tommy Baxter and Gez O'Connel.

== Music video ==
A music video to accompany the release of "You Remain" was first released onto YouTube on 27 October 2016 at a total length of three minutes and forty-five seconds.

== Track listing ==
Digital download
No.	Title	Length
1.	"You Remain" (featuring Ritual)	3:43

== Chart performance ==
Chart (2016)	Peak position
France (SNEP)	45

== Release history ==
Region	Date	Format	Label
France	27 October 2016	Digital download	House of Barclay
