= Cookin' on 3 Burners =

Australian funk trio

- Origin: Melbourne, Australia
- Genres: R&B; soul; funk
- Years active: 1997–present
- Labels: Freestyle; Knowfoowl; Soul Messin'; Warner
- Members: Jake Mason; Ivan Khatchoyan; Dan West
- Past members: Lance Ferguson; Matt Kirsch
- Website: cookinon3burners.com

Cookin' on 3 Burners are an Australian funk trio from Melbourne, consisting of Jake Mason, Dan West and Ivan Khatchoyan. Their 2009 song "This Girl" was remixed by French DJ and record producer Kungs and released in February 2016. It became a massive hit, peaking at number one in France, Germany, Belgium, Hungary, Latvia, Scotland and number 2 on the UK Singles Chart.

== History ==
=== Formation and early releases ===
Originally made up of Hammond organ player Jake Mason, guitarist Lance Ferguson, and drummer Ivan Khatchoyan, the trio formed in 1997. In 2000 they released Steamed Up on the Newmarket Music label. The instrumental album features Melbourne-based guitarist Matt Kirsch. In 2002 the ensemble released their first 7" single, "Gravel Rash/Pie Warmer" on the Bamboo Shack label and in 2005 they signed to Knowfoowl Records (for Australia and New Zealand) and UK-based label Freestyle Records (ROW).

=== Baked, Broiled and Fried (2007) ===
Their first album on Freestyle and Knowfoowl Records, Baked, Broiled & Fried, was released in 2007. The 13-track album included 11 instrumentals and two vocal tracks featuring Kylie Auldist and Fallon Williams. The album featured a reworking of Gorillaz' track "Feel Good Inc.", which also became popular with the B-boy community. The trio toured and performed alongside acts such as Alice Russell, Quantic, Fat Freddy's Drop, and Sharon Jones & The Dap-Kings.

=== Soul Messin' (2009) ===
In 2009, Cookin' on 3 Burners released their second album, Soul Messin'. The record received praise for its cover of Gary Numan's song, "Cars" while the album's lead single, "This Girl", featuring Kylie Auldist on vocals, reached the number one spot on the UK iTunes R&B chart.

In 2013, Ferguson left the group to focus on his own project, The Bamboos, and was replaced by Dan West.

=== Blind Bet (2014) ===
In 2014 the group released its third record on Freestyle, Blind Bet, which featured artists including Daniel Merriweather, Harry Angus, Kylie Auldist, Jason Heerah, and the Cruel Sea frontman Tex Perkins.

=== "The Writing's on the Wall" (2015) ===
In 2015 Cookin' on 3 Burners again collaborated with Tex Perkins on the single "The Writing's on the Wall".

The group also began working with the Australian hip hop artist Mantra. The collaboration took the band in a new direction, introducing more hip hop-based tempos and funk/electro vibes to their mixes.

=== Remix of "This Girl" by Kungs (2016) ===
In 2016 Cookin' on 3 Burners collaborated with French electronic producer Kungs on a reworking of "This Girl". The song was originally included on the trio's 2009 album Soul Messin' and released as a limited edition 7". The Kungs vs Cookin' on 3 Burners version of "This Girl" was released on 28 February on the House of Barclay label. The song reached number 1 in France, Germany and charted highly across Europe.

=== Cookin' the Books (2025) ===
In October 2025, the trio released Cookin' the Books, their first album in six years.

== Members ==
- Jake Mason – Hammond organ (1997–present)
- Ivan Khatchoyan – drums (1997–present)
- Lance Ferguson – guitar (1997–1999, 2001–2013)
- Matt Kirsch – guitar (2000–2001)
- Dan West – guitar (2013–present)

== Discography ==
=== Studio albums ===
List of studio albums, with selected details
Title	Details
Baked, Broiled & Fried	Released: 1 October 2007; Format: CD, digital download; Label: Soul Messin'
Soul Messin'	Released: 29 June 2009; Format: CD, digital download; Label: Soul Messin'
Blind Bet	Released: 20 June 2014; Format: CD, digital download; Label: Freestyle
Lab Experiments Vol. 1	Released: 27 May 2017; Format: CD, digital download; Label: Soul Messin'
Lab Experiments Vol. 2	Released: 19 October 2018; Format: CD, digital download, streaming; Label: Cookin' on 3 Burners Records
Cookin' the Books	Released: 31 October 2025; Format: CD, digital download; Label: Soul Messin'

=== Live albums ===
List of live albums, with selected details
Title	Details
Brunswick St Breakdown Live	Released: 27 November 2007; Format: CD, digital download; Label: Soul Messin'

=== Compilation albums ===
List of compilation albums, with selected details
Title	Details
Vs.	Released: 24 March 2017 4 November 2016 (initial digital release); Format: CD, digital download; Label: Warner

=== Extended plays ===
List of EPs, with selected details
Title	Details
Cars	Released: 29 June 2009; Format: CD, digital download; Label: Freestyle

=== Singles ===
List of singles, with selected chart positions and certifications
Year	Title	Peak chart positions										Certifications	Album
Year	Title	AUS	AUT	DEN	FRA	GER	NL	NOR	SWE	SWI	UK	Certifications	Album
2006	"Keb's Bucket"	—	—	—	—	—	—	—	—	—	—		Baked, Broiled and Fried
2007	"Cook It"	—	—	—	—	—	—	—	—	—	—		Baked, Broiled and Fried
2009	"This Girl" (with Kylie Auldist)	—	—	—	—	—	—	—	—	—	—		Soul Messin'
2014	"Mind Made Up" (with Kylie Auldist)	—	—	—	—	—	—	—	—	—	—		Blind Bet
2014	"Losin' Streak" (with Daniel Merriweather)	—	—	—	—	—	—	—	—	—	—		Blind Bet
2016	"This Girl" (Kungs vs. Cookin' on 3 Burners)	17	2	9	1	1	3	20	8	8	2	ARIA: Platinum; BPI: 4× Platinum; IFPI DEN: Gold; SNEP: Diamond	Layers
2016	"Mind Made Up" (Lenno vs. Cookin' on 3 Burners with Kylie Auldist)	—	—	—	—	—	—	—	—	—	—		Vs.
2017	"Real Life Baby" (with Emi)	—	—	—	—	—	—	—	—	—	—		Lab Experiments Vol. 1
2018	"Warning" (with Kaiit)	—	—	—	—	—	—	—	—	—	—		Lab Experiments Vol. 2
2019	"Force of Nature" (with Henri Purnell & Revelries)	—	—	—	—	—	—	—	—	—	—		Non-album single
"—" denotes a single that did not chart or was not released in that territory.

== Awards and nominations ==
=== AIR Awards ===
The Australian Independent Record Awards (commonly known informally as AIR Awards) is an annual awards night to recognise, promote and celebrate the success of Australia's Independent Music sector.

Year	Nominee / work	Award	Result	Ref.
2026	Cookin' the Books	Best Independent Soul/R&B Album or EP	Nominated	

=== APRA Music Awards ===
Year	Nominee / work	Award	Result
2017	"This Girl" (Kungs vs. Cookin' on 3 Burners)	Dance Work of the Year	Nominated
2018	"Mind Made Up" (Lenno vs. Cookin' on 3 Burners)	Dance Work of the Year	Nominated

=== ARIA Music Awards ===
Year	Nominee / work	Award	Result
2016	"This Girl"	Song of the Year	Nominated

=== Music Victoria Awards ===
The Music Victoria Awards, are an annual awards night celebrating Victorian music. They commenced in 2005.

Year	Nominee / work	Award	Result
2014	Blind Bet	Best Soul/Funk/R&B and Gospel Album	Won
2017	Lab Experiments Vol 1	Best Soul/Funk/R&B and Gospel Album	Nominated
