= Jake Mason =

Australian musician

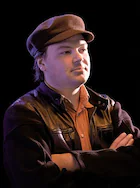

Background information
- Born: Jake Edward Mason; 7 March 1977 (age 48); Victoria, Australia
- Origin: Australia
- Genres: R&B; soul; funk; Jazz
- Occupations: Musician; Songwriter; Producer; Teacher
- Instruments: Hammond Organ; Keyboards; Saxophone

Jake Mason is an Australian musician, producer and songwriter. He is a founding member of Cookin' on 3 Burners (Mason, Ivan Khatchoyan and Dan West) and the frontman of the Jake Mason Trio. The Jake Mason Trio (Mason, James Sherlock and Danny Fischer) was nominated for the 2018 ARIA Award for Best Jazz Album for their album The Stranger In The Mirror.

== Discography ==
=== Albums ===
List of albums, with selected details
Title	Details
The Stranger in the Mirror (as Jake Mason Trio)	Released: May 2018; Format: CD, Digital, LP; Label: Soul Messin' Records (SMRCD-0118)
Growing Pains	Released: November 2018; Format: CD, Digital; Label: The 88 Keys
The Modern Ark (as Jake Mason Trio)	Released: February 2026; Format: CD, Digital, LP; Label: Soul Messin' Records (SMRLP-0225)

== Awards and nominations ==
=== ARIA Music Awards ===
The ARIA Music Awards is an annual awards ceremony that recognises excellence, innovation, and achievement across all genres of Australian music. They commenced in 1987.

Year	Nominee / work	Award	Result	Ref.
2018	The Stranger in the Mirror]	Best Jazz Album	Nominated	
