= Kungs =

French DJ and record producer (born 1996)

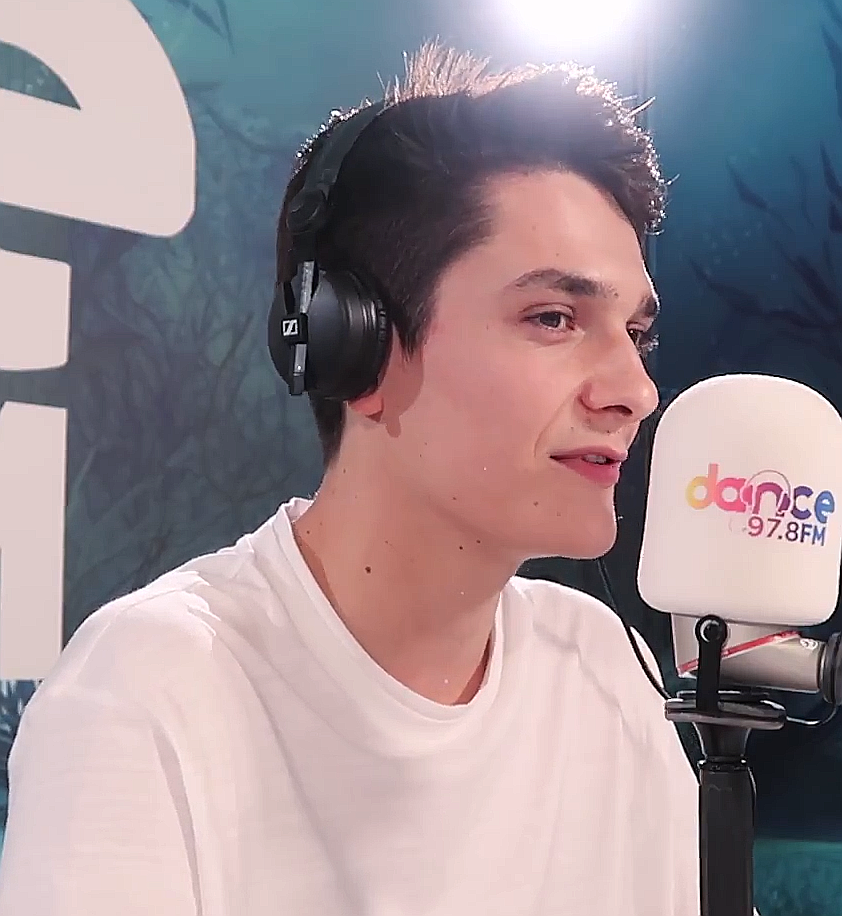
- Kungs during an interview with Dance FM (Dubai, UAE) in 2018.

Background information
- Born: Valentin Brunel; 17 December 1996 (age 29); Toulon, France
- Genres: House; deep house; tropical house; tech house
- Occupations: DJ; record producer; musician
- Years active: 2015–present
- Label: House of Barclay
- Website: kungs-music.com

Valentin Brunel (French pronunciation: [valɑ̃tɛ̃ bʁynɛl]; born 17 December 1996), better known by his stage name Kungs (/kʊŋz/ KUUNGZ), is a French DJ, record producer and musician. A native of Toulon, he released his first album, Layers, in 2016 after success with "This Girl", a collaboration with Cookin' on 3 Burners that became an international hit for him, and the follow-ups "Don't You Know" featuring Jamie N Commons and "I Feel So Bad" featuring Ephemerals.

== Career ==
Valentin chose the stage name 'KUNGS' ("mister" in Latvian) after searching online for the translation of the word 'gentleman' in various languages. He began playing music when he was five, playing a djembe that was a gift from his parents. He grew up listening to rock and roll classics with his father, including The Who and The Kooks. He began writing and posting online his own compositions when he was seventeen. His remixes of "Jamming" by Bob Marley and the Wailers and "West Coast" by Lana Del Rey featuring new vocals from Molly both reached several million plays on SoundCloud and YouTube. Kungs's remix of Lost Frequencies' "Are You with Me" achieved more than 16 million views on YouTube. In January 2016, he was the opener of some performances in Europe on David Guetta's Listen Tour.

Kungs released his first extended play This Girl in 2016 following his remix of Cookin' on 3 Burners "This Girl", which reached number 1 in France, Germany and Switzerland and number 2 on the UK Singles Chart in 2016. He has since released the single "Don't You Know" featuring Jamie N Commons and "I Feel So Bad" featuring Ephemerals. Kungs' three 2016 singles were released on his debut album Layers, which was released on 4 November.

On 23 March 2018 Kungs played a live set at the Miami Ultra Music Festival. He followed acts from fellow artists Raiden and Kosuke to perform his individual set on the 2018 Ultra Main Stage.

On 22 July 2018 he performed at the electronic dance music festival Tomorrowland in Belgium.

== Discography ==
=== Albums ===
Title	Details	Peak chart positions								Certifications
Title	Details	FRA	AUT	CAN	GER	ITA	LIT	UK Dance	US	Certifications
Layers	Released: 4 November 2016; Label: House of Barclay; Format: CD, LP, digital download	10	74	33	56	—	—	4	196	SNEP: 2× Platinum
Club Azur	Released: 18 March 2022; Label: Island; Format: CD, LP, digital download	11	—	—	—	33	60	—	—	SNEP: Gold; FIMI: Gold
Out Loud	Release: 13 March 2026; Label: Island; Format: CD, digital download, streaming	109	—	—	—	—	—	—	—	

=== Singles ===
Title	Year	Peak chart positions										Certifications	Album
Title	Year	FRA	AUS	AUT	BEL (Wa)	DEN	GER	ITA	SWE	SWI	UK	Certifications	Album
"This Girl" (Kungs vs. Cookin' on 3 Burners)	2016	1	17	2	1	9	1	6	8	6	2	SNEP: Diamond; ARIA: Platinum; BPI: 4× Platinum; BRMA: 2× Platinum; BVMI: Diamond; FIMI: 4× Platinum; GLF: 3× Platinum; IFPI AUT: Gold; IFPI DEN: 2× Platinum	Layers
"Don't You Know" (featuring Jamie N Commons)	2016	5	—	8	15	—	16	—	—	17	172	SNEP: Diamond; BVMI: Gold	Layers
"I Feel So Bad" (featuring Ephemerals)	2016	3	—	—	18	—	88	—	—	52	—	SNEP: Diamond	Layers
"You Remain" (featuring Ritual)	2016	45	—	—	— (Note: "You Remain" did not reach the region's Ultratop 50 chart, but charted at number 15 on the Ultratip Bubbling Under ranking.)	—	—	—	—	—	—		Layers
"More Mess" (featuring Olly Murs and Coely)	2017	20	—	—	— (Note: "More Mess" did not reach the region's Ultratop 50 chart, but charted at number 17 on the Ultratip Bubbling Under ranking.)	—	—	—	—	—	—		Non-album singles
"Be Right Here" (with Stargate featuring Goldn)	2018	15	—	—	— (Note: "Be Right Here" did not reach the region's Ultratop 50 chart, but charted at number six on the Ultratip Bubbling Under ranking.)	—	—	—	—	—	—		Non-album singles
"Disco Night" (with Throttle)	2018	—	—	—	—	—	—	—	—	—	—		Non-album singles
"Paris"	2019	—	—	—	—	—	—	—	—	—	—		Club Azur
"Dopamine" (featuring J.Hart)	2020	—	—	—	— (Note: "Dopamine" did not reach the region's Ultratop 50 chart, but charted at number 36 on the Ultratip Bubbling Under ranking.)	—	—	—	—	—	—		Non-album single
"Never Going Home"	2021	5	—	—	1	—	47	13	—	16	—	SNEP: Diamond; BVMI: Gold; FIMI: 2× Platinum	Club Azur
"Regarde-moi"	2021	—	—	—	—	—	—	—	—	—	—		Club Azur
"Lipstick"	2021	148	—	—	38	—	—	74	—	—	—	SNEP: Gold; FIMI: Gold	Club Azur
"Clap Your Hands"	2022	19	—	—	4	—	—	22	—	—	—	SNEP: Diamond; FIMI: 2× Platinum	Club Azur
"Substitution" (with Purple Disco Machine featuring Julian Perretta)	2023	26	—	23	6	—	18	69	—	29	—	SNEP: Diamond; BRMA: Platinum; BVMI: Gold; FIMI: Platinum; IFPI AUT: Platinum; IFPI SWI: Platinum	Non-album singles
"Shadows" (with Carlita)	2023	—	—	—	—	—	—	—	—	—	—		Non-album singles
"Need a Hit" (with Gero)	2023	—	—	—	—	—	—	—	—	—	—		Non-album singles
"All Night Long" (with David Guetta and Izzy Bizu)	2024	118	—	—	—	—	—	—	— (Note: "All Night Long" did not enter the Swedish Singellista Chart, but peaked at number 15 on the Swedish Heatseeker Chart.)	—	—	SNEP: Gold	Non-album singles
"Please Be Mine" (with DJ Seinfeld)	2024	—	—	—	—	—	—	—	—	—	—		Non-album singles
"Light Me Up" (with Pnau)	2025	—	—	—	—	—	—	—	—	—	—		Ahhcade
"Galaxy" (with Theophilus London)	2026	—	—	—	8	—	—	—	—	—	—		Out Loud
"—" denotes a single that did not chart or was not released in that territory.

=== Promotional singles ===
Title	Year	Album
"To Describe You" (Mozambo & Kungs featuring Molly)	2015	Non-album singles
"We'll Meet Again"	2015	Non-album singles

=== Other charting singles ===
Title	Year	Peak chart positions	Album
Title	Year	FRA	Album
"Melody" (featuring Luke Pritchard)	2016	144	Layers

== Awards and nominations ==
Year	Awards	Category	Recipient	Outcome	Ref
2016	NRJ Music Awards	Best New DJ	Kungs	Nominated	
2016	NRJ Music Awards	Best Single Dance/Electro	"This Girl"	Won	
2016	LOS40 Music Awards	International New Act of the Year	Kungs	Won	
2017	Electronic Music Awards	New Artist of the Year	Kungs	Nominated	
