= 2024 Summer Paralympics closing ceremony =

Closing ceremony

- Part of 2024 Summer Paralympics
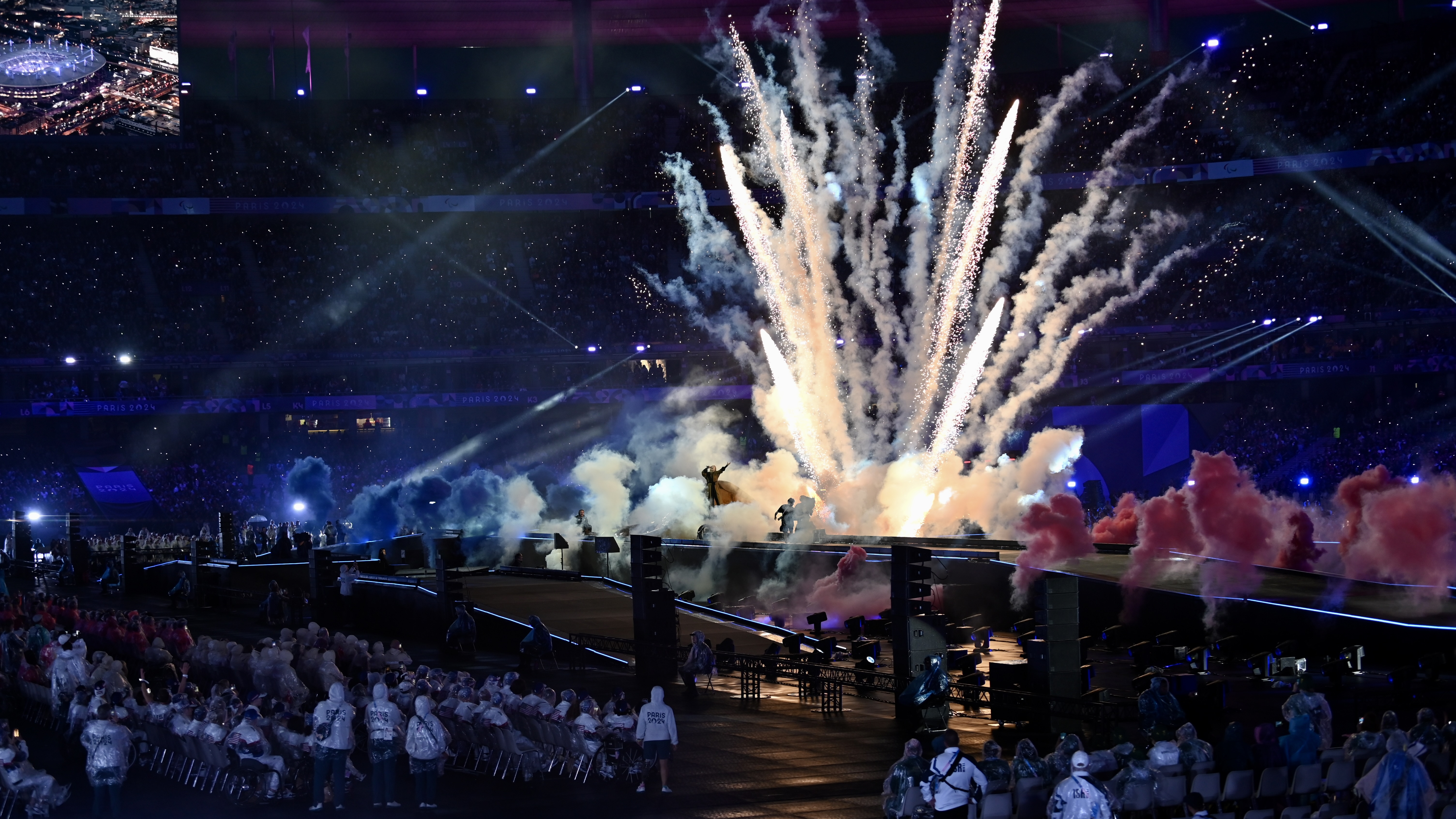
- Stade de France during the closing ceremony.
- Date: 8 September 2024
- Time: 20:30 – 23:00 CEST (UTC+2)
- Venue: Stade de France
- Location: Saint-Denis, France
- Also known as: Paris est une Fête
- Filmed by: Olympic Broadcasting Services (OBS)
- Footage: The ceremony on the IPC YouTube channel on YouTube

The closing ceremony of the 2024 Summer Paralympics took place at the Stade de France in Saint-Denis, France, on 8 September 2024.

The ceremony featured cultural presentations from both the current (France) and following (United States) host countries, as well as closing remarks by International Paralympic Committee president Andrew Parsons and the COJOP2024 President Tony Estanguet; the official handover of the Paralympic flag from Paris mayor Anne Hidalgo to Los Angeles mayor Karen Bass, whose city would host the 2028 Summer Paralympics; and the extinguishing of the Paralympic Flame. The ceremony featured a mix of filmed and live segments, which included the Los Angeles 2028 presentation, recorded in Venice, Los Angeles.

== Officials ==
Was expected the presence of around 4,463 athletes from the 169 participating National Paralympic Committees and also around 1,300 delegates at the field. Just as the Olympics opening ceremony less than two months earlier, it took place in pouring rain, which drenched the performers and athletes, although the crowd remained dry.

Dignitaries present included the Mayor of Paris, Anne Hidalgo, the President of France, Emmanuel Macron, Los Angeles mayor Karen Bass, United States Secretary of Health and Human Services Xavier Becerra, the president of Paris Organising Committee for the 2024 Olympic and Paralympic Games, Tony Estanguet, and International Paralympic Committee president Andrew Parsons, who closed the games.

== Proceedings ==
The closing ceremony took place at the Stade de France and, as per tradition, involved a parade of flags and athletes and the handover ceremony. It was officially titled "Paris est une Fête", a large open-air party to celebrate the end of the Games that would pay tribute to the history of electronic music and the cultural history of Paris. As with the opening ceremony, the closing ceremony was directed by Thomas Jolly; he stated that "we want to get the capital buzzing for one last dance, offering a musical and luminous climax that will bring the whole world together for an unforgettable night".

=== The cauldron's last flight ===
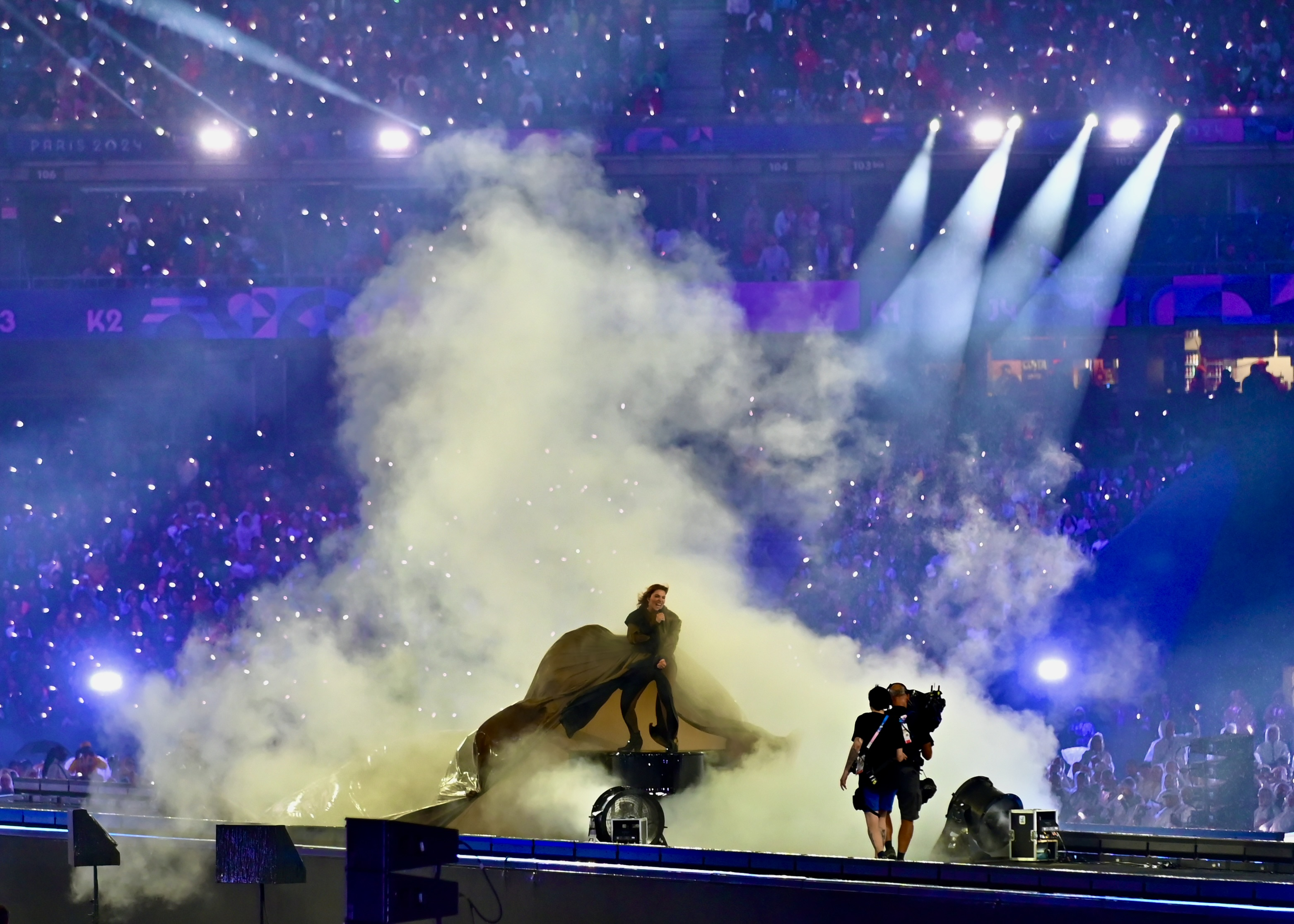
French singer Santa opened the festivities.

French singer Santa opened the festivities, performing Vivre pour le meilleur by Johnny Hallyday. The performance was accompanied by video sequences of images from the closing ceremonies of the three previous Games. French producer Victor Le Masne's Parade, the anthem of the Paris 2024 Games, was sounded to launch a celebration of the athletes who participated in the games.

=== Protocol segments ===
The national anthem of France, La Marseillaise, was played by André Feydy, a trumpeter with a disability, and the French flag was raised by military personnel. The flags of the 169 participating nations were paraded, accompanied by music from the French Republican Guard Band, who played popular tunes such as Les Champs-Élysées and Gloria Gaynor’s I Will Survive. Video highlights of the Games were shown.

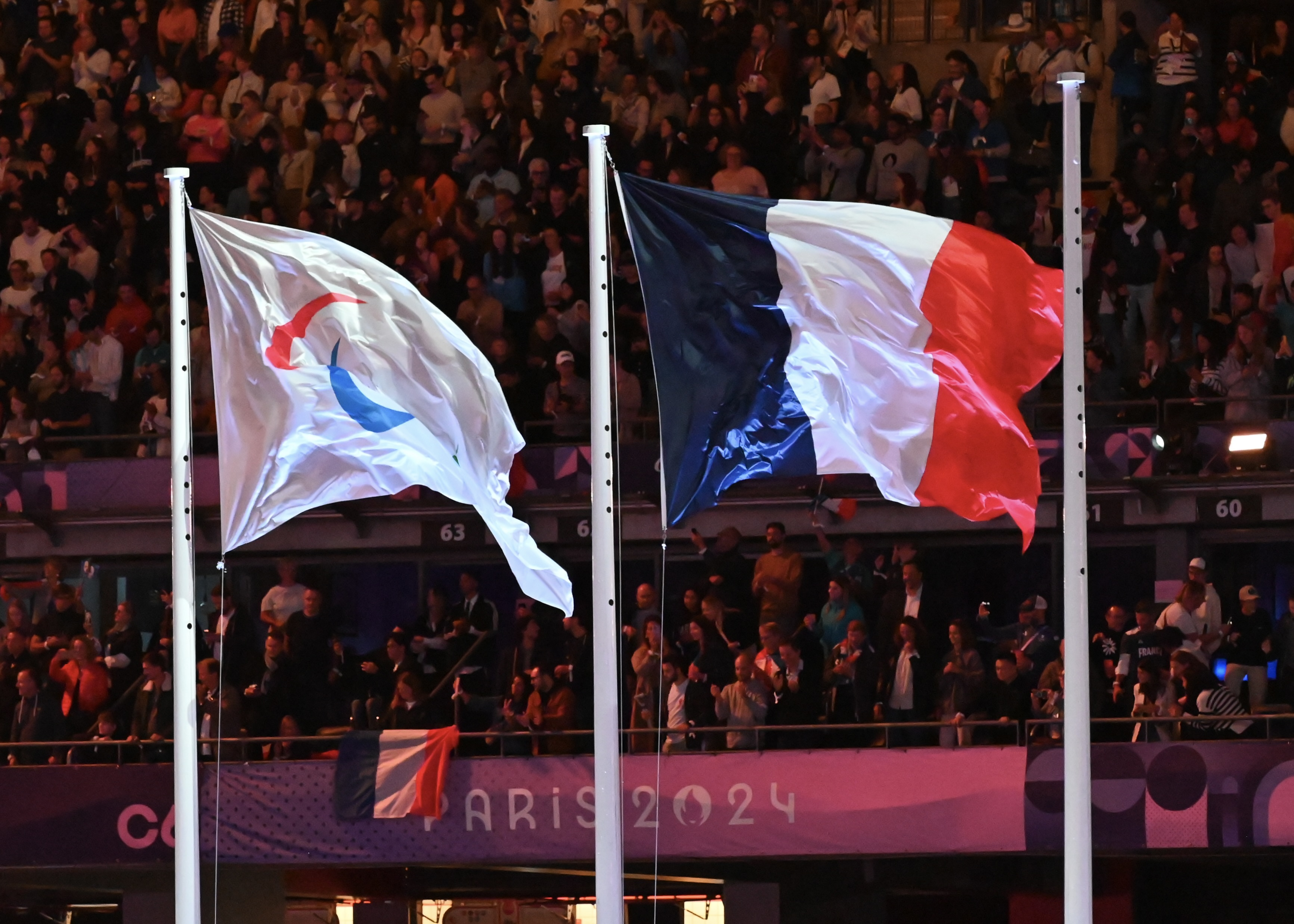
Paralympic flag is lowered

Speeches were given by Tony Estanguet and Andrew Parsons, with Parsons welcoming the commitment to make the Paris Métro accessible as a legacy of the Games. The six newly elected members of the International Paralympic Committee Athletes' Council were introduced: Lenine Cunha from Portugal, the first athlete with an intellectual disability to join the Council; Vladyslava Kravchenko a swimmer from Malta; Martina Caironi, a para-athlete from Italy; Yoomin Won, a wheelchair basketball player from South Korea; Tan Yujiao, a powerlifter from China; and Denise Schindler, a para-cyclist from Germany.

=== Breaking comes to the Stadium ===
Two thousand of the volunteers who had supported the games paraded while the band played Johnny Hallyday's Que je t'aime. Eight break dancers, some with disabilities, performed, a nod to the introduction of breaking to the Olympic Program. French DJ Cut Killer supplied the music, with mixes that included Jacques Dutronc's Les Cactus, Suprême NTM's Seine-Saint-Denis Style and Manu Dibango's Soul Makossa.

=== Handover to LA28 ===
The Paralympic flag was lowered while the band played the Paralympic Anthem. The Mayor of Paris, Anne Hidalgo, handed the flag back to the President of the International Paralympic Committee, Andrew Parsons, who, in turn, handed it over to the Mayor of Los Angeles, Karen Bass. The national anthem of the United States of America was then sung by Tony Award winner Ali Stroker.

"California Dreamin'" by the Mamas & the Papas was played, and there was a video featuring four Los Angeles–based Paralympians: Lauren Ridloff, Samantha Bosco, Ezra Frech and Jamal Hill. The action shifted to the Venice Beach Skatepark in Los Angeles, where adaptive athletes including Oscar Loreto Jr., Kanya Sesser and Aaron “Wheelz” Fotheringham put on a skateboarding display. Music was provided by jazz pianist Matthew Whitaker, violinist and Broadway composer Gaelynn Lea, rapper, songwriter and athlete Garnet Silver-Hall, and Anderson .Paak.

=== The Flame is extinguished ===
At the Jardin des Tuileries, blind musical duo Amadou and Mariam, accompanied by a string quartet, performed Serge Gainsbourg's Je suis venu te dire que je m'en vais while the flames below the Paralympics cauldron were extinguished. Meanwhile, six French Paralympic athletes medallists brought the Paralympic flame into the Stade de France: swimmer Ugo Didier and blind footballer Frédéric Villeroux, the first and last French gold medallists of the games; Charles Noakes, a gold medallist in badminton; Gloria Agblemagnon, a silver medallist in athletics; Aurélie Aubert, France's first Paralympic boccia champion and one of its closing ceremony flag bearers; and cyclist Mathieu Bosredon, France's most successful athlete at the games who won three gold medals in cycling. Aubert and Bosredon blew out the flame.

=== Journey of the wave ===
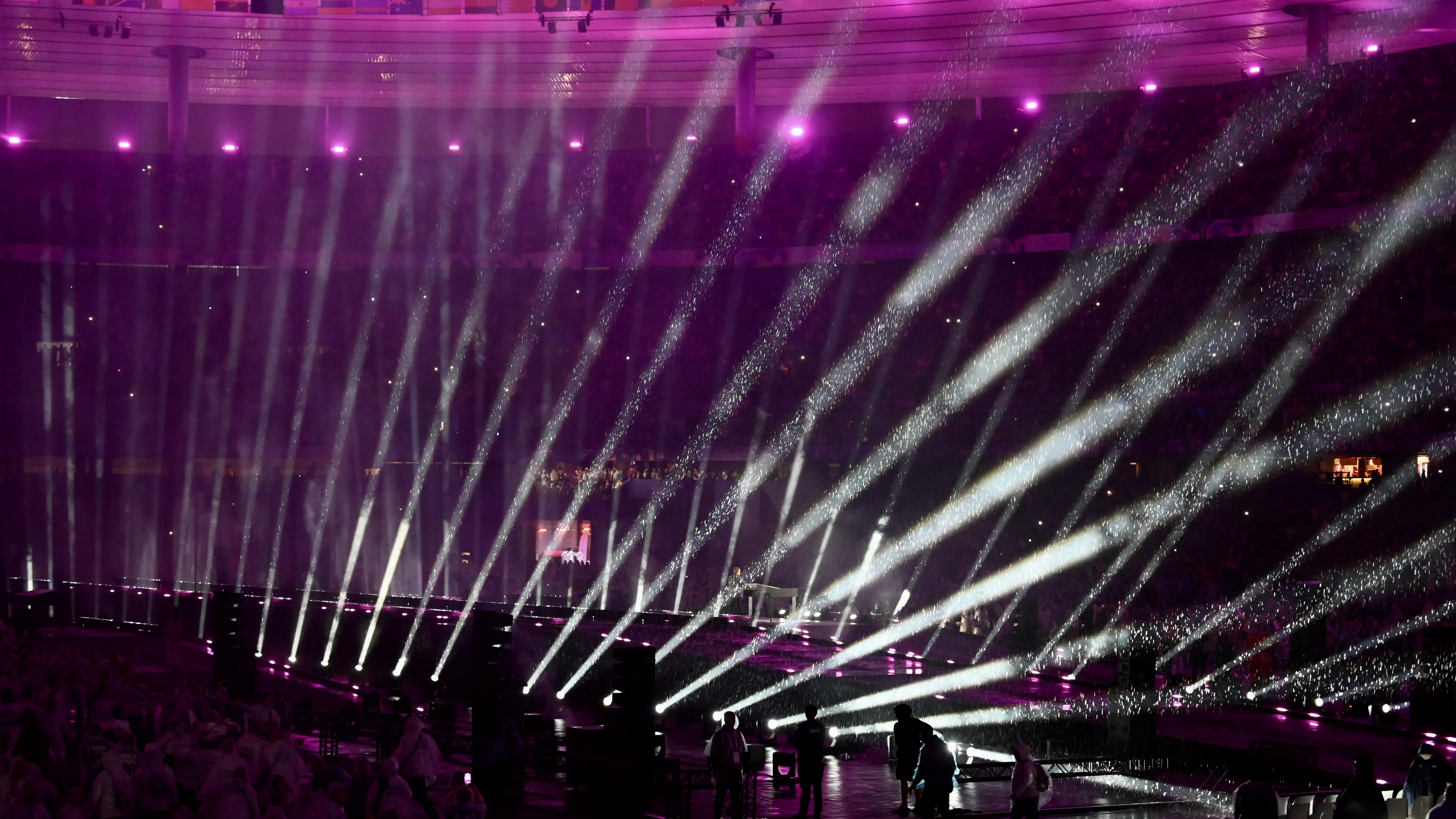
Closing ceremony electronic music

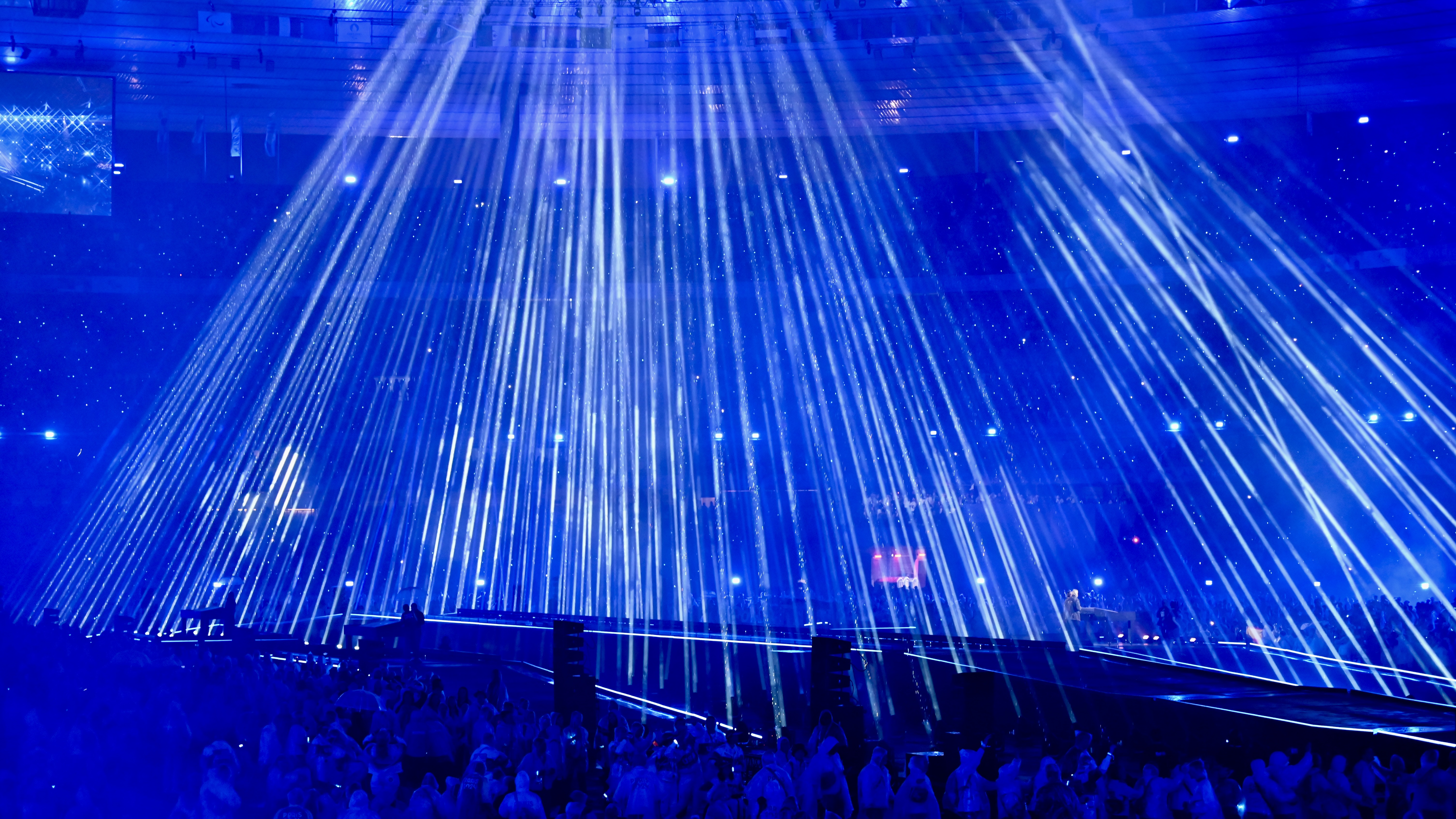
Closing ceremony electronic music

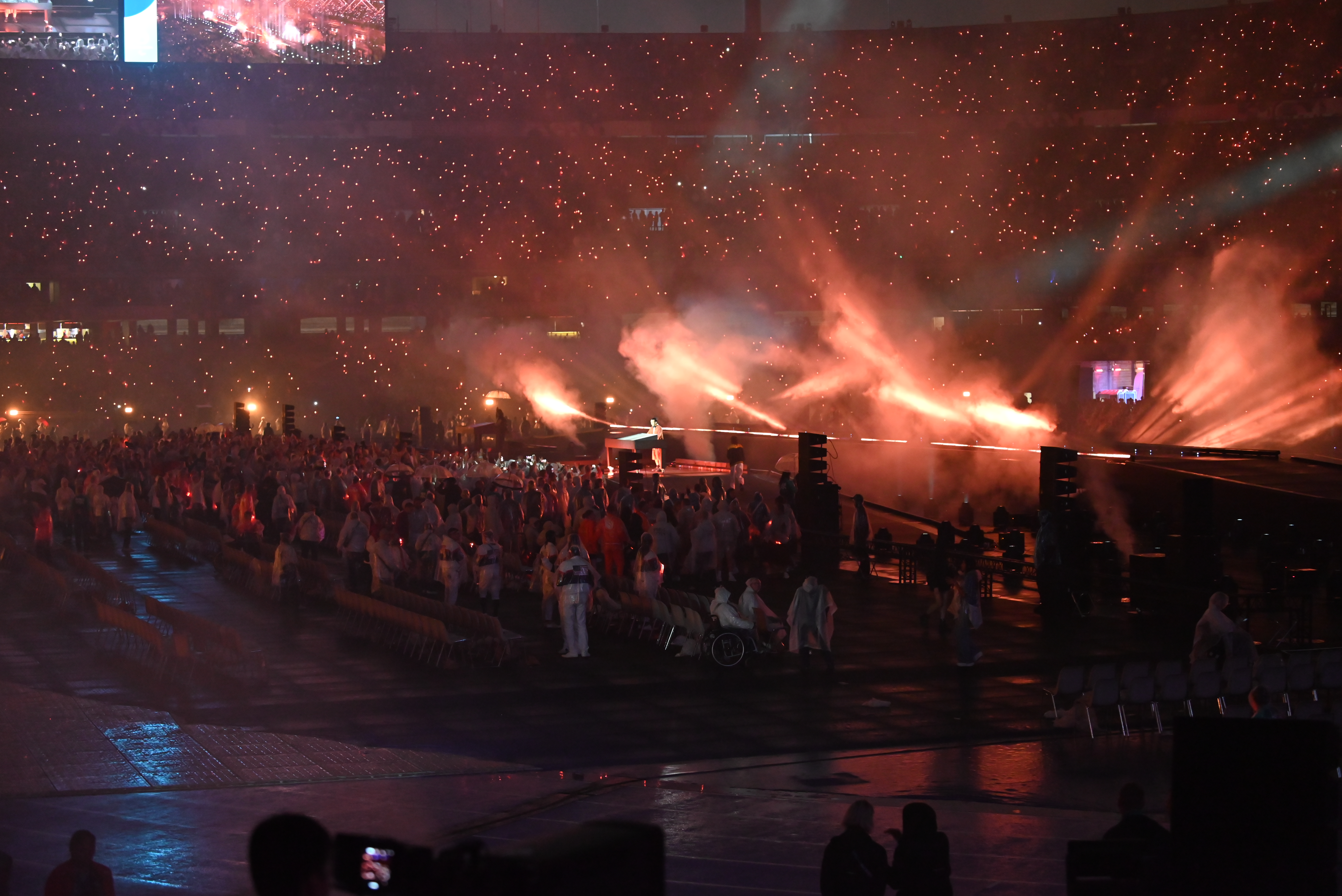
Closing ceremony electronic music

With the formalities over, French composer Jean-Michel Jarre, the father of electronic music in France, assembled twenty-three other DJs to turn the Stade de France into a discotheque to bring the ceremony to a loud finale:

1. Jean-Michel Jarre : Les Mots bleus, Medley ("Intro", "Glory", "Equinoxe Part 4", "Oxygène (Part II)", "Oxygène (Part IV)")

(JMJ Rework Of Astral Projection Remix), Quatrième Rendez-Vous, Brutalism, Zero Gravity (Above & Beyond Remix), Stardust .

1. Breakbot : Baby I'm Yours
2. Nathalie Duchene : Praia
3. Alan Braxe : Intro
4. DJ Falcon with Panda Bear : Step by Step
5. Étienne de Crécy : Am I Wrong
6. Cassius : Cassius 1999
7. Kavinsky : Roadgame
8. Busy P : We Are Your Friends x Signatune x I Love U So
9. Boston Bun : Missing You
10. Tatyana Jane : Psaume 92
11. Kiddy Smile : Make Love
12. GЯEG : Dembow Tronico
13. Chloé Caillet : Costa
14. Agoria : Scala
15. Irène Drésel : Vestale
16. Chloé : Mars 500
17. Kittin : Forever Ravers
18. Anetha : Whistleblower
19. Polo & Pan : Nanã
20. Ofenbach : Be Mine
21. The Avener : Fade Out Lines
22. Kungs : Mix (Never Going Home, Clap Your Hands, This Girl)
23. Victor Le Masne : Higher
24. Jean-Michel Jarre : The Time Machine ( Laser harp from the top of the stadium )
25. Martin Solveig : Mix (Madan, Hello)
