= Club Azur =

Studio album by Kungs
- Released: 18 March 2022
- Length: 39:37
- Label: Val; Def Jam
- Producer: Boys Noize; Good Times Ahead; Kungs; The Knocks

Kungs chronology
Layers (2016)	Club Azur (2022)

Singles from Club Azur
- 1. "Paris" Released: 29 November 2019; 2. "Never Going Home" Released: 21 May 2021; 3. "Regarde-moi" Released: 5 August 2021; 4. "Lipstick" Released: 28 October 2021; 5. "Clap Your Hands" Released: 18 February 2022

Club Azur is the second studio album written and conducted by French DJ and record producer Kungs. It was released on 18 March 2022 by Val and Def Jam.

== Track listing ==
Club Azur track listing
No.	Title	Writer(s)	Producer(s)	Length
1.	"Zebulon"	Valentin Brunel	Kungs	0:48
2.	"Fashion" (with Boys Noize)	Brunel; Alexander Ridha	Kungs; Boys Noize; Hal Ritson; Richard Adlam	4:31
3.	"Never Going Home"	Brunel; Ridha; Martin Picandet; Amanda Warner; Peter Wade; Andrea Tirone	Kungs; Boys Noize	2:49
4.	"Clap Your Hands"	Brunel; Ridha; Warner; Wade; Alfredo "Larry" Pignagnoli; Ivana Spagna; Ottavio Bacciocchi; Andrew Jackson; Thomas Mann	Kungs; Boys Noize	3:09
5.	"Quanto Tempo" (with Victor Flash and Adela Jans)	Brunel; Victor Flash; Adela Jens	Kungs; Victor Flash; Upsilone	4:05
6.	"Lipstick"	Brunel; Picandet; Warner; Wade; Tirone	Kungs; Boys Noize	3:00
7.	"Lullaby"	Brunel	Kungs; Boys Noize	4:08
8.	"People" (with The Knocks)	Brunel; Ben Ruttner; James Patterson; Andrew Bullimore; Kaelyn Behr	Kungs; Boys Noize; The Knocks	3:44
9.	"Regarde-moi"	Brunel	Kungs; Boys Noize	3:01
10.	"Without You" (with Good Times Ahead)	Brunel; Matthew Van Toth; Julio Mejia; Harrison Brome	Kungs; Good Times Ahead	5:42
11.	"Paris"	Brunel	Kungs	4:32
Total length:				39:37

== Charts ==
Chart performance for Club Azur
Chart (2022)	Peak position
Belgian Albums (Ultratop Flanders)	192
Belgian Albums (Ultratop Wallonia)	106
French Albums (SNEP)	11
Italian Albums (FIMI)	33
Swiss Albums (Schweizer Hitparade)	45

== Certifications ==
Certifications for Club Azur
Region	Certification	Certified units/sales
France (SNEP)	Gold	50,000^{‡}
Italy (FIMI)	Gold	25,000^{‡}
Poland (ZPAV)	Platinum	20,000^{‡}
^{‡} Sales+streaming figures based on certification alone.

== Release history ==
Release history for Club Azur
Region	Release date	Format	Label
France	18 March 2022	Digital download; CD	Val; Def Jam
