= MNDR =

American singer and songwriter (born 1982)

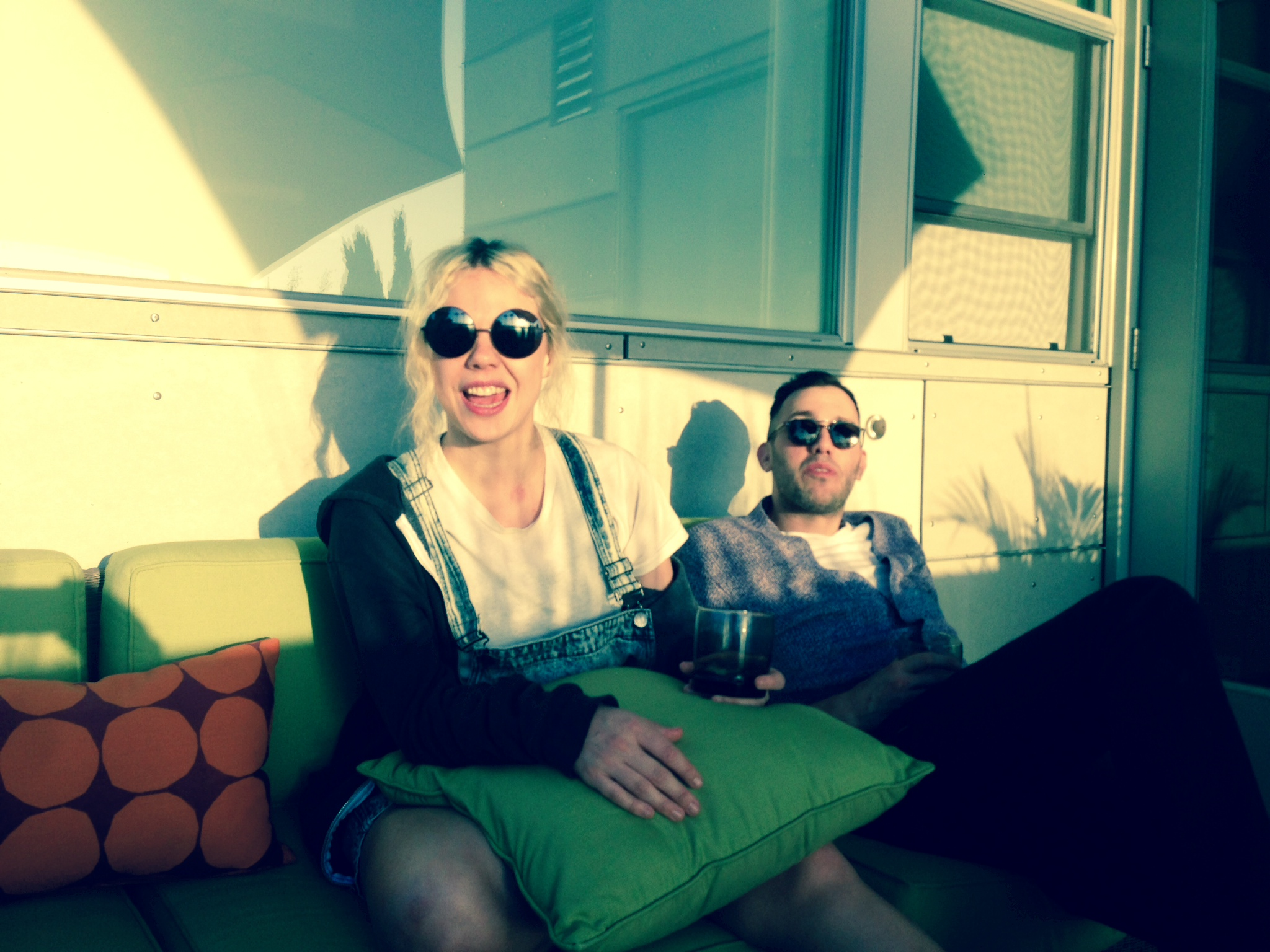
- MNDR and Peter Wade in Los Angeles, April 2013

Background information
- Born: Amanda Lucille Warner; September 12, 1982 (age 44); Fargo, North Dakota, U.S.
- Genres: Electropop; synth-pop; dance-pop
- Occupations: Singer; songwriter; record producer
- Instruments: Vocals; bass; keyboards; synthesizer
- Years active: 1998–present
- Labels: WonderSound; Ultra; Fool's Gold; Mom + Pop
- Website: www.mndr.com

Amanda Lucille Warner (born September 12, 1982), known professionally as MNDR, is an American singer, songwriter, and record producer. She rose to prominence after being featured on Mark Ronson & The Business Intl's 2010 single "Bang Bang Bang", which peaked at number six on the UK Singles Chart.

== Life and career ==
=== 1998–2006: Early life and career beginnings ===
Amanda Lucille Warner was born on September 12, 1982, in Fargo, North Dakota, where she was raised on a farm. Her father built a four-track reel-to-reel in the basement of the family's farmhouse, and when Warner was about nine or 10 years old, he taught her how to record on it. In 1998, when Warner transferred to Macalester College in Saint Paul, Minnesota, from Portland, Oregon, she met Brian Tester through Susan Lindell, a mutual friend, and the three formed the electronic pop band Triangle. A few months after the trio's self-titled four-track debut EP was released in 1999 on their own label, Smoke + Mirrors, Lindell left the band to join the touring musical Buddy: The Buddy Holly Story as a guitar technician.

As a duo, Triangle released a second EP titled Peek Meeter in 2000 on Smoke + Mirrors, and after signing to the Philadelphia-based label File 13 Records, they released their full-length debut album, *, on October 16, 2001. Warner graduated from Macalester College in 2001 with a minor in chemistry and a major in double bass. In 2006, Triangle released their second album, Decimal Places, through Chicago's Essay Records.

=== 2009–2010: E.P.E. and "Bang Bang Bang" ===
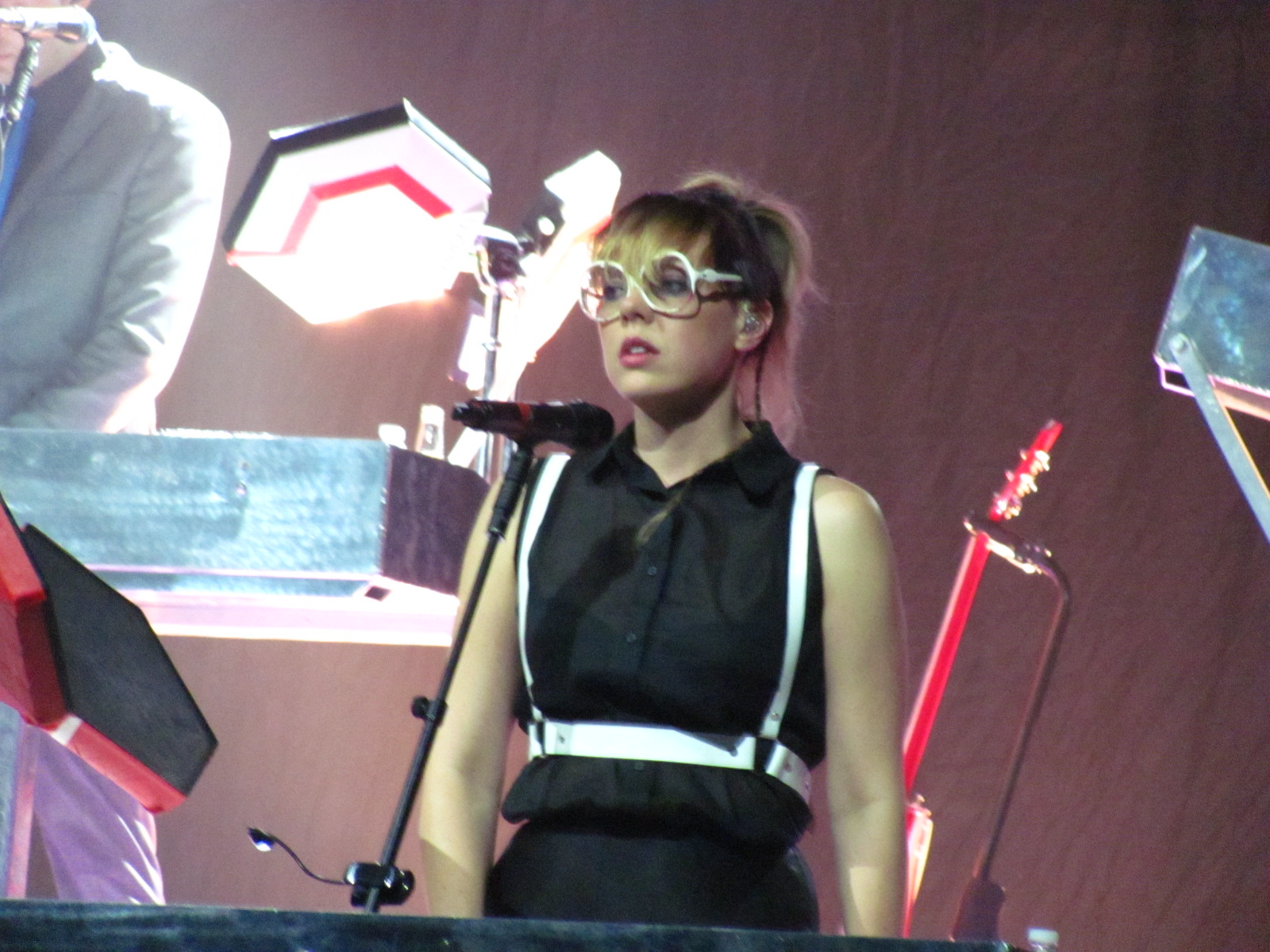
MNDR performing with Mark Ronson and Q-Tip at Webster Hall in New York City in October 2010

Warner relocated from Oakland, California, to New York City in mid-2009 to work as a songwriter for hire, after a publishing company scout offered her a deal to write songs for mainstream artists. She soon met producer Peter Wade, and after months of writing with him, he suggested that she release an album under her own name. At the time, Warner designed a touring keyboard rig and played bass for the Yeah Yeah Yeahs during the making of their album It's Blitz! (2009). MNDR has since opened for bands such as Yacht, Massive Attack, Deerhoof, Miike Snow, Chromeo, the Ting Tings, and Duran Duran, and frequently collaborates with visual artist Jamie Carreiro, who provides visual effects for her live shows. Warner and Wade uploaded four tracks to Myspace in 2009, which eventually became MNDR's debut EP, E.P.E., released on April 6, 2010, on Wade's WonderSound Records. The EP was preceded by MNDR's debut single, "C.L.U.B.", released on March 24, 2009.

Warner has performed under the moniker MNDR since 2005, around the time she was performing in the Bay Area. The name was given to her by a Fargo friend, who called her "Mandar" while she was still in high school. The spelling and design were inspired by early Detroit techno, early Chicago house, and German techno. Warner explained, "MNDR is a group with Peter Wade in the sense that we make and write all of the music. However, I perform as a solo artist and all that comes with that."

After hearing some of MNDR's music, English producer Mark Ronson invited Warner on his East Village Radio show in 2010, where he played one of her songs. Ronson asked if she would like to write on his third album, Record Collection (released under the moniker Mark Ronson & The Business Intl), resulting in what would become the album's lead single, "Bang Bang Bang", which features vocals by Warner and Q-Tip. Written by Warner, Wade, Ronson, and Q-Tip, the song was released on July 9, 2010, reaching number six on the UK Singles Chart.

MNDR performed "Bang Bang Bang" with Mark Ronson & The Business Intl and Q-Tip on several television shows, including Friday Night with Jonathan Ross on July 2, 2010, Later... with Jools Holland on September 17, Late Show with David Letterman on October 11, and Jimmy Kimmel Live! on October 14. She later joined Mark Ronson & The Business Intl and toured the US, Europe, and Australia for a year, while also touring as MNDR in her free time.

=== 2011–2013: Feed Me Diamonds ===
In October 2011, MNDR signed to Ultra Music. Her first single with the label, "#1 in Heaven", was released on January 17, 2012. MNDR told Spin magazine that the lyrics are inspired by kidnapped heiress Patty Hearst, commenting, "The lyrics to the chorus are her words [...] After she was arrested for robbing a bank where someone was murdered, her only press statement was, 'Tell them [my brothers and sisters] I am smiling and send my greetings.'" The accompanying music video was directed by Ssion lead singer Cody Critcheloe and takes inspiration from women such as Jane Fonda, Wendy O. Williams, and Valerie Solanas. In an interview with Coup De Main magazine in February 2012, MNDR revealed that her debut studio album was titled Feed Me Diamonds, adding that the title track is a homage to performance artist Marina Abramović.

"Faster Horses" was released on July 17, 2012, as the second single from Feed Me Diamonds. The song is inspired by the Henry Ford quote, "If I had asked people what they wanted, they would have said faster horses." The album was released on August 14, 2012, by Ultra Music, and was streamed in full on the Spin website the previous day. The title track was released on December 17, 2012, as the album's third single, and its music video stars drag queen and former RuPaul's Drag Race contestant Raven. On December 17, 2012, MNDR made a second appearance on Late Show with David Letterman, performing "Feed Me Diamonds". Feed Me Diamonds was named the eighth best pop album of 2012 by Spin.

=== 2014–present: Hell to Be You Baby ===
On June 16, 2014, MNDR announced via Twitter she was working on her second studio album. Later that year, MNDR co-wrote the song "Get a Little Closer", recorded by Rita Ora for the Adidas Originals #unstoppable campaign. She collaborated with the duo Sweet Valley for a five-track EP titled Dance 4 a Dollar, released on February 24, 2015, by Fool's Gold Records. MNDR described the EP as "the altered states parallel universe of East LA neighborhoods Highland Park and Eagle Rock. It is the soundtrack to nihilist future acid punk versions of these worlds, mixed with cough syrup and taking nods from Charles Burns' Black Hole, Akira, and Love and Rockets." On October 9, 2015, she released "Kimono", a teaser single for her then-untitled second album. The song was also featured in the promotional video for season 11 of the E! reality television series Keeping Up with the Kardashians.

On July 7, 2016, Duran Duran announced that MNDR would stand in for founding keyboardist Nick Rhodes during part of the third leg of the Paper Gods tour in the United States. Rhodes was quoted as saying, "I will be back as soon as I can but know, in the meantime, that I am leaving both the band and fans in great hands, with the fabulous MNDR." MNDR collaborated with Scissor Sisters on the charity single "Swerlk", released on June 9, 2017, in celebration of Pride Month and in honor of the one-year anniversary of the mass shootings at the Pulse nightclub in Orlando, Florida.

On September 12, 2019, MNDR released "Save Me", the first official single from her second studio album, Hell to Be You Baby. The album itself was released on June 25, 2021, by WonderSound Records.

== Personal life ==
On February 5, 2020, MNDR gave birth to a daughter.

== Discography ==
=== Studio albums ===
Title	Details
Feed Me Diamonds	Released: August 14, 2012; Label: Ultra; Formats: CD, LP, digital download
Hell to Be You Baby	Released: June 25, 2021; Label: WonderSound; Formats: Digital download, streaming

=== Extended plays ===
Title	Details
E.P.E.	Released: April 6, 2010; Label: WonderSound; Formats: CD, digital download
Dance 4 a Dollar (with Sweet Valley)	Released: February 24, 2015; Label: Fool's Gold; Formats: 10-inch vinyl, digital download

=== Singles ===
==== As lead artist ====
Title	Year	Album
"C.L.U.B."	2009	E.P.E.
"Caligula"	2010	Non-album singles
"Cut Me Out"	2011	Non-album singles
"#1 in Heaven"	2012	Feed Me Diamonds
"Faster Horses"	2012	Feed Me Diamonds
"Feed Me Diamonds"	2012	Feed Me Diamonds
"Kimono"	2015	Non-album singles
"Swerlk" (with Scissor Sisters)	2017	Non-album singles
"Gravity"	2018	Non-album singles
"Mars"	2019	Non-album singles
"Save Me"	2019	Hell to Be You Baby
"Open"	2020	Hell to Be You Baby
"Fragile"	2020	Hell to Be You Baby
"Save Yourself" (with Big Data)	2021	Non-album single
"Love in Reverse" (with Empress Of)	2021	Hell to Be You Baby
"Hell to Be You Baby"	2021	Hell to Be You Baby
"Dove" (with Choir Boy)	2021	Hell to Be You Baby
"Want"	2021	Hell to Be You Baby
"Cult of Me" (with Girli)	2021	Hell to Be You Baby

==== As featured artist ====
Title	Year	Peak chart positions							Certifications	Album
Title	Year	AUS	AUT	GER	IRE	NZ	SWI	UK	Certifications	Album
"Bang Bang Bang" (Mark Ronson & The Business Intl. featuring Q-Tip and MNDR)	2010	16	75	43	18	25	65	6	BPI: Silver; ARIA: Platinum; RMNZ: Gold	Record Collection
"Always on the Mind" (Psychobuildings featuring MNDR)	2012	—	—	—	—	—	—	—		Non-album single
"Go with It" (Tokimonsta featuring MNDR)	2013	—	—	—	—	—	—	—		Half Shadows
"Let Go" (RAC featuring Kele and MNDR)	2013	—	—	—	—	—	—	—		Strangers
"Like It's Over" (Jai Wolf featuring MNDR)	2016	—	—	—	—	—	—	—		Kindred Spirits
"Unusual" (RAC featuring MNDR)	2017	—	—	—	—	—	—	—		Ego
"We Love" (Tokimonsta featuring MNDR)	2017	—	—	—	—	—	—	—		Lune Rouge
"Chemicals" (Oliver featuring MNDR)	2017	—	—	—	—	—	—	—		Full Circle
"Shivers" (Slow Magic featuring MNDR)	2017	—	—	—	—	—	—	—		Float
"I Could Always" (Le Youth featuring MNDR)	2017	—	—	—	—	—	—	—		Non-album singles
"I Only Need One" (Bearson featuring MNDR)	2017	—	—	—	—	—	—	—		Non-album singles
"My Sex" (Brooke Candy featuring Pussy Riot, MNDR and Mykki Blanco)	2018	—	—	—	—	—	—	—		Non-album singles
"Ether" (RAC featuring MNDR)	2023	—	—	—	—	—	—	—		Single
"DISKO" (Upsilone featuring MNDR)	2024	—	—	—	—	—	—	—		Single
"Tower In The Woods" (What So Not featuring MNDR)	2024	—	—	—	—	—	—	—		Motions
"Slow Motion" (What So Not featuring MNDR)	2024	—	—	—	—	—	—	—		Motions
"After Midnight" (Martin Solveig featuring MNDR)	2023	—	—	—	—	—	—	—		Back to Life
"—" denotes a recording that did not chart or was not released in that territory.

=== Guest appearances ===
Title	Year	Other artist(s)	Album
"Record Collection 2012" (featuring MNDR, Pharrell, Wiley and Wretch 32)	2011	Mark Ronson	Kitsuné: Record Collection 2012 (Remixes) [feat. MNDR, Pharrell, Wiley & Wretch 32]
"Young & Restless"	2014	M-Flo	Future Is Wow
"Solid Gold"	2015	Michna	Thousand Thursday
"Run for Cover"	2015	None	Catch the Throne: The Mixtape Volume II
"Lock & Load"	2015	Killer Mike	Welcome to Los Santos
"Run"	2015	Nick Catchdubs	Smoke Machine
"No More Control"	2015	Murs	Have a Nice Life
"Born to Break"	2015	Robert DeLong	In the Cards
"We're Coming to You" (Jesse Shatkin Remix)	2016	The Bird and the Bee	Recreational Remixes
"Like Water"	2016	Flume	Skin
"Falling Back"	2017	Oliver	Full Circle
"Chemicals"	2017	Oliver	Full Circle
"Big Love" (with EARTHGANG & MNDR)	2020	Louis The Child	Here for Now

=== Remixes ===
Title	Year	Artist
"Pumped Up Kicks" (MNDR 4-Track Remix)	2011	Foster the People
"Spellwork" (MNDR Nighttime Remix)	2011	Austra
"Psy-Chic" (Chops and Screws MNDR Remix)	2012	Ssion
"Breathing Underwater" (MNDR Remix)	2013	Metric
"Keep On Dancing" (MNDR Remix)	2014	The Bloody Beetroots featuring Drop the Lime
"Forget" (MNDR Remix)	2014	Home Video
"I Want You" (MNDR Remix)	2015	Wrabel
"Nightlight" (MNDR Remix)	2018	Silversun Pickups

=== Production and songwriting credits ===
Title	Year	Artist(s)	Album	Credit	Ref.
"Chance"	2011	Silk Flowers	LTD. Form	Production	
"Frozen Moments"	2011	Silk Flowers	LTD. Form	Production	
"Covered Lamp"	2011	Silk Flowers	LTD. Form	Production	
"Fruit of the Vine"	2011	Silk Flowers	LTD. Form	Production	
"Small Fortune"	2011	Silk Flowers	LTD. Form	Production	
"Band of Color"	2011	Silk Flowers	LTD. Form	Production	
"Present Dreams"	2011	Silk Flowers	LTD. Form	Production	
"Thin Air"	2011	Silk Flowers	LTD. Form	Production	
"A Bush Through the Dust"	2011	Silk Flowers	LTD. Form	Production	
"You Can't Be Friends with Everyone"	2011	Make Out	Non-album singles	Production	
"You're So Party Tonight"	2012	Make Out	Non-album singles	Production	
"Kiss Kiss"	2013	Prince Royce	Soy el Mismo	Co-writing	
"Legacy"	2014	Sean Paul	Full Frequency	Co-writing	
"RYDEEN ~Dance All Night~"	2014	E-girls	Colorful Pop	Co-writing	
"Les Sex"	2014	Kylie Minogue	Kiss Me Once	Co-writing	
"Get a Little Closer"	2014	Rita Ora	Non-album song	Co-writing	
"Glow"	2014	Kylie Minogue and Fernando Garibay	Sleepwalker	Co-writing	
"Wait"	2014	Kylie Minogue and Fernando Garibay	Sleepwalker	Co-writing	
"Break This Heartbreak"	2014	Kylie Minogue and Fernando Garibay	Sleepwalker	Co-writing	
"Chasing Ghosts"	2014	Kylie Minogue and Fernando Garibay	Sleepwalker	Co-writing	
"Feel It"	2014	Dev	Bittersweet July	Co-writing	
"Gimmie Some"	2014	Dev	Bittersweet July Pt. 2	Co-writing	
"Never Gets Old"	2015	Penguin Prison	Lost in New York	Co-writing	
"Radio"	2015	Santigold	Paper Towns: Music From the Motion Picture	Co-writing	
"Tripolar"	2015	MS MR	How Does It Feel	Co-writing	
"L.A. Looks"	2015	Health	Death Magic	Co-writing	
"Rubber Band Stacks"	2015	Brooke Candy	Non-album single	Co-writing	
"If You Say So"	2015	Escort	Animal Nature	Co-writing	
"Something to Believe In"	2016	DJDS	Stand Up and Speak	Co-writing	
"Vroom Vroom"	2016	Charli XCX	Vroom Vroom	Co-writing	
"Trophy"	2016	Charli XCX	Vroom Vroom	Co-writing	
"Lonely Life"	2016	Miike Snow	iii	Co-writing	
All except "Love Song to the World"	2016	Clairy Browne	Pool	Co-writing	
All songs	2016	Clairy Browne	Pool	Executive production	
"Superhuman"	2016	Jake Miller	Overnight	Co-writing	
"Mean What I Mean"	2016	AlunaGeorge featuring Leikeli47 and Dreezy	I Remember	Co-writing	
"Hand in the Fire"	2016	Mr. Oizo featuring Charli XCX	All Wet	Co-writing	
"All Stars"	2017	Martin Solveig featuring Alma	All Stars	Co-writing	
"Come At Me"	2017	Dev	I Only See You When I'm Dreamin'	Co-writing	
"Express Pass"	2017	Taylor Parks	Tayla Made	Co-writing	
"Mood"	2017	Taylor Parks	Tayla Made	Co-writing	
"Hot Mess"	2017	Girli	Hot Mess	Co-writing	
"What I Like"	2017	Gia	What I Like	Co-writing	
"Babygirl"	2017	Charli XCX featuring Uffie	Number 1 Angel	Co-writing	
"Your Kiss Tastes Like Dope"	2017	Lawrence Rothman	The Book of Law	Co-writing	
"War"	2018	Brooke Candy	War	Co-writing, production	
"My Sex"	2018	Brooke Candy featuring Pussy Riot, MNDR, and Mykki Blanco	Non-album singles	Co-writing, co-production	
"My Love"	2018	Martin Solveig	Non-album singles	Co-writing	
"1980-99"	2018	Ssion featuring Patty Schemel and Sky Ferreira	O	Co-writing	
"Free Lunch (Break)"	2018	Ssion featuring Devendra Banhart	O	Co-writing	
"Heaven Is My Thing Again"	2018	Ssion featuring MNDR and Jametatone	O	Co-writing	
"Let Me Down Like U"	2018	Ssion featuring MNDR	O	Co-writing	
"Deal with It"	2019	Girli	Odd One Out	Executive production	
"Friday Night Big Screen"	2019	Girli	Odd One Out	Executive production	
"Hot Mess"	2019	Girli	Odd One Out	Executive production	
"Fake Friends"	2019	Girli	Odd One Out	Executive production	
"Young"	2019	Girli	Odd One Out	Executive production	
"Up & Down"	2019	Girli	Odd One Out	Executive production	
"Day Month Second"	2019	Girli	Odd One Out	Co-writing	
"Stick Out"	2019	Girli	Odd One Out	Co-writing	
"Pink"	2019	Girli	Odd One Out	Co-writing	
"Everything He Needs"	2019	Carly Rae Jepsen	Dedicated	Co-writing, bass	
"Big Love"	2020	Louis the Child featuring EarthGang	Here for Now	Co-writing	
"In A Spiral"	2020	Phantogram (band)	Ceremony	Co-writing	
"Pedestal"	2020	Phantogram (band)	Ceremony	Co-writing	
"Nicolas Cage"	2020	Kesha	Non-album singles	Co-writing	
"GO LIVE"	2020	Stray Kids	Go Live	Production	
"No Use"	2020	Christian Leave	Non-album singles	Production	
"Adult"	2020	Christian Leave	Non-album singles	Production	
"San Andreas Fault"	2021	Kathleen	Non-album singles	Production	
"Never Going Home"	2021	Kungs	Club Azur	Co-Writing	
"Lipstick"	2021	Kungs	Club Azur	Co-Writing	
"Clap Your Hands"	2022	Kungs	Club Azur	Co-Writing	
"Past Life"	2022	Madame Gandhi	Vibrations (EP)	Executive Production	
"Heart Wide Open"	2022	Madame Gandhi	Vibrations (EP)	Executive Production	
"Crystals and Congas"	2022	Madame Gandhi	Vibrations (EP)	Production, Executive Production	
"Date Me"	2022	Madame Gandhi	Vibrations (EP)	Production, Executive Production	
"Set Me Free"	2022	Madame Gandhi	Vibrations (EP)	Production, Executive Production	
"After Midnight"	2023	Martin Solveig	Back to Life	Co-writing	
"Ether"	2023	RAC	Single	Co-writing	
"Sour Like Lemonade"	2023	Ill Peach	This Is Not an Exit	Co-writing	
"Sigh"	2023	Ill Peach	This Is Not an Exit	Co-writing	
"BLAH BLAH BLAH"	2023	Ill Peach	Non-album single	Co-writing	
"Forever 21"	2024	Trashworld	Livin' In A Trashworld	Production, Writing	
"Dark Star Fairy"	2024	Trashworld	Livin' In A Trashworld	Production, Writing	
"F**K WORK"	2024	Trashworld	Livin' In A Trashworld	Production, Writing	
"Avoid"	2024	mra.	Avoid	Production, Writing	
"Worthy"	2024	Mavis Staples	Worthy	Production, Writing	
"DISKO"	2024	Upsilone	DISKO	Co-writing	
"Tower In The Woods"	2024	What So Not	Motions	Co-writing	
"Slow Motion"	2024	What So Not	Motions	Co-writing	
"Feedback Invisible"	2024	Phantogram	Memory of a Day	Co-writing	
"It Wasn't Meant To Be"	2024	Phantogram	Memory of a Day	Co-writing	
"Phuket"	2025	Soo Joo	No Ghost	Co-writing	
"Love Is An Ocean"	2025	The Midnight	Single	Co-writing	

=== Music videos ===
Title	Year	Director(s)
"Bang Bang Bang" (Mark Ronson & The Business Intl. featuring Q-Tip and MNDR)	2010	Warren Fu
"Cut Me Out"	2011	Timothy Saccenti
"C.L.U.B."	2012	fourclops
"#1 in Heaven"	2012	Cody Critcheloe
"Feed Me Diamonds"	2012	Peter LaBier
"Go with It" (Tokimonsta featuring MNDR)	2013	High5Collective
"Faster Horses"	2013	John Threat
"Hell to Be You Baby"	2021	MNDR and Glow in the Dirt

== Awards and nominations ==
Year	Award	Category	Nominated work	Result	Ref.
2011	MTV O Music Awards	Best Web-Born Artist	MNDR	Nominated	
2012	MTV O Music Awards	Beyond the DJ: Most Innovative Solo Performer	MNDR	Won	
2012	Paper Nightlife Awards	Best DJ	MNDR	Won	
2017	Grammy Award	Best Dance/Electronic Album	Skin (by Flume)	Won	
