= Clap Your Hands =

Clap Your Hands may refer to:

== Songs ==
- "Clap Yo' Hands", written by George and Ira Gershwin, 1926
- "Clap Your Hands", by the Beau-Marks, 1960
- "Clap Your Hands!", by the Manhattan Transfer, from The Manhattan Transfer, 1975
- "Clap Your Hands", by LL Cool J, from Walking with a Panther, 1989
- "Clap Your Hands", by A Tribe Called Quest, from Midnight Marauders, 1993
- "Clap Yo Hands", by Naughty by Nature, 1995
- "Clap Your Hands!", by the Black Eyed Peas, from Behind the Front, 1998
- "Clap Your Hands", by Camisra (Tall Paul), 1999
- "Clap Your Hands!", by Lil' Romeo, from Game Time, 2002
- "Clap Your Hands", by They Might Be Giants, from No!, 2002
- "Clap Your Hands", by Downsyde, from When the Dust Settles, 2004
- "Clap Your Hands!", by Audio Adrenaline, from Until My Heart Caves In, 2005
- "Clap Your Hands!", by Clap Your Hands Say Yeah, from Clap Your Hands Say Yeah, 2005
- "Clap Your Hands" (2NE1 song), 2010
- "Clap Your Hands" (Sia song), 2010
- "Clap Your Hands" (David Guetta and Glowinthedark song), 2015
- "Clap Your Hands", by Le Youth featuring Ava Max, 2017
- "Clap Your Hands" (Kungs song), 2022

== Other uses ==
- Clap Your Hands, a 1948 film in the Universal Pictures Sing and Be Happy series
- Clap Your Hands, a 1956 album by Roberta Sherwood

== See also ==
- Clapping, the sound made by striking together two flat surfaces, such as the palms of the hands
- Applause, the expression of approval by the act of hand clapping
- Clap Your Hands Say Yeah, an American indie rock band
