= Feed Me Diamonds =

2012 studio album by MNDR

Studio album by MNDR
- Released: August 14, 2012
- Studios: WonderSound, New York City
- Genres: Electropop; synth-pop; dance-pop
- Length: 44:25
- Label: Ultra
- Producers: Peter Wade; Patrik Berger

MNDR chronology
E.P.E. (2010)	Feed Me Diamonds (2012)	Hell to Be You Baby (2021)

Singles from Feed Me Diamonds
- 1. "#1 in Heaven" Released: January 17, 2012; 2. "Faster Horses" Released: July 17, 2012; 3. "Feed Me Diamonds" Released: December 17, 2012

Feed Me Diamonds is the debut studio album by American singer MNDR. It was released on August 14, 2012 through Ultra Records. It is an electropop, synth-pop and dance-pop album written and produced almost entirely by MNDR and collaborator Peter Wade, featuring songs discussing themes of society, politics and relationships. Three singles were released prior – "#1 in Heaven", "Faster Horses" and "Feed Me Diamonds".

== Background ==
Following the release of debut EP E.P.E. and a commercial breakthrough with Mark Ronson collaboration "Bang Bang Bang" in 2010, Amanda Warner had soon begun working on her debut album, rejecting multiple offers of collaboration. Work on it was said to be nearly finished by the beginning of January 2011, with an initial release date predicted for later that month. However, Feed Me Diamonds would end up delayed multiple times. First, until spring of that year. The next premiere date was set as summer (late July, early August) of 2012. By May 14, a final release date of August 14 was announced in a press release, alongside the record's title and track list.

The delays came as a result of Warner taking a long time to find a record label to sign with, denying ones who wanted to offer A&R services, believing she "didn't need to go through that process". Certain songs had been partially written for a year before the album's release. According to the artist, Feed Me Diamonds was crafted with the desire "to make an album that was timeless in sonics and writing".

== Composition ==
Feed Me Diamonds covers a range of "esoteric subjects" set to a backdrop of "mostly […] uptempo" electropop, synth-pop and dance-pop music which draws influences from many subgenres of EDM, among them acid house, Miami bass, electroclash and techno, as well as 1980s, European and industrial sounds and touches of dubstep. Across the album, Amanda Warner's vocal performances "[veer] between aerobic bounce and sang-froid remove".

Album opener "#1 in Heaven" was born out of Warner's obsession with Patty Hearst. Its sounds is defined by "squelchy, Johnny Jewel-like keyboard lines, seesawing, disorientating rhythms and celestial harmonies", with a "sky-scraping" chorus that quotes a well-known statement Hearst made following her 1975 arrest. The following track, "Stay", "follow[s] a similar progression" as its predecessor and discusses the desire to "be frozen in the good moments" of a relationship despite moving on from it. "Faster Horses" is a "euphoric floor-thumper" with a more prominent European techno sound. An "apocryphal" Henry Ford quote ("If the public asked me what to make, they'd ask me to make faster horses") served as a source of inspiration for the title and lyrics. It was born out of Warner's frustration with pressures to create radio-friendly music and "be something [she's] not". The next two tracks, "Blue Jean Youth" and "Fall in Love with the Enemy", focus on emotional topics. The former, on teenage obsessions, while the latter is about "sexuality and passion", "[being] taken advantage of and liking that". "Fall in Love with the Enemy", consisting of "brick-heavy horns" and "triple-time claps on the counter-rhythm", drew comparison to "prime Robyn". The sixth of twelve songs, titled "U.B.C.L.", is the longest. The "loopy club anthem", a rework of MNDR's first-ever single, "C.L.U.B.", is built on "tight bass with wonky synths and restless percussion".

The title track of Feed Me Diamonds is also its only ballad, one that discusses death and focuses on Warner's vocals, with a backing of "somber", "layered", "dramatic" and "sparse" production, featuring a "lonely bass pulse with lush pizzicato strings". It serves as an homage to Marina Abramović, who claimed that her father was murdered by being fed finely-ground diamonds. The album finishes with "I Go Away", which first appeared on E.P.E.. The "serious slow-dance pop confection" has "distinctive synths that melt all over a spare, echoing drum beat" that "[build] to [a] cathartic peak". Its topic is "post-relationship-fallout".

== Promotion ==
The lead single for the album was "#1 in Heaven". It was first made available to listen through a phone call to a specific number. A low-quality recording of it was uploaded to the internet soon after, and the song saw an official digital release on January 17, 2012. An accompanying music video was made – directed by Cody Critcheloe, a friend of Warner's, it is a "live action zine and manifesto being created in real time" using "different archival footage, animation, and film techniques" and inspired by "strong iconic women" such as Jane Fonda, Wendy O. Williams and Valerie Solanas.

"Faster Horses" first premiered on Pitchfork's website on July 10, with an official digital release following an exact week later.

"U.B.C.L." received a remix package. On top of that, a special video for it was released. Viewing it required fans to "log in to the MNDR website via Facebook to access a personalised interactive music video experience", which utilized fragments of the user's own Facebook history.

Certain plans revolving around singles and videos never came to fruition. In an interview with Abbey Braden for Virgin Mobile USA, Warner mentioned that "Sparrow Voices", then still called "Sparrows", was meant to be the second single. A music video for "Burning Hearts" was going to be released in April 2014. As revealed in an interview, it was recorded in an undisclosed public location where filming was not allowed and carried with it the risk of a lawsuit.

The album was promoted through live performances. Its title track received a "stripped-down" outing in December 2012 on the Late Show with David Letterman. As part of Billboard's Tastemakers series, she performed "Feed Me Diamonds", "Faster Horses" and "Fall in Love with the Enemy" at Mophonics Studio in Manhattan.

== Critical reception ==
Professional ratings
Aggregate scores
Source	Rating
Metacritic	62/100
Review scores
Source	Rating
Consequence	D−
Pitchfork	7.1
PopMatters	4/10
Rolling Stone	3.5/5 stars
Spin	8/10

On review aggregate website Metacritic, the album received a score of 62 out of 100 possible points based on six reviews, indicating "generally favorable" reception from music critics.

In her positive review for Spin, Julianne Escobedo Shepherd praised the blending of mainstream pop instincts with knowledge of electronic and dance music, as well as the "arena-ready sense of melody" displayed on Feed Me Diamonds. She described it as "first and foremost: a really ill techno record. It would later appear on the same publication's list of the 20 best pop albums of the year, at number 8. There, Maura Johnston complimented the fact that the "common trope" of "pain brought forth from beauty" was handled in a way that felt "cathartic, not sulky". She deemed this "a testament to MNDR's pop chops". Johnston also reviewed the album for Rolling Stone, where she rated it three and a half stars out of five. In her review, she described the album as a "sweaty workout that mixes chilly electro moves with the kind of joyous beats that soundtracked summertime in the 1980s". Katherine St. Asaph, for her Pitchfork review, summed Feed Me Diamonds up as "arresting, but […] pastiche". In her view, MNDR found greater success at covering emotional topics than sociopolitical ones. Despite these criticisms, though, the publication gave a rating of 7.1, with the review's final sentence proclaiming "MNDR always had style; here, at least, the substance has caught up".

A critique levelled against MNDR's debut by some critics was its perceived failure to distinguish itself from numerous contemporaries making synth-pop music in the same time period. Elias Leight wrote that despite an abundance of "easy hooks that you can't stop whistling", "the material doesn't connect with the proper force". His review for PopMatters focused on the songs' unfulfilled potential, which he partially attributed to Warner's limited vocal abilities. His final rating was a four out of ten. A similar sentiment was echoed by Consequence's Bryant Kitching. To him, musicians like Robyn, Lykke Li, La Roux or Charli XCX had delved into the same soundscape with better results than MNDR, who was "more than a few minor tweaks away from righting her runaway train". Wyatt Lawton-Masi of Tone Deaf expressed a mixed opinion about Feed Me Diamonds. It featured both "nice" and "one-dimensional" moments, according to him – "#1 in Heaven" and "U.B.C.L." being part of the former group, while "Faster Horses" and "Burning Hearts" belonging to the latter. He felt disappointed that the album is "a bit patchy", but showed hope that a sophomore album could "strengthen what they hint at here".

== Track listing ==
All tracks are written by Amanda Warner and Peter Wade Keusch, except where noted otherwise. All tracks produced by Peter Wade; "Fall in Love with the Enemy" by Wade and Patrik Berger.

1. "#1 in Heaven" – 3:50
2. "Stay" (Warner, Keusch, Peter LaBier, Juan Pieczanski) – 3:20
3. "Faster Horses" – 3:40
4. "Blue Jean Youth" – 2:55
5. "Fall in Love with the Enemy" (Warner, Keusch, Patrik Berger) – 3:50
6. "U.B.C.L." – 4:30
7. "Feed Me Diamonds" – 3:28
8. "Burning Hearts" – 4:01
9. "Sooner or Later" – 3:58
10. "Waiting" – 3:02
11. "Sparrow Voices" – 4:14
12. "I Go Away" – 3:37

Deluxe edition bonus tracks

13. "Draw the Curtains" – 4:21
14. "Bombs Away" (Warner, Keusch, Berger) – 3:00
15. "We Can Fall" – 3:56
16. "Chained to Change" – 3:43

Vinyl releases of the record feature a different track list, with only 10 songs. The first five follow the order of the standard edition, with "Sooner or Later" as track 6, "Feed Me Diamonds" as 7, "Draw the Curtains" as 8, "Burning Hearts" as 9 and "I Go Away" as the final, 10th track.

== Personnel ==
Credits adapted from the booklet of the album's CD deluxe edition and a page on WonderSound Records' website.

- Amanda Warner – lead vocals, background vocals, songwriting, programming (on "U.B.C.L.", "Feed Me Diamonds", "Burning Hearts", "Sparrow Voices"), synthesizers, executive producer
- Peter Wade Keusch – songwriting, production, programming, recording engineer, executive producer
- Emmett Farley – recording engineer, digital editing, assistant engineering, mixing (on "Waiting")
- Patrik Berger – songwriting (on "Fall in Love with the Enemy"), production (on "Fall in Love with the Enemy"), programming (on "Fall in Love with the Enemy"), additional synthesizers (on "Fall in Love with the Enemy")
- Tony Maserati – mixing, additional mixing (on "Feed Me Diamonds")
- Peter LaBier – songwriting, additional synthesizers (on "Stay")
- Juan Pieczanski – songwriting, additional synthesizers (on "Stay" and "Burning Hearts")
- Dave Kutch – mastering
- Justin Hergett – mix prep (on "Faster Horses", "Sooner or Later", "I Go Away" and "Chained to Change"), additional mixing (on "Faster Horses", "Sooner or Later", "I Go Away" and "Chained to Change"), assistant engineering
- Chris Tabron – mix prep (on "#1 in Heaven", "Burning Hearts" and "Draw the Curtains"), additional mixing (on "#1 in Heaven", "Burning Hearts" and "Draw the Curtains"), assistant engineering
- Jonathan Castelli – mixing (on "Feed Me Diamonds"), mix prep (on "Stay", "Blue Jean Youth", "U.B.C.L." and "Bombs Away"), additional mixing (on "Stay", "Blue Jean Youth", "U.B.C.L." and "Bombs Away")
- Gabriel Rattiner – assistant engineer
- Nick Babian – assistant engineering
- Ivan Lys-Dobradin – assistant engineering
- Xander Points-Zollo – assistant engineering
- Marten Cardona – assistant engineering
- James Krausse – assistant engineering
- Rich Rich – assistant engineering
- Chris Sclafani – assistant engineering
- Anthony Rossomando – guitar (on "Waiting")
- Cody Critcheloe – cover art (CD and digital editions)
- Mike Reddy – cover art (vinyl edition), packaging design
- David Sonenberg – management
- Beth Narducci – management
