= Sesser =

Sesser may refer to:

- Sesser (grape), a Romanian/Moldovan wine grape variety that is also known as Băbească neagră
- Sesser, Illinois
- Kanya Sesser (born 1992), American para-athlete
