= My Love (Martin Solveig song) =

Single by Martin Solveig
- Released: 29 June 2018
- Genre: Deep house
- Length: 3:15
- Label: Virgin EMI
- Songwriter(s): Martin Picandet; Amanda Warner; Peter Wade; Amy Kuney
- Producer(s): Martin Solveig; Eric Chedeville

Martin Solveig singles chronology
| "All Stars" (2017) | "My Love" (2018) | "All Day and Night" (2019) |

"My Love" is a song by French DJ and record producer Martin Solveig. The song was released on 29 June 2018 by Virgin EMI Records. Martin Solveig used his own voice for the track The song was written by Martin Picandet, Amanda Warner, Peter Wade and Amy Kuney and produced by Martin Solveig and Eric Chedeville.

== Music video ==
A music video to accompany the release of "My Love" was first released onto YouTube on 29 June 2018 at a total length of three minutes and eighteen seconds.

== Track listing ==
Digital download
| No. | Title | Length |
|---|---|---|
| 1. | "My Love" | 3:15 |

Digital download
| No. | Title | Length |
|---|---|---|
| 1. | "My Love" (Extended) | 5:25 |
| 2. | "My Love" | 3:15 |

Digital download
| No. | Title | Length |
|---|---|---|
| 1. | "My Love" (Dillon Francis Remix) | 3:17 |

Digital download
| No. | Title | Length |
|---|---|---|
| 1. | "My Love" (WEISS Remix) | 4:03 |

Digital download
| No. | Title | Length |
|---|---|---|
| 1. | "My Love" (Kölsch Remix) | 9:12 |

Digital download
| No. | Title | Length |
|---|---|---|
| 1. | "My Love" (GUZ Remix) | 4:34 |
| 2. | "My Love" (eSQUIRE Remix) | 6:08 |
| 3. | "My Love" (Creange Remix) | 7:18 |
| 4. | "My Love" (Aazar Remix) | 3:06 |

== Charts ==
| Chart (2018) | Peak position |
|---|---|
| Belgium (Ultratip Bubbling Under Flanders) | 2 |
| France (SNEP) | 135 |
| Belgium (Ultratop 50 Wallonia) | 22 |

== Release history ==
| Region | Date | Format | Label |
|---|---|---|---|
| France | 19 June 2018 | Digital download | Virgin EMI |
