= Swerlk =

Single by MNDR and Scissor Sisters
- Released: June 9, 2017
- Genre: Synth-pop; nu-disco
- Length: 5:14
- Label: WonderSound
- Songwriters: Amanda Warner; Scott Hoffman; Peter Wade Keusch; Jason Sellards; Ana Lynch; Derek Gruen
- Producer: Peter Wade Keusch

MNDR singles chronology
"Like It's Over" (2016)	"Swerlk" (2017)	"Unusual" (2017)

Scissor Sisters singles chronology
"Let's Have a Kiki" (2012)	"Swerlk" (2017)

"Swerlk" is a song by American electronic singer MNDR and American pop band Scissor Sisters. It was released as a single on June 9, 2017, by WonderSound Records. MNDR and Scissor Sisters conceived the song in honor of the one-year remembrance of the 2016 Orlando nightclub shooting. "Swerlk" was released in conjunction with GLAAD and proceeds from the sales benefited the Contigo Fund, a non-profit organization for LGBTQ individuals. The website swerlk.com was developed to funnel donations directly to Contigo.

"Swerlk" marked the first single in five years by Scissor Sisters after they went on indefinite hiatus in 2012.

== Writing and development ==
"Swerlk" was written by MNDR along with Babydaddy, Jake Shears, Ana Matronic, and Del Marquis from Scissor Sisters. It was produced by MNDR's longtime collaborator Peter Wade Keusch, who also co-wrote and engineered the song. Chris Tabron mixed the song at Rumours Studios in New York City, and was assisted by Peter Geiser. The track was mastered by Dave Kutch at The Mastering Palace in New York. In an interview with iHeartRadio, MNDR explained that the song is about "celebrating life, dancing, individuality, differences, fierceness, and sometimes 'Swerlk' is even a shoulder to cry on". She further said that it "is not only a dance floor anthem, but it is a way of life, a mindset, and a show of solidarity." MNDR conceived the song in honor of the one-year anniversary of the 2016 Orlando nightclub shooting. Its title is a combination of the words "twerk", "twirl", "werk", "swerve" and "swirl".

"Swerlk" marked the first single in five years by Scissor Sisters after they went on indefinite hiatus in 2012. Babydaddy explained that when MNDR approached the band about the song, they all agreed that "it was too important to refuse". After contacting Elton John AIDS Foundation for guidance, the band decided to work with the Contigo Fund, which offers financial support to organizations working within the communities affected by the Orlando shooting. The project was later joined by GLAAD as an additional partner, which was "excited to be able to add an uplifting and fun message to what is also such a serious time for our community".

== Release ==
"Swerlk" was announced as a charity single during the Pride Month of June, in view of the one-year anniversary of the 2016 Orlando nightclub shooting. It was released on June 9, 2017, through WonderSound Records on iTunes, Spotify, Apple Music, Amazon, and Google Play. All sales and streaming sales of the song are donated to the Contigo Fund. On June 9, 2017, WonderSound also launched the site Swerlk.com, where listeners can receive a free download of the song by donating any amount of money. On the same day, a lyric video for the song premiered on Vevo. Commenting the release, Rich Ferraro from GLAAD stated, "Music has the power to uplift and unite people and the Scissor Sisters and MNDR have always done that for the LGBTQ community. 'Swerlk' is a perfect rallying cry to live your life authentically and proudly."

On June 15, 2017, an instructional dance video for the song premiered on Out magazine's website. It was directed by Kevin Tachman and Drew Levin, with a choreography by Brad Landers, who previously worked with Scissor Sisters on the music video for "Let's Have a Kiki" (2012). It features three dancers performing a dance routine named "Swerlk" in a classic how-to format.

== Critical reception ==
Justin Moran from Out magazine found the song a "proud declaration of queer power, choosing to remember the Pulse victims in a celebratory light on the shooting's one-year anniversary". Taylor Henderson from Pride named the song "a heart-pounding, house-beat anthem begging you to swirl it, twirl it, twerk it, swerve all the way to the dancefloor". Samantha Manzella from NewNowNext described the song as "an EDM anthem for the ages, packing dance-worthy beats and catchy lyrics into an infectious 5-minute jam". Will Stroude of Attitude called it a "thumping new anthem".

== Track listing ==
- Digital download
1. "Swerlk" – 5:14

== Credits and personnel ==
- Babydaddy – vocals, songwriter
- Caryn Ganz – additional vocals
- Peter Geiser – mixing assistant
- Peter Wade Keusch – additional vocals, producer, audio engineering
- Dave Kutch – audio mastering
- Del Marquis – electric guitar, songwriter
- Ana Matronic – vocals, songwriter
- Andrew Miller – additional digital editing
- MNDR – vocals, songwriter
- Mike Reddy – graphic design
- Jake Shears – vocals, songwriter
- Chris Tabron – mix engineering

Credits and personnel adapted from WonderSound listing.
