= Substitution (Purple Disco Machine and Kungs song) =

2023 single by Purple Disco Machine and Kungs

Single by Purple Disco Machine and Kungs featuring Julian Perretta

from the album Paradise
- Released: 30 March 2023
- Recorded: 2023
- Genre: Disco; Italo-disco; tropical house
- Length: 3:01
- Label: Columbia; Sony Music Germany; GmbH/Val; Def Jam; Universal Music France
- Songwriters: Dag Lundberg; Joacim Persson; Tino Piontek; Valentin Brunel; Julian Perretta
- Producers: Purple Disco Machine; Kungs

Purple Disco Machine singles chronology
"Summer Lovin'" (2022)	"Substitution" (2023)	"Bad Company" (2023)

Kungs singles chronology
"Clap Your Hands" (2022)	"Substitution" (2023)	"Shadows" (2023)

Julian Perretta singles chronology
"Home" (2022)	"Substitution" (2023)

Music video
- "Substitution" on YouTube

"Substitution" is a song by German DJ and record producer Purple Disco Machine and French DJ and record producer Kungs featuring English singer Julian Perretta. It was released on 30 March 2023 through Columbia, Sony Music Germany, GmbH/Val, Def Jam and Universal Music France. The song samples "Big In Japan" by Alphaville.

== Music video ==
The music video for "Substitution" was released on 30 March 2023 on both Piontek's and Kungs' YouTube channels. Piontek and Kungs appear in the video.

== Charts ==
=== Weekly charts ===
Weekly chart performance for "Substitution"
Chart (2023)	Peak position
Austria (Ö3 Austria Top 40)	18
Belarus Airplay (TopHit)	1
Belgium (Ultratop 50 Flanders)	2
Belgium (Ultratop 50 Wallonia)	2
Bulgaria Airplay (PROPHON)	1
CIS Airplay (TopHit)	1
Czech Republic Airplay (ČNS IFPI)	3
Estonia Airplay (TopHit)	6
Finland Airplay (Suomen virallinen lista)	17
France (SNEP)	6
Germany (GfK)	8
Global Excl. US (Billboard)	170
Hungary (Dance Top 40)	1
Hungary (Rádiós Top 40)	1
Hungary (Single Top 40)	7
Italy (FIMI)	47
Kazakhstan Airplay (TopHit)	3
Latvia Airplay (LAIPA)	1
Lithuania Airplay (TopHit)	6
Luxembourg (Billboard)	17
Moldova Airplay (TopHit)	22
Netherlands (Dutch Top 40)	5
Netherlands (Single Top 100)	1
Poland (Polish Airplay Top 100)	3
Poland (Polish Streaming Top 100)	10
Romania (Romanian Radio Airplay)	6
Russia Airplay (TopHit)	1
San Marino (SMRRTV Top 50)	7
Slovakia Airplay (ČNS IFPI)	4
Slovakia Singles Digital (ČNS IFPI)	4
Switzerland (Schweizer Hitparade)	9
Turkey International Airplay (Radiomonitor Türkiye)	4
Ukraine Airplay (TopHit)	20
US Hot Dance/Electronic Songs (Billboard)	42

=== Monthly charts ===
Monthly chart performance for "Substitution"
Chart (2023)	Peak position
Belarus Airplay (TopHit)	1
CIS Airplay (TopHit)	1
Czech Republic (Rádio Top 100)	4
Estonia Airplay (TopHit)	8
Kazakhstan Airplay (TopHit)	4
Latvia Airplay (TopHit)	12
Lithuania Airplay (TopHit)	5
Moldova Airplay (TopHit)	29
Romania Airplay (TopHit)	28
Russia Airplay (TopHit)	2
Slovakia (Rádio Top 100)	8
Slovakia (Singles Digitál Top 100)	54
Ukraine Airplay (TopHit)	24

=== Year-end charts ===
Year-end chart performance for "Substitution"
Chart (2023)	Position
Austria (Ö3 Austria Top 40)	40
Belarus Airplay (TopHit)	10
Belgium (Ultratop 50 Flanders)	11
Belgium (Ultratop 50 Wallonia)	5
Bulgaria Airplay (PROPHON)	9
CIS Airplay (TopHit)	4
Estonia Airplay (TopHit)	30
Germany (Official German Charts)	32
Hungary (Dance Top 40)	16
Hungary (Rádiós Top 40)	11
Kazakhstan Airplay (TopHit)	7
Latvia Airplay (TopHit)	24
Lithuania Airplay (TopHit)	13
Netherlands (Dutch Top 40)	32
Netherlands (Single Top 100)	69
Poland (Polish Airplay Top 100)	9
Poland (Polish Streaming Top 100)	40
Romania Airplay (TopHit)	45
Russia Airplay (TopHit)	5
Switzerland (Schweizer Hitparade)	79
Ukraine Airplay (TopHit)	131

2024 year-end chart performance for "Substitution"
Chart (2024)	Position
Belarus Airplay (TopHit)	40
CIS Airplay (TopHit)	73
Hungary (Dance Top 40)	2
Hungary (Rádiós Top 40)	12
Kazakhstan Airplay (TopHit)	84

2025 year-end chart performance for "Substitution"
Chart (2025)	Position
Belarus Airplay (TopHit)	41
CIS Airplay (TopHit)	130
Hungary (Dance Top 40)	17
Hungary (Rádiós Top 40)	79
Moldova Airplay (TopHit)	147
Poland (Polish Airplay Top 100)	75

== Certifications ==
Certifications for "Substitution"
Region	Certification	Certified units/sales
Austria (IFPI Austria)	Platinum	30,000^{‡}
Belgium (BRMA)	Platinum	40,000^{‡}
France (SNEP)	Diamond	333,333^{‡}
Germany (BVMI)	Gold	300,000^{‡}
Hungary (MAHASZ)	6× Platinum	24,000^{‡}
Italy (FIMI)	Platinum	100,000^{‡}
Poland (ZPAV)	3× Platinum	150,000^{‡}
Switzerland (IFPI Switzerland)	Platinum	20,000^{‡}
Streaming
Greece (IFPI Greece)	Gold	1,000,000^{†}
^{‡} Sales+streaming figures based on certification alone.^{†} Streaming-only figures based on certification alone.

== Release history ==
Release history and formats for "Substitution"
Region	Date	Format	Label(s)
Various	30 March 2023	Digital download; streaming	Columbia; Sony Music Germany; GmbH/Val; Def Jam; Universal Music France
