= All Stars (song) =

Single by Martin Solveig featuring Alma
- Released: 16 June 2017
- Genre: Future house
- Length: 2:50
- Label: Virgin EMI
- Songwriters: Amanda Warner; Peter Wade; Martin Picandet
- Producer: Martin Solveig

Martin Solveig singles chronology
"Places" (2016)	"All Stars" (2017)	"My Love" (2018)

Alma singles chronology
"Don't You Feel It" (2017)	"All Stars" (2017)	"Phases" (2017)

"All Stars" is a song by French DJ and record producer Martin Solveig, featuring vocals from Finnish singer-songwriter Alma. The song was released in France as a digital download on 16 June 2017 by Virgin EMI Records. The song was written by Amanda Warner, Peter Wade and Martin Picandet. The track premiered on 16 June 2017 as BBC Radio 1 DJ Annie Mac's "Hottest Record in the World". The song has peaked at number 11 on the French Singles Chart.

== Music video ==
A music video to accompany the release of "All Stars" was first released onto YouTube on 11 July 2017 at a total length of two minutes and fifty-six seconds.

== Track listing ==
Digital download
No.	Title	Length
1.	"All Stars" (featuring Alma)	2:50

== Charts ==
=== Weekly charts ===
Chart (2017–18)	Peak position
Austria (Ö3 Austria Top 40)	24
Belgium (Ultratop 50 Flanders)	11
Belgium (Ultratop 50 Wallonia)	4
Croatia (HRT)	99
Czech Republic Airplay (ČNS IFPI)	20
France (SNEP)	11
Germany (GfK)	33
Hungary (Dance Top 40)	31
Hungary (Rádiós Top 40)	8
Poland Airplay (ZPAV)	7
Poland Dance (ZPAV)	5
Scotland Singles (OCC)	69
Slovakia Airplay (ČNS IFPI)	68
Slovenia (SloTop50)	26
Switzerland (Schweizer Hitparade)	94
UK Singles (OCC)	83
US Hot Dance/Electronic Songs (Billboard)	40

=== Year-end charts ===
Chart (2017)	Position
Belgium (Ultratop Flanders)	67
Belgium (Ultratop Wallonia)	58
Belgium Dance (Ultratop Flanders)	6
France (SNEP)	97
Poland (ZPAV)	79
Chart (2018)	Position
Belgium (Ultratop Flanders)	84
Belgium Dance (Ultratop Flanders)	49
Hungary (Rádiós Top 40)	28
Chart (2019)	Position
Hungary (Rádiós Top 40)	34

== Certifications ==
Region	Certification	Certified units/sales
Belgium (BRMA)	Gold	10,000^{‡}
France (SNEP)	Diamond	333,333^{‡}
Germany (BVMI)	Gold	200,000^{‡}
Italy (FIMI)	Gold	25,000^{‡}
United Kingdom (BPI)	Silver	200,000^{‡}
^{‡} Sales+streaming figures based on certification alone.

== Release history ==
Region	Date	Format	Label
France	16 June 2017	Digital download	Virgin EMI
