= Peter Wade Keusch =

Record producer

Peter Wade
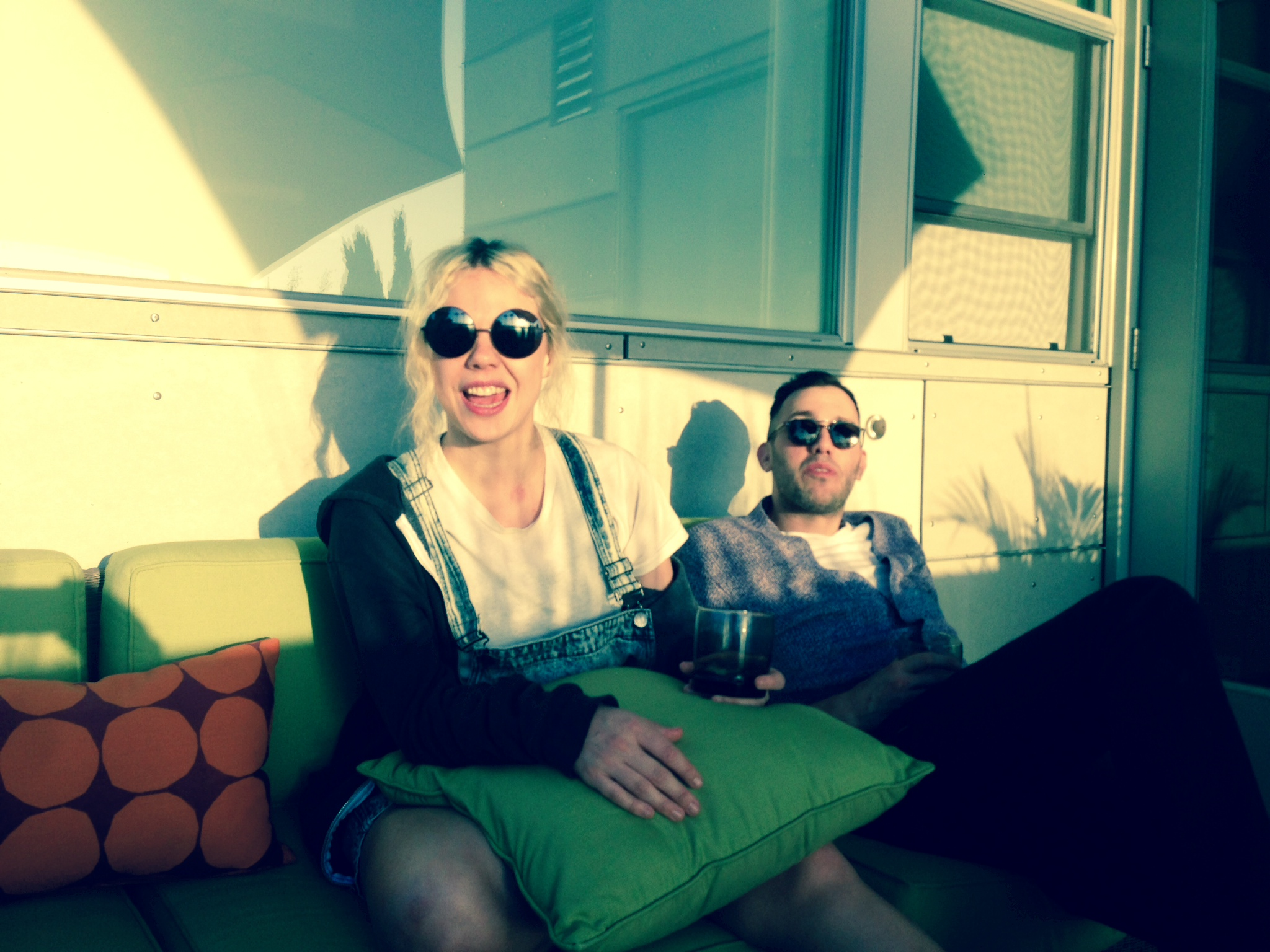
- Wade (right) in 2013
- Website: http://peter-wade.com, http://wondersoundrecords.com, http://120music.com

Peter Wade Keusch is an American record producer, recording engineer, mixer, songwriter and A&R. His artist development projects include MNDR, Party Nails, his record label WonderSound, and publishing company 120 Music. Wade's production and songwriting credits include Kid Ink, Jennifer Lopez, Martin Solveig, Kylie Minogue, and Flume.

Wade has contributed to two Latin Grammy Award-winning albums for Marc Anthony, and participated on Valio La Pena. He has been a guest speaker at the ASCAP Paul Cunningham Songwriter Workshop and The Grammy Professional Development Series. In 2008 he was published in Bruce Swedien's second book, In The Studio With Michael Jackson, and also contributed photography to Swedien's first book Make Mine Music.

Wade owns and operates a record label, WonderSound, and a music publishing company, 120 Music.

== Selected discography ==
- RAC - "Unusual feat. MNDR" (2017) Writer, Vocal Producer
- Martin Solveig feat. Alma - "All Stars" (2017) Writer
- MNDR & Scissor Sisters - "SWERLK" (2017) Producer, Composer
- Charli XCX - "Babygirl feat. Uffie" (2017) - Writer
- Flume - "Like Water feat. MNDR" (2016) Vocal Producer, Writer - GRAMMY WINNER
- Jai Wolf - "Like It's Over feat. MNDR" (2016) Writer, Vocal Producer
- Brooke Candy - "Rubber Band Stacks" Single (2015) Vocal Producer, Writer
- Sweet Valley - "Dance 4 a Dollar" EP (2015) Vocal Producer, Writer
- Penguin Prison - "Never Gets Old" (2015) Producer, Composer
- Kid Ink - "POV" (2015) Producer, Composer
- E! Fashion Police - Theme Music (2015) Producer, Composer
- Michna - "Solid Gold feat. MNDR" (2015) Vocal Producer, Writer
- Kylie Minogue - "Wait" (2014) Writer
- Little Boots - "Heroine" (2014) Producer, Writer, Engineer
- Dev - "Gimmie Some" (2014) Writer
- Spragga Benz - "Pop It Off" & "Pop It Off REMIX (feat. Smoke DZA & Sierra Leone)" (2014) Producer, Mixer, Engineer, Writer
- Spragga Benz - "Nothin' But Love (Feat. Black Pearl)" (2014) Producer, Mixer, Engineer
- Dev - "Feel It" (2014) Writer
- Kylie Minogue - "Les Sex" (2014) Vocal Producer, Writer
- Sean Paul - "Legacy" (2014) Writer
- LIZ - "Turn Around" (2014) Writer
- RAC - "Let Go (feat. MNDR)" - (2013) (single) Writer, Vocal Producer
- Tokimonsta - "Go With It (feat. MNDR)" - (2013) (single) Writer, Vocal Producer
- Seasick Mama - "Man Overboard", "Gimme Something More" (2013) Producer, Writer, Engineer
- MNDR - "Feed Me Diamonds" (album) (2012) Producer, Writer, Engineer, Artist
- Psychobuildings - "Hearts" (EP) (2012) Producer, Writer, Engineer, Mixer
- Make Out - "You Can't Be Friends With Everyone", "You're So Party Tonight" (2011) Producer, Engineer, Mixer
- Mark Ronson & The Business Intl. - "Bang Bang Bang feat. MNDR and Q-Tip" (2010) Producer, Writer, Engineer
- Melanie Fiona - "Monday Morning" (2009) Producer, Writer, Engineer
- 88-keys - "The Friends Zone" and "Morning Wood" (2008) Producer, Writer, Engineer
- Taylor Dayne - "She Doesn't Love You", "Dedicated" (2008) Producer, Writer, Engineer, Mixer
- Jennifer Lopez - "Never Gonna Give Up", "The Way It Is", "Be Mine", "I Need Love", "Frozen Moments", "Heart & Soul", "Get On The Mic" (2007) Producer, Writer, Engineer
- Shitake Monkey - "Street Beef" (album) (2007) Producer, Writer, Mixer, Engineer, Artist
- Natasha Bedingfield - "The One That Got Away" (2005) Producer, Mixer
- Lindsay Lohan - "Rumors" (2004) Producer, Mixer
- Spragga Benz - "Y" aka "Why" feat. Carly Simon (2003) Producer, Mixer, Engineer
- Marc Anthony - "Libre", "Mended", "Valio La Pena", "Amar Sin Mentiras", "El Cantante" (2003 - 2008) Engineer

=== Remixes ===
- Home Video - "Forget (MNDR Remix)" - 2014
- Living Days - "Thrill Anybody (MNDR Remix)" - 2014
- The Bloody Beetroots - "Keep On Dancing feat. Drop The Lime (MNDR Remix)" - 2014
- Safety Scissors - "Gemini (MNDR & Peter Wade Remix)" - 2014
- Conway - "Big Talk (Peter Wade of MNDR Remix) - 2013
- Mavado - "Cheat On Me (feat. Spice) (WonderSound Remix)" - 2013
- Metric - "Breathing Underwater (MNDR Remix)" - 2013
- MNDR - "Feed Me Diamonds (Peter Wade Remix)" -2013
- TV Mania - "Beautiful Clothes (Peter Wade MNDR Remix)" - 2013
- French Horn Rebellion vs. Database - "Poster Girl (Peter Wade Remix)" - 2013
- Childish Gambino - "Heartbeat (Peter Wade Remix)" - 2012
- Foster the People - "Pumped Up Kicks (MNDR 4-Track Remix)" - 2011
- Willie Colón - "La Murga (MNDR Whole Step Remix)" - 2011
- Austra - "Spellwork (MNDR Nighttime Remix)" - 2011
- Freelance Whales - "Hannah (Peter Wade of MNDR Remix)" - 2010
- Revl9n - "Waiting For Desire (Sizzler's - Surf N' Turf Version)" - 2008
- Yoko Ono - "O'Oh (with Shitake Monkey)" - 2007
- Jennifer Lopez - "Play feat. Slick Rick (Sack International Remix)" - 2002
