= Clap Your Hands (Kungs song) =

2022 single by Kungs

Single by Kungs

from the album Club Azur
- Released: 18 February 2022
- Recorded: 2021–2022
- Genre: House
- Length: 3:09
- Label: Val; Def Jam
- Songwriter(s): Valentin Brunel; Alexander Ridha; Amanda Warner; Peter Wade; Alfredo "Larry" Pignagnoli; Ivana Spagna; Ottavio Bacciocchi; Andrew Jackson; Thomas Mann
- Producer(s): Kungs; Boys Noize

Kungs singles chronology
"Lipstick" (2021)	"Clap Your Hands" (2022)	"Substitution" (2023)

Music video
- "Clap Your Hands" on YouTube

"Clap Your Hands" is a song by French DJ and record producer Kungs. It was released on 18 February 2022 through Val Productions and The Island Def Jam Music Group. It is a reworking of the 1983 hit single "Happy Song" by Italian band Baby's Gang.

== Charts ==
=== Weekly charts ===
Weekly chart performance for "Clap Your Hands"
Chart (2022–2023)	Peak position
Belgium (Ultratop 50 Wallonia)	4
France (SNEP)	19
Hungary (Dance Top 40)	7
Hungary (Rádiós Top 40)	26
Hungary (Single Top 40)	9
Italy (FIMI)	22
Poland (Polish Airplay Top 100)	29
San Marino (SMRRTV Top 50)	4

=== Year-end charts ===
2022 year-end chart performance for "Clap Your Hands"
Chart (2022)	Position
Belgium (Ultratop Wallonia)	20
France (SNEP)	47
Hungary (Dance Top 40)	25
Hungary (Rádiós Top 40)	79
Hungary (Single Top 40)	63

2023 year-end chart performance for "Clap Your Hands"
Chart (2023)	Position
Hungary (Dance Top 40)	10

2024 year-end chart performance for "Clap Your Hands"
Chart (2024)	Position
Hungary (Dance Top 40)	38

== Certifications ==
Certifications for "Clap Your Hands"
Region	Certification	Certified units/sales
France (SNEP)	Diamond	333,333^{‡}
Italy (FIMI)	2× Platinum	200,000^{‡}
Poland (ZPAV)	Platinum	50,000^{‡}
^{‡} Sales+streaming figures based on certification alone.

== Release history ==
Release history and formats for "Substitution"
Region	Date	Format	Label(s)
Various	18 February 2022	Digital download; streaming	GmbH/Val; Def Jam
