= Anetha =

French DJ and producer

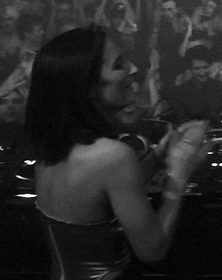

Background information
- Born: 1989; Bordeaux, France
- Genres: Electronic; Techno
- Occupation(s): DJ, record producer
- Years active: 2013–present

Anetha (born 1989) is a French techno DJ and producer.

== Biography ==
Born in 1989 in Bordeaux, Anetha has been mixing since the age of 16, introduced to techno music by her father, a Kraftwerk fan and amateur DJ. Without classical musical training, she graduated in architecture.

She began her career as a professional DJ in 2013, during a stay of a few months in London where she mixed in clubs such as Corsica Studios. She recorded her first sessions there in the studio of her roommates, sound engineers. Back in France, she set up her own studio in her Parisian apartment.

A resident of the evenings organized by the Blocaus collective in emblematic places of the capital, she played from 2014 in notorious venues in Paris, such as Concrete, the Machine du Moulin Rouge or Rex Club. She began performing abroad in 2015 at Bassiani in Tbilisi, De School in Amsterdam, Village Underground in London, Fuse in Brussels, 2.35:1 Berns in Stockholm, About :Blank in Berlin, then in 2017 in Tokyo and at the legendary Berghain in Berlin. Her song Acid Train, released in 2017, earned her a place in a list of the twenty best techno songs of the decade by Mix magazine. In Amsterdam in 2018, her set as part of Boiler Room was classified as one of the best in the techno genre of the year by the project.

Anetha is an example of a talented producer evolving in the world of electronic music and according to Le Point a “rising techno star”, she is representative of a “generation [of musicians] who has only known the virtual, the digital and the synthetic”.

In 2019, she was on the bill at DGTL, Dour, Weather, Soenda, and Solidays.

In 2019, she created her own label, Mama Told Ya, then the collective Mama Loves Ya which promotes the ecological transition in the nightlife world.

== Discography ==
=== EP et VA ===
- Ophiuchus, novembre 2015, Work Them Records
- Tomorrows DNA, 2016 - Reclaim Your city
- Leftover Love, 2016, Blocaus Series
- Endless Sea, 2017 - Blocaus Series
- Acid Train, 2017 - Anagram
- Acid Science split EP with Cadency, 2018 - Oaks
- Bionic Romance, 2018 - Blocaus Series
- Don't Rush To Grow Up, 2019 - Mama Told Ya
- It's Okay To Cry, 2021 - Mama Told Ya

=== DJ Mix ===
- RYC Podcast 142, 2015
- Invite's Choice Podcast 203, 2015
- Erratic Podcast 115, 2016
- Invite's Choice Podcast 327, 2016
- Curated by DSH #060, 2017
- Electronic Explorations 464, 2017
- Groove Podcast 188, 2018
- Fabric x DVS1 Curates Promo Mix 2019
- Fast Forward Productions #34, 2019
