= Psychobuildings =

- Origin: Brooklyn, New York, U.S.
- Genres: Indie pop, chillwave, dream pop
- Labels: All Hands Electric; Transparent Records; Wondersound Records
- Members: Peter LaBier; Juan Pieczanski
- Past members: Jeff Curtin; Samer Ghadry; Emily Panic; Peter Schuette
- Website: http://psychobuildings.com

Psychobuildings is a band formed in 2010 by frontman Peter LaBier alongside Juan Pieczanski (of Small Black), based in Brooklyn, New York. Psychobuildings has been described by Peter Macia of The Fader as being "Like 'Ghostrider' filtered through 'Let's Dance'".

== History ==
Initially started as a recording project by musician and visual artist Peter LaBier. He was later joined by multi-instrumentalist and producer Juan Pieczanski of Small Black along with Peter Schuette of Silk Flowers, who added synths to the group's first singles and EP.

After receiving positive reviews from The Fader, Spin, BrooklynVegan, Pitchfork, Vice and NME, the group released their first 7 inch single, "No Man's Land" / "Portrait", on the UK based label Transparent. Their second single, "Birds of Prey" / "Paradise", was released by the Brooklyn based indie label All Hands Electric. Their subsequent self titled EP, Psychobuildings, was also released by All Hands Electric, with album art by Ryan Johnson. Their EP Hearts was released in 2012 on Wondersound Records.

After a hiatus, the group began releasing new music in late 2019 starting with the singles "Other World" and "The Back Door".

Peter LaBier was born and raised in Washington, DC, and has exhibited his artwork nationally and internationally. He received his bachelor's degree from Vassar College in 2003 and an MFA in visual arts from Columbia University in 2017.

Featuring his lively dancing, LaBier's live show has been described as being "inspired by [James] Brown's moves as well as his sounds" by writer Brandon Stosuy of Stereogum. LaBier himself lists various influences which include Michael Jackson and James Brown.

In addition to his work as a musician and visual artist, LaBier has directed music videos including "Feed Me Diamonds" by MNDR, starring Raven from RuPaul's Drag Race.

== Discography ==
=== Studio albums ===
- Love World (Wondersound)

=== Extended plays ===
- Self Titled (All Hands Electric)
- Hearts (Wondersound)

=== Singles ===
- "No Man's Land/Portrait" (Transparent)
- "Birds of Prey/Paradise" (All Hands Electric)
- "Other World" (self-released)
- "The Back Door" (self-released)
- "Inside Out" (self-released)
- "House of Fame" (self-released)
- "M'lia" (self-released)
- "Push Me Harder" (self-released)
- "Exit" (self-released)
