= Home Video (band) =

American electronic rock band

- Origin: Brooklyn, New York, United States
- Genres: Electronic rock
- Years active: 2004–present
- Labels: Warp; Defend
- Members: David Gross; Collin Ruffino
- Website: homevideomusic.com

Home Video is an American electronic rock duo from Brooklyn, New York, composed of David Gross (keyboard/bass/sequencer) and Collin Ruffino (vocals/guitar).

== History ==
Originally from New Orleans, David Gross and Collin Ruffino began playing music under the name Home Video when they both moved to New York City. It was there that they were discovered by Warp Records, who put out the band's first two releases in 2004, the single "That You Might" and the Citizen EP, which garnered the attention of such outlets as BBC Radio 1, NME, and Rolling Stone. In 2006, Defend Music released the duo's first full-length album, No Certain Night or Morning, preceded by the single "Penguin," which included a remix by DFA Records's Tim Goldsworthy. In 2009, they released the EP It Will Be Ok.

Home Video released their sophomore album, The Automatic Process, in 2010. This was followed by the EP A Quiet Place a year later. In 2014, the duo issued their third album, Here in Weightless Fall.

== Discography ==
- Citizen (EP, 2004)
- No Certain Night or Morning (2006)
- It Will Be Ok (EP, 2009)
- The Automatic Process (2010)
- A Quiet Place (EP, 2011)
- Here in Weightless Fall (2014)

== Videos ==
- "Sleep Sweet"
- "I Can Make You Feel It"
- "Live at Mercury Lounge (New York City)"
