= Never Going Home =

Single by Kungs

from the album Club Azur
- Released: 21 May 2021
- Genre: House
- Length: 2:50
- Label: Island Records
- Songwriters: Andrea Tirone; Martin Picandet; Valentin Brunel
- Producers: Kungs; Boys Noize

Kungs singles chronology
| "Dopamine" (2020) | "Never Going Home" (2021) | "Regarde-moi" (2021) |

Music video
- "Never Going Home" on YouTube

"Never Going Home" is a song by French DJ Kungs. It was released on 21 May 2021 via Island Records from his upcoming second studio album. The song prominently samples the 2017 single "Idol" by Italian producer Mind Enterprises. It reached top 10 in France, Poland, Croatia, Dutch Top 40 and Flanders, and number one in Wallonia.

== Music video ==
The music video was released on 21 May 2021 via YouTube, The video was filmed at Cercle des Nageurs in Marseille, France. It features people from several generations "letting themselves be carried away by the music".

== Credits and personnel ==
Credits adapted from All Music.

- Kungs – producer, composer, primary artist,
- Mike Marsh – mastering engineer
- Martin Picandet – composer, vocal
- Alexander Ridha – producer, mixing
- Andrea Tirone – composer

== Charts ==
=== Weekly charts ===
Weekly chart performance for "Never Going Home"
| Chart (2021–2023) | Peak position |
|---|---|
| Belarus Airplay (TopHit) | 143 |
| Belgium (Ultratop 50 Flanders) | 5 |
| Belgium (Ultratop 50 Wallonia) | 1 |
| CIS Airplay (TopHit) | 5 |
| Croatia (HRT) | 9 |
| France (SNEP) | 5 |
| Germany (GfK) | 47 |
| Hungary (Dance Top 40) | 5 |
| Hungary (Rádiós Top 40) | 9 |
| Hungary (Single Top 40) | 3 |
| Hungary (Stream Top 40) | 23 |
| Israel (Media Forest) | 10 |
| Italy (FIMI) | 13 |
| Kazakhstan Airplay (TopHit) | 60 |
| Netherlands (Dutch Top 40) | 6 |
| Netherlands (Single Top 100) | 18 |
| Poland Airplay (ZPAV) | 3 |
| Russia Airplay (TopHit) | 3 |
| Slovakia Airplay (ČNS IFPI) | 14 |
| Slovakia Singles Digital (ČNS IFPI) | 95 |
| Switzerland (Schweizer Hitparade) | 16 |
| Ukraine Airplay (TopHit) | 196 |

=== Monthly charts ===
Monthly chart performance for "Never Going Home"
| Chart (2021–2023) | Peak position |
|---|---|
| CIS Airplay (TopHit) | 10 |
| Kazakhstan Airplay (TopHit) | 76 |
| Russia Airplay (TopHit) | 10 |
| Slovakia (Rádio – Top 100) | 19 |

=== Year-end charts ===
2021 year-end chart performance for "Never Going Home"
| Chart (2021) | Position |
|---|---|
| Belgium (Ultratop Flanders) | 39 |
| Belgium (Ultratop Wallonia) | 5 |
| CIS Airplay (TopHit) | 42 |
| France (SNEP) | 24 |
| Hungary (Dance Top 40) | 34 |
| Hungary (Single Top 40) | 23 |
| Hungary (Stream Top 40) | 71 |
| Italy (FIMI) | 53 |
| Netherlands (Dutch Top 40) | 50 |
| Netherlands (Single Top 100) | 77 |
| Poland (ZPAV) | 14 |
| Russia Airplay (TopHit) | 37 |
| Switzerland (Schweizer Hitparade) | 57 |

2022 year-end chart performance for "Never Going Home"
| Chart (2022) | Position |
|---|---|
| Belgium (Ultratop 50 Flanders) | 104 |
| Belgium (Ultratop 50 Wallonia) | 120 |
| CIS Airplay (TopHit) | 127 |
| Hungary (Dance Top 40) | 7 |
| Poland (ZPAV) | 81 |
| Russia Airplay (TopHit) | 169 |

2023 year-end chart performance for "Never Going Home"
| Chart (2023) | Position |
|---|---|
| Hungary (Dance Top 40) | 49 |

== Certifications ==
Certifications for "Never Going Home"
| Region | Certification | Certified units/sales |
|---|---|---|
| France (SNEP) | Diamond | 333,333^{‡} |
| Germany (BVMI) | Gold | 200,000^{‡} |
| Italy (FIMI) | 2× Platinum | 140,000^{‡} |
| Poland (ZPAV) | 3× Platinum | 150,000^{‡} |
^{‡} Sales+streaming figures based on certification alone.

== Release history ==
Release history for "Never Going Home"
| Region | Date | Format | Label | Ref. |
|---|---|---|---|---|
| Various | 21 May 2021 | Digital download; streaming | Island Records | |
| Italy | 21 May 2021 | Contemporary hit radio | Universal | |

== See also ==
- List of Ultratop 50 number-one singles of 2021
