= Kanya Sesser =

American para-athlete and model

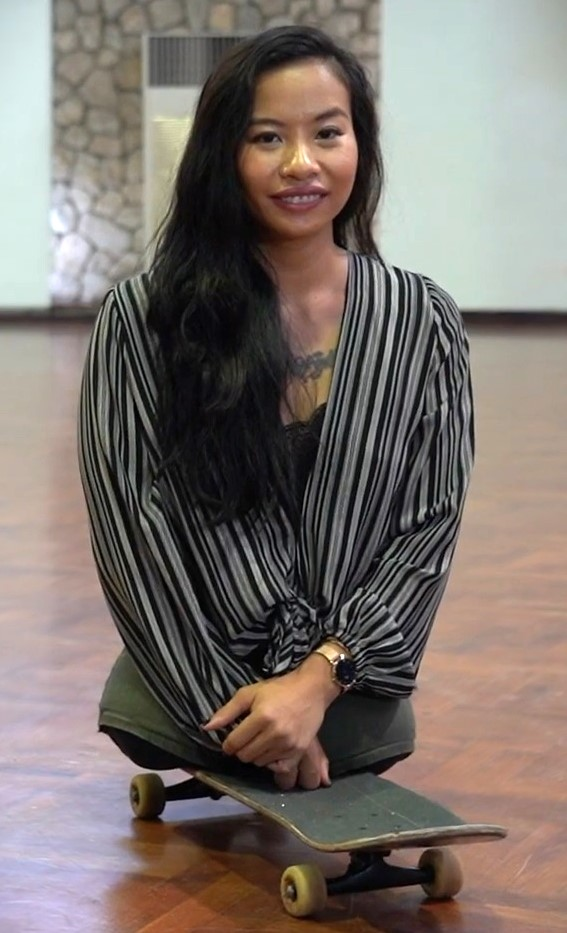
- Sesser at US Embassy Bangkok in 2018
- Born: September 1992 (age 33); Thailand
- Occupation(s): Para-athlete model

Kanya Sesser (born September 1992) is an American para-athlete and model. She is known for having had a lifelong congenital absence of both legs. She was born in Thailand, was raised in Portland, Oregon, and currently lives in California.

== Biography ==
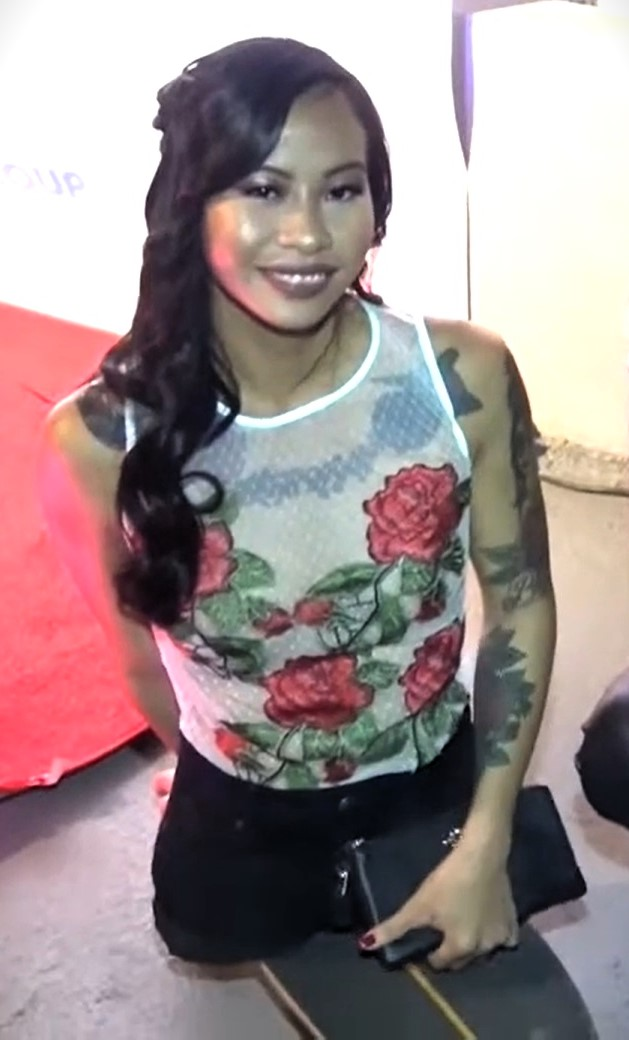
Sesser in 2017

=== Early life and education ===
Sesser was born in 1992 with a congenital absence of both legs. As an infant, she was abandoned outside a Buddhist temple in Pak Chong, Thailand. She was found by a woman passing by on 13 September 1992, who picked up the baby Sesser, washed the debris off, and called the city police to take the baby to the hospital. There, Sesser spent the next few years under the care of hospital staff, especially a nurse whom she called Mae (mother) Chan, as the police unsuccessfully searched for her birth family.

In May 1998, Sesser was adopted by an American family and came to the Pacific Northwest, where her adoptive parents raised her in Portland, Oregon. She found it hard to integrate and could not speak English until the age of nine. She also taught herself to walk on her hands. Sesser also had several surgeries on her hands due to having had webbed fingers on one hand and an extra finger on the other. In her childhood, Sesser tried adaptive sports, such as wheelchair basketball, racing, tennis, and rugby.

At the age of 15, Sesser began modeling for sports brands such as Billabong. She also was never bullied at school, was a cheerleader until freshman year of high school, and almost was voted prom queen.

=== Career ===
As an adult, Sesser lives in California. She planned to compete at the 2018 Winter Paralympics in Pyeongchang, South Korea. She also played Rosey Valera, a professional surfer, in Hawaii Five-0, as well as playing a stunt zombie in The Walking Dead. She participates in sports such as skateboarding, surfing, snowboarding, skiing, and basketball.
