= Michna (electronic artist) =

Adrian Michna
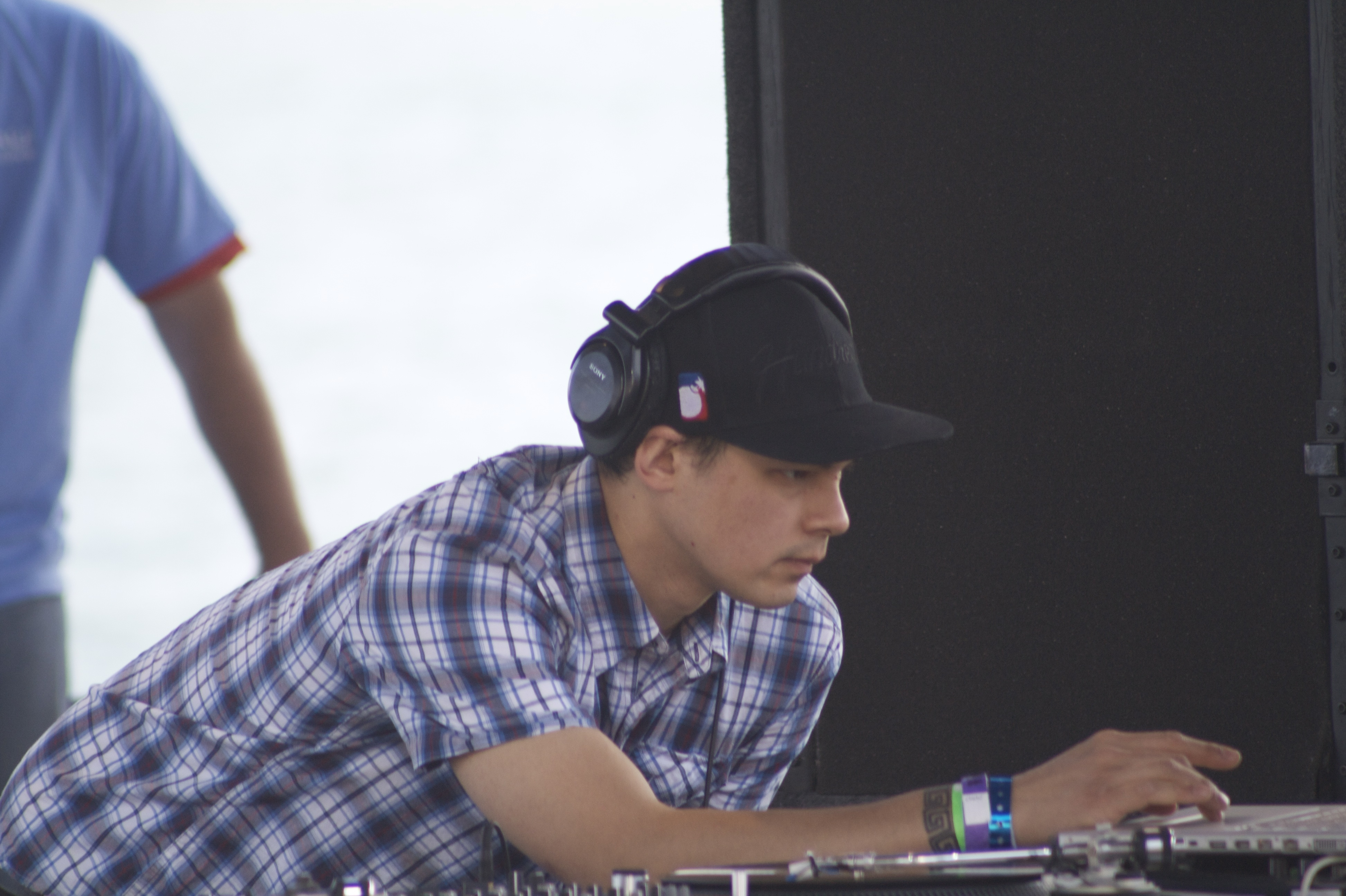
- Michna performing at Movement Electronic Music Festival 2019, in Michigan

Background information
- Also known as: Michna
- Born: Westchester County, New York, US
- Occupation(s): Producer, DJ, musician
- Instrument(s): Computer, turntables, sampler, drum machine, synthesizer, trombone, vocals
- Years active: 2000–present
- Labels: Ghostly International
- Website: michnaofficial.com

Adrian Yin Michna is an American DJ and music producer, performing under the mononym Michna. He is currently based in Brooklyn and is signed to Ghostly International.

== Career ==
Michna started out his musical career as a trombonist, playing shows in New York at the Lion's Den and CBGB's. In the mid-1990s he founded the DJ collective Secret Frequency Crew, who released their music via mail-order. Michna signed with Ghostly International in early 2007 and in 2008 he released his debut album, "Magic Monday", which The Fader described as "genreless and timeless". In July 2009, Michna released "Eggstra EP". Then, in September 2012, Ghostly released the "Moving Mountains" EP. On February 3, 2015, Ghostly released Michna's sophomore LP "Thousand Thursday". In October of that year, the Museum of Modern Art hosted an exhibition of Michna's work along with sound artist Yuri Suzuki.

== Commissioned Work ==
Michna has created music for television, video games, and commercials.

=== Television ===
In 2013, "Swiss Glide" was licensed to HBO for 2 episodes of Mike Judge's Silicon Valley: season 1 episode 3: "Articles of Incorporation" and season 1 episode 7: "Proof of Concept".

=== Video games ===
In 2014, Michna was commissioned to write 3 original songs for Sony's Hohokum Soundtrack. They are "Emerald Plateaus", "The Best Way Out Is Through", and "Increasing Ambition".

=== Commercials ===
In 2014 Michna was commissioned to compose original music for Nike's release of the Lebron 12 shoe. Michna's song "Triple Chrome Dipped" was used in 2014 for The Truth's TV Spot, "Response".

== Discography ==
=== Albums ===
- "Magic Monday" (2008)
- "Thousand Thursday" (2015)

=== EPs ===
- "Selections from Magic Monday" (2008)
- "Eggstra" (2009)
- "Moving Mountains" (2012)

== See also ==
- List of ambient music artists
