= Phantogram discography =

List of works by American music duo

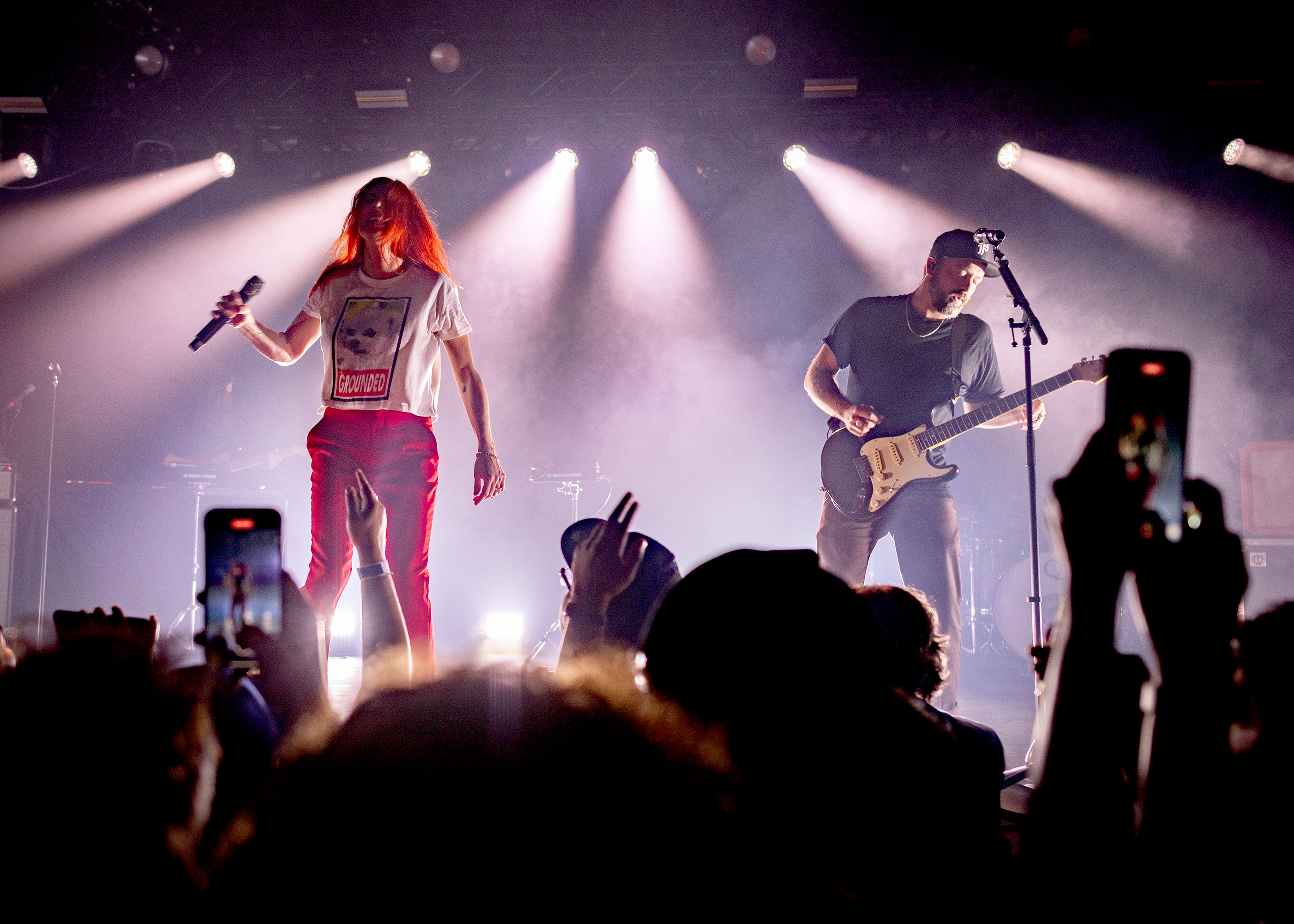
- Phantogram at The Bellwether in 2023
- Studio albums: 5
- EPs: 4
- Singles: 24
- Music videos: 10

The discography of Phantogram, an American music duo formed in 2007, consists of five studio albums, four extended plays, 24 singles, ten music videos, and various other appearances.

== Studio albums ==
Phantogram albums
Title	Album details	Peak chart positions						Sales
Title	Album details	US	US Alt	US Indie	US Rock	AUS	CAN	Sales
Eyelid Movies	Released: February 9, 2010; Label(s): BBE/Indica/Barsuk/Ghostly	— (Note: Eyelid Movies did not enter the US Billboard 200, but peaked at number 7 on the US Heatseekers Albums Chart.)	—	38	—	—	—	
Voices	Released: February 18, 2014; Label: Barsuk/Republic	11	3	—	3	— (Note: Voices did not enter the Australian ARIA Albums Chart but peaked at number 13 on the ARIA Hitseekers Chart.)	—	US: 115,000
Three	Released: October 7, 2016; Label: Fiction (UK)/Republic (US)	9	3	—	3	93	38	US: 23,000
Ceremony	Released: March 6, 2020; Label: Republic	75	5	—	8	—	—	
Memory of a Day	Released: October 18, 2024; Label: Neon Gold	— (Note: Memory of a Day did not enter the US Billboard 200, but peaked at number 47 on the Top Current Albums Chart.)	—	—	—	—	—	
"—" denotes album that did not chart or was not released

== EPs ==
Phantogram EPs
Title	EP details	Peak chart positions			
Title	EP details	US	US Alt	US Indie	US Rock
Charlie Everywhere EP 1 (as Charlie Everywhere)	Released: 2007; Label(s): Self-released	—	—	—	—
Charlie Everywhere EP 2 (as Charlie Everywhere)	Released: 2008; Label(s): Self-released	—	—	—	—
Phantogram	Released: 2009; Label(s): CE	—	—	—	—
Running from the Cops	Released: 2009; Label(s): BBE	—	—	—	—
Nightlife	Released: November 1, 2011; Label(s): Barsuk	122	16	21	25
Phantogram	Released: September 30, 2013; Label(s): Republic	155	—	—	—
Spotify Sessions	Released: August 12, 2014; Label(s): Republic	—	—	—	—
"—" denotes album that did not chart or was not released

== Singles ==
=== As lead artist ===
List of singles, with selected chart positions and certifications, showing year released and album name
Title	Year	Peak chart positions								Certifications	Album
Title	Year	US Bub.	US AAA	US Alt.	US Dance	US Rock	CAN Rock	MEX Air.	NZ Hot	Certifications	Album
"Mouthful of Diamonds"	2009	—	—	—	—	—	—	—	—		Eyelid Movies
"When I'm Small"	2009	—	—	—	—	—	—	—	—	RIAA: Gold; BPI: Silver; RMNZ: Gold	Eyelid Movies
"As Far as I Can See"	2011	—	—	—	—	—	—	—	—		Eyelid Movies
"Don't Move"	2011	—	—	—	—	—	—	—	—	RIAA: Gold	Nightlife
"Black Out Days"	2013	—	—	—	—	—	—	—	—	RIAA: 2x Platinum; BPI: Gold; RMNZ: Platinum	Phantogram
"Bill Murray"	2013	—	—	—	—	—	—	—	—		Voices
"Fall in Love"	2013	13	26	3	—	16	25	37	—	RIAA: Platinum	Voices
"Nothing But Trouble"	2014	—	—	—	—	—	—	—	—		Voices
"Black Out Days" (re-release)	2014	—	—	32	—	—	—	—	—		Voices
"You Don't Get Me High Anymore"	2016	—	—	6	—	19	18	—	—		Three
"Run Run Blood"	2016	—	—	—	—	—	—	—	—		Three
"Cruel World"	2016	—	—	—	—	—	—	—	—		Three
"Same Old Blues"	2016	—	—	34	—	—	39	—	—		Three
"Someday / Saturday"	2018	—	—	—	—	—	—	—	—		Non-album single
"Into Happiness"	2019	—	—	21	29	— (Note: "Into Happiness" did not enter the Rock Songs chart, but peaked at number 39 on the Rock & Alternative Airplay chart.)	—	—	—		Ceremony
"Mister Impossible"	2019	—	—	—	—	—	—	—	—		Ceremony
"In a Spiral"	2019	—	—	—	—	—	—	—	—		Ceremony
"Pedestal"	2020	—	—	—	—	—	—	—	—		Ceremony
"Me & Me"	2020	—	—	—	—	—	—	—	—		Non-album single
"Suzie"	2022	—	—	—	—	—	—	—	—		Eyelid Movies
"Black Out Days" (Subtronics Remix)	2023	—	—	—	42	—	—	—	30		Non-album single
"All a Mystery"	2024	—	—	—	—	—	—	—	—		Memory of a Day
"Happy Again"	2024	—	—	—	—	—	—	—	—		Memory of a Day
"Come Alive"	2024	—	—	24	—	—	—	—	—		Memory of a Day
"It Wasn't Meant to Be"	2024	—	—	—	—	—	—	—	—		Memory of a Day
"Black Out Days (Stay Away)" (with Ian Asher)	2025	—	—	—	8	—	—	—	21		Non-album singles
"In My Head" (with Whethan)	2025	—	—	—	—	—	—	—	—		Non-album singles
"—" denotes a recording that did not chart or was not released in that territory.

=== As featured artist ===
List of singles as featured artist, showing year released
Title	Year	Peak chart positions	Album
Title	Year	NZ Hot	Album
"Parallel Lines" (A-Trak featuring Phantogram)	2016	—	Non-album single
"Driving to Texas" (Tom Morello featuring Phantogram)	2021	—	The Atlas Underground Fire
"Forever" (Peking Duk featuring Phantogram)	2026	32	Paradise

== Music videos ==
List of music videos, showing year released and directors
Title	Year	Director(s)
"Running from the Cops"	2009	Naje Lataillade
"Mouthful of Diamonds"	2010	Drew Norton
"As Far as I Can See"	2011	Ewan MacLeod
"When I'm Small"	2011	Isaac Ravishankara
"Don't Move"	2012	John Carter and Will Joines
"Black Out Days"	2013	Evan Spencer Brace
"Fall in Love"	2014	Timothy Saccenti
"You Don't Get Me High Anymore"	2016	Grant Singer
"Funeral Pyre"	2017	Gianluca Minucci
"Into Happiness"	2019	Floria Sigismondi

== Guest appearances ==
List of non-single guest appearances, showing year released and album name
Title	Year	Other artist(s)	Album
"Objectum Sexuality"	2012	Big Boi	Vicious Lies and Dangerous Rumors
"CPU"	2012	Big Boi	Vicious Lies and Dangerous Rumors
"Lines"	2012	Big Boi, A$AP Rocky	Vicious Lies and Dangerous Rumors
"Lights"	2013	None	The Hunger Games: Catching Fire – Original Motion Picture Soundtrack
"You Lust"	2013	The Flaming Lips	The Terror
"K.Y.S.A."	2015	The Alchemist and Oh No	Welcome to Los Santos
"Slab of Butter (Scorpion)" (Sarah Barthel)	2015	Miley Cyrus	Miley Cyrus & Her Dead Petz
"Take Me Home"	2016	None	The Time Is Now
"You Are So Beautiful"	2020	None	Good Music to Avert the Collapse of American Democracy, Volume 2

== As Big Grams ==
- Big Grams with Big Boi; (2015, Epic)

== See also ==
- Big Boi discography
