= John Hill (record producer) =

Songwriter and record producer

- Born: John Graham Hill
- Occupations: Record producer; mixing engineer; audio engineer; writer

John Graham Hill is an American record producer and songwriter. Best known for his work in alternative rock music, Hill produced the entirety of Cage the Elephant's fifth album Social Cues (2019), which won Best Rock Album at the 62nd Annual Grammy Awards. Hill was also nominated for Producer of the Year, Non-Classical at the 57th and 62nd Annual Grammy Awards.

Hill has written and produced for artists such as Banks, Bleachers, Carly Rae Jepsen, Charli XCX, Christina Aguilera, Christina Perri, Damiano David, Demi Lovato, Elle King, Eminem, Florence + the Machine, Foster The People, Imagine Dragons, Jay-Z, Kesha, Khalid, Kimbra, Kings of Leon, M.I.A., Nas, Natasha Bedingfield, P!nk, Big Boi, Phantogram, Portugal. The Man, Rihanna, Shakira, Slayyyter, Tinashe, Wu-Tang Clan, Little Mix and Zara Larsson.

== Discography ==
Artist	Release	Year	Record label	Credit
Carly Rae Jepsen	"Something Tragic" and "That's Just Me" from Day and Night	2026	Schoolboy / Interscope Records	Producer, co-writer
Florence Road	"Heavy" from Fall Back (EP)	2025	Warner Records	Producer, co-writer
Carly Rae Jepsen	"Anything to Be with You" from The Loveliest Time	2023	Schoolboy / Interscope Records	Producer
Carly Rae Jepsen	"Come Over" from The Loveliest Time	2023	Schoolboy / Interscope Records	Producer, co-writer
Half Alive	"Never Been Better (feat. Orla Gartland)", "Everything Machine", and "Bad Thoughts" from Conditions of a Punk	2022	RCA Records	Producer, co-producer
Carly Rae Jepsen	"Sideways" and "Bad Thing Twice" from The Loneliest Time	2022	Schoolboy / Interscope Records	Producer, co-writer
Young the Giant	"My Way" and "The Walk Home" from Act II: Exile (EP)	2022	Jungle Youth Records	Co-writer
Young the Giant	Act II: Exile (EP)	2022	Jungle Youth Records	Producer
Superorganism	"Black Hole Baby", "Solar System", and "Crushed.zip" from World Wide Pop	2022	Domino Recording	Producer, co-writer
Young the Giant	Act I: Origins (EP)	2022	Jungle Youth Records	Producer
Foals	Life Is Yours	2022	Warner Music UK	Producer
Sigrid	"Grow" from How To Let Go	2022	Island Records	Producer, co-writer
The Head and the Heart	"Paradigm" from Every Shade of Blue	2022	Warner Records	Producer, co-writer
Superorganism	"Crushed.zip"	2022	Domino Recording	Co-producer
Foals	"Looking High", "2am", and "Wake Me Up"	2022	Warner Records UK	Producer
Blu DeTiger	"Hot Crush Lover"	2022	Capitol Records	Co-producer, co-writer
Oliver Tree	"Swing & A Miss", "Things We Used to Do", "Playing with Fire" from Cowboy Tears	2022	Atlantic Records	Producer, co-writer
Half Alive	"Everything Machine" from Give Me Your Shoulders, Pt.1	2022	RCA Records	Producer
FKA Twigs	"Measure of a Man (feat. Central Cee)" from The King's Man	2021	MARV/Parlophone	Producer, co-writer
G Flip (featuring UPSAHL)	"Scream"	2021	Future Classic	Producer, co-writer
Amy Allen	"R.I.P." and "A Woman's World" from AWW! (EP)	2021	Warner Records	Co-producer, co-writer
Alt Bloom	"High School"	2021	BigMTN Records	Producer
Noah Kahan	"Bury Me" from I Was/ I Am	2021	Republic Records	Co-writer
Luke Hemmings	"Baby Blue" and "Diamonds" from When Facing the Things We Turn Away From	2021	Sony Music Australia	Producer, co-writer
Arlie	"Poppin"	2021	Atlantic Records	Producer, co-writer
Tinashe (featuring Absolutely)	"333" from 333	2021	Tinashe Music	Producer, co-writer
Khalid	"New Normal"	2021	RCA	Producer, co-writer
Chicano Batman	Dark Star B/W Pastel Sunrise	2021	ATO Records	Producer
Tune-Yards	"Make It Right" from Sketchy	2021	4AD	Co-producer
Pink Sweat$	"Pink City", "So Sweet","Chains", "At My Worst", "17", "Lows", "Not Alright" and "At My Worst" (featuring Kehlani) from Pink Planet	2021	Atlantic Records	Producer, co-writer
Christian Leave	Heavy Hitting Hurts My Head EP	2021	Warner Records	Producer
Isaac Dunbar	"Pink Party"	2021	RCA, Sony	Producer, co-writer
Eliza & The Delusionals	"Sentimental"	2020	Cooking Vinyl	Co-writer
Wafia	"Pick Me" from Good Things EP	2020	Atlantic, Rodeo Records	Producer, co-writer
Sylvan Esso	"Ferris Wheel" from Free Love	2020	Loma Vista Recordings	Producer, co-writer
Raye	"Natalie Don't" - single	2020	Polydor	Producer, co-writer
Carly Rae Jepsen	"Summer Love" and "Felt This Way" from Dedicated Side B	2020	Schoolboy, Interscope Records	Producer, co-writer
Levin Kali	"Day After the Rain" from Hightide	2020	Interscope Records	Co-producer, co-writer
Regard & Raye	"Secrets"	2020	Ministry of Sound	Co-producer, co-writer
Wallows	"OK"	2020	Atlantic Records	Producer
Joywave	"Coming Apart" from Possession	2020	Hollywood Records	Producer
HOKO	"OK OK"	2020	EQT Recordings	Co-producer, co-writer
Celeste	"Stop This Flame"	2020	Polydor	Producer
Kesha	"My Own Dance" and "Resentment" (featuring Sturgill Simpson, Brian Wilson, and Wrabel) from High Road	2020	Kemosabe Records	Producer, co-writer
Lauv (featuring LANY)	"Mean It" from How I'm Feeling	2019	AWAL	Co-writer
Mondo Cozmo	"Generator"	2020	Last Gang Records	Co-writer
Bishop Briggs	"My Shine" from Champion	2019	Island Records	Producer, co-writer
Camila Cabello	"Easy" from Romance	2019	Epic Records	Co-producer, co-writer
Sturgill Simpson	Sound & Fury	2019	Elektra	Co-producer
MUNA	"Stayaway" from Saves the World	2019	RCA	Producer
Cage the Elephant	Social Cues	2019	RCA	Producer, co-writer
Khalid	"Paradise", "Hundred", "Outta My Head (with John Mayer)", and "Alive" from Free Spirit	2019	RCA Records	Producer, co-writer
Carly Rae Jepsen	"I'll Be Your Girl", "Happy Not Knowing", "Automatically in Love", "Too Much", "No Drug like Me", and "Feels Right" from Dedicated	2019	Interscope	Producer, co-writer
The Head and the Heart	"Missed Connection" from Living Mirage	2019	WBR	Co-writer
Wrabel	"Love to Love U" and "The Real Thing" from One of Those Happy People EP	2019	Big Gay Records	Producer, co-writer
NIKI	"Move!" from Wanna Take This Downtown?	2019	88Rising	Producer, co-writer
Wild Belle	"Mockingbird" from Everybody One of a Kind	2019	Love Tone, AWAL	Producer, co-writer
Alice Merton	"Funny Business" from Mint	2019	Mom + Pop	Producer, co-writer
L Devine	"Nervous"	2018	Warner UK	Co-producer, co-writer
Khalid	"Vertigo" from Suncity	2018	RCA Records	Producer, co-writer
Young The Giant	"Superposition", "Call Me Back", "Heat Of The Summer", "Brother's Keeper", and "Panoramic Girl" from Mirror Master	2018	Elektra	Producer, co-writer
Imagine Dragons	"Zero" from Ralph Breaks the Internet	2018	Walt Disney Records	Producer, co-writer
Bishop Briggs	"Baby" – single	2018	Island Records	Producer, co-writer
Wafia	"I'm Good"	2018	Future Classic	Co-producer, co-writer
MØ feat. Diplo	"Sun In Our Eyes"	2018	Sony Music UK	Co-producer, co-writer
Mondo Cozmo	"Tonight Tonight"	2018	Polydor	Producer, co-writer
MNDR	"Gravity"- single	2018	Mom + Pop	Co-producer, co-writer
Wet	"Lately" from Still Run	2018	Columbia Records	Producer
Plan B	"Sepia" from Heaven Before All Hell Breaks Loose	2018	Warner UK	Producer, co-writer
Bishop Briggs	"Water" from Church of Scars	2018	Island Records	Producer, co-writer
Whethan and Dua Lipa	"High" from Fifty Shades Freed	2018	Universal	Producer, co-writer
Rat Boy	"Slave to the System" from Civil Disorder	2018	Parlophone	Producer, co-writer
Sylvan Esso	"PARAD(w/m)E"	2018	Loma Vista Records	Producer, co-writer
Demi Lovato	"Tell Me You Love Me" from Tell Me You Love Me	2017	Island Records	Producer, writer
Foster The People	"Harden the Paint" from Sacred Hearts Club	2017	Columbia Records	Producer, co-writer
Portugal. The Man	"Feel It Still", "Live in the Moment", "Rich Friends", "Easy Tiger", and "Tidal Wave" from Woodstock	2017	Atlantic	Producer, co-writer
Imagine Dragons	"Rise Up" from Evolve	2017	Interscope	Producer, co-writer
Tei Shi	"Say You Do" from Crawl Space	2017	Downtown, Interscope	Producer, co-writer
Zara Larsson	"Make That Money Girl" from So Good	2017	Epic, TEN	Producer, co-writer
Charli XCX	"Babygirl" (featuring Uffie) from Number 1 Angel	2017	Asylum, Atlantic	Producer, co-writer
Electric Guest	"Zero" and "Glorious Warrior" from Plural	2017	Downtown/ Interscope	Producer, co-writer
Erik Hassle	"Missing You", "Breaking the Waves" and "Minnesota" from Innocence Lost	2017	TEN, RCA	Producer, writer
Mags Duval	"Pink Cadillac", "Stay Lonely", "Cinnamon Gum", and "Don't Ask Me"	2017	Creative Nation Records	Producer, co-writer
Banks	"Poltergeist" from The Altar	2016	Harvest Records	Co-producer, co-writer
Phantogram	"Funeral Pyre" from Three	2016	Republic Records	Co-producer
AlunaGeorge	"Jealous" and "Wanderlust" from I Remember	2016	Island Records	Producer, writer
Vince Staples	"Smile" and "Loco" (featuring Kilo Kish) from Prima Donna	2016	Def Jam	Co-producer, co-writer
Elias	"Down n Out" and "Making Me Happy"	2016	Warner Bros	Producer, writer
Banks & Steelz	"Giant" from Anything But Words	2016	Warner Bros	Producer, writer
Corinne Bailey Rae	"Taken By Dreams" from The Heart Speaks in Whispers	2016	Virgin	Co-producer, co-writer
Santigold	"Banshee", "Walking In A Circle", "All I Got" from 99¢	2016	Atlantic	Producer, co-writer, additional production
CeeLo Green	"Race Against Time", "Smells like Fire", and "Est.1980's" from Heart Blanche	2015	Atlantic	Producer
Børns	"Dopamine" from Dopamine	2015	Interscope	Producer, writer
Florence + The Machine	"What Kind of Man" from How Big, How Blue, How Beautiful	2015	Universal	Producer, co-writer
Elle King	"Where the Devil Don't Go" and "Song of Sorrow" from Love Stuff	2015	RCA	Producer
Emile Haynie	"A Kiss Goodbye" (featuring Charlotte Gainsbourg, Sampha, and Devonte Hynes) and "Who to Blame" (featuring Randy Newman) from We Fall	2015	Interscope	Additional production, writer
Charli XCX	"Gold Coins" and "Breaking Up" from Sucker	2014	Neon Gold, Atlantic	Co-producer
Eminem	"Guts Over Fear" (featuring Sia)	2014	Shady/ Interscope	Producer, writer
Kimbra	"Goldmine" from The Golden Echo	2014	Warner Bros	Producer
Bleachers	Strange Desire	2014	RCA	Producer
Birdy	"All You Never Say" from Fire Within (US version)	2014	Atlantic	Producer
tUnE-yArDs	"Real Thing" and "Water Fountain" from Nikki Nack	2014	4AD	Additional production
Mr Little Jeans	"Mercy" and "Don't Run" from Pocketknife	2014	Harvest	Producer
Christina Perri	"Burning Gold" and "I Don't Wanna Break" from Head or Heart	2014	Atlantic	Producer
SKATERS	Manhattan	2014	Warner Brothers	Producer
Phantogram	Voices	2014	Universal	Producer
Shakira	"Can't Remember to Forget You" (featuring Rihanna)	2014	RCA	Producer, writer
Phantogram	"Lights" from The Hunger Games: Catching Fire – Original Motion Picture Soundtrack	2013	Universal	Producer
Mikky Ekko	"Kids"	2013	RCA	Co-producer, co-writer
The Vaccines	Melody Calling	2013	Sony UK	Producer, remixer
Mayer Hawthorne	"Robot Love" and "Fool" from Where Does This Door Go (Deluxe)	2013	Universal	Producer, co-writer
Empire of the Sun	"DNA" from Ice on the Dune	2013	Capitol	Co-writer
Snoop Lion	"Torn Apart" (featuring Rita Ora) from Reincarnated	2013	RCA	Producer, co-writer
Wavves	Afraid of Heights	2013	Mom+Pop, Warner Bros	Producer
Big Boi	"Shoes for Running" (featuring Wavves) from Vicious Lies and Dangerous Rumors	2012	Island Def Jam	Producer, co-writer
P!nk	"Are We All We Are" from The Truth About Love	2012	RCA	Producer, co-writer
Santigold	"Freak Like Me", "This Isn't Our Parade", and "Never Enough" from Master of My Make-Believe	2012	Downtown, Atlantic	Producer, co-writer
Santigold	"Look at These Hoes" from Master of My Make-Believe	2012	Downtown, Atlantic	Additional production
Rihanna	"You Da One" from Talk That Talk	2011	Island Def Jam	Co-writer
Lissy Trullie	Lissy Trullie	2009	Downtown	Producer, co-writer
Theophilus London	"Last Name London" and "Love Is Real" from Timez Are Weird These Days	2011	Reprise	Producer, co-writer
Portugal. The Man	In the Mountain in the Cloud	2011	Atlantic	Producer
Natasha Bedingfield	"Run Run Run" and "Little Too Much" from Strip Me	2010	Sony UK	Producer, co-writer
Shakira	"Devocion" and "Waka Waka (This Time for Africa)" from Sale el Sol	2010	Epic	Co-producer, co-writer
Shakira	"Gordita" and "Tu Boca" from Sale el Sol	2010	Epic	Additional production
M.I.A	Vicki Leekx	2010	N.E.E.T. Recordings	Producer, co-writer
Devo	"Don't Shoot" and "Fresh" from Something For Everybody	2010	Warner Brothers	Producer
Christina Aguilera	"Bionic", "Elastic Love", "Monday Morning", and "Bobblehead" from Bionic	2010	Sony	Producer, co-writer
Crookers	"Cooler Couleur (feat.Yelle)" from Tons of Friends	2010	Lektroluv	Co-producer, co-writer
Tinie Tempah	"Illusion" from Disc-Overy	2010	EMI	Producer, co-writer
M.I.A.	"Born Free", "Lovealot" and "Teqkilla" from MAYA	2010	XL, Interscope Records	Producer, co-writer
Amazing Baby	"Bayonet" from Rewild	2009	Shangri La	Producer
Shakira	"She Wolf", "Men In This Town", "Loba", and "Mon Amour" from She Wolf	2009	Epic	Producer, co-writer
Shakira	"Long Time", "Spy", "Good Stuff", and "Why Wait" from She Wolf	2009	Epic	Additional production
Jay Z	"Brooklyn Go Hard" (featuring Santigold) from Notorious	2009	Bad Boy	Co-writer
Amanda Blank	"A Love Song" from I Love You	2009	Downtown	Co-writer
Kings of Leon	"Knocked Up" Lykke Li vs. Rodeo Remix	2008	RCA	Producer, engineer
Santigold	"L.E.S Artistes", "You'll Find A Way", "My Superman", "Lights Out", "Starstruck", "I'm a Lady", "Anne", "Shove It", and "Say Aha" from Santogold	2008	Downtown, Atlantic	Producer, co-writer, engineer, mixer
Santigold	"Unstoppable" from Santigold (album)	2008	Downtown, Atlantic	Producer
Shitake Money	Street Beef	2007	Outlook	Producer, writer, engineer, mixer
Dr Israel and Seven	Friction	2006	Dougl	Producer, mixer, engineer
Elkland	Golden	2005	Sony	Producer, mixer, engineer
Nas	Street's Disciple	2004		Mixer
Wu Tang	"Jah World" from The W	2000		Mixer

== See also ==
- Sound recording and reproduction
- Music industry
