= Fall Back (disambiguation) =

"Fall Back" is a song by Australian singer Lithe.

Fall Back may also refer to:

- Fall Back (mixtape), a mixtape by Irish indie rock quartet Florence Road
- "Fall Back", a song from Always Centered at Night
- "Fall Back", a song from Playing Robots into Heaven
