= Big Grams =

2015 studio album by Big Grams

EP by Big Grams (Big Boi & Phantogram)
- Released: September 25, 2015
- Recorded: 2015
- Genre: Experimental hip-hop
- Length: 26:35
- Label: Epic Records
- Producer: Phantogram; Skrillex; 9th Wonder

Big Boi chronology
Vicious Lies and Dangerous Rumors (2012)	Big Grams (2015)	Boomiverse (2017)

Phantogram chronology
Voices (2014)	Big Grams (2015)	Three (2016)

Big Grams is the self-titled debut EP by American hip-hop trio Big Grams, which consists of rapper Big Boi and electronic rock duo Phantogram. The EP was released on September 25, 2015, by Epic Records.

== Background and recording ==
In December 2010, Big Boi, one half of famed hip-hop duo Outkast, accidentally discovered Phantogram, an electronic rock duo consisting of Josh Carter and Sarah Barthel, when hearing their single "Mouthful of Diamonds" in a pop-up ad. Big Boi shared the song on his website as the "Jam of the Week". Barthel saw the post and contacted Big Boi, which led to future collaborations. Big Boi's 2012 studio album Vicious Lies and Dangerous Rumors, included three tracks featuring Phantogram: "Objectum Sexuality", "CPU" and "Lines", and in an interview days before its December 11 release, Big Boi revealed that he and Phantogram were planning to record a "one-off EP type of thing" titled Big Grams.

Carter described the project's sound as "sort of" "psyched-out hip-hop". Barthel and Big Boi provided sung vocals and rapped vocals respectively, while Carter only occasionally provided vocals and was the project's primary producer.

== Critical reception ==
Professional ratings
Aggregate scores
Source	Rating
Metacritic	61/100
Review scores
Source	Rating
AllMusic	3/5 stars
Consequence of Sound	B
The Guardian	3/5 stars
HipHopDX	3/5 stars
Pitchfork	6.4/10
Rolling Stone	2/5 stars
RapReviews.com	6.5/10

Big Grams received generally mixed reviews from music critics. At Metacritic, which assigns a normalized rating out of 100 to reviews from mainstream critics, the album received an average score of 61 based on 8 reviews, which indicates "generally positive reviews". David Jeffries of AllMusic said, "The MC's copious sex talk makes Phantogram seem like Catherine Deneuve and Bowie in The Hunger, a stoic and sexy duo who let others to do the "dirty work," and just like those vampires, this EP dazzles and then disappears before the sun comes up, leaving listeners with the exhilarating feeling of "wow," and the less-pleasing feeling of "what happened?" Lyndsey Havens of Consequence of Sound said, "Throughout Big Grams, Big Boi, Carter, and Barthel demonstrate their ability and willingness to take risks, even if some don't work as well as others ("Goldmine Junkie" features Barthel's futile attempt at rapping). But the downfalls of the LP are more or less overshadowed by the gambles that do pay off. And the biggest gamble of all? Tossing any and all expectations out the window." David Turner of Rolling Stone stated, "Even guest turns from Run the Jewels and Skrillex can't add enough energy to make Big Grams feel like anything more than an attempt at landing a better festival slot." Sheldon Pearce of HipHopDX said, "There's no creative expansion, just two acts trying to exist in their own worlds simultaneously instead of finding a new and interesting middle ground. Mixing classic Big Boi verses over old Phantogram songs would've probably been just as effective."

== Commercial performance ==
The album debuted at number 38 on the Billboard 200, selling 9,626 copies in the United States; "Lights On" reached No. 30 on the Billboard Alternative Songs chart.

== Track listing ==
No.	Title	Producer(s)	Length
1.	"Run for Your Life"	Phantogram	3:56
2.	"Lights On"	Phantogram	4:20
3.	"Fell in the Sun"	Phantogram	3:47
4.	"Put It on Her"	9th Wonder	2:51
5.	"Goldmine Junkie"	Phantogram	3:42
6.	"Born to Shine" (featuring Run the Jewels)	Phantogram	4:12
7.	"Drum Machine" (featuring Skrillex)	Skrillex	3:47

== Charts ==
Chart (2015)	Peak position
US Billboard 200	38
US Top Rap Albums (Billboard)	5
US Top Alternative Albums (Billboard)	9
