= Rock and Roll Bye Bye =

Studio album by Skaters
- Released: March 24, 2017
- Genre: Garage rock; psychedelic rock
- Length: 36:52
- Label: Yonks

Skaters chronology
Manhattan (2014)	Rock and Roll Bye Bye (2017)

Singles from Rock and Roll Bye Bye
- 1. "Mental Case" Released: October 23, 2015; 2. "Head On to Nowhere" Released: January 15, 2016; 3. "Rock and Roll Bye Bye" Released: May 13, 2016; 4. "In Your Head" Released: January 30, 2017

Professional ratings
Review scores
Source	Rating
Clash	7/10
DIY	3/5 stars

Rock and Roll Bye Bye is the second and final studio album from American rock band Skaters. It was released on March 24, 2017 under their own label, Yonks Records.

== Track listing ==
No.	Title	Length
1.	"Just Like Your Mother"	2:46
2.	"Northern Soul"	4:46
3.	"Clip Art Link 1 Bubbles"	0:48
4.	"Head On to Nowhere"	3:44
5.	"Restless Babe"	3:08
6.	"Song 19"	1:32
7.	"I'm Not a Punk"	4:02
8.	"Respect the Hustle"	3:19
9.	"Criminal"	2:52
10.	"Mental Case"	2:26
11.	"Rock and Roll Bye Bye"	3:04
12.	"In Your Head"	4:25
Total length:		36:52
