= Memory of a Day =

2024 studio album by Phantogram

Studio album by Phantogram
- Released: October 18, 2024
- Length: 44:38
- Label: Neon Gold
- Producer: Josh Carter; John Hill; Jennifer Decilveo; Sam de Jong

Phantogram chronology
Ceremony (2020)	Memory of a Day (2024)

Singles from Memory of a Day
- 1. "All a Mystery" Released: May 31, 2024; 2. "Happy Again" Released: August 9, 2024; 3. "Come Alive" Released: August 23, 2024; 4. "It Wasn't Meant to Be" Released: September 20, 2024; 5. "Attaway" Released: October 18, 2024

Professional ratings
Review scores
Source	Rating
AllMusic	4/5 stars
Spill Magazine	3.5/5 stars
The AU Review	4/5 stars

Memory of a Day is the fifth studio album by American electronic rock duo Phantogram. The album was released by Neon Gold Records on October 18, 2024.

According to band member Josh Carter, Memory of a Day was inspired by COVID-19 lockdowns, which reminded them of growing up in rural New York.

== Reception ==
A review in The Tennessean said that Phantogram's Memory of a Day "brings to the forefront one of the duo's best qualities: their unpredictability...Every song on the new record pushes the boundaries of pop music as we know it, leaving listeners absorbed in otherworldly synths, attention-commanding beats, hazy guitar and lush, compelling vocals."

== Deluxe Edition 2025 ==
On October 31, 2025, Phantogram released a digital-only deluxe version of Memory of a Day that includes three bonus tracks.

== Track listing ==
Memory of a Day track listing
No.	Title	Writer(s)	Producer(s)	Length
1.	"Jealousy"	Josh Carter; Sarah Barthel; John Hill; Ilsey Juber	Carter; Hill	3:02
2.	"It Wasn't Meant to Be"	Carter; Barthel; Hill; Amanda Warner	Carter; Hill	3:10
3.	"All a Mystery"	Carter; Barthel; Hill; Dan Wilson	Carter; Hill	3:09
4.	"Feedback Invisible"	Carter; Barthel; Hill; Warner; Wilson	Carter; Hill	3:01
5.	"Attaway"	Carter; Barthel; Hill; Mikky Ekko; Cary Singer	Carter; Hill	4:00
6.	"Running Through Colors"	Carter; Barthel; Hill; Wilson; Orlando Higginbottom; Sam de Jong	Carter; Hill; de Jong	3:36
7.	"I Wanna Know"	Carter; Barthel; Hill; Ekko; de Jong	Carter; Hill; de Jong	4:02
8.	"Ashes"	Carter; Barthel; Jennifer Decilveo	Carter; Hill; Decilveo	4:02
9.	"Come Alive"	Carter; Barthel; Hill; Wilson	Carter; Hill	4:13
10.	"Move In Silence"	Carter; Barthel; Hill	Carter; Hill	4:14
11.	"Happy Again"	Carter; Barthel; Hill; Wilson; John Blanda	Carter; Hill	4:02
12.	"Memory of a Day"	Carter; Barthel; Hill; Ekko	Carter; Hill	4:01
Total length:				44:38

2025 Deluxe Edition bonus tracks
No.	Title	Length
13.	"In My Head (feat. Whethan)"	4:10
14.	"Move In Silence (feat. Big Boi)"	4:47
15.	"Earthshaker"	2:59
