= Deadbolt (Skaters song) =

Single by Skaters

from the album Manhattan
- Released: October 25, 2013
- Recorded: 2013
- Genre: Punk rock; garage rock; indie rock
- Length: 3:04
- Label: Warner Bros. Records
- Songwriter(s): Michael Cummings; Noah Rubin; Joshua Hubbard; Dan Burke; Tommy Allen

Skaters singles chronology
"I Wanna Dance (But I Don't Know How)" (2013)	"Deadbolt" (2013)	"Save Her Something Special" (2015)

Deadbolt is the second single off of Skaters debut album Manhattan. It was the first song by the band to chart, reaching 34 on the Alternative Songs chart.

== Music video ==
A music video directed by Charlie Hogg for the song premiered on YouTube a week prior to the track's release.

The music video contains clips rotating between the band performing in a studio and in a warehouse. Interludes of the video are shot of the band walking around New York City, their hometown.

== Track listing ==
All tracks are written by Skaters.

No.	Title	Length
1.	"Deadbolt"	3:04
Total length:		3:04

== Chart positions ==
Chart (2014)	Peak position
US Alternative Airplay (Billboard)	34
