= Manhattan (Skaters album) =

Studio album by Skaters
- Released: February 24, 2014
- Studios: Electric Lady Studios in New York City, New York, Gemini Studios in Ipswich, United Kingdom, & Sonora Studio in Los Feliz, Los Angeles, California
- Genre: Post-punk revival
- Length: 33:49
- Label: Warner Bros.
- Producers: John Hill, Skaters

Skaters chronology
Schemers (2012)	Manhattan (2014)	Rock and Roll Bye Bye (2017)

Singles from Manhattan
- 1. "I Wanna Dance (But I Don't Know How)" Released: August 28, 2013; 2. "Deadbolt" Released: October 25, 2013

Professional ratings
Aggregate scores
Source	Rating
Metacritic	66/100
Review scores
Source	Rating
Consequence of Sound	C
Paste Magazine	8.3/10

Manhattan is the debut studio album from American rock band Skaters. It was released in February 2014 under Warner Bros. Records

== Track listing ==
No.	Title	Length
1.	"One of Us"	2:24
2.	"Miss Teen Massachusetts"	3:55
3.	"Deadbolt"	3:03
4.	"Band Breaker"	3:46
5.	"To Be Young in NYC"	3:26
6.	"Schemers"	2:47
7.	"Symptomatic"	3:11
8.	"Fear of the Knife"	2:56
9.	"I Wanna Dance (But I Don't Know How)"	2:58
10.	"Nice Hat"	2:13
11.	"This Much I Care"	3:10

== Personnel ==
- Michael Ian Cummings - vocals, guitar
- Josh Hubbard - guitar
- Dan Burke - bass
- Noah Rubin - drums
- Skaters - art direction, producers
- John Hill - producer
- Brian Gardner - mastering
- Cenzo Townshend - mixing
- Phil Joly - engineer
- Laura Sisk - engineer
- Emmett Farley - engineer
- Sean Julliard - assistant engineer
- Joe Maccann - assistant engineer
- Elizabeth Bauer - assistant engineer
- Nick Bobetsky - management
- Adam Herzog - A&R
- Jeff Sosnow - A&R
- Donny Phillips - art direction
- Jay Roeder - logo design
- Lele Saveri - photography
- Pete Volker - photography
- Kelsey Bennett - photography
- Shane McCauley - photography

== Charts ==
Chart (2014)	Peak position
US Heatseekers Albums (Billboard)	49
