= When Facing the Things We Turn Away From =

Studio album by Luke Hemmings
- Released: 13 August 2021
- Studio: Solag (Los Angeles); Groove Masters (Los Angeles); Five Starr (Los Angeles); Rodeo (Los Angeles)
- Length: 43:35
- Label: Sony Australia
- Producer: Sammy Witte

Luke Hemmings chronology
When Facing the Things We Turn Away From (2021)	Boy (2024)

Singles from When Facing the Things We Turn Away From
- 1. "Starting Line" Released: 30 June 2021; 2. "Motion" Released: 22 July 2021; 3. "Place in Me" Released: 6 August 2021; 4. "Baby Blue" Released: 13 August 2021

When Facing the Things We Turn Away From is the debut solo studio album from Australian singer-songwriter Luke Hemmings, lead vocalist and rhythm guitarist for Australian pop rock band 5 Seconds of Summer. The album was preceded by three singles and released on 13 August 2021.

The album was announced on 30 June 2021 alongside lead single "Starting Line". The project was co-written and produced by Sammy Witte. Hemmings described the album as "a project that grew out of a year of enforced stillness", and described it as a place of reflection on the past ten years of his life spent working and touring with 5 Seconds of Summer. The album sold nearly 6,000 copies in the United States in its first week.

== Reception ==
Professional ratings
Review scores
Source	Rating
Clash	8/10

Tanyel Gumushan from Clash said "When Facing the Things We Turn Away From is self-assured and confident. It is built on the foundations of classic rock songs, written on acoustic guitars and keys and follows the fool-proof formulas that has an unstoppable emotional pull... It's as though his strings have been cut and as a musician, Luke is moving freely for the first time."

== Track listing ==
When Facing the Things We Turn Away From track listing
No.	Title	Writer(s)	Length
1.	"Starting Line"	Luke Hemmings; Sammy Witte	4:30
2.	"Saigon"	Hemmings; Witte	3:41
3.	"Motion"	Hemmings; Witte	3:29
4.	"Place in Me"	Hemmings; Witte	3:07
5.	"Baby Blue"	Hemmings; Sierra Deaton; Witte; John Hill	3:43
6.	"Repeat"	Hemmings; Witte	3:32
7.	"Mum"	Hemmings; Witte	3:50
8.	"Slip Away"	Hemmings; Witte	3:52
9.	"Diamonds"	Hemmings; Witte; Hill	3:58
10.	"A Beautiful Dream"	Hemmings	3:11
11.	"Bloodline"	Hemmings; Deaton	2:04
12.	"Comedown"	Hemmings; Witte	4:38
Total length:			43:35

== Personnel ==
- Luke Hemmings – vocals, background vocals (all tracks); electric guitar (tracks 1–3, 5, 7, 9, 12), nylon guitar (1, 2), acoustic guitar (2–8, 12), slide guitar (2), piano (3, 6, 9), keyboards (3, 7, 10), 12-string guitar (5), Nashville guitar (7, 8), harmonium (9)
- Sammy Witte – programming (tracks 1–4, 6–8, 10, 12), piano (1–4, 7, 10, 11), keyboards (1–3, 5–10, 12), Moog bass (1, 3, 6–10, 12), background vocals (1, 7, 12), acoustic guitar (3–5), electric guitar (3, 9); percussion, xylophone (3); bass guitar (4, 12), Mellotron (4); Hammond organ, Wurlitzer piano (7); harmonium (9); drums, B3 organ, drum programming (12)
- Aaron Sterling – drums (tracks 1–3, 7, 9), percussion (7)
- Zachary Dawes – bass guitar (tracks 1–3, 7, 12), double bass (7)
- Sierra Deaton – background vocals (tracks 1, 2, 5, 10, 12)
- Rob Moose – strings (tracks 1, 6, 12)
- Gabriel Cabezas – cello (tracks 1, 6, 12)
- Jason Goldstein – piano (tracks 1, 8, 12), trumpet (12)
- John Hill – bass guitar, keyboards (tracks 5, 9); electric guitar (5), piano (9)
- François Comtois – drums (track 5)

Technical

- Sammy Witte – production, engineering
- John Hill – production (tracks 5, 9)
- Luke Hemmings – production (tracks 10, 11), engineering (10)
- Randy Merrill – mastering
- Mark "Spike" Stent – mixing (tracks 1, 3–5, 9)
- Michael Freeman – mixing (tracks 2, 6–8, 10–12)
- Kevin Smith – engineering (tracks 1–3, 5, 7–9, 12)
- Rob Cohen – engineering (tracks 5, 9)
- Aaron Sterling – engineering (track 9)
- Rob Moose – string engineering, string arrangement (tracks 1, 6, 12)
- Matt Wolach – mixing assistance (tracks 1, 3–5, 9)
- Taylor Jackson – engineering assistance (tracks 1–3, 5, 7–9, 12)
- Kaushlesh "Garry" Purohit – engineering assistance (tracks 1–3, 7, 12)
- Chloe Poswillo – engineering assistance (tracks 1, 2, 7)

Visuals

- Luke Hemmings – creative direction
- Vladimir Sepetov – creative direction, design, packaging
- Scottie Cameron – photography
- Elizabeth A. Miranda – photography

== Charts ==
Chart performance for When Facing the Things We Turn Away From
Chart (2021)	Peak position
Australian Albums (ARIA)	1
Belgian Albums (Ultratop Flanders)	141
Dutch Albums (Album Top 100)	64
New Zealand Albums (RMNZ)	33
Polish Albums (ZPAV)	16
Scottish Albums (OCC)	13
UK Albums (OCC)	51
US Billboard 200	124
US Heatseekers Albums (Billboard)	1
US Top Alternative Albums (Billboard)	10
US Top Rock Albums (Billboard)	17
