= Eyelid Movies =

2010 studio album by Phantogram

Studio album by Phantogram
- Released: 9 February 2010
- Length: 44:27
- Label: Barsuk
- Producer: Phantogram

Phantogram chronology
Eyelid Movies (2010)	Nightlife (2011)

Eyelid Movies is the debut studio album by American electronic music duo Phantogram, released on 9 February 2010 by Barsuk Records. Barsuk Records reissued the album with previously unreleased songs on 11 November 2022.

== Reception ==
Professional ratings
Aggregate scores
Source	Rating
Metacritic	76/100
Review scores
Source	Rating
Spin	4/5 stars
AllMusic	3.5/5 stars
The A.V. Club	B+
Pitchfork	7.5/10
BBC Music	favorable
PopMatters	7/10
Slant Magazine	3/5 stars

The album was generally well received, retaining a rating of 76 out of 100 on the review aggregating site Metacritic based on 13 reviews. Absolute Punk gave a favorable review, stating, "Phantogram have put forth a collection of heady and stimulating songs primed for in-the-dark listening." However, another review from Prefix magazine gave it a 5.5 out of 10, recognizing the band's potential for making good music, but saying that the debut was "something of a stumble out of the gate." BBC Music gave it an 8 out of 10.

== Track listing ==
=== Standard edition ===
Standard edition
No.	Title	Length
1.	"Mouthful of Diamonds"	4:13
2.	"When I'm Small"	4:09
3.	"Turn It Off"	4:01
4.	"Running from the Cops"	3:57
5.	"All Dried Up"	3:46
6.	"As Far as I Can See"	3:29
7.	"You Are the Ocean"	5:49
8.	"Bloody Palms"	3:31
9.	"Futuristic Casket"	3:37
10.	"Let Me Go"	4:25
11.	"10,000 Claps"	3:30
Total length:		44:27

=== 2022 expanded edition ===
Eyelid Movies – 2022 expanded edition (bonus disc)
No.	Title	Length
1.	"Suzie"	3:40
2.	"Shotgun Smiles"	3:19
3.	"Voices"	4:01
4.	"Walk Down"	3:55
5.	"Make a Fist (Alternate Version)"	4:14
6.	"When I'm Small (Lucy's Mix)"	4:25
7.	"Voices (Live on WEXT)"	4:05
8.	"Running from the Cops (Instrumental)"	3:57
9.	"Mouthful of Diamonds (Instrumental)"	4:11
10.	"Futuristic Casket (Instrumental)"	3:37
11.	"10,000 Claps (Instrumental)"	3:30
12.	"You Are the Ocean (Instrumental)"	5:50
13.	"When I'm Small (RAC Remix)"	4:00
14.	"Mouthful of Diamonds (Michna Remix)"	5:08
15.	"When I'm Small (Chuck Brody Remix)"	4:57
16.	"Mouthful of Diamonds (Alan Wilkis Remix)"	3:19
Total length:		1:05:08
