= Florence Road =

Irish rock band

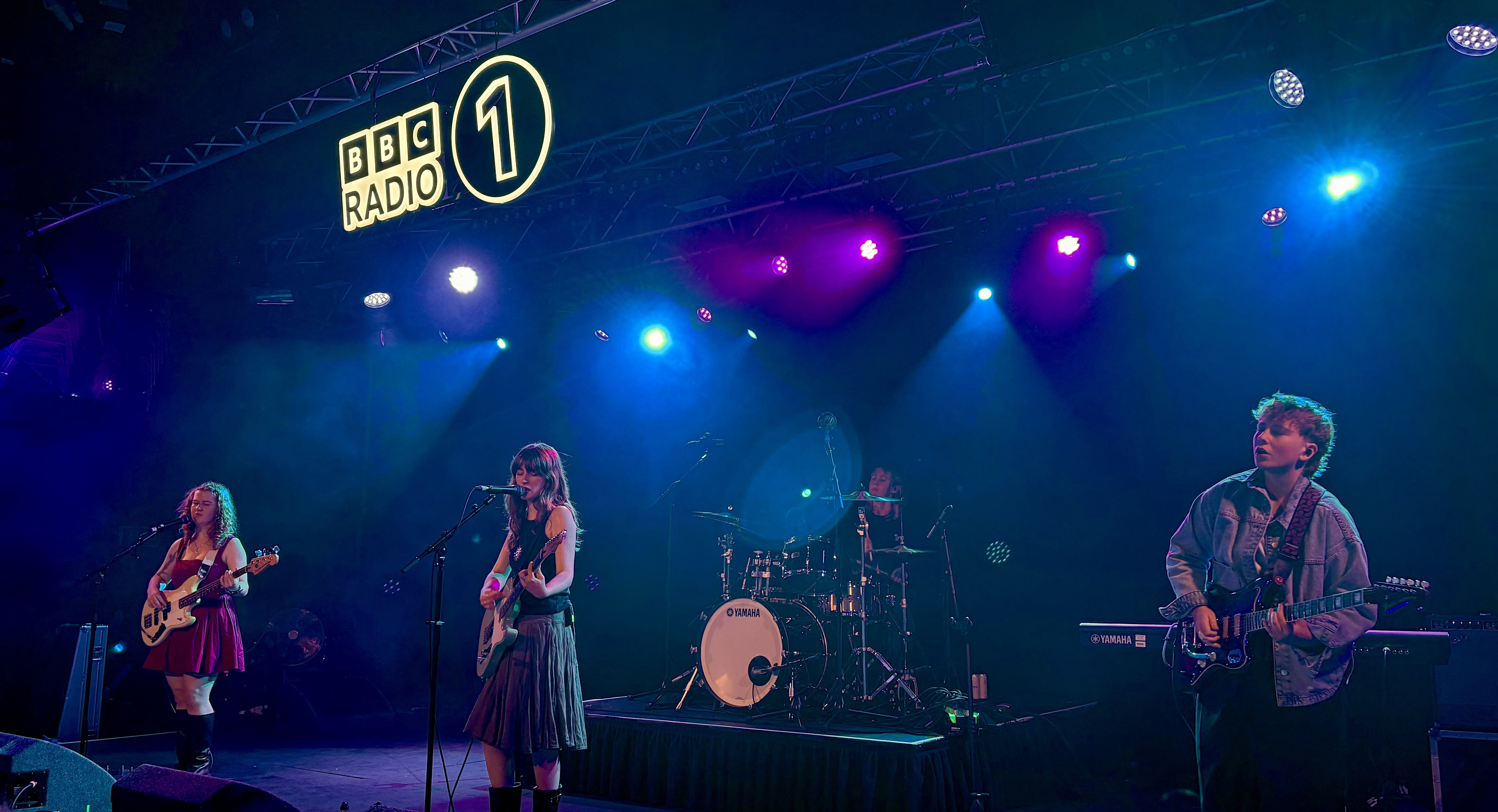
- Florence Road performing in Cardiff, 2025.

Background information
- Origin: Bray, County Wicklow, Ireland
- Genres: Indie rock; alternative rock; grunge pop
- Years active: 2019–present
- Label: Warner
- Members: Lily Aron; Emma Brandon; Ailbhe Barry; Hannah Kelly

Florence Road are an Irish rock band formed in Bray, County Wicklow in 2019. The group consists of lead singer and guitarist Lily Aron, guitarist Emma Brandon, bassist Ailbhe Barry and drummer Hannah Kelly. They gained recognition in 2025 following the release of their single, "Heavy", but had built a platform on TikTok prior to this by covering music from other artists. The band signed to Warner Records and Warner Chappell Music.

== History ==
=== Formation and early years ===
Florence Road was formed by four childhood friends in Bray, County Wicklow. The members began writing and performing music together in a garden shed and initially attracted attention through fisheye lens performance videos shared on social media.

=== Fall Back and rise (2025) ===
In March 2025, the band released their single "Heavy", co-written with Marshall Vore and John Hill. The track received favourable reviews and a notable endorsement from American singer Olivia Rodrigo, increasing its streaming popularity. Their second single, "Caterpillar", produced by Dan Nigro, followed in April 2025. It was praised for its acoustic instrumentation and its lyrical exploration of anxiety and personal transformation. In June 2025, Florence Road released their debut mixtape, Fall Back, preceded by the single "Figure It Out".

Shortly after completing school, Florence Road signed a publishing deal with Warner Chappell Music and a recording contract with Warner Records. The band supported Olivia Rodrigo during selected dates of her Guts World Tour, including performances at Marlay Park in Dublin and BST Hyde Park in London. In June 2025, the band toured with Sombr briefly; performing in Cologne, London and two different Amsterdam locations. In November, they supported Wolf Alice on a European tour. In 2026, they supported The Last Dinner Party on their North American tour.

== Discography ==
=== Mixtapes ===
List of mixtapes, with selected details and chart positions
Title	Details	Peak chart positions
Title	Details	IRE
Fall Back	Released: 20 June 2025; Label: Warner; Format: Digital download, streaming	97

=== Extended plays ===
List of EPs, with selected details
Title	Details
Spring Forward	Released: 27 March 2026; Label: Warner; Format: Digital download, streaming

=== Singles ===
List of singles, showing year released and album name
Title	Year	Peak chart positions			Album
Title	Year	IRE	JPN Hot	NZ Hot	Album
"Another Seventeen"	2022	—	—	—	Non-album single
"Heavy"	2025	—	—	—	Fall Back
"Caterpillar"	2025	—	—	—	Fall Back
"Figure It Out"	2025	—	—	—	Fall Back
"Break the Girl"	2025	—	—	—	Fall Back
"Miss"	2025	—	—	—	Spring Forward
"Storm Warnings"	2025	—	—	—	Spring Forward
"Rabbits Can Swim"	2026	—	—	—	Spring Forward
"Hanging Out to Dry"	2026	48	97	27	Spring Forward
"7563"	2026	—	—	—	TBA
"No Better Woman"	2026	—	—	—	TBA
"Wish Upon You"	2026	—	12	35	TBA

== Awards and nominations ==
Organisation	Year	Work	Category	Result
BBC Radio 1	2026	Florence Road	Sound of 2026	Nominated

== Tours ==
Supporting

- Olivia Rodrigo – Guts World Tour (2025)
- The Last Dinner Party – From The Pyre Tour (2026)
- Fontaines D.C - dopamine chamber tour (2027)
