= Phantogram (band) =

American electronic rock duo

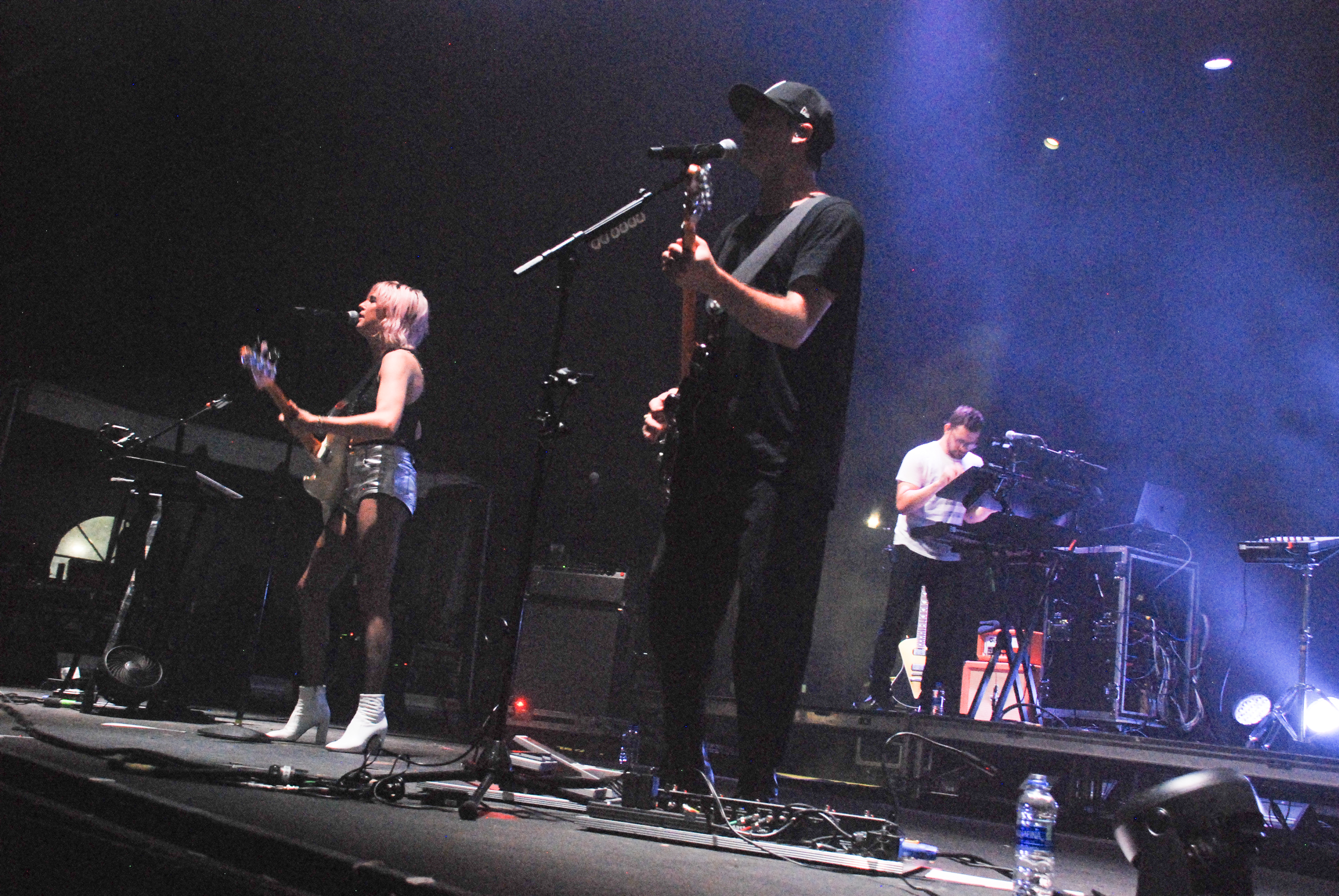
- Phantogram at Hopscotch Music Festival in 2019

Background information
- Also known as: Charlie Everywhere (2007–2009)
- Origin: Greenwich, New York, U.S.
- Genres: Electronic rock; dream pop; electronica; trip hop; psychedelic pop
- Years active: 2007–present
- Labels: Sub-Bombin; CE; BBE; Barsuk; Indica; Ghostly; Republic
- Members: Sarah Barthel; Josh Carter
- Website: phantogram.com

Phantogram is an American music duo from Greenwich, New York, formed in 2007 and consisting of multi-instrumentalists and vocalists Sarah Barthel (Note: (/'bɑɹ.θɛl/ BAR-thel)) and Josh Carter. Since 2009, the band has released five studio albums, four EPs, and numerous singles. Their third album, Three, reached top 10 on Billboard 200, while singles "Fall in Love" and "You Don't Get Me High Anymore" made top 10 on US Alternative.

The group have toured with the Antlers, Beach House, Linkin Park, Metric, Minus the Bear, Caribou, Zero 7, the xx, Ra Ra Riot, School of Seven Bells, Yeasayer, Muse, Brazilian Girls, Bob Moses, Future Islands, the Glitch Mob, and Two Door Cinema Club.

== History ==
Carter and Barthel have been friends since preschool. Dissatisfied with pursuing a visual arts degree at Champlain College in Vermont, Barthel returned home in 2007 and reconnected with Carter after he returned from a brief stint in New York City with Grand Habit, an experimental band formed with his older brother, John. The two worked on finishing some of Carter's earlier songwriting ideas and formed the band, Charlie Everywhere. They played some live shows, but decided to focus the bulk of their energies on making records.

The duo originally chose the name Charlie Everywhere and performed around the Saratoga Springs, New York area. They released two EPs on local label Sub-Bombin Records. After signing with UK label Barely Breaking Even (BBE) on January 26, 2009, they changed their name to Phantogram. Carter suggested the name Phantogram when the band wanted to switch from Charlie Everywhere to "something [they] liked". Upon looking up phantogram, they found that it referred to an optical illusion in which two-dimensional images appear to be three-dimensional, and noted parallels between this meaning and their band and music.

An eponymous debut EP was self-released on the CE Records label on May 12, 2009, followed in the same year by another EP, Running From the Cops, issued on BBE. After encouragement from Erich Cannon of Portland's Spectre Entertainment, who heard songs on their MySpace page and contacted them, they signed with Barsuk Records in October 2009, "We were going to write the record, finish it, and release it as a demo for upstate," explained Barthel. "Then our plan was to move down to New York [City] to do the whole networking and meeting people kind of stuff. And we kind of skipped that whole thing, just because of the internet."

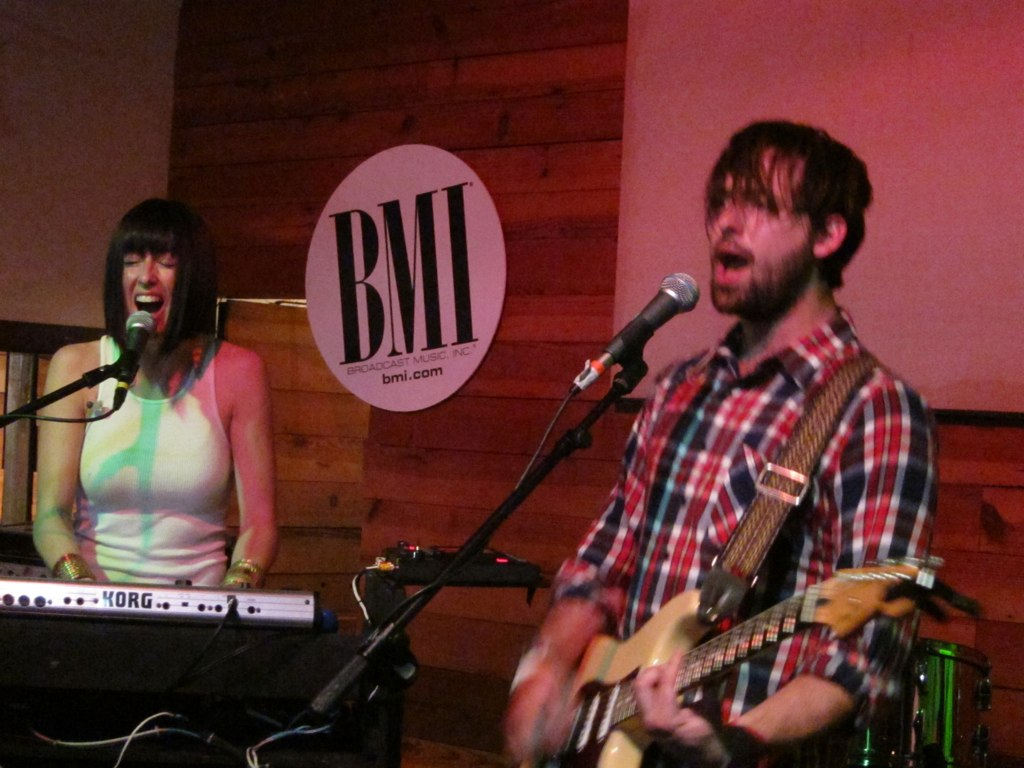
Phantogram in 2010

Phantogram released their debut album, Eyelid Movies, on September 15, 2009, with BBE in Europe and Indica Records in Canada. Barsuk released the album in the United States on February 9, 2010, and it received generally favorable reviews. The album included three singles: "Mouthful of Diamonds", "When I'm Small" and "As Far as I Can See". For tours, they enlisted drummer Tim Oakley, formerly of the Mathematicians (where he played under the name Albert Gorithm IV), starting in 2010.

A new EP, Nightlife, was released on November 1, 2011, which included the single "Don't Move". The following year, the duo collaborated with Big Boi from OutKast on three songs ("Objectum Sexuality", "CPU" and "Lines") from his second studio album, Vicious Lies and Dangerous Rumors, released in December 2012, and were credited as producers for the song "Objectum Sexuality". Phantogram were also featured on the Flaming Lips song "You Lust" from their 2013 album The Terror.

Nicholas Shelestak, a guitarist/synth player, was added to the touring band in 2013, while Chris Carhart replaced Oakley on drums. They opened for M83 at the Hollywood Bowl on September 22, 2013. Republic Records released the Phantogram EP, along with the single "Black Out Days", on September 30, 2013. The band's second studio album, Voices, followed on February 18, 2014, by Barsuk/Republic, which included the singles "Bill Murray", "Fall in Love", and "Nothing But Trouble".

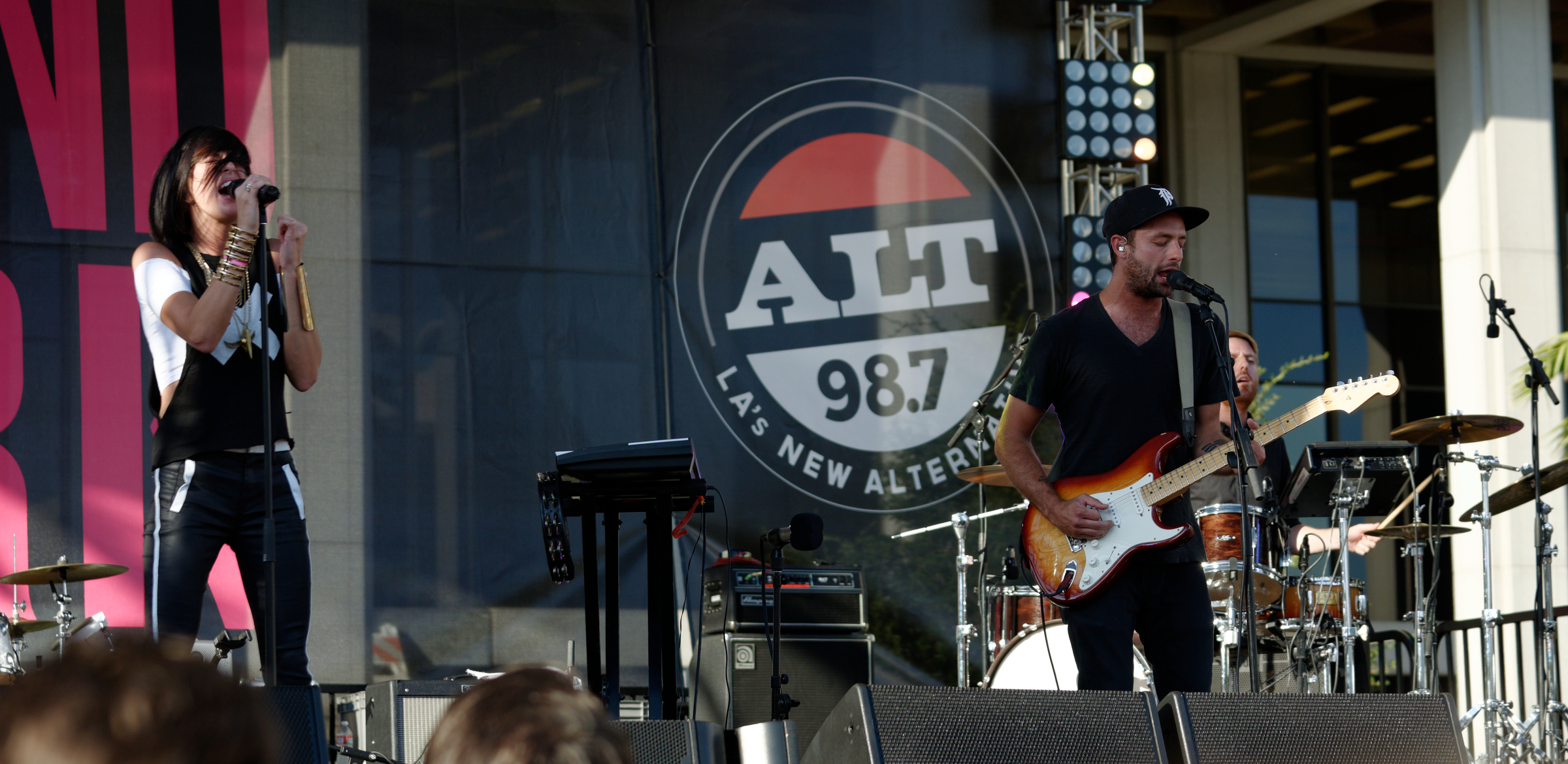
Phantogram in 2014

The band opened for Alt-J at Madison Square Garden on March 30, 2015. They contributed the song "K.Y.S.A" to the Grand Theft Auto V soundtrack in 2015; the track appeared in "The Lab" radio station, and was also included on the digital and physical versions of the Welcome to Los Santos album. The same year, Phantogram collaborated with Big Boi again, resulting in the seven-song EP Big Grams, released on September 25, 2015, by Epic Records. The EP featured production work from Big Boi, Phantogram, 9th Wonder and Skrillex. Barthel also guest-appeared on the Miley Cyrus song "Slab of Butter (Scorpion)" from her album Miley Cyrus & Her Dead Petz. They toured the West Coast with Muse in December, and again during the European leg of the Drones World Tour the following April.

Both members suffered when Barthel's sister, Becky, took her own life in January 2016. The loss greatly impacted the duo, and influenced their third album, Three. The record was released October 7, 2016 by Republic, and debuted at No. 5 on the Billboard Top Album Sales chart and No. 9 on the Billboard 200. It included the singles "You Don't Get Me High Anymore", "Run Run Blood", "Cruel World" and "Same Old Blues". Phantogram performed at the summer 2017 WayHome Music & Arts Festival in Oro-Medonte, Ontario. A single, "Someday", was released on May 18, 2018, backed by a cover of Sparklehorse's "Saturday"; all proceeds from the single were earmarked for donation to the American Foundation for Suicide Prevention in memory of Barthel's sister.

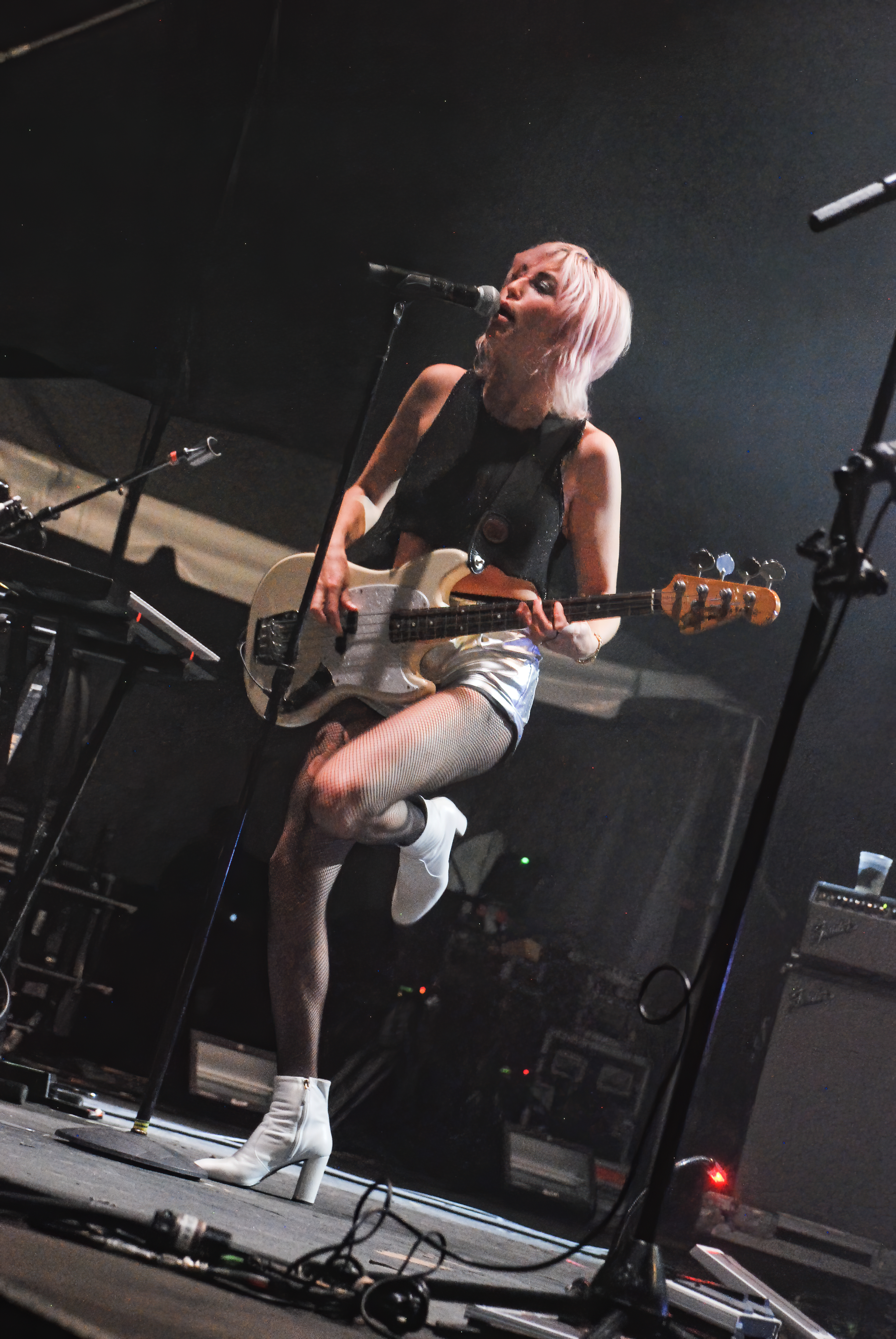
Sarah Barthel playing the bass guitar during a live performance in 2019.

Ceremony, the band's fourth studio album, was released on March 6, 2020. The following October, they contributed a cover of Joe Cocker's song "You Are So Beautiful" to the compilation Good Music to Avert the Collapse of American Democracy, Volume 2, which was available for purchase for only 24 hours and whose proceeds went toward Voting Rights Lab, an organization dedicated to the protection of Americans' voting rights. Later in the same month, they released the single "Me & Me", accompanying the Netflix film A Babysitter's Guide to Monster Hunting. Tom Morello featured the band on his song "Driving to Texas", from the 2021 album The Atlas Underground Fire.

A reissue of Eyelid Movies was announced in 2022 and they released the song "Suzie", an outtake from the recording sessions of Eyelid Movies, as an accompanying single. The duo's fifth studio album, Memory of a Day, was released on October 18, 2024, which included singles "All a Mystery," "Happy Again," "Come Alive," and "It Wasn't Meant to Be."

== Style and influences ==
Phantogram originally wrote and recorded in a remote barn in upstate New York called Harmonie Lodge, before moving to the Los Angeles area. They now record at Harmonie West and have a house in Laurel Canyon, California.

Carter and Barthel define their music as electronic rock, dream pop, electronica and trip hop, and have described their sound as "street beat, psych pop". According to Carter, their music has "lots of rhythms, swirling guitars, spacey keyboards, echoes, airy vocals".

The band were inspired by numerous artists including the Beatles, David Bowie, Cocteau Twins, Sparklehorse, J Dilla, the Flaming Lips, John Frusciante, Serge Gainsbourg, Madlib, Sonic Youth, Yes, Kevin Shields, and Prince.

== Live performances ==
Phantogram's live performances extend the duo's studio work into a fuller multi-instrumental production, combining electronic elements with live drums, synthesizers, guitar, and layered vocals. Since 2013, Sarah Barthel and Josh Carter have been joined in their live shows by touring drummer Chris Carhart. His hybrid acoustic–electronic setup—which incorporates triggers, pads, and click-track integration—supports the recreation of the band's rhythmic textures in a concert setting. In a 2018 interview with Modern Drummer, Carhart discussed adapting his background to the technologically focused demands of Phantogram's stage production.

Reviews of Phantogram's 2024 sold-out performance at Higher Ground in Burlington, Vermont, noted the band's energetic presentation and included Barthel's reflections on their early years performing in the city before achieving broader recognition.

Across their 2024–2025 tours, the band performed material from Memory of a Day alongside earlier songs such as "Black Out Days" and "Don’t Move." Live reviews frequently describe the interplay between the electronic components of Phantogram's sound and the instrumentation provided by their touring ensemble, which helps translate the duo's studio arrangements to a concert setting.

== Members ==
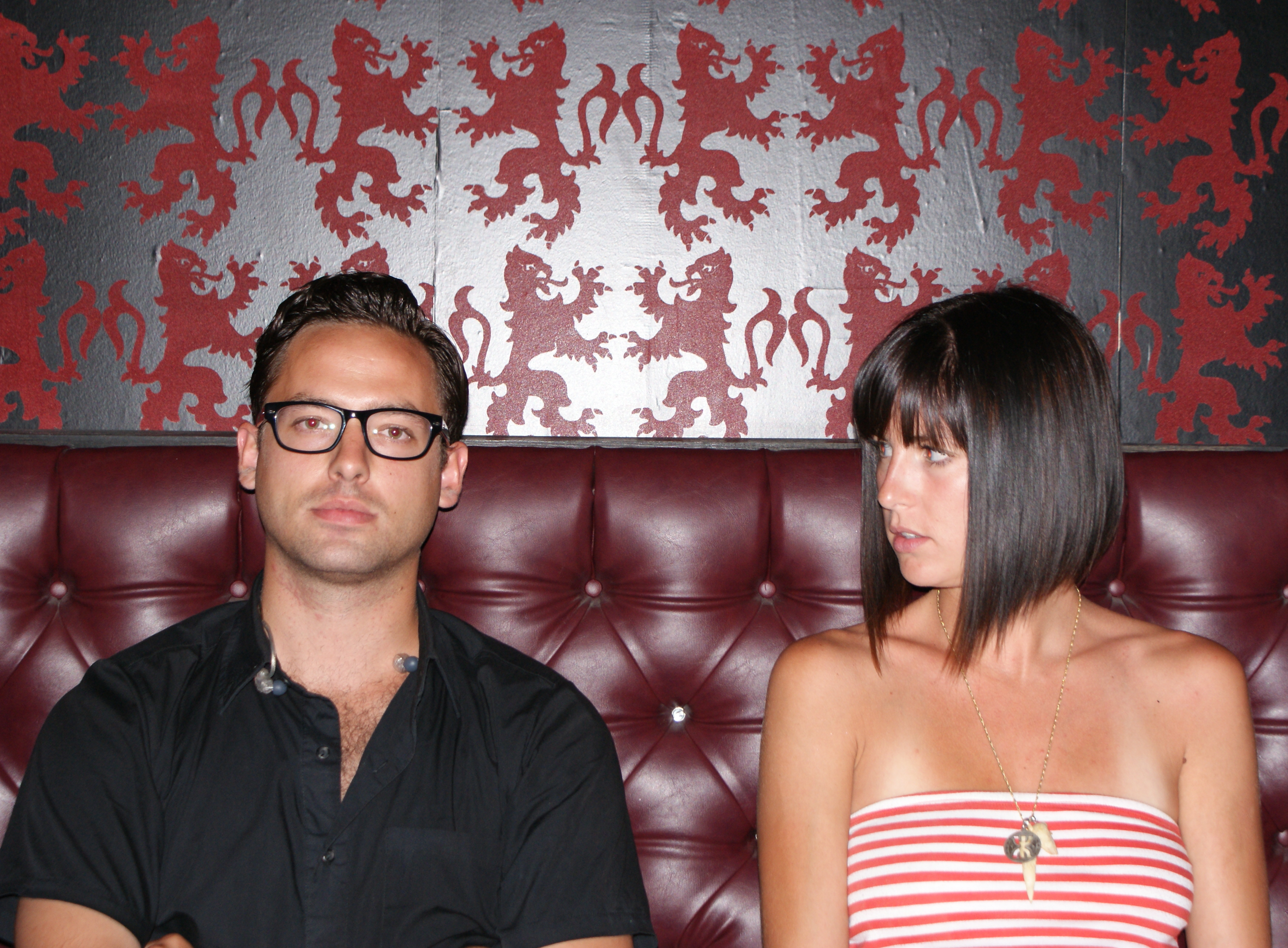
Carter and Barthel in 2010

Current members

- Sarah Barthel – vocals, keyboards, piano, programming, synthesizers, guitars, production (2007–present)
- Josh Carter – vocals, guitars, programming, synthesizers, drums, percussion, production (2007–present)

== Discography ==
=== Studio albums ===
- Eyelid Movies (2010)
- Voices (2014)
- Three (2016)
- Ceremony (2019)
- Memory of a Day (2024)

=== EPs ===
- Nightlife (2011)

=== As Big Grams ===
- Big Grams with Big Boi (2015)
