= Ceremony (Phantogram album) =

2019 studio album by Phantogram

Studio album by Phantogram
- Released: March 6, 2020
- Studios: Harmony West & SoundEQ, Los Angeles
- Length: 37:27
- Label: Republic
- Producers: Andrew Dawson; Boots; Josh Carter; Sarah Barthel

Phantogram chronology
Three (2016)	Ceremony (2020)	Memory of a Day (2024)

Singles from Ceremony
- 1. "Into Happiness" Released: May 31, 2019; 2. "Mister Impossible" Released: August 9, 2019; 3. "In a Spiral" Released: October 9, 2019; 4. "Pedestal" Released: February 7, 2020; 5. "Dear God" Released: March 6, 2020

Professional ratings
Aggregate scores
Source	Rating
Metacritic	67/100
Review scores
Source	Rating
AllMusic	3.5/5 stars
American Songwriter	4/5 stars
DIY	4/5 stars
Exclaim!	4/10
Paste	6.8/10
Pitchfork	5.9/10

Ceremony is the fourth studio album by American electronic rock duo Phantogram. The album was released by Republic Records on March 6, 2020. Its first single, "Into Happiness", released on May 31, 2019, reached number 21 on the Billboard Alternative Songs chart.

== Track listing ==
Ceremony track listing
No.	Title	Writer(s)	Producer(s)	Length
1.	"Dear God"	Boots; Dana Travis Middleton; Jeffrey V. Smith; Josh Carter; Sarah Barthel	Andrew Dawson; Boots; Carter; Barthel	3:28
2.	"In a Spiral"	Amanda Lucille Warner; Asa Taccone; Boots; Ennio Morricone; Joseph Robert Janiak; Carter; Peter Wade Keusch; Barthel	Dawson; Boots; Derek Dunivan; Carter; Barthel	3:23
3.	"Into Happiness"	Boots; Carter; Barthel; William Corgan	Dawson; Boots; Carter	3:21
4.	"Pedestal"	Warner; Boots; Carter; Barthel	Dawson; Boots; Carter; Barthel	3:11
5.	"Love Me Now"	Boots; Dan Wilson; Henry Brill; Carter; Barthel; Thom Bell; William Hart; Corgan	Dawson; Boots; Carter; Barthel	2:54
6.	"Let Me Down"	Boots; George Young; Harry Vanda; Carter; Barthel	Dawson; Boots; Carter; Matt Jacobson; Barthel	3:29
7.	"News Today"	Adrian Younge; Ali Shaheed Muhammad; Carter; Karolina Acratz; Loren Oden; Barthel	Boots; Carter	2:00
8.	"Mister Impossible"	Boots; John Scott; Carter; Barthel; Terrance Cole	Dawson; Boots; Carter; Barthel	3:36
9.	"Glowing"	Boots; Wilson; Carter; Barthel; Ólafur Arnalds	Dawson; Boots; Carter; Barthel	3:23
10.	"Gaunt Kids"	Boots; Wilson; Carter; Barthel; Terius Youngdell Nash	Dawson; Boots; Carter; Barthel	3:05
11.	"Ceremony"	Boots; Jimmy Ledrac; Carter; Morgan Kibby; Barthel	Dawson; Boots; Carter	5:37
Total length:				37:27

== Charts ==
Ceremony chart performance
Chart (2020)	Peak position
US Billboard 200	75
US Top Alternative Albums (Billboard)	5
US Top Rock Albums (Billboard)	8
US Indie Store Album Sales (Billboard)	14
