= Christian Leave =

American musician

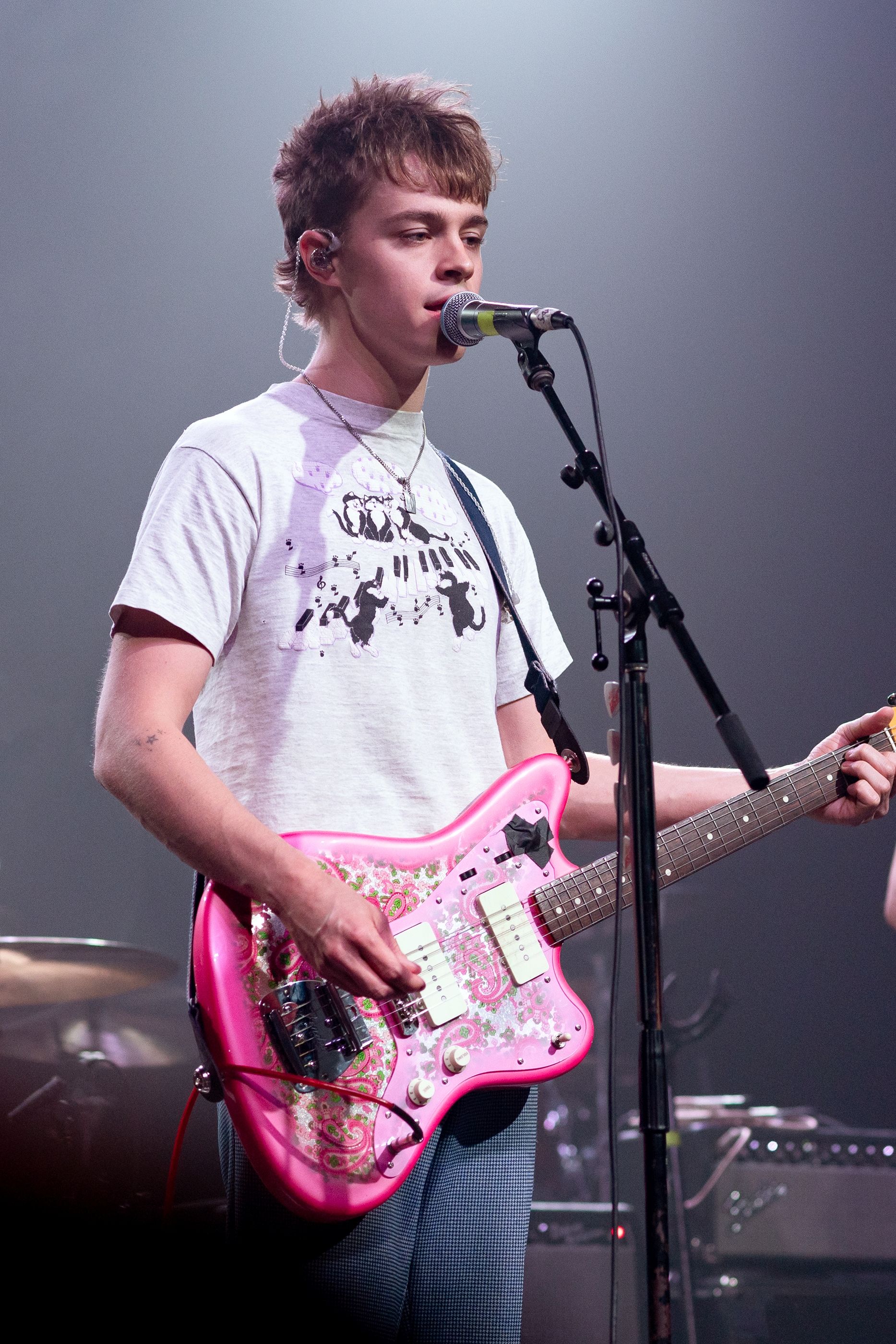
- Christian Leave at The Fonda Theatre in 2021

Background information
- Born: May 1, 2000 (age 25); Texas, United States
- Genres: Indie pop; dream pop
- Occupation: Singer-songwriter
- Instruments: Vocals; guitar; bass
- Years active: 2015–present
- Labels: Godmode, Warner Records
- Website: Official website

Christian Akridge (born May 1, 2000) is an American singer-songwriter, musician and multi-instrumentalist. He was born and raised in Wichita Falls, Texas. He fronts a band after his social media username, Christian Leave.

== Early life and career ==
Coming from a religious family, Leave's father was a church pastor and he was raised into the church's music as his grandparents sang on the group Singing Gadberry's. He also began as a helping church bassist player, which according to Leave, was the first time he was introduced to playing music. Before writing or playing music, Leave joined the short video app Vine in 2014, at the age of 14. He gained more than 800,000 followers. On Vine, he became one of the most popular Viners, having obtained around 6 million views and was invited to tour on the event PressPlay, created by David Graham. After the social media app discontinuation around 2015, Leave started working on his music career writing songs and recorded his first EP Hope released on July 1, 2016. The EP debuted on number 48 of Billboards Independent Albums on July 23, 2016. Around 2017, Leave started posting covers on YouTube and gain popularity outside the social media apps, that lead him to self-release an album Heartbreak Room on January 30, 2018. With the social media attention for his works started to gain more followers, Leave was reached by Warner Records and signed with the label Godmode with his single release "Never" and the later EP Trilogy on December 14, 2018. Following, he released a series of singles and EPs that culminated on the single "Adult" released on July 24, 2020.

On February 12, 2021, Leave released his EP Heavy Hitting Hurts My Head, and later on October 29, 2021, the EP Days Like Lost Dogs with the release of a music video with the same name.

== Discography ==
=== Studio albums ===
- Heartbreak Room (2019)

=== EPs ===
- Hope (2016)
- Trilogy (2018)
- Heavy Hitting Hurts My Head (2021)
- Days Like Lost Dogs (2021)
- Superstar (2022)
