= Voting Rights Lab =

U.S. voting research organization

- Founded: 2017
- Type: Nonprofit
- Key people: Samantha Tarazi (CEO and co-founder)
- Website: votingrightslab.org

Voting Rights Lab is a nonpartisan 501(c)(3) nonprofit organization that tracks election legislation and supports expanding access to voting.

As the 2020 election results came in, Voting Rights Lab and IntoAction produced memes and graphics that were viewed over 1 billion times, urging every vote to be counted. The organization monitors laws such as the passing of protections for election workers and rules whose stated intent is to prevent noncitizen voting. The group has tracked 700 new election laws throughout the US between 2020 and 2024 and has continued tracking legislation into 2026. The group also groups laws into categories such as 'expand voting rights' and 'restrict voting rights' and publishes a tracker of voter ID requirements in different states. The organization put together a summary of election rule changes in the seven swing states ahead of the 2024 presidential election. They found that Michigan and Nevada expanded access to voting, Arizona and Pennsylvania were mixed, and Georgia, North Carolina and Wisconsin restricted voting access. The organization also ran an ad campaign as well as submitting op-eds in local papers during the 2024 election season in key counties in swing states with messages trying to bolster confidence in local elections. In 2025, the Voting Rights Lab also analyzed how many Americans have passports, estimating that 43% of Americans had one.

In October 2020, a number of musicians including R.E.M., Phoebe Bridgers, and Hayley Williams helped raised money for Voting Rights Lab by releasing compilation albums on Bandcamp.

== See also ==
- ACLU
- Brennan Center for Justice
- Cost of Voting Index
- League of Women Voters
- National Conference of State Legislatures
- Votebeat
