= Fall Back (mixtape) =

Mixtape by Florence Road
- Released: 20 June 2025
- Recorded: 2024–2025
- Genres: Indie rock; alternative rock
- Length: 16:33
- Label: Warner
- Producers: Luca Caruso; John Hill; Ryan Linvill; Dan Nigro; Jamie Rendle; Dan Wilson

Singles from Fall Back
- 1. "Heavy" Released: 14 March 2025; 2. "Caterpillar" Released: 23 April 2025; 3. "Figure It Out" Released: 16 May 2025; 4. "Break the Girl" Released: 1 September 2025

Fall Back is the debut mixtape by Irish indie rock quartet Florence Road, consisting of Wicklow-based Lily Aron, Ailbhe Barry, Emma Brandon and Hannah Kelly. It was released on 20 June 2025 via Warner Records. The mixtape was preceded by previously released singles, "Heavy", "Catterpillar", and "Figure It Out".

== Background ==
Consisting of five tracks each with a length of approximately three minutes, with a total runtime of sixteen minutes and thirty-three seconds, the mixtape features production contributions from Dan Nigro, Dan Wilson, and John Hill.

The first single, "Heavy", was released on 14 March 2025. It was followed by the second single, "Caterpillar", on 23 April 2025, and the third single, "Figure It Out", on 16 May 2025.

== Reception ==
Professional ratings
Review scores
Source	Rating
Clash	7/10 stars
DIY	4/5 stars
Dork	5/5 stars

The mixtape received a five-out-of-five rating from Dork, which described it as "basically perfection". DIY gave it a four-star rating and noted, "There are moments where their sound still shows its youth, but there's no doubt that Florence Road are teetering on the edge of something truly brilliant. The ambition in their sound speaks for itself". Clash gave it a rating score of seven, stating "the freshness and whimsy of their debut mixtape hints that their future output will characteristically be their own".

== Track listing ==
Fall Back track listing
No.	Title	Writer(s)	Producer(s)	Length
1.	"Hand Me Downs"	Lily Aron; Ailbhe Barry; Emma Brandon; Hannah Kelly; Dan Wilson	Wilson; Sara Mulford^{[a]}	3:14
2.	"Goodnight"	Aron; Barry; Jamie Rendle	Rendle	3:13
3.	"Caterpillar"	Aron; Rendle	Dan Nigro; Ryan Linvill	3:37
4.	"Figure It Out"	Aron; Barry; Brandon; Kelly	Luca Caruso	3:09
5.	"Heavy"	Aron; Kelly; John Hill; Marshall Vore	Hill	3:20
Total length:				16:33

Reissue track listing
No.	Title	Writer(s)	Producer(s)	Length
1.	"Break the Girl"	Lily Aron; Ailbhe Barry; Jamie Rendle	Rendle	3:31
2.	"Hand Me Downs"	Aron; Barry; Emma Brandon; Hannah Kelly; Dan Wilson	Wilson; Sara Mulford^{[a]}	3:14
3.	"Goodnight"	Aron; Barry; Rendle	Rendle	3:13
4.	"Caterpillar"	Aron; Rendle	Dan Nigro; Ryan Linvill	3:37
5.	"Figure It Out"	Aron; Barry; Brandon; Kelly	Luca Caruso	3:09
6.	"Heavy"	Aron; Kelly; John Hill; Marshall Vore	Hill	3:20
Total length:				20:06

=== Note ===
- ^{^[a]} signifies an additional producer

== Personnel ==
Credits adapted from Tidal.

=== Florence Road ===
- Lily Aron – vocals (all tracks), guitars (all tracks), backing vocals (3)
- Ailbhe Barry – bass (all tracks), backing vocals (1, 2)
- Emma Brandon – guitars
- Hannah Kelly – drums (1, 2, 4), piano (3), guitars (5)

=== Additional contributors ===
- Randy Merrill – mastering
- Craig Silvey – mixing (1, 5)
- Sara Mulford – engineering (1)
- Dani Spragg – mixing assistance (1, 5)
- Matt Wolach – mixing assistance (1)
- Joe McGrath – engineering (2, 4)
- Jamie Rendle – backing vocals, bass, drum programming, electric guitar, synthesizer programming (2)
- Mark "Spike" Stent – mixing (2)
- Kieron Beardmore – mixing assistance (2)
- Daniel Nigro – acoustic guitar, backing vocals, bass, electric guitar, Mellotron, piano, engineering (3)
- Ryan Linvill – acoustic guitar, bass, electric guitar, piano, synthesizer, engineering (3)
- Clio Tighe – backing vocals (3)
- Paul Cartwright – violin (3)
- Mitch McCarthy – mixing (3)
- Luca Caruso – mixing (4)
- Marshall Vore – drums, piano (5)
- John Hill – bass (5)
- Andy Petr – engineering (5)
- Jimmy Keeley – engineering (5)
- Yeston – engineering (5)
