= Nightlife (Phantogram EP) =

EP by Phantogram
- Released: 1 November 2011
- Genres: Electronic rock, indie pop, trip hop
- Length: 27:19
- Label: Barsuk

Phantogram chronology
Eyelid Movies (2010)	Nightlife (2011)	Voices (2014)

Professional ratings
Aggregate scores
Source	Rating
Metacritic	69/100
Review scores
Source	Rating
Paste	(7.8/10)
AllMusic	3/5 stars
Pitchfork	7.1/10
Absolute Punk	80/100

Nightlife is the third EP by American electronic rock band Phantogram, released November 1, 2011, by Barsuk Records. It was also sold at their shows before the official release date. The first single from the album, "Don't Move", was debuted October 5, 2011 by Pitchfork. They released the album for full streaming on their Facebook page on October 18.

== Track listing ==
1. "16 Years" – 3:56
2. "Don't Move" – 4:18
3. "Turning Into Stone" – 4:54
4. "Make a Fist" – 4:36
5. "Nightlife" – 4:06
6. "A Dark Tunnel" – 5:29
