= You Don't Get Me High Anymore =

Single by Phantogram

from the album Three
- B-side: "Same Old Blues"
- Released: June 16, 2016
- Genre: Pop; synth-rock
- Length: 3:40
- Label: Republic
- Songwriters: Ricky Reed; Josh Carter; Sarah Barthel; Dan Wilson; Edwin J. Bocage; Alfred Scramuzza
- Producers: Carter; Reed

Phantogram singles chronology
"Black Out Days" (2014)	"You Don't Get Me High Anymore" (2016)	"Run Run Blood" (2016)

Music video
- "You Don't Get Me High Anymore" on YouTube

"You Don't Get Me High Anymore" is a song by American electronic rock duo Phantogram. It was released on June 16, 2016, as the lead single from their third studio album, Three. Written by Eric Frederic, Josh Carter, Sarah Barthel, Dan Wilson, Edwin J. Bocage and Alfred Scramuzza, the song found commercial success, charting on the US Hot Rock & Alternative Songs and Canada Rock charts, peaking at number 19 and number 18 respectively. A music video for the single premiered on July 21, 2016.

== Background and release ==
Phantogram began teasing a new single for their third studio album, Three, on their website in May 2016, posting a black and white clip of Sarah Barthel singing the lyrics of the new song. The title of single was revealed to be "You Don't Get Me High Anymore", with a countdown clock indicating that the song would be released on June 16, 2016. On June 15, the song premeried on air on Zane Lowe's Beats 1 show. Josh Carter stated that the song is about, "the loneliness in superficial relationships and that feeling of not being able to find happiness in places that were once so easy to come across." Barthel also added that the track, "taps into this idea of wanting to feel something." The duo released the song as the lead single from the album as they believed it, "set the tone for the rest of the record."

On October 18, 2016, a remix to the song by How To Dress Well was released. On January 12, 2017, A-Trak released a remix to the track, which features Joey Purp of Savemoney.

== Composition ==
"You Don't Get Me High Anymore" was written by Ricky Reed, Josh Carter, Sarah Barthel, Dan Wilson, Edwin J. Bocage and Alfred Scramuzza, while production was handled by Reed and Carter. The song was made in Echo Park in Los Angeles. Musically, Carter described the track as "a new progression of Phantogram," while Barthel called the lyrics, dark and the melodies, emotional. Barthel also explained to Pitchfork how the song came together.

"We started the idea — again, the way we always do is with one of Josh's beats. I grabbed it from him and added some weird shit, and from there we moved it into the studio, where we decided to collaborate with some other people. It turned out to be a really awesome thing and we're really proud of it and really pumped for everyone to hear it."

== Critical reception ==
Professional ratings
Review scores
Source	Rating
PopMatters	8/10 stars

The song was met with positive reviews from music critics. Pryor Stroud of PopMatters described the track as, "Dynamic, subtly sinister, and glazed with both breezy melodics and fuzzed-out synths." He also added, "it's a blistering synth-rock standoff with our culture of outsized desires and uninhibited excess." Gregory Adams of Exclaim! remarked, "The cut rides along on a juicy, near-New Jack Swing-styled drum loop and fuzz-heavy synth lines. Above this, Sarah Barthel tunefully ruminates on teeth-shedding dreams, not being a homebody and taking note that certain parts of her life aren't as potent as they once were." DIY described the song as, "another slab of chopped-up, effortlessly sharp pop." Madeline Roth of MTV called the track, "jarring and slightly chaotic." Katie Bain of Billboard stated, "The track oscillates between a throttling guitar riff evocative of Muse and lyrics about car crashes, staring into the abyss and increased chemical intake."

== Chart performance ==
"You Don't Get Me High Anymore" debuted on the US Hot Rock & Alternative Songs chart at number 27 on the week of July 9, 2016. The song later reached a peak of number 19 on the chart on the week of October 29, 2016. The song also peaked at number six on the US Alternative Airplay chart. The song reached number 18 on the Canada Rock chart. On the Billboard Alternative Airplay 2016 year-end chart, it was ranked at number 21.

== Cover versions ==
In October 2016, Canadian punk rock band PUP performed a cover of the track on Triple J radio in Australia. On November 18, 2016, Canadian rock band Three Days Grace released their cover of the song as a digital single. Drummer Neil Sanderson explained why they chose to cover the song in an interview with Loudwire stating, "Brad started playing the bass line to this Phantogram song. We'd been talking the day before about how much we liked 'You Don't Get Me High Anymore'... [I'm] pretty sure we kept the second or third take, once we learned the arrangement on the fly. We love recording spur of the moment things like this. We think it turned out pretty cool so we decided to share it." In 2019, American singer-songwriter Billie Eilish performed a cover of the song for BBC Radio 1 at Maida Vale Studios. In 2021, American artist Molly Tuttle included a version on her covers EP But I'd Rather Be with You, Too.

== Music video ==
The music video for "You Don't Get Me High Anymore" premiered on July 21, 2016. It was directed by Grant Singer and was shot in June 2016, at Bombay Beach, on the Salton Sea in Southern California. According to Carter, Singer chose the location who, "understood the aesthetic of the song." The video combines visual scenes of gigantic waves, motorbike stunts, BDSM and saturated colourscape of red and blue.

== Track listing ==
Digital download
No.	Title	Length
1.	"You Don't Get Me High Anymore"	3:40

7" vinyl
No.	Title	Length
1.	"You Don't Get Me High Anymore"	3:40
2.	"Same Old Blues"	3:30

== Credits and personnel ==
Credits adapted from Tidal.

Phantogram

- Sarah Barthel – vocals, co-producer
- Josh Carter – vocals, guitar, programming, synthesizer, producer

Additional musicians

- Ricky Reed – programming, guitar, bass guitar, producer
- Dan Wilson – bass guitar, co-producer

Production

- Martin Cooke – assistant engineer
- Robin Florent – assistant mixer
- Nicolas Fournier – assistant engineer
- Chris Galland – assistant mixer
- Jeff Jackson – assistant mixer
- Manny Marroquin – mix engineer
- Ethan Shumaker – recording engineer

== Charts ==
=== Weekly charts ===
Weekly chart performance for "You Don't Get Me High Anymore"
Chart (2016)	Peak position
Canada Rock (Billboard)	18
US Hot Rock & Alternative Songs (Billboard)	19

=== Year-end charts ===
Year-end chart performance for "You Don't Get Me High Anymore"
Chart (2016)	Position
US Alternative Airplay (Billboard)	21

== Release history ==
Release dates and formats for "You Don't Get Me High Anymore"
Region	Date	Format	Version	Label	Ref.
Various	June 16, 2016	Digital download	Original	Republic	
Various	October 10, 2016	Digital download	The Range remix	Republic	
Various	October 18, 2016	Digital download	How to Dress Well remix	Republic	
Various	October 21, 2016	Digital download	Attlas remix	Republic	
Various	October 28, 2016	Digital download	Miami Horror remix	Republic	
Various	January 13, 2017	Digital download	A-Trak remix	Republic	
