= Three (Phantogram album) =

2016 studio album by Phantogram

Studio album by Phantogram
- Released: October 7, 2016
- Length: 36:53
- Label: Republic
- Producers: Ricky Reed (also exec.); Sarah Barthel; Josh Carter; John Hill; Dan Wilson

Phantogram chronology
Voices (2014)	Three (2016)	Ceremony (2020)

Professional ratings
Aggregate scores
Source	Rating
Metacritic	66/100
Review scores
Source	Rating
AllMusic	2.5/5 stars
Pitchfork	5.8/10

Three is the third studio album by American electronic rock duo Phantogram, released October 7, 2016 by Republic Records. It was produced by band members Josh Carter and Sarah Barthel, along with Ricky Reed, John Hill, and Dan Wilson. The album was preceded by the June 2016 release of the single "You Don't Get Me High Anymore".

== Background ==
In the nine years until Three's release, Phantogram, a duo of Josh Carter and Sarah Barthel, transformed from an indie trip hop act to a Republic Records-signed pop act, collaborating with the likes of Miley Cyrus, Skrillex and Big Boi. Barthel's older sister, Becky, died by suicide in January 2016, which greatly impacted the album.

"You Don't Get Me High Anymore" samples the drum break from "Hook And Sling (Part I)," a 1969 track by Eddie Bo that he wrote with Alfred Scramuzza. Bo (under his real name, Edwin Bocage) and Scramuzza have writers credits on the song.

== Release ==
The album debuted at No. 5 on the Billboard Top Album Sales chart and No. 9 on the Billboard 200. It included the single "You Don't Get Me High Anymore", produced by Josh Carter and Reed. A series of promotional remixes of the lead single by How to Dress Well, A-Trak, Miami Horror, Attlas, and The Range were released following the album.

== Track listing ==
No.	Title	Writer(s)	Producer(s)	Length
1.	"Funeral Pyre"	Eric Frederic; Dan Wilson; Sarah Barthel; Josh Carter	John Hill; Carter; Ricky Reed	4:05
2.	"Same Old Blues"	Frederic; Barthel; Wilson; Carter; Eric Tobias Wincorn; Ernest Fowler	Reed; Wilson^{[a]}; Carter^{[a]}; Barthel^{[a]}	3:30
3.	"You Don't Get Me High Anymore"	Frederic; Carter; Barthel; Wilson; Edwin J. Bocage; Alfred Scramuzza	Carter; Reed; Barthel^{[a]}; Wilson^{[a]}	3:40
4.	"Cruel World"	Frederic; Wilson; Carter; Barthel; Lee Moses	Carter; Reed; Barthel^{[b]}; Wilson^{[b]}	2:57
5.	"Barking Dog"	Frederic; Carter; Steve Reich^{[c]}	Carter; Reed	3:02
6.	"You're Mine"	Frederic; Barthel; Wilson; Carter; Willie Clarke; Clarence Reid	Carter; Reed; Wilson^{[b]}; Barthel^{[b]}	2:51
7.	"Answer"	Frederic; Barthel; Carter; Wilson	Carter; Reed	3:51
8.	"Run Run Blood"	Frederic; Wilson; Barthel; Carter; Terius Nash; Christopher Stewart	Carter; Reed; Barthel^{[b]}	5:00
9.	"Destroyer"	Frederic; Wilson; Barthel; Carter	Carter; Reed; Barthel^{[a]}	4:17
10.	"Calling All"	Frederic; Wilson; Carter; Barthel; Nash; Stewart; Simeon Coxe; Stanley Warren	Carter; Reed; Wilson^{[a]}; Barthel^{[b]}	3:40
Total length:				36:53

Notes

- ^{^[a]} signifies a co-producer
- ^{^[b]} signifies an additional producer
- ^{^[c]} The track incorporates string lines from the third movement, After The War, of Reich's 1988 composition Different Trains.

== Personnel ==
Credits adapted from Tidal.

Phantogram

- Sarah Barthel - vocals (all tracks), synthesizer programming (1, 5–6), piano (5), programming (8), synthesizer (8–10), guitar (9)
- Josh Carter - vocals (all tracks), guitar (all tracks), programming (1–7, 9–10), synthesizer (1, 3, 5–7, 9–10), percussion (7), drums (8)

Additional musicians

- Matt Chamberlain - drums (1)
- Darby Cicci - trumpet (8)
- Andrew Dunn - trombone (8)
- Lauren Evans - additional vocals (8)
- Ricky Reed - programming (1–7), synthesizer programming (1, 2, 4–7, 9–10), guitar (2–4, 6–8, 10), percussion (2, 7), bass guitar (3, 6), drums (6), glockenspeil (8), synthesizer (8–10), piano (10)
- Dan Wilson - guitar (2), bass guitar (3), glockenspiel (7), piano (7)

Production

- Mario Borgatta - assistant mixer (5, 7–10)
- Martin Cooke - assistant engineer (all tracks)
- Rich Costey - mix engineer (5, 7–10)
- Robin Florent - assistant mixer (1–4, 6)
- Nicolas Fournier - assistant engineer (all tracks), assistant mixer (5, 7–10)
- Chris Galland - assistant mixer (1–4, 6)
- Jeff Jackson - assistant mixer (1–4, 6)
- Chris Kasych - engineer (1), assistant mixer (5, 7–10)
- Manny Marroquin - mix engineer (1–4, 6)
- Ricky Reed - executive producer
- Laura Sisk - engineer (1)
- Ethan Shumaker - recording engineer (all tracks)

Design

- Nicolas Balcazar - cover photo
- Josh Carter - art direction, slipcover concept
- Timothy Saccenti - photography
- Joe Spix - art direction, design

== Charts ==
Chart (2016)	Peak position
Australian Albums (ARIA)	93
Canadian Albums (Billboard)	38
US Billboard 200	9
