= Voices (Phantogram album) =

2014 studio album by Phantogram

Studio album by Phantogram
- Released: February 18, 2014
- Recorded: 2013
- Genres: Electronica; trip hop; indie pop
- Length: 43:52
- Label: Republic
- Producers: Phantogram; John Hill

Phantogram chronology
| Nightlife (2011) | Voices (2014) | Three (2016) |

Singles from Voices
- 1. "Fall in Love" Released: December 10, 2013; 2. "Nothing But Trouble" Released: January 14, 2014; 3. "Black Out Days" Released: June 3, 2014

Voices is the second studio album by American electronic rock duo Phantogram, released February 18, 2014 by Republic Records. It was produced by the band and John Hill. Steven Drozd of the Flaming Lips contributed to the song "Never Going Home".

== Reception ==
Professional ratings
Aggregate scores
| Source | Rating |
|---|---|
| AnyDecentMusic? | 6.9/10 |
| Metacritic | 74/100 |
Review scores
| Source | Rating |
| AllMusic | 3.5/5 stars |
| Alternative Press | 4.5/5 stars |
| The A.V. Club | B |
| Entertainment Weekly | A− |
| The Irish Times | 4/5 stars |
| The Observer | 3/5 stars |
| Pitchfork | 6.0/10 |
| PopMatters | 8/10 |
| Q | 3/5 stars |
| Spin | 8/10 |

The album received a Metacritic score of 74 out of 100 based on 23 critics, indicating generally favorable reviews. Alternative Press critic Reed Fischer rated the album 4.5 out of 5 stars, saying that Phantogram "pull away from the pack" on their latest album, and that their "electronic and electric guitar alchemy has simultaneously become more infectious and complex than ever before".

The album debuted at No. 11 on the Billboard 200, and No. 3 on Top Rock Albums, selling around 20,000 in the first week. The album sold 115,000 copies in the United States as of July 2016.

== In media ==
"Black Out Days" was featured in the "Gambler's Fallacy" (2013) episode of Law & Order: Special Victims Unit, the "Kill Me, Kill Me, Kill Me" (2014) episode of How to Get Away with Murder, The Originals (episode six, season one), and the "Impractical Applications" (2016) episode of The Magicians.

== Track listing ==
| No. | Title | Length |
|---|---|---|
| 1. | "Nothing But Trouble" | 4:06 |
| 2. | "Black Out Days" | 3:47 |
| 3. | "Fall in Love" | 3:44 |
| 4. | "Never Going Home" | 4:36 |
| 5. | "The Day You Died" | 3:51 |
| 6. | "Howling at the Moon" | 3:58 |
| 7. | "Bad Dreams" | 4:20 |
| 8. | "Bill Murray" | 3:36 |
| 9. | "I Don't Blame You" | 3:29 |
| 10. | "Celebrating Nothing" | 3:48 |
| 11. | "My Only Friend" | 4:36 |
| Total length: | | 43:52 |

== Charts ==
=== Weekly charts ===
| Chart (2014) | Peak position |
|---|---|
| US Billboard 200 | 11 |
| US Top Rock Albums (Billboard) | 3 |
| US Top Alternative Albums (Billboard) | 3 |

=== Year-end charts ===
| Chart (2014) | Position |
|---|---|
| US Top Rock Albums | 68 |
| US Alternative Albums (Billboard) | 50 |

== Certifications ==
| Region | Certification | Certified units/sales |
|---|---|---|
| New Zealand (RMNZ) | Gold | 7,500^{‡} |
^{‡} Sales+streaming figures based on certification alone.
