= Crash Test Dummies discography =

- Studio albums: 9
- Extended plays: 1
- Live albums: 1
- Compilation albums: 2
- Singles: 23
- Video albums: 2
- Pre-label releases: 2

The discography of Canadian folk rock/alternative rock band Crash Test Dummies consists of eight primary studio albums, 23 singles, one live album, a greatest hits compilation, and two video releases. This list does not include material recorded by band members individually or with other side projects.

== Albums ==
=== Pre-label releases ===
The band released two demo tapes. Both feature songs that would eventually appear on their debut album, as well as two songs that were never featured on future releases.

Title	Year	Notes
Original Recipe	1988	The band's original 5-song demo tape
Demo Tape 2	1989	Two song demo

=== Studio albums ===
The band's first four albums were released by BMG, while subsequent albums were released on Brad Roberts' own label Cha-Ching/Deep Fried Records.

Title	Details	Chart positions					Certifications (sales thresholds)
Title	Details	CAN	AUS	NZ	UK	US	Certifications (sales thresholds)
The Ghosts That Haunt Me	Released: April 9, 1991; Label: BMG/Arista; Format: CD, cassette, LP (Germany only)	2	110	—	—	—	MC: 4× Platinum
God Shuffled His Feet	Released: October 26, 1993; Label: BMG/Arista; Format: CD, cassette, LP (Brazil and Greece only)	11	5	1	2	9	MC: 3× Platinum; ARIA: Platinum; BPI: Gold; RIAA: 2× Platinum
A Worm's Life	Released: October 1, 1996; Label: BMG/Arista; Format: CD, cassette	20	61	30	79	78	MC: Platinum
Give Yourself a Hand	Released: March 23, 1999; Label: BMG/ViK. Recordings; Format: CD, cassette	14	—	—	—	—	
I Don't Care That You Don't Mind	Released: April 3, 2001; Label: Cha-Ching; Format: CD	—	—	—	—	—	
Puss 'n' Boots	Released: October 21, 2003; Label: Cha-Ching; Format: CD	—	—	—	—	—	
Songs of the Unforgiven	Released: October 12, 2004; Label: Deep Fried; Format: CD	—	—	—	—	—	
Oooh La La!	Released: May 11, 2010; Label: Deep Fried; Format: CD, download	—	—	—	—	—	

=== Themed/topical albums ===
The band released a single Christmas album in October 2002.

Title	Details
Jingle All the Way	Released: October 8, 2002; Label: Cha-Ching; Format: CD

=== Compilation albums ===
Crash Test Dummies released a greatest hits compilation in 2007, followed by a compilation of unreleased demos in 2011.

Title	Details
The Best of Crash Test Dummies	Released: October 1, 2007; Label: Sony BMG/Arista; Format: CD, download
Demo-litions	Released: April 19, 2011; Label: Deep Fried; Format: Limited edition CD, download

=== Live albums ===
In 2001 Brad Roberts released a live album, which consists of Crash Test Dummies songs, along with various covers.

Year	Album
Crash Test Dude (Brad Roberts solo)	Released: 2001; Label: Cha-Ching; Format: CD

== EPs ==
From 2007 to 2009, Crash Test Dummies released a collection of four songs for purchase via their online store about Brad Roberts' experiences within Cape Breton.

Title	Details
The Cape Breton Lobster Bash Series	Released: 2007–2009; Label: Deep Fried; Format: Download

== Singles ==
Title	Year	Peak chart positions										Certifications (sales thresholds)	Album
Title	Year	CAN	AUS	BEL (Fl)	FIN	GER	ICE	IRE	NZ	UK	US	Certifications (sales thresholds)	Album
"Superman's Song"	1991	4	87	—	—	—	—	—	—	—	56		The Ghosts That Haunt Me
"The Ghosts That Haunt Me"	1991	23	—	—	—	—	—	—	—	—	—		The Ghosts That Haunt Me
"Androgynous"	1991	73	198	—	—	—	—	—	—	—	—		The Ghosts That Haunt Me
"The First Noel" / "Winter Song"	1992	—	—	—	—	—	—	—	—	—	—		A Lump of Coal / The Ghosts That Haunt Me
"Mmm Mmm Mmm Mmm"	1993	14	1	1	20	1	1	3	4	2	4	ARIA: Platinum; BVMI: Gold; BPI: Gold; RIAA: Gold	God Shuffled His Feet
"Swimming in Your Ocean"	1994	6	118	—	—	—	10	—	—	—	—		God Shuffled His Feet
"Afternoons & Coffeespoons"	1994	7	40	42	16	39	2	23	41	23	66		God Shuffled His Feet
"God Shuffled His Feet"	1994	14	70	—	—	—	3	—	—	—	—		God Shuffled His Feet
"The Ballad of Peter Pumpkinhead"	1995	4	130	—	—	73	2	—	—	30	—		Dumb and Dumber Soundtrack
"He Liked to Feel It"	1996	2	127	—	—	—	—	—	—	—	—		A Worm's Life
"My Own Sunrise"	1997	33	—	—	—	—	—	—	—	—	—		A Worm's Life
"My Enemies" √	1997	71	—	—	—	—	—	—	—	—	—		A Worm's Life
"Keep a Lid on Things"	1999	5	103	—	—	—	—	—	—	—	—		Give Yourself a Hand
"Get You in the Morning"	1999	45	—	—	—	—	—	—	—	—	—		Give Yourself a Hand
"Give Yourself a Hand" √	1999	—	—	—	—	—	—	—	—	—	—		Give Yourself a Hand
"Every Morning"	2001	—	—	—	—	—	—	—	—	—	—		I Don't Care That You Don't Mind
"On and On" √	2001	—	—	—	—	—	—	—	—	—	—		I Don't Care That You Don't Mind
"The Day We Never Met"	2001	—	—	—	—	—	—	—	—	—	—		I Don't Care That You Don't Mind
"White Christmas" √	2002	—	—	—	—	—	—	—	—	—	—		Jingle All the Way
"I'm the Man" / "Flying Feeling" √	2003	—	—	—	—	—	—	—	—	—	—		Puss 'n' Boots
"Flying Feeling" √	2003	—	—	—	—	—	—	—	—	—	—		Puss 'n' Boots
"The Unforgiven Ones" √	2004	—	—	—	—	—	—	—	—	—	—		Songs of the Unforgiven
"And So Will Always Be" √	2004	—	—	—	—	—	—	—	—	—	—		Songs of the Unforgiven
"And It's Beautiful" √	2010	—	—	—	—	—	—	—	—	—	—		Oooh La La!
"Now You See Her" √	2010	—	—	—	—	—	—	—	—	—	—		Oooh La La!
"Promised Land"	2015	—	—	—	—	—	—	—	—	—	—		non-album singles
"I'll Be Peaceful Then"	2016	—	—	—	—	—	—	—	—	—	—		non-album singles
"—" indicates the single did not chart or was not released in given country. "√" indicates the single was a promotional-only release.

== Other songs ==
=== Songs recorded for non-album use ===
- "The First Noel", on A Lump of Coal and the B-side to "Androgynous" CD single.
- "The Ballad of Peter Pumpkinhead" (XTC cover), on Dumb and Dumber soundtrack (1995) and released as a single.
- "All You Pretty Girls" (XTC cover), on A Testimonial Dinner: The Songs of XTC (1995) and released as the B-side to "My Own Sunrise".
- "One Of Us", leaked acoustic demo recorded in 1994. Originally written with Brad Roberts in mind, but he ultimately did not record a full version of it.
- "Handy Candyman", on "Keep a Lid on Things" single (1999) and Give Yourself a Hand (Japanese CD).
- "Filter Queen", on "Keep a Lid on Things" single (1999)
- "Party's Over", on "Get You in the Morning" single (1999)
- ”Gus the Grasshopper”, on Roll Play (Season 3) soundtrack (2013)

== Videography ==
=== DVD and video releases ===
- Symptomology of a Rock Band: The Case of Crash Test Dummies (Music video compilation/rockumentary)
- Crash Test Dude (Brad Roberts rockumentary)

=== Music videos ===
Title	Year	Director
"Superman's Song"	1991	Dale Heslip
"Mmm Mmm Mmm Mmm"	1993	Dale Heslip
"Swimming in Your Ocean"	1994	Tim Hamilton
"Afternoons & Coffeespoons"	1994	Tim Hamilton
"God Shuffled His Feet"	1994	Tim Hamilton
"The Ballad of Peter Pumpkinhead"	1995	Tim Hamilton
"He Liked to Feel It"	1996	Ken Fox
"My Own Sunrise"	1997	Stephen Scott
"Keep a Lid on Things"	1999	Clark Eddy
"Get You in the Morning"	1999	Jeff Renfroe
