= The Best of Crash Test Dummies =

Greatest hits album by Crash Test Dummies
- Released: October 1, 2007
- Recorded: 1991–2007
- Genres: Alternative rock; folk rock
- Length: 44:07
- Labels: Sony BMG; Arista

Crash Test Dummies chronology
The Cape Breton Lobster Bash Series (2007)	The Best of Crash Test Dummies (2007)	Oooh La La (2010)

The Best of Crash Test Dummies is a 2007 compilation album by the Crash Test Dummies. It is released by Sony BMG and it includes songs from both the band's BMG and independent releases. It was released on October 1, 2007 and re-released on March 10, 2008 with the inclusion of two previously unreleased tracks. The re-release carries a slightly different title of, "Best Of Crash Test Dummies – Collections".

== Reception ==
Professional ratings
Review scores
Source	Rating
AllMusic	3.5/5 stars

AllMusic writer James Christopher Monger states that "Best of Crash Test Dummies touches on all of (the band's) albums, grabbing the strongest cuts (many of which were initially buried amongst more cringe-inducing moments) and bringing them front and center. Songs like Unforgiven Ones, Ghosts That Haunt Me, the still heartbreaking Superman Song and even the one-off cover of XTC's Ballad of Peter Pumpkinhead (recorded when the original was only a year old), and the oddball faux-neo-soul of Keep a Lid on Things are oddly infectious, though just as divisive now as they were in their heyday."

== Track listing ==
The Best of Crash Test Dummies track listing
No.	Title	Length
1.	"Superman's Song"	4:30
2.	"Mmm Mmm Mmm Mmm"	3:53
3.	"The Ghosts That Haunt Me"	3:44
4.	"Afternoons & Coffeespoons"	3:55
5.	"The Ballad of Peter Pumpkinhead" (feat. Ellen Reid)	3:44
6.	"He Liked to Feel It"	3:54
7.	"Flying Feeling"	3:22
8.	"Every Morning"	2:49
9.	"Keep a Lid on Things"	2:44
10.	"The Day We Never Met"	4:21
11.	"The Unforgiven Ones"	2:51
12.	"It'll Never Leave You Alone"	3:15

2008 reissue bonus tracks
No.	Title	Length
13.	"Laid Back"	3:52
14.	"You Said You'd Meet Me (In California)" (Later version included on Oooh La La!)	3:13
