= Demo-litions =

Demo-litions: Cast-off Recordings 1996–97

Compilation album by Crash Test Dummies
- Released: April 19, 2011
- Recorded: 1996–1997
- Genres: Rock; alternative rock; folk rock
- Length: 39:08
- Label: Deep Fried Records

Crash Test Dummies chronology
Oooh La La! (2010)	Demo-litions: Cast-off Recordings 1996–97 (2011)

Demo-litions: Cast-off Recordings 1996–97 is a 2011 compilation album by the Crash Test Dummies. It consists of unreleased demos made during the songwriting process that eventually resulted in the album Give Yourself a Hand. The album was self-released via the band's website on April 19, 2011 as both a limited edition CD and MP3 download.

== Background ==
Demo-litions features demos recorded by Crash Test Dummies between 1996–97. During this time, the band was trying to record a follow-up to A Worm's Life. Because that album didn't match the success of God Shuffled His Feet, the band's label BMG was much more restrictive towards the band and rejected 35 songs recorded during this time before finally settling on the album that would become Give Yourself a Hand.

== Track listing ==
All tracks are written by Brad Roberts, except as noted.

No.	Title	Writer(s)	Length
1.	"My PussyCat and Me"		2:38
2.	"Black Ice"	Roberts, Pat MacDonald	2:42
3.	"You Won't Run Out"	Roberts, Louise Goffin	4:13
4.	"You See That House?"		2:23
5.	"Mercy Kill Me"		2:44
6.	"Digestive Process"		2:22
7.	"Much Better"		3:12
8.	"Hold It Like an Egg"		3:06
9.	"Satellites Pass Over"	Roberts, Ellen Reid	2:37
10.	"It's Not That I Don't Feel Sorry"		3:17
11.	"It Might Be Rather Nice"	Roberts, Greg Wells, John Parish	3:40
12.	"After My Dinner"	Roberts, Reid	3:29
13.	"When the Old Man Comes"		2:45
