= Promised Land (Crash Test Dummies song) =

2015 single by Crash Test Dummies

Single by Marc Mysterio & Crash Test Dummies
- Released: September 25, 2015
- Genre: Rock
- Length: 3:18
- Label: Sony Music
- Songwriter(s): Marc Mysterio
- Producer(s): Marc Mysterio

Marc Mysterio & Crash Test Dummies singles chronology
"Now You See Her" (2010)	"Promised Land" (2015)	"I'll Be Peaceful Then" (2016)

"Promised Land" is a collaboration between producer/composer Marc Mysterio, rock band Crash Test Dummies and Mark Crozer meant to honor and benefit the International Federation of Red Cross and Red Crescent Societies whose resources, doctors, nurses and lawyers were severely stressed – to near breaking point – by the influx of refugees descending upon Europe in 2015. Mysterio and Crash Test Dummies previously collaborated in March 2015, when Mysterio released a remix of the band's 1993 hit Mmm Mmm Mmm Mmm.

On February 5, 2016, 'Promised Land' was released by Sony Music, marking the band's first major label release of new material in nearly two decades.

== Personnel ==
- Mark Crozer, guitars, bass, drums, piano
- Marc Mysterio, vocals
- Brad Roberts, vocals

== Music video ==
The music video for the song consists of shots of refugees across Europe, including a subtitled interview with one of them.
