= He Liked to Feel It =

1996 single by Crash Test Dummies

Single by Crash Test Dummies

from the album A Worm's Life
- Released: September 9, 1996
- Studio: Compass Point (The Bahamas)
- Length: 3:55
- Label: Arista; RCA
- Songwriter: Brad Roberts
- Producers: Brad Roberts; Dan Roberts; Michel Dorge

Crash Test Dummies singles chronology
"The Ballad of Peter Pumpkinhead" (1995)	"He Liked to Feel It" (1996)	"My Own Sunrise" (1997)

Music video
- "He Liked to Feel It" on YouTube

"He Liked to Feel It" is a song by Canadian rock band Crash Test Dummies, released as the second track on their third studio album, A Worm's Life (1996). The song was written by the band's lead singer, Brad Roberts, and was produced by Brad alongside his brother and bassist Dan Roberts alongside drummer Michel "Mitch" Dorge. Arista Records released it as the lead single from A Worm's Life on September 9, 1996. The lyrics of the song originated from Brad Roberts' personal reflections about teeth, telling a story in which a boy likes the removal of his baby teeth via bizarre methods.

The song is Crash Test Dummies' highest-peaking single in their native Canada, reaching number two on the RPM 100 Hit Tracks chart in 1996. "He Liked to Feel It" failed to chart elsewhere except on the US Billboard Triple-A chart, peaking at number 18. A music video directed by Ken Fox and produced by David Moskowitz was made for the song, featuring a boy who pulls out his own teeth through different means. The video generated controversy due to the graphic imagery of the boy's mouth, which utilizes prosthetic teeth and gums.

== Background and composition ==
"He Liked to Feel It"
A 23-second sample of the ending of "He Liked to Feel It", where the boy's father yanks out his son's tooth with a pair of pliers.

Brad Roberts wrote "He Liked to Feel It". His brother Dan Roberts helped him produce the song, as did Michel Dorge. The song was recorded at Compass Point Studios in The Bahamas along with the rest of A Worm's Life. The lyrical theme of "He Liked to Feel It", intended as dark humour, came about when Brad Roberts began to ponder over his own teeth. He explained, "I was sitting around one day feeling my teeth, and I noticed that they were firmly imbedded in my skull [...] Teeth are part of the human body, but I thought that it was strange that they come out."

Ellen Reid provides the backup vocals and keyboards on the song while Dan Roberts plays bass and Dorge plays drums. Murray Pulver, who would join the band in 1996, provides additional guitars on the track. Roberts began to write the lyrics, creating a story about a boy who likes to remove his baby teeth through bizarre means. At the end of the song, the boy's father forcefully rips out a tooth with a pair of pliers, which the boy does not enjoy because he is not the one removing it.

== Release and promotion ==
"He Liked to Feel It" was included as the second track on A Worm's Life, which was released on October 1, 1996; it was released as the album's lead single in both Canada and the United States. Arista Records serviced the song to adult album alternative radio on September 9, 1996, and to modern rock and rock stations on September 23. On Canada's RPM 100 Hit Tracks chart, the song debuted at number 83 on the issue dated September 16, 1996. On September 30, it jumped from number 68 to number 36, becoming that week's highest climber. The song continued to rise up the chart during the next several weeks, attaining its peak of number two on November 25, 1996. The song logged 21 weeks in the top 100. It is Crash Test Dummies' highest-peaking single on the RPM 100 Hit Tracks chart, and it was the 23rd most-successful single on the chart in 1996. "He Liked to Feel It" also appeared on RPM's Adult Contemporary and Alternative 30 weekly rankings, achieving peaks of numbers seven and 21, respectively. In the US, "He Liked to Feel It" appeared on the Triple-A chart, on which it peaked at number 18 on November 2, 1996. In the United Kingdom, a CD single and cassette single were issued on October 7, 1996, but the song did not appear on the UK Singles Chart. In Australia, the song peaked outside the ARIA Singles Chart top 100, at number 127.

The music video for the song was directed by Ken Fox and produced by David Moskowitz. Eric Barret executive produced the video for Original Films. The video features the band performing on a New York City rooftop interspersed with scenes of a boy, played by Leo Fitzpatrick, pulling his teeth out in various ways, including tying a tooth to a taxicab, tying one to a steak and throwing it to a dog on the other side of a fence, and tying a tooth to a crane. After the boy falls off the crane, a man approaches him and pulls out another tooth with pliers. Prosthetic teeth and gums were utilized to obtain the tooth effects used in the video. As a result of the graphic footage, the music video was banned from airing on Canadian television channel YTV, and all close-ups of the boy's gums had to be removed before the video could be shown on American television network MTV.

== Track listings ==
All tracks were written by Brad Roberts.

European CD single

1. "He Liked to Feel It" (radio edit) – 3:38
2. "He Liked to Feel It" (Omnichord version) – 3:55

European maxi-CD single

1. "He Liked to Feel It" (radio edit) – 3:38
2. "He Liked to Feel It" (Omnichord version) – 3:55
3. "Afternoons & Coffeespoons" (live at The Chance in Poughkeepsie, New York) – 3:52
4. "Swimming in Your Ocean" (live at The Chance in Poughkeepsie, New York) – 3:30

== Credits and personnel ==
Credits are lifted from the liner notes of A Worm's Life and the European maxi-single of "He Liked to Feel It".

Studio

- Recorded at Compass Point Studios (The Bahamas).

Crash Test Dummies

- Brad Roberts – lead vocals, guitars, writing, production
- Ellen Reid – back-up vocals, keyboards
- Dan Roberts – bass, production
- Mitch Dorge – drums, percussion, production, digital work

Additional musicians

- Murray Pulver – additional guitars

Recording

- Chris Anderson – recording
- Peter Robertson – recording assistance
- Maria Miccio – recording assistance
- Tom Lord-Alge – mixing
- Nevessa Production – mobile recording facility for live tracks

== Charts ==
=== Weekly charts ===
Weekly chart performance for "He Liked to Feel It"
Chart (1996)	Peak position
Australia (ARIA)	127
Canada Top Singles (RPM)	2
Canada Adult Contemporary (RPM)	7
Canada Rock/Alternative (RPM)	21
European Hit Radio (Music & Media)	36
US Adult Alternative Airplay (Billboard)	18

=== Year-end charts ===
1996 year-end chart performance for "He Liked to Feel It"
Chart (1996)	Position
Canada Top Singles (RPM)	23
Canada Adult Contemporary (RPM)	55

== Release history ==
Release dates and formats for "He Liked to Feel It"
Region	Date	Format(s)	Label(s)	ID	Ref.
Canada	1996	Promotional CD	Arista	KCDP 51386	
United States	September 9, 1996	Adult album alternative radio	Arista	—N/a	
United States	September 23, 1996	Modern rock; rock radio	Arista	—N/a	
United Kingdom	October 7, 1996	CD	RCA	74321402002	
United Kingdom	October 7, 1996	Cassette	RCA	74321402004	
Europe	1996	CD	Arista	74231 40283 2	
Europe	1996	Maxi-CD	Arista	74321 40192 2	
