= And It's Beautiful =

2010 single by Crash Test Dummies

Single by Crash Test Dummies

from the album Oooh La La!
- Released: April 2010
- Recorded: Water Music, Hoboken, New Jersey
- Genre: Alternative rock, chamber pop
- Label: Deep Fried Records
- Songwriter(s): Brad Roberts, Stewart Lerman
- Producer(s): Stewart Lerman

Crash Test Dummies singles chronology
"And So Will Always Be" (2004)	"And It's Beautiful" (2010)	"Now You See Her" (2010)

And It's Beautiful is a song by Canadian group Crash Test Dummies and was the promotional single from their 2010 album Oooh La La!. Brad Roberts describes the song as the first love song he has ever written, with the song being more happy and upbeat than the band's previous material.

== Track listings ==
Promo CD

1. "And It's Beautiful" (radio edit) – 3:12
2. "And It's Beautiful" (album version) – 3:24

== Lyrics and Interpretation ==
The song is a full-blown love song, which Brad Roberts describes as incredibly difficult to write and it was territory that wouldn't even think about touching during his younger days. The song has been interpreted about being about Robert's relationship with his wife.

The lyrics of the song, such as "We turn our water into wine/ it's something we do all the time/ it doesn't cost a single dime/ And its beautiful" are noted to be remarkable for both their simplicity and their ability to convey so much with so little.

The song features a mantra chant interlude, which is an activity Brad Roberts had taken up (along with Yoga) during the band's hiatus (and formed the basis for his side-project Satsang Circus).

== Music video ==
The music video for the song consists of a montage of various images including clouds moving through the sky, plants growing, ice melting, a carousel, roses falling, and many objects shaped like hearts. The video also uses pixilation animation to depict shots of Brad Roberts walking down a street.
