= Cinderellen =

Album by Ellen Reid

Studio album by Ellen Reid
- Released: December 14, 2001
- Genre: Pop; pop rock
- Length: 60:39
- Label: Mr. Friendly Productions
- Producer: Scott Harding; Greg Wells; Jimmy Harry; Chris Fudurich; Ellen Reid

Singles from Cinderellen
- 1. "Send Me Home" Released: 2001

Cinderellen is the 2001 debut solo album by Canadian recording artist Ellen Reid.

== Reception ==
Professional ratings
Review scores
Source	Rating
Allmusic	3/5 stars
Winnipeg Sun	Positive

The album received fairly positive reviews. Allmusic writer Jason MacNeil gave the album 3 out of 5 stars and states that the "softer, gentler vocal half of Crash Test Dummies has produced an interesting and evolving solo collection ranging from the quasi-industrialized synthesizer on "Make You Mine" to a world music feeling on "Everything," with its electronic layers in the vein of Depeche Mode and its Exciter album." However, he also notes that "a slight annoyance is how the album seems segmented, with songs in the same style running in consecutive order instead of being mixed". Darryl Sterdan of the Winnipeg Sun states that "Cinderellen turns out to be kind of a surprise party. Instead of making the sort of album you'd expect -- one that sounds like her old band -- Ellen recorded all sorts of tunes that remind you of all sorts of people." However, he also makes a criticism in that there are too many ballads during the latter half of the album.

== Track listing ==
All tracks written by Ellen Reid, except where noted.

1. "Make You Mine" – 3:32
2. "Everything" (Mark Makoway and Reid) – 4:26
3. "Bullet" – 4:34
4. "Send Me Home" (Jimmy Harry and Reid) – 3:50
5. "Mirror" (Makoway and Reid) – 3:47
6. "Anybody Will Do" (Reid and Greg Wells) – 3:29
7. "Get Into" – 5:35
8. "Force Field" – 4:14
9. "In Defence of the Wicked Queen" – 4:48
10. "True Love" – 3:47
11. "You're Early" – 18:38
  - Ends at 5:00, followed by the hidden track "I've Done a Bad Thing" at 15:00

== Personnel ==
- Ellen Reid – vocals, piano, keyboards
- Chris Fudurich – bass guitar, guitars, programming on tracks 1, 3, 6
- Scott Harding – guitar on tracks 2, 7, 8
- Jimmy Harry – guitars, programming on track 4
- Stuart Cameron – guitar, lap steel on tracks 5 and 8
- Tony Maimone – bass guitar on tracks 2, 5, 7, 8
- Andrew Hall – acoustic bass on track 11
- Chris Brown – Wurlitzer piano and Hammond organ on tracks 2, 5, 7, 8, and 11, universal organ on track 2
- Kenny Wollesen – drums, percussion on tracks 2, 5, 7, 8
- Jane Scarpantoni – cello on track 11
- Antoine Silverman – violin on tracks 8, 11
