= Jingle All the Way (Crash Test Dummies album) =

Studio album by Crash Test Dummies
- Released: October 8, 2002
- Recorded: Magic Shop, New York City
- Genre: Christmas
- Length: 37:28
- Label: Cha-Ching
- Producer: Scott Harding

Crash Test Dummies chronology
I Don't Care That You Don't Mind (2001)	Jingle All the Way (2002)	Puss 'n' Boots (2003)

Jingle All the Way is a 2002 Christmas album by Crash Test Dummies.

== Reception ==
Professional ratings
Review scores
Source	Rating
Allmusic	3/5 stars

== Track listing ==
No.	Title	Length
1.	"White Christmas"	3:15
2.	"O Little Town of Bethlehem"	4:13
3.	"Jingle Bells"	1:38
4.	"In the Bleak Midwinter"	3:54
5.	"God Rest Ye Merry Gentlemen"	2:50
6.	"We Three Kings"	4:00
7.	"The Little Drummer Boy"	4:05
8.	"The First Noel" (Previously recorded by band for compilation A Lump of Coal)	4:25
9.	"Silent Night"	3:16
10.	"Good King Wenceslas"	2:31
11.	"The Huron Carol"	3:21
Total length:		37:28

== Personnel ==
- Brad Roberts – vocals on "White Christmas," "Jingle Bells," "God Rest Ye Merry Gentlemen," "We Three Kings," "The First Noel," and "Good King Wenceslas", electric guitar on "The Little Drummer Boy" and "The First Noel," baritone ukulele on "Jingle Bells"
- Ellen Reid – vocals on "O Little Town of Bethlehem," "In the Bleak Midwinter," "We Three Kings," "Little Drummer Boy," "The First Noel," "Silent Night," "Good King Wenceslas," and "The Huron Carol"
- Dan Roberts – bass guitar
- Chris Brown – Hammond organ, Wurlitzer piano, universal organ, piano
- Kenny Wollesen – drums, percussion, chimes, sleigh bells, timpani on "Little Drummer Boy," tom tom on "Little Drummer Boy"
- Andrew Hall – upright bass
- Scott Harding – guitar, percussion, finger snaps on "God Rest Ye Merry Gentlemen"
- Bob Hoffnar – pedal steel guitar on "O Little Town of Bethlehem" and "Silent Night"
- Jane Scarpantoni – cello on "In the Bleak Midwinter" and "The Huron Carol"
- Jerry Dodgion – flute on "God Rest Ye Merry Gentlemen," piccolo on "Good King Wenceslas"
- Ming Xiao-Fen – pipa on "We Three Kings"
- Stuart Cameron – acoustic guitar on "We Three Kings" and "Good King Wenceslas"
- James Ross – trumpet on "Little Drummer Boy," piccolo trumpet on "Good King Wenceslas"
- Brian Harding – trombone on "Little Drummer Boy," and "Good King Wenceslas"
- Javier Gandara – french Horn on "Little Drummer Boy," and "Good King Wenceslas"
