= Marc Mysterio =

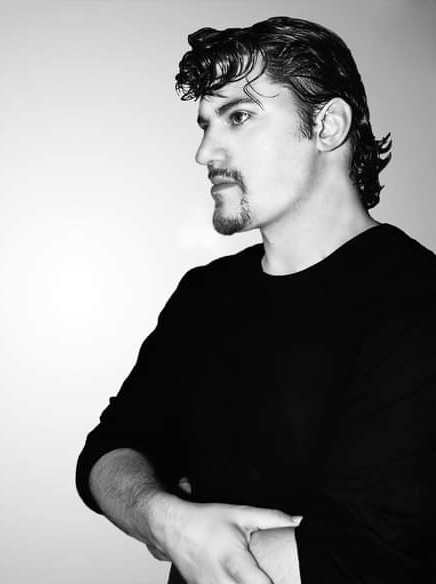
- Marc Mysterio in 2014

Background information
- Origin: Canada
- Genres: House; French house; dance; pop
- Occupations: Dj, singer
- Instruments: Piano, guitar, vocals
- Years active: 2007–present
- Labels: World Class Records; Spinnin Records; Sony Music Entertainment
- Website: looktothestars.org/celebrity/marc-mysterio

Marc Mysterio is an Irish-Canadian professional boxer, producer, singer, songwriter and actor, with a label called World Class Records, and music publishing company Amerada Music. He was also signed as an artist to Sony Music.

== Career ==
Mysterio first became recognized in 2007 for his first single "Answer This" (featuring Linda Newman). Mysterio's debut release, "Roll Wit It" was released in 2008 by Spinnin Records and featured the vocals of Chris Willis (singer of David Guetta anthems "Love Is Gone" and "Gettin' Over You").

On January 2, 2009, Mysterio released a cover remix version of "One More Time" by Daft Punk.

Mysterio released "Tomorrow (Is Another Day)", featuring Samantha Fox, which debuted on radio worldwide on August 7, 2009, on stations worldwide, including: NRJ, Power 106, and Radio 538. It was licensed by Sony Music. and included on Samantha Fox's Greatest Hits (2009).

His 2009 album release Redemption included collaborations with Samantha Fox, Gary Pine, Lillix, Tiff Lacey, Dhany, Chris Willis Shena, and Yardi Don.

He then went on to tour Europe, Scandinavia, and Russia. Included in this tour were live performances on NRJ, Radio 538 and BBC Radio 1 with Judge Jules.

== 2010–2020 ==
In 2010, TMZ and Popeater reported that on August 23, 2010, Mysterio filed a lawsuit against Brandy Norwood seeking up to $6 million in damages. According to reports, Brandy had been paid $10,000 as a side artist fee to feature on Mysterio's debut album's lead single, "Shout It Out". The invoice and an email from her manager Ryan Ramsey confirming receipt of the funds have been published by British tabloid, Anorak, but then backed out of the deal. A subpoena was issued by the court ordering copies of videotapes of conversations between Mysterio and Brandy which were recorded by VH1 for her Family Business Season 2 Reality Show. The single "Shout It Out" without Brandy peaked at No. 47 on Mediabase Canada Hot AC Radio Chart Brandy later paid a settlement to Mysterio.

In 2012, Mysterio signed a global artist deal with Sony Music. Sony Music partnered with Edmundo Andrada of Sveriges Radio (National Radio Sweden) and Etienne Dumon of CBC Radio for a radio documentary on Mysterio's career to date, concluding with the world debut of "Everything Is All Wrong". Interviewed for the documentary were friends DJ Riddler of WKTU & WHTZ as well as Craig Pereira of Sony Music and Matt Adell, CEO of Beatport.

Later in 2012, Mysterio re-wrote and re-produced The 2012 Eurovision Semi-final Hungarian Entry of Kati Wolf, "What About My Dreams", in French re-titled "Dix Pas Cent Pas".

In 2013, Mysterio collaborated with Flo Rida for a song entitled "Booty On The Floor". The song was released on Monday, June 10, 2013, on Beatport, with all profits from the Beatport Release to go to One Fund Boston, to benefit the victims and families of the Boston Marathon bombing.

In 2015, Mysterio wrote, composed, produced and sang on the duet charity single "Promised Land" with Crash Test Dummies featuring Mark Crozer on guitar and drums. This was a follow-up of his remix of Crash Test Dummies' 1993 single "Mmm Mmm Mmm Mmm" and charted in numerous countries, including Belgium, Greece, and Finland including No. 1 on Beatport and iTunes.

On February 5, 2016, "Promised Land" was released by Sony Music, marking his return to the major label release.

In June 2016, "Be The Truth" was released which reached No. 7 on both UK Music Week Official Club Chart and USA Billboard Next Big Sound Chart while ESPN Show FIRST TAKE used the hit as a theme song for December 2016.

On January 13, 2016, Trailer Park Boys and Bubbles finally released "Liquor & Whores" as an EDM track produced by Mysterio on Sony Music.

== 2020–present ==
"Liquor & Whores" was certified gold by the International Federation of the Phonographic Industry Austria in 2020.

Later in 2020, his song "Balans" with Alexandra Stan and Mohombi was similarly certified gold by IFPI Austria.

Mysterio has also been credited as the composer for the Trailer Park Boys Television Series on Netflix where he has previously appeared on-screen as a DJ as a guest celebrity star.

Mysterio scored his first Billboard charts hit with "The Dancefloor" debuting at No. 41 on Hot Dance/Electronic Songs. The song, released in September 2022, tallied 580,000 U.S. streams in the latest tracking week ending November 25, 2023.

== Discography ==
=== Singles ===
- 2008: "Roll wit It" featuring Chris Willis (Spinnin' Records)
- 2009: "One More Time" (Daft Punk Cover) (World Class Records)
- 2009: "Sunshine" featuring Gary Pine (Hi-Bias Records)
- 2009: "Tomorrow" with Samantha Fox (Sony Music Entertainment)
- 2010: "Shout It Out" (Armada Music)
- 2011: "Let Loose" featuring Sandy Vee (Hi-Bias)
- 2012: "Everything Is All Wrong" featuring Karl Wolf (Sony Music Entertainment)
- 2012: "Dix Pas Cent Pas" by Kati Wolf featuring Marc Mysterio (Sony Music Entertainment)
- 2013: "Booty on the Floor" by Marc Mysterio featuring Flo Rida (Sony Music Entertainment)
- 2015: "Promised Land" by Marc Mysterio featuring Crash Test Dummies
- 2014: "Mmm Mmm Mmm Mmm" (Marc Mysterio vs. Crash Test Dummies)
- 2017: "Phenomenal (AJ Styles)"
- 2017: "Liquor & Whores" (Marc Mysterio and Trailer Park Boys feat. Bubbles)
- 2018: "Balans" (Alexandra Stan and Mohombi feat. Marc Mysterio)
- 2023: "The Dancefloor" by Marc Mysterio featuring Flo Rida

=== Remixes ===
- 2007: David Guetta – "Delirious" (Marc Mysterio remix)
- 2018: Avicii – "Bromance" (Marc Mysterio remix)

== Awards ==
International Federation of the Phonographic Industry, Austria and Finland:

- IFPI GOLD — "Balans"
- IFPI GOLD — "Liquor & Whores"

=== Other ===
- Next Big Sound — 2016, Marc Mysterio
- "The Dancefloor" – Hot Dance/Electronic Billboard Chart No. 41 (Nov 25, 2023)
