= White Christmas (song) =

1942 song written by Irving Berlin

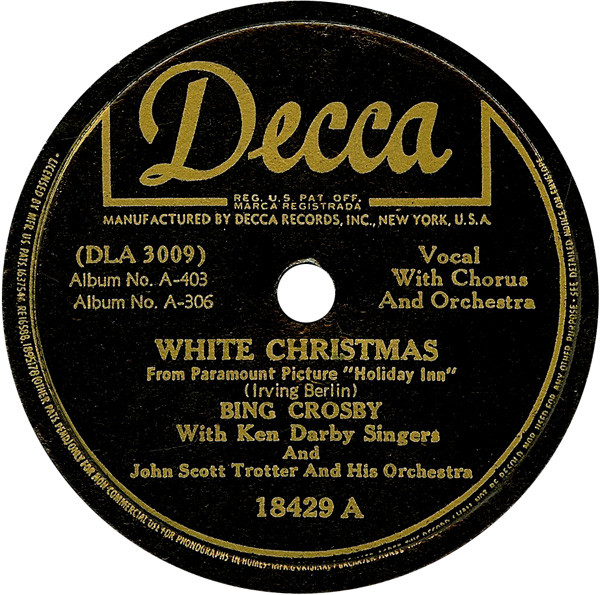
- 1942 78 single release of "White Christmas" by Bing Crosby on Decca Records, 18429 A, with Ken Darby Singers and John Scott Trotter and His Orchestra, Matrix # DLA 3009

Single by Bing Crosby with Ken Darby Singers and John Scott Trotter and His Orchestra

from the album Song Hits from Holiday Inn
- B-side: "Let's Start the New Year Right"; "God Rest Ye Merry Gentlemen"; "Jingle Bells"
- Published: 1942 by the Irving Berlin Music Corporation
- Released: July 30, 1942 (original)
- Recorded: May 29, 1942; March 19, 1947
- Studio: Radio Recorders (Los Angeles) (1942 recording)
- Genre: Traditional pop
- Length: 3:02 (1942 recording); 3:04 (1947 recording)
- Label: Decca (1942–1973 issues); MCA (1983–1985 issues)
- Songwriter: Irving Berlin

Bing Crosby singles chronology
"Be Careful, It's My Heart" (1942)	"White Christmas" (1942)	"Moonlight Becomes You" (1942)

"White Christmas" is a song reminiscing about an old-fashioned Christmas setting. Written by Irving Berlin for the 1942 musical film Holiday Inn, the song won the Academy Award for Best Original Song at the 15th Academy Awards.

Introduced by Bing Crosby, it topped the Billboard chart for 11 weeks and returned to the number one position again in December 1943 and 1944. His version would return to the top 40 a dozen times in subsequent years, the most recent being 2025. Crosby's version is the world's best-selling single (in terms of sales of physical media), with estimated sales in excess of 50 million physical copies worldwide. When the figures for other versions of the song are added to Crosby's, sales of the song exceed 100 million. It also remains one of the best-selling singles in the United States with estimated physical copies sold between 10 and 12 million as of 1963.

Since its release, "White Christmas" has been covered by many artists.

== History ==
=== Origin ===
Accounts vary as to when and where Berlin wrote the song. One story is that he wrote it in 1940, in warm La Quinta, California, while staying at the La Quinta Hotel, a frequent Hollywood retreat also favored by writer-director-producer Frank Capra, although the Arizona Biltmore also claims the song was written there. He often stayed up all night writing. One day he told his secretary, "I want you to take down a song I wrote over the weekend. Not only is it the best song I ever wrote, it's the best song anybody ever wrote."

=== Bing Crosby versions ===
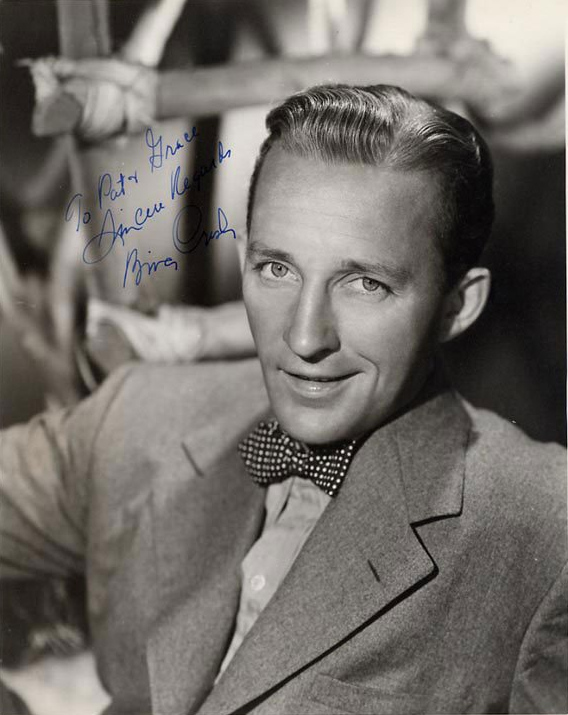
Bing Crosby (1943)

The first public performance of the song was by Bing Crosby, on his NBC radio show The Kraft Music Hall on Christmas Day, 1941, a few weeks after the attack on Pearl Harbor. Crosby subsequently recorded the song with the John Scott Trotter Orchestra and the Ken Darby Singers at Radio Recorders for Decca Records in 18 minutes on May 29, 1942, and it was released on July 30 as part of an album of six 78-rpm discs from the musical film Holiday Inn. At first, Crosby did not see anything special about the song. He just said "I don't think we have any problems with that one, Irving."

The song established that there could be commercially successful secular Christmas songs—in this case, written by a Jewish immigrant to the United States. Ronald D. Lankford Jr., wrote, "During the 1940s, 'White Christmas' would set the stage for a number of classic American holiday songs steeped in a misty longing for yesteryear." Before 1942, Christmas songs and films had come out sporadically, and many were popular. However, "the popular culture industry had not viewed the themes of home and hearth, centered on the Christmas holiday, as a unique market" until after the success of "White Christmas" and the film where it appeared, Holiday Inn. Dave Marsh and Steve Propes wrote, "'White Christmas' changed Christmas music forever, both by revealing the huge potential market for Christmas songs and by establishing the themes of home and nostalgia that would run through Christmas music evermore."

The song initially performed poorly and was overshadowed by Holiday Inn's first hit song: "Be Careful, It's My Heart". By the end of October 1942, "White Christmas" topped the Your Hit Parade chart. It remained in that position until well into the new year. It has often been noted that the mix of melancholy—"just like the ones I used to know"—with comforting images of home—"where the treetops glisten"—resonated especially strongly with listeners during World War II. The Armed Forces Network was flooded with requests for the song. The recording is noted for Crosby's whistling during the second chorus.

In 1942 alone, Crosby's recording spent eleven weeks on top of the Billboard charts. The original version also hit number one on the Harlem Hit Parade for three weeks, Crosby's first-ever appearance on the black-oriented chart. The song also topped the following weekly charts in the same year: Songs with Most Radio Plugs, National record sales, and National sheet music sales. Re-released by Decca, the single returned to the No. 1 spot during the holiday seasons of 1945 and 1946 (on the chart dated January 4, 1947). The recording became a chart perennial, reappearing annually on the pop chart twenty times before Billboard magazine created a distinct Christmas chart for seasonal releases.

In Holiday Inn, the composition won the Academy Award for Best Original Song in 1942. In the film, Crosby sings "White Christmas" as a duet with actress Marjorie Reynolds, though her voice was dubbed by Martha Mears. This now-familiar scene was not the moviemakers' initial plan. In the script as originally conceived, Reynolds, not Crosby, would sing the song. The song would feature in another Crosby film, the 1954 musical White Christmas, which became the highest-grossing film of 1954. (Crosby made yet another studio recording of the song, accompanied by Joseph J. Lilley's orchestra and chorus, for the film's soundtrack album.)

According to Crosby's nephew, Howard Crosby, "I once asked Uncle Bing about the most difficult thing he ever had to do during his entertainment career… He said in December, 1944, he was in a USO show with Bob Hope and the Andrews Sisters. They did an outdoor show in northern France… he had to stand there and sing 'White Christmas' with 100,000 G.I.s in tears without breaking down himself. Of course, a lot of those boys were killed in the Battle of the Bulge a few days later."

The version most often heard today on the radio during the Christmas season is the 1947 re-recording. The 1942 master was damaged due to frequent use. Crosby re-recorded the track on March 19, 1947, accompanied again by the Trotter Orchestra and the Darby Singers, with every effort made to reproduce the original recording session. The re-recording is recognizable by the addition of flutes and celesta in the beginning.

Although Crosby dismissed his role in the song's success, saying later that "a jackdaw with a cleft palate could have sung it successfully", he was associated with it for the rest of his career.

=== Sales figures ===
Crosby's "White Christmas" single has been credited with selling 50 million copies, the most by any release and therefore it is the biggest-selling single worldwide of all time. By 1968, it had already sold thirty million. The Guinness Book of World Records 2009 Edition lists the song as a 100-million seller, encompassing all versions of the song, including albums. According to analysis of PRS for Music figures, it was estimated that the song generates £328,000 of royalties per year.

Crosby's holiday collection Merry Christmas was first released as an LP in 1949, and has never been out of print since.

There has been confusion and debate on whether Crosby's record is the best-selling single, due to a lack of information on sales of "White Christmas", because Crosby's recording was released before the advent of the modern-day US and UK singles charts. However, after careful research, Guinness World Records in 2007 concluded that, worldwide, Crosby's recording of "White Christmas" has sold at least 50 million copies, and that Elton John's recording of "Candle in the Wind 1997" has sold 33 million. However, an update in the 2009 edition of the book decided to further help settle the controversy amicably by naming both John's and Crosby's songs to be "winners" by stating that John's recording is the "best-selling single since UK and US singles charts began in the 1950s", while maintaining that "the best-selling single of all time was released before the first pop charts", and that this distinction belongs to "White Christmas", which it says "was listed as the world's best-selling single in the first-ever Guinness Book of Records (published in 1955) and—remarkably—still retains the title more than 50 years later."

=== Legacy ===
In 1974, the 1942 recording of the song by Bing Crosby and The Ken Darby Singers on Decca Records was inducted into the Grammy Hall of Fame.

During the Vietnam War, a recording was broadcast on Armed Forces Radio on April 30, 1975, as a secret, pre-arranged signal precipitating the U.S. evacuation from Saigon.

In 1999, National Public Radio included it in the "NPR 100", which sought to compile the one hundred most important American musical works of the 20th century. Crosby's version of the song also holds the distinction of being ranked No. 2 on the "Songs of the Century" list, behind only Judy Garland's "Over the Rainbow", as voted by members of the RIAA. In 2002, the original 1942 version was one of 50 historically significant recordings chosen that year by the Library of Congress to be added to the National Recording Registry. In 2004, it ranked No. 5 on AFI's 100 Years...100 Songs survey of top tunes in American cinema.

In a UK poll in December 2012, "White Christmas" was voted fourth (behind "Fairytale of New York", "I Wish It Could Be Christmas Everyday" and "Merry Xmas Everybody") on the ITV television special The Nation's Favourite Christmas Song.

== Formats and track listing ==
These are the formats and track listings of single releases of "White Christmas".

10-inch shellac single – U.S. (Decca – 18429) 1942
No.	Title	Writer(s)	Length
1.	"White Christmas"	Irving Berlin	3:02
2.	"Let's Start The New Year Right"	Irving Berlin

10-inch shellac single – U.S. (Decca – 23778) 1947
No.	Title	Writer(s)	Length
1.	"White Christmas"	Irving Berlin	3:04
2.	"God Bless Ye Merry Gentlemen"	traditional

7-inch vinyl single – U.S. (Decca – 23778) 1950
No.	Title	Writer(s)	Length
1.	"White Christmas"	Irving Berlin	3:04
2.	"God Bless Ye Merry Gentlemen"	traditional

7-inch vinyl single – U.S. (MCA – 65022)
No.	Title	Writer(s)	Length
1.	"White Christmas"	Irving Berlin	3:04
2.	"God Bless Ye Merry Gentlemen"	traditional

CD single – UK (MCA Records – MCSTD48105)
No.	Title	Writer(s)	Length
1.	"White Christmas"	Irving Berlin	3:06
2.	"Auld Lang Syne"	Robert Burns (lyrics), Scots folk melody	1:38
3.	"Peace on Earth/Little Drummer Boy"	Larry Grossman, Ian Fraser, Buz Kohan / Katherine K. Davis, Henry Onorati, Harry Simeone	2:37

== Original verse ==
Irving Berlin's opening verse, contrasting the sunshine and warmth of Christmas in California with the narrator's desire for a traditional holiday setting of winter snow, is often dropped in recordings. It is included on A Christmas Gift for You from Phil Spector, sung by Darlene Love; on Barbra Streisand's A Christmas Album; on the Carpenters' Christmas Portrait, sung by Karen Carpenter; on Neil Diamond's The Christmas Album; on Bette Midler's Cool Yule; on Libera's Christmas Album; and on Crash Test Dummies' Jingle All the Way.

The sun is shining, the grass is green,
The orange and palm trees sway.
There's never been such a day
in Beverly Hills, L.A.
But it's December the twenty-fourth,—
And I am longing to be up North—

== Charts ==
=== Bing Crosby version ===
Chart (1958–2026)	Peak position
Australia (ARIA)	29
Austria (Ö3 Austria Top 40)	38
Canada Hot 100 (Billboard)	19
Czech Republic Singles Digital (ČNS IFPI)	41
Denmark (Tracklisten)	27
Finland (Suomen virallinen lista)	41
Finnish Airplay (Radiosoitto)	51
Germany (GfK)	39
Global 200 (Billboard)	21
Global 200 (Billboard) with V	72
Greece International (IFPI)	23
Hungary (Stream Top 40)	20
Ireland (IRMA)	24
Italy (FIMI)	27
Japan Hot 100 (Billboard)	52
Latvia Streaming (LaIPA)	14
Lithuania (AGATA)	40
Netherlands (Dutch Top 40 Tipparade)	23
Netherlands (Global Top 40)	27
Netherlands (Single Top 100)	4
New Zealand (Recorded Music NZ)	24
Norway (IFPI Norge)	74
Portugal (AFP)	64
Slovakia Singles Digital (ČNS IFPI)	28
South Korea (Circle) with V	180
Sweden (Sverigetopplistan)	8
Switzerland (Schweizer Hitparade)	40
UK Singles (Official Charts)	5
US Billboard Hot 100	12
US Billboard Hot 100 with V	93
US Adult Contemporary (Billboard)	3
US Holiday 100 (Billboard)	5
US Rolling Stone Top 100	16

=== Michael Bublé version ===
Chart (2011–2026)	Peak position
Australia (ARIA) with Shania Twain	50
Austria (Ö3 Austria Top 40) Solo version	32
Canada Hot 100 (Billboard) with Bing Crosby	72
Canada Hot 100 (Billboard) with Shania Twain	86
Canada AC (Billboard) with Bing Crosby	45
Canada AC (Billboard) with Shania Twain	12
Canada AC (Billboard) 2019 version	12
Croatia International Airplay (Top lista) with Shania Twain	23
Estonia Airplay (TopHit)	51
France (SNEP)	179
Germany (GfK) with Shania Twain	31
Global 200 (Billboard) with Shania Twain	135
Hungary (Single Top 40)	38
Hungary (Stream Top 40) with Shania Twain	13
Italy (FIMI) Solo version	16
Italy (FIMI) with Shania Twain	53
Netherlands (Single Top 100) with Shania Twain	36
Portugal (AFP)	58
Sweden (Sverigetopplistan) with Shania Twain	35
Switzerland (Schweizer Hitparade) with Shania Twain	33
US Bubbling Under Hot 100 (Billboard) with Bing Crosby	24
US Adult Contemporary (Billboard) with Bing Crosby	2
US Adult Contemporary (Billboard) with Shania Twain	10
US Holiday 100 (Billboard) with Shania Twain	22
US Holiday Digital Song Sales (Billboard) with Bing Crosby	5
US Holiday Digital Song Sales (Billboard) Solo version	49
US Holiday Digital Song Sales (Billboard) 2019 version	7

=== Glee Cast version ===
Chart (2012–19)	Peak position
UK Singles (Official Charts)	98
US Holiday Digital Song Sales (Billboard)	29

=== Gwen Stefani version ===
Chart performance for "White Christmas"
Chart (2017–2019)	Peak position
Canada AC (Billboard)	39
Slovakia Airplay (ČNS IFPI)	86
UK Singles (Official Charts)	62
US Holiday Digital Song Sales (Billboard)	27

=== Meghan Trainor version ===
==== Weekly charts ====
Chart (2020–2025)	Peak position
Poland (Polish Airplay Top 100)	62
US Adult Contemporary (Billboard)	1
US Adult Pop Airplay (Billboard)	39

==== Year-end charts ====
Chart (2021)	Position
US Adult Contemporary (Billboard)	29

== Certifications and sales ==
=== Bing Crosby version ===
Region	Certification	Certified units/sales
Australia (ARIA)	Platinum	70,000^{‡}
Denmark (IFPI Danmark)	Platinum	90,000^{‡}
Germany (BVMI)	Gold	300,000^{‡}
Italy (FIMI)	Gold	50,000^{‡}
Portugal (AFP)	Gold	12,000^{‡}
Sweden (GLF)	Gold	25,000^{^}
United Kingdom (BPI)	Silver	1,047,349
United Kingdom (BPI) Digital sales since 2019	Platinum	600,000^{‡}
United States	—	10-12,000,000
Streaming
Greece (IFPI Greece)	Gold	1,000,000^{†}
Summaries
North America	—	25,000,000
^{^} Shipments figures based on certification alone.^{‡} Sales+streaming figures based on certification alone.^{†} Streaming-only figures based on certification alone.

=== Michael Bublé version ===
Region	Certification	Certified units/sales
Germany (BVMI)	Gold	300,000^{‡}
Italy (FIMI)	Platinum	70,000^{‡}
New Zealand (RMNZ)	Gold	15,000^{‡}
Portugal (AFP)	Gold	12,000^{‡}
United Kingdom (BPI) with Shania Twain	Gold	400,000^{‡}
^{‡} Sales+streaming figures based on certification alone.

== Other versions ==
There have been more than 500 recorded versions of the song, in several different languages. The following have received some charting success.

Gordon Jenkins and his Orchestra (with Bob Carroll on lead vocal) released a version on Capitol Records that reached No. 16 on Billboard magazine's pop singles chart in 1942 and Charlie Spivak and his Orchestra (with Garry Stevens on lead vocal) released a version for Columbia Records that reached No. 18 on Billboard's pop singles chart as did Freddy Martin and his Orchestra (with Clyde Rogers on lead vocal) for RCA Victor, reaching No. 20 on Billboard's pop singles chart (and again in December 1945, reaching No. 16).

In 1944, Frank Sinatra with a backing orchestration under the direction of Axel Stordahl for Columbia, reached No. 7 on Billboard's pop singles chart (two more times: December 1945, No. 5; December 1946, No. 6) Jo Stafford reached No. 9 on Billboard's pop singles chart in 1946, with backing vocals by the Lyn Murray Singers and backing orchestration by Paul Weston for Capitol. Eddy Howard and his Orchestra released a version on the Majestic label that reached No. 21 on Billboard's pop singles chart the same year while Perry Como, with backing orchestration by Lloyd Shaffer, recorded the song for RCA Victor in 1947 and reached No. 23 on Billboard's pop singles chart; Como recorded a stereo version of the song in 1959.

In 1949, The Ravens peaked at No. 9 on Billboard's Rhythm & Blues Records chart in January 1949 on National Records. while Ernest Tubb, with female backing vocals by The Troubadettes on Decca, peaked at No. 7 on Billboard's Country & Western Records chart.

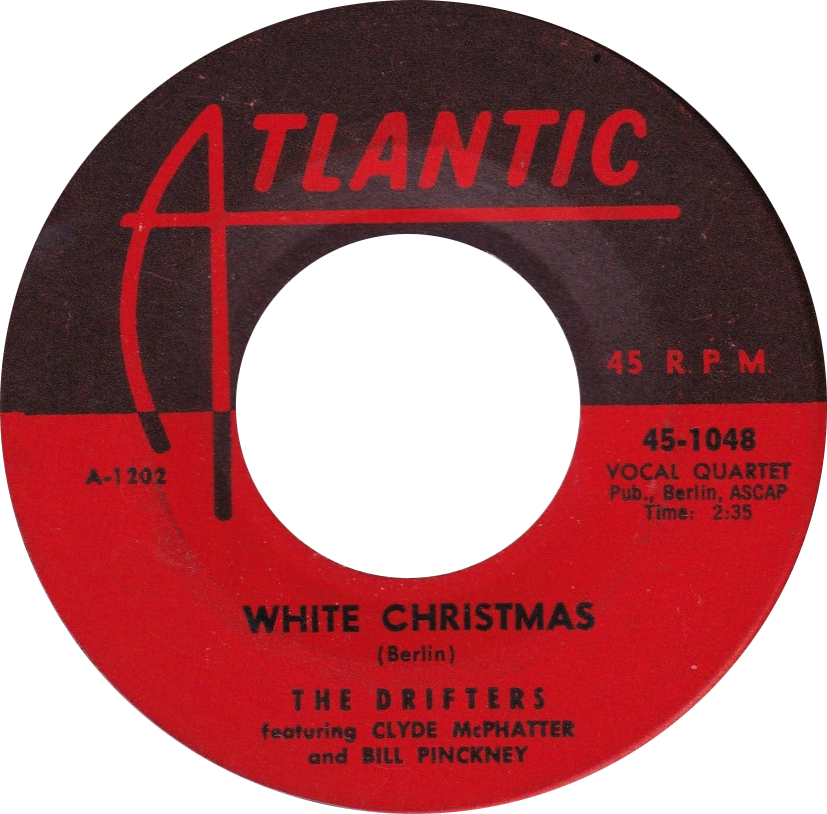
US 7-inch vinyl release (red variant) of The Drifters recording

In 1952, Mantovani and his orchestra reached No. 23 on Billboard's pop singles chart while The Drifters showcased the talents of lead singer Clyde McPhatter and the bass vocals of Bill Pinkney in 1954, peaking at No. 2 on Billboard's Rhythm & Blues Records chart. It returned to the same chart in the next two years. In February 1954, the Drifters recorded "White Christmas", which was released that November. While the song became a No. 5 R&B hit in 1954, its popularity remained in the black community. The Drifters' rendition of this song can be heard in the films Home Alone and The Santa Clause.

In 1953, Bing Crosby sang "White Christmas" in a film made in Paris as part of The Ford 50th Anniversary Show, a two-hour television special broadcast on NBC and CBS.

Andy Williams recorded the song for Columbia in 1963 on The Andy Williams Christmas Album, where it reached No. 1 on Billboard's weekly Christmas Singles chart. It was released in 1968 on Atco Records as a posthumous single from Otis Redding, and reached No. 12 on the Christmas Singles chart. In 1980, Darts's version peaked at No. 48 on the UK singles chart. In 1985, Keith Harris and his puppet Orville the Duck covered the song, later becoming their second and final UK top 40 hit the following year.

Michael Bolton performed it on his 1992 non-holiday album, Timeless: The Classics, where it peaked at No. 73 on Billboard's Hot 100 Airplay chart in January 1993. Garth Brooks version included on his first holiday album, Beyond the Season, peaked at No. 70 on Billboard's Hot Country Singles & Tracks chart in January 1995. In 1998 Martina McBride recorded it for her album White Christmas, charting twice, reaching No. 75 on Billboard's Hot Country Singles & Tracks chart in 1999, and No. 62 on the same chart in 2000

Bette Midler's version, released on her non-holiday album, Bette Midler Sings the Rosemary Clooney Songbook, reached No. 15 on Billboard's Hot Adult Contemporary Tracks chart in 2003. The version released on Andrea Bocelli 2009 album, My Christmas, reached No. 16 on the Portuguese Singles Chart. Despite not being released as a single, Marco Mengoni's version, released on the compilation album X Factor – The Christmas Album, charted at No. 13 on the Italian Singles Chart based on digital downloads of the track.

Lady Gaga's version was released on her live EP A Very Gaga Holiday in 2011. It entered the UK Singles Chart at number 87, for the week ending December 3, 2011. The same version also entered the Belgium (Flanders) Singles Chart at number 86, for the week ending dated December 24, 2011, and the Japan Hot 100 singles at number 93. Gaga's cover features an extra verse about a snowman.

The Glee cast's version of the song, sung by Darren Criss and Chris Colfer, entered the UK charts for the first time in 2018, four years after its release, at No. 98.

In 2020, a version by Meghan Trainor, featuring Seth MacFarlane, went to No. 1 on Billboard's Adult Contemporary chart.

== See also ==
- List of best-selling sheet music
- List of best-selling singles
