= Give Yourself a Hand =

Studio album by Crash Test Dummies
- Released: March 23, 1999
- Recorded: 1998
- Studios: Rocket Carousel Studios, One on One South and David Abell Piano Studio, Los Angeles
- Genre: Trip hop
- Length: 38:35
- Label: ViK.
- Producer: Greg Wells

Crash Test Dummies chronology
A Worm's Life (1996)	Give Yourself a Hand (1999)	I Don't Care That You Don't Mind (2001)

Singles from Give Yourself a Hand
- 1. "Keep a Lid on Things" Released: January 1999; 2. "Get You in the Morning" Released: June 1999; 3. "Give Yourself a Hand (Promotional Only)" Released: June 1999

Give Yourself a Hand is the fourth album by Crash Test Dummies, released in 1999 through ViK. Recordings. It is their final album for BMG. The album spawned a quirky hit "Keep a Lid on Things". The Times review of the album described it as "the best music of their career...an album of rare wit and vitality."

== Background ==
For their third album, A Worm's Life, Crash Test Dummies were given a lot of creative freedom, thanks to the success of God Shuffled His Feet. However, the album was considered a disappointment, and the band's label, BMG, pressured the band to immediately write a follow-up. During initial song-writing the band wrote and recorded 35 demos, all of which were rejected by BMG. The demos from these sessions would be shelved until 2011 when a selection of them were released on the compilation album Demo-litions.

In 1998, the band proceeded to write and record the new album. In October of that year the band shared on their website that the album would be named Keep a Lid on Things. Within two weeks, it was reported by the band that the title had been changed to Give Yourself a Hand. At the time, Brad Roberts had moved to Harlem and was influenced by the local music. He began writing an album inspired by soul and hip-hop beats, and recorded some vocal parts in falsetto for the first time. The style of the album can also be attributed to the contributions from co-writer/producer Greg Wells.

The band's keyboardist Ellen Reid is featured on lead vocals on several tracks, including the album's second single, "Get You in the Morning".

== Track listing ==
All tracks are written by Brad Roberts and Greg Wells except as noted.

No.	Title	Writer(s)	Length
1.	"Keep a Lid on Things"		2:45
2.	"A Cigarette Is All You Get"		2:27
3.	"Just Chillin'"		3:32
4.	"I Want to Par-tay!"		2:29
5.	"Give Yourself a Hand"		3:00
6.	"Get You in the Morning"		2:57
7.	"Pissed With Me"		3:09
8.	"Just Shoot Me, Baby"		3:34
9.	"A Little Something"	Ellen Reid, Roberts, Wells	4:36
10.	"I Love Your Goo"	Roberts	3:31
11.	"Aching to Sneeze"	Roberts	3:23
12.	"Playing Dead"		3:15

== Personnel ==
=== Crash Test Dummies ===
- Brad Roberts – lead vocals, lead and rhythm guitars
- Ellen Reid – piano, keyboards, backing vocals, lead vocals on "Just Chillin'", "Get You in The Morning" and "A Little Something"
- Benjamin Darvill – harmonica, rhythm guitar
- Dan Roberts – bass guitar
- Mitch Dorge – drums, percussion, programming

=== Guests/production ===
- Greg Wells – keyboards, programming
- David K – piano on "Playing Dead"
- David Piltch – upright bass on "Just Chillin"

== Reception ==
Professional ratings
Review scores
Source	Rating
Allmusic	3/5 stars
Entertainment Weekly	C−

The album received mixed reviews. Allmusic writer Paul Pearson gave the album 3 out of 5 stars and states that "Give Yourself a Hand redefines the Dummies sound with lightly applied techno strokes, not far off from Everything but the Girl's classic Walking Wounded. Some textures here are stunning, with electric piano flourishes and hip-hop drumbeat samples that sound tunefully great. The Dummies exhibit an unexpected knack for drum'n'bass shadings in 'Pissed with Me' and 'A Little Something.' Unfortunately, the beauty of the surroundings can't compensate for Roberts' singularly strange lyrical 'talents.'" However, he goes on to state that "the songs sung by Ellen Reid fare much better, especially the beautiful 'A Little Something,' which at least gives voice to vulnerability."

== Charts ==
=== Weekly ===
Chart (1999)	Peak position
Canada Top Albums/CDs (RPM)	14
German Albums (Offizielle Top 100)	95

=== Year-end ===
Chart (1999)	Position
Canadian Albums (RPM)	100
