= Now You See Her =

2010 single by Crash Test Dummies

Single by Crash Test Dummies

from the album Oooh La La!
- Released: September 2010
- Recorded: Water Music, Hoboken, New Jersey
- Genre: Alternative rock, art pop, lounge, electro swing
- Label: Deep Fried Records
- Songwriters: Brad Roberts, Stewart Lerman
- Producer: Stewart Lerman

Crash Test Dummies singles chronology
"And It's Beautiful" (2010)	"Now You See Her" (2010)

"Now You See Her, Now You Don't" is a song by Canadian group Crash Test Dummies and was the second promotional single from their 2010 album Oooh La La!. As with most songs from the album, the song is based on an Optigan melody, with this song emulating a Big band swing style.

== Lyrics and interpretation ==
The song has been described as a "quirky little tune about an uncatchable girl" and is considered to be one of the most surprising and best songs on the album

It's from the lyrics of this song where the album gets the title Oooh La-La!.

== Music video ==
The music video for the song is directed by Lynne Harty and uses a pixilation animation effect. The action of the video is displayed in a center partition and consists of various women, along with Brad Roberts, posing and dancing in front of the camera.
