= Puss 'n' Boots (album) =

Puss 'N' Boots

Studio album by Crash Test Dummies
- Released: October 21, 2003
- Recorded: Magic Shop, New York City
- Genre: Alternative rock
- Length: 45:37
- Label: Cha-Ching
- Producer: Stuart Cameron

Crash Test Dummies chronology
Jingle All the Way (2002)	Puss 'N' Boots (2003)	Songs of the Unforgiven (2004)

Singles from Puss 'N' Boots
- 1. "Flying Feeling (Promotional Only)" Released: October 2003

Puss 'N' Boots is the sixth studio album by Crash Test Dummies, released in 2003. The album began life as a Brad Roberts solo project. While the lyrics were written by Brad Roberts, most of the music was written by Stuart Cameron. Ellen Reid sang backing vocals and Dan Roberts played bass, though much of the music was performed by other musicians.

== Reception ==
Professional ratings
Review scores
Source	Rating
Allmusic	3/5 stars
Winnipeg Sun	(Fair)

The album received generally mixed reviews. Allmusic writer James Christopher Monger gave the album 3 out of 5 stars and states that "the smoky rhythms and wah-wah guitar that permeate Puss 'n' Boots reflect Roberts' willingness to experience a place – he currently resides in Harlem – and to covet and use those experiences in his writing. However, it's the simple, sparse, and honest It'll Never Leave You Alone, a winking look at the pros and cons of chemical indulgence, that leaves the listener with the clearest window into this shape-shifting jester's soul.". In addition, Darryl Sterdan of the Winnipeg Sun states that "with their chicken-scratch wah-wah guitars, sexy backup vocals, slinky slow-burning grooves and swirly production flourishes, these cuts are more earthy and soulful than anything the Dummies ever did, not to mention catchier and more accessible than most of Roberts' recent, idiosyncratic output. Still, from the love-'em-and-leave-'em confessions of It's a Shame to the sex-toy metaphor Triple-Master-Blaster to the good-riddance breakup song Bye-Bye Baby, Goodbye, Puss 'N' Boots is clearly anything but your typical G-rated bedtime story.".

== Track listing ==
All lyrics are written by Brad Roberts; all music is composed by Brad Roberts & Stuart Cameron.

No.	Title	Length
1.	"It's a Shame"	4:14
2.	"Everything Is Better with Me"	3:33
3.	"Triple Master Blaster"	2:51
4.	"I'm the Man (That You Are Not)"	3:33
5.	"Stupid Same"	2:59
6.	"I'll See What I Can Do"	3:19
7.	"Your Gun Won't Fire"	3:51
8.	"Flying Feeling"	3:24
9.	"If Ya Wanna Know"	3:53
10.	"Bye Bye Baby, Goodbye"	3:01
11.	"I Never Try That Hard"	4:47
12.	"Never Bother Looking Back"	2:58
13.	"It'll Never Leave You Alone"	3:20

== Personnel ==
- Brad Roberts – vocals
- Ellen Reid – backing vocals
- Dan Roberts – bass guitar
- Stuart Cameron – acoustic and electric guitars, lap steel, twelve-string guitar, keyboards, backing vocals on "I'll See What I Can Do", programming/loops on "Your Gun Won't Fire"
- Chris Brown – Wurlitzer piano, mellotron, clavinet, organ, piano
- Ethan Eubanks – drums, loops, percussion
- Wijnand Jansveld – bass guitar on "Triple Master Blaster"
- Tina Maddigan – backing vocals on "I'm the Man (That You Are Not)," "Flying Feeling," and "Bye Bye Baby, Goodbye"
- John Allen Cameron – twelve-string guitar on "Stupid Same"
- Jamie Staub – programming/loops on "Your Gun Won't Fire," congas on "I Never Try That Hard"
- New York City – city Sounds on "It'll Never Leave You Alone"
