= Songs of the Unforgiven =

Crash Test Dummies album

Studio album by Crash Test Dummies
- Released: October 12, 2004
- Recorded: Sacred Heart Studios, Duluth, Minnesota
- Genre: Folk rock
- Length: 40:28
- Label: Deep Fried
- Producer: Scott Harding

Crash Test Dummies chronology
Puss 'n' Boots (2003)	Songs of the Unforgiven (2004)	The Cape Breton Lobster Bash Series (2007)

Singles from Songs of the Unforgiven
- 1. "The Unforgiven Ones (Promotional Only)" Released: October 2004; 2. "And So Will Always Be (Promotional Only)" Released: October 2004

Songs of the Unforgiven is the seventh studio album recorded by Crash Test Dummies, released in 2004.

== Background ==
Almost immediately after recording Puss 'n' Boots, Brad Roberts, Ellen Reid and Dan Roberts proceeded to prepare recording the follow-up, with Roberts acknowledging he went "through this phase where I was extremely prolific and I wrote like three records worth of material in a space of months."

The band pursued a decisively raw, acoustic, stripped-down sound for Songs of the Unforgiven, and turned to the Internet in search of a recording studio that featured a pipe organ. By Googling "recording studios" plus "pipe organ", the first result revealed Sacred Heart Studios in Duluth, Minnesota: a church originally constructed in 1894 that was later abandoned and eventually restored and turned into a venue for concerts. Having discovered Sacred Heart Recording Studio included a 1493-pipe, Felgemaker pipe-organ, the band drove to Duluth and recorded the album the following January.

The album is decidedly apocalyptic thematically, featuring lyrics replete with Biblical references and imagery. Other unconventional instruments appear on the record, including the harp and kettle drums.

Suzzy Roche (of female vocal group "The Roches" fame) provides vocals on the album's three sonnets.

== Reception ==
Professional ratings
Review scores
Source	Rating
Allmusic	4/5 stars
Winnipeg Sun	4/5 stars

The album resulted in the band receiving their best reviews since God Shuffled His Feet. Allmusic writer Rob Theakston gave the album 4 out of 5 stars and states that "with the Dummies stripped of all the electronic experimentation and quirky, Shel Silverstein-esque lyrics that hindered their past few releases, the haunting, sparse acoustic instrumentation makes a welcome return to the forefront of the songwriting process. This only reinforces and complements Roberts' existentially bereft baritone folk tales to their fullest potential. The sonnets used for lyrics are some of the Crash Test Dummies' darkest and most brooding in their entire catalog, talking tales of murder, sinister deeds, punishment, sin, and death. Songs of the Unforgiven is the record die-hard fans have been patiently waiting for, and it's outstanding.". In addition, Darryl Sterdan of the Winnipeg Sun, who also gave the album 4 out of 5 stars, states that the "over swirling pump organs, slowly strummed guitars and molasses-slow grooves, the baritone Roberts sombrely intones psalms of death, darkness and delivery, coming off like a cross between Leonard Cohen, Nick Cave, Tom Waits and Elmer Gantry. And the brooding neo-classical folk hymns of Songs of the Unforgiven come off as his most sincere, spiritual thoughts to date."

== Track listing ==
All tracks are written by Brad Roberts except as noted.

No.	Title	Writer(s)	Length
1.	"Prelude"	Chris Brown, Roberts	0:19
2.	"Sonnet 1 (And When the Sun Goes Down)"		2:32
3.	"And So Will Always Be"		3:17
4.	"The Unforgiven Ones"		2:54
5.	"Interlude 1"	Brown, Roberts	0:23
6.	"Come Down to the Sinkhole"		2:35
7.	"Is the Spell Really Broken?"		3:53
8.	"Everlasting Peace"		2:39
9.	"Sonnet 2 (And Back in Ages Past)"		2:41
10.	"The Beginning of the End"		3:00
11.	"Interlude 2"	Brown, Roberts	0:37
12.	"You've Had Your Run"		3:22
13.	"There Is No Final Winner"		2:13
14.	"You've Done It Once Again"		3:46
15.	"Sonnet 3 (The Cold Is Here)"		2:04
16.	"The Wicked and the Evil"		3:03
17.	"Postlude"	Brown, Roberts	1:17

== Personnel ==
- Brad Roberts – vocals, acoustic guitar on "There Is No Final Winner"
- Ellen Reid – backing vocals
- Dan Roberts – bass guitar
- Suzzy Roche – backing vocals, vocals on "Sonnet 1," "There Is No Final Winner," and "Sonnet 3"
- Chris Brown – pipe organ, pump organ, piano, Wurlitzer electric piano, accordion, harmonium on "The Beginning of the End"
- Scott Harding – acoustic and electric guitars, cymbals on "Sonnet 1," vibraphone on "Everlasting Peace," backing vocals on "Is the Spell Really Broken?"
- Andrew Hall – upright bass
- Drew Glackin – acoustic guitar, lap steel guitar, bass guitar, resonator guitar on "There Is No Final Winner," tremolo bass on "Sonnet 3"
- Jane Scarpantoni – cello
- David Mansfield – banjo, violin
- Park Stickney – harp
- Mimi Parker – drums on "The Unforgiven Ones"
- Alan Sparhawk – electric guitar on "Come Down to the Sinkhole"
- Todd McMillon – church bell on "The Beginning of the End"
