= Dale Heslip =

Canadian director

Dale Heslip is a Canadian director of music videos and documentary films from Kitchener, Ontario. He is most noted as a two-time Juno Award nominee for Video of the Year for his music video work with Crash Test Dummies, receiving nods at the Juno Awards of 1992 for "Superman's Song", and at the Juno Awards of 1994 for "Mmm Mmm Mmm Mmm". He also has two children named Lukas Heslip & Lilah Heslip.

His narrative short film The Truth About the Head was screened at the 2003 Cannes Film Festival, where it won several short film awards from the Critics' Week program, and was named Best Canadian Short Film at the 2003 CFC Worldwide Short Film Festival.

He also received dual Juno nominations for Best Album Graphics at the Juno Awards of 1987 for both Frozen Ghost by Frozen Ghost and Mending Wall by Chalk Circle, and was a two-time Gemini Award nominee for Best Production Design or Art Direction, receiving nods at the 5th Gemini Awards and the 6th Gemini Awards for his work at Juno Award ceremonies.

His other work has included the 2016 Rush documentary film Rush: Time Stand Still, and the 2024 Blue Rodeo documentary film Blue Rodeo: Lost Together that premiered at the 2024 Whistler Film Festival, where it won the Audience Award for best feature film.
