= The Ghosts That Haunt Me =

Studio album by Crash Test Dummies
- Released: April 9, 1991
- Recorded: Wayne Finucan Studio (Winnipeg, Manitoba)
- Genre: Folk rock
- Length: 36:59
- Labels: BMG; Arista
- Producer: Steve Berlin

Crash Test Dummies chronology
Demo Tape 2 (1989)	The Ghosts That Haunt Me (1991)	God Shuffled His Feet (1993)

Singles from The Ghosts That Haunt Me
- 1. "Superman's Song" Released: March 1991

The Ghosts That Haunt Me is the 1991 debut album by the Canadian folk rock group Crash Test Dummies. It featured their hit "Superman's Song".

The artwork featured on the cover, and throughout the liner notes, is by 19th-century illustrator Gustav Doré and is from The Rime of the Ancient Mariner by Samuel Taylor Coleridge. The same painting would later be used for black metal band Judas Iscariot's final album To Embrace the Corpses Bleeding, in 2002.

Art is also taken from the French novelist Nicolas Restif de la Bretonne's The Discovery of the Austral Continent by a Flying Man, 1781.

== Commercial performance ==
The Ghosts That Haunt Me was successful, selling 400,000 copies in Canada and 200,000 copies in the United States by November, 1993.

== Reception ==
Professional ratings
Review scores
Source	Rating
AllMusic	3.5/5 stars

AllMusic writer Stephen Thomas Erlewine called The Ghosts That Haunt Me "a fine debut album by the ever-smug, collegiate, folk-pop humorists."

== Track listing ==
All tracks are written by Brad Roberts, except as noted.

No.	Title	Writer(s)	Length
1.	"Winter Song"		4:01
2.	"Comin' Back Soon (The Bereft Man's Song)"		4:27
3.	"Superman's Song"		4:31
4.	"The Country Life"		4:02
5.	"Here on Earth (I'll Have My Cake)"		3:03
6.	"The Ghosts That Haunt Me"		3:45
7.	"Thick-Necked Man"	Benjamin Darvill	3:19
8.	"Androgynous"	Paul Westerberg	2:36
9.	"The Voyage"		3:13
10.	"At My Funeral"		4:02

== Personnel ==
- Brad Roberts – lead vocals, acoustic and electric guitars
- Ellen Reid – piano, keyboards, accordion, tin whistle, backing vocals
- Benjamin Darvill – mandolin, harmonica
- Dan Roberts – bass guitar
- Vince Lambert – drums
- Steve Berlin – percussion
- Bob Doige – recorder on "At My Funeral"
- Greg Leisz – pedal steel on "The Voyage"
- Garth Reid – banjo on "Comin' Back Soon"
- Lynn Selwood – cello on "Superman's Song"
- Bill Zulak – violin on "Winter Song", "The Country Life" and "At My Funeral".
