= As Trees Walking =

Studio album by Mitch Dorge
- Released: 2002
- Genre: Instrumental, new-age
- Label: AMi/TMi Productions
- Producer: Mitch Dorge

As Trees Walking is the 2002 debut studio solo album by Mitch Dorge. It won the Prairie Music Award for Outstanding Instrumental Recording.

== Track listing ==
1. As Trees Walking
2. Cry
3. Ketamine
4. A Darker Side of Life
5. I’ll Always Love You
6. I’ll Always Love You (Original Version)

== Personnel ==
- Mitch Dorge — keyboards, piano, percussion, programming
