= Ellen Reid =

Canadian musician (born 1966)

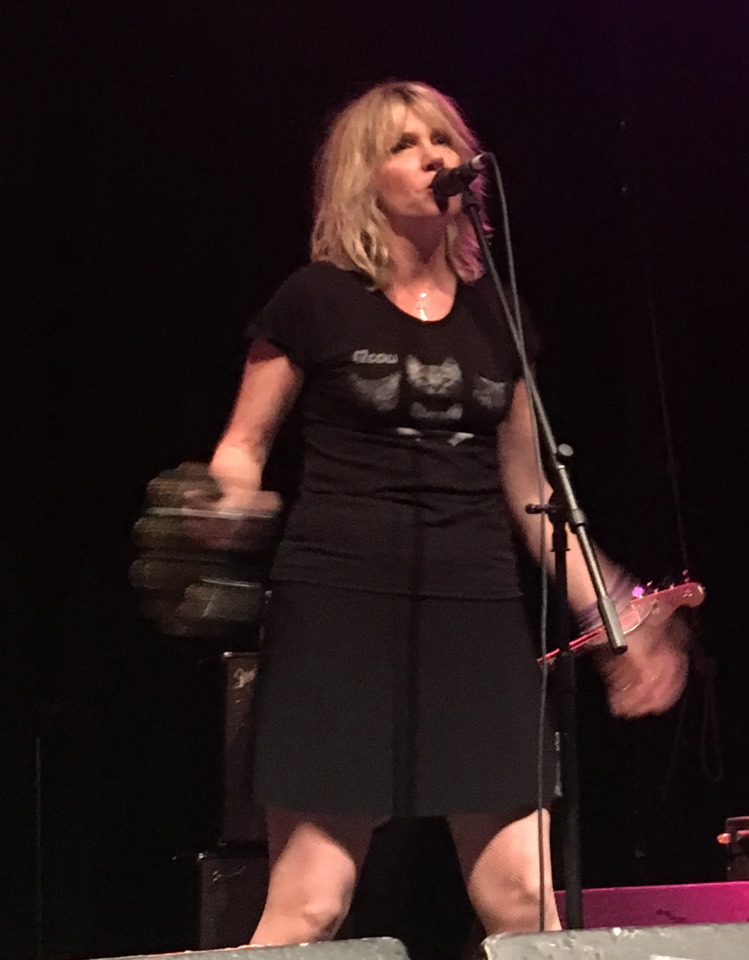
- Reid performing with Crash Test Dummies in 2019

Background information
- Born: Ellen Lorraine Reid; 14 July 1966 (age 60); Selkirk, Manitoba, Canada
- Genre: Rock
- Occupation: Musician
- Instruments: Vocals; keyboards; accordion
- Years active: 1988–present
- Labels: Arista; ViK.; Cha-Ching; Deep Fried

Ellen Lorraine Reid (born 14 July 1966) is a Canadian musician. She provides backing vocals, piano, keyboards and accordion for the Canadian rock band Crash Test Dummies.

== Early life and education ==
Reid was born and grew up in Selkirk, Manitoba. She studied piano as a child, and later attended the University of Winnipeg.

== Career ==
While studying in Winnipeg in the late 1980s, Reid joined the band Brad Roberts and the St. James Rhythm Pigs who were playing in local taverns. She mainly played piano and sang backup vocals behind lead singer Brad Roberts. The group, renamed Crash Test Dummies, performed at the Winnipeg Folk Festival in 1989 and released an album, The Ghosts That Haunt Me, in 1991.

Reid has recorded with the Crash Test Dummies on all of their albums; on the band's fourth album, she sang lead vocals on "Just Chillin'", "Get You in the Morning" and "A Little Something". She also shared lead vocals with Roberts on the single B-sides "Filter Queen" and "Party's Over". She also sang lead during some concerts on "Samson and Delilah (If I Had My Way)" and on the hit "The Ballad of Peter Pumpkinhead", a cover of the XTC song.

In 2001, Reid released a solo album, Cinderellen. and toured in support of the album in early 2002.

In 2002, Reid took part in the recording of the Crash Test Dummies' Christmas album entitled Jingle All the Way. In 2004 she was also involved in the recording of the Dummies' Songs of the Unforgiven album.

Reid, Brad Roberts and Stuart Cameron continued to record together, and toured throughout 2010/2011 in support of the Crash Test Dummies album Oooh La La! The band came together again for tours in 2017 and 2018.

== Discography ==
=== Crash Test Dummies ===
- The Ghosts That Haunt Me (1991)
- God Shuffled His Feet (1993)
- A Worm's Life (1996)
- Give Yourself a Hand (1999)
- I Don't Care That You Don't Mind (2001)
- Jingle All the Way (2002)
- Puss 'n' Boots (2003)
- Songs of the Unforgiven (2004)
- Oooh La La! (2010)

=== Solo ===
- Cinderellen (2001)
