= A Lump of Coal =

Compilation album by Various artists
- Released: 1991-10-08
- Genre: Rock
- Length: 40:30
- Label: Dead Line, First Warning, RCA

Professional ratings
Review scores
| Source | Rating |
|---|---|
| Allmusic | 3/5 stars |

A Lump of Coal is an Australian compilation album of Christmas music produced in 1991 by Dead Line Records (Australia) and First Warning Records (U.S.) for RCA Records. While most of the artists from this disc remain unknown to most, Hoodoo Gurus, Crash Test Dummies, The Wedding Present, The Primitives, and Henry Rollins have all produced well-known albums and many of the other artists are popular amongst rock fans.

== Track listing ==
1. "Little Drummer Boy" – Hoodoo Gurus — 2:24
2. "The First Noel" – Crash Test Dummies — 3:42
3. "Step Into Christmas" – The Wedding Present (originally recorded by Elton John) — 4:48
4. "Blue X-mas (To Whom It May Concern)" – Drunken Boat (originally recorded by Miles Davis) — 4:19
5. "O Holy Night" – Divine Weeks — 4:52
6. "Bring a Torch, Jeanette, Isabella" – Carnival Art — 4:00
7. "Silent Night" – The Primitives — 2:12
8. "O Little Town of Bethlehem" – Young Fresh Fellows — 2:55
9. "Kings of Orient" – The Odds — 4:29
10. "Here Comes Santa Claus" – Clockhammer — 2:34
11. "'Twas the Night Before Christmas" – Henry Rollins — 4:08
