= Oooh La La! (Crash Test Dummies album) =

Studio album by Crash Test Dummies
- Released: May 11, 2010
- Recorded: Water Music, Hoboken, New Jersey
- Genres: Alternative rock; chamber pop; art pop; lounge; electro-swing; swing revival
- Length: 36:33
- Labels: Deep Fried; MRI
- Producer: Stewart Lerman

Crash Test Dummies chronology
The Best of Crash Test Dummies (2007)	Oooh La La! (2010)	Demo-litions: Cast-off Recordings 1996–97 (2011)

Singles from Oooh La La
- 1. "And It's Beautiful" Released: April 2010 (promotional-only release); 2. "Now You See Her" Released: September 2010 (promotional-only release)

Oooh La La! is the eighth studio album by Crash Test Dummies, released 11 May 2010 on Deep Fried Records, distributed by MRI Records. The songs on the album are inspired by the Optigan and Omnichord toy instruments.

== Background ==
The seeds for Oooh La La! were first planted when Brad Roberts and producer Stewart Lerman (Antony & the Johnsons, The Roches) became infatuated with vintage analog musical toys, particularly one manufactured by the Mattel company called the Optigan (an acronym for "optical organ"). Using celluloid discs, the Optigan projects the sounds of other instruments with different sets of keys triggering chords and individual notes. The discs, with names like "Nashville," "Swing It!" and "Guitar Boogie," rotate to produce different arrays of sounds. "Because we wrote using these discs, we were inspired to do things that we wouldn't have done," Roberts points out. "I don't write big band style, but all of a sudden I had this big band [on disc], so I'm writing in a genre that I normally wouldn't be writing in. I can't say enough about how great it is to write on these toys."

== Release ==
Brad Roberts originally stated that he planned to release the album as a digital-only release, since he couldn't afford the CD distribution costs (and he believed that CDs would be out of date by 2015). However, plans were later changed and Roberts signed a distribution deal with MRI Records, which distributed the album via Sony's RED Distribution division.

== Reception ==
Professional ratings
Review scores
Source	Rating
Allmusic	3/5 stars
Blogcritics	(Positive)
Consequence of Sound	3.5/5 stars
The Dallas Morning News	(B)
The Globe and Mail	2.5/4 stars
Metro Canada	2.5/5 stars
The Washington Post	(Positive)
Winnipeg Free Press	3/5 stars

The album received mixed to positive reviews upon its release. Matt Melis of Consequence of Sound gave the album 3½ out of 5 stars and commented on the extremely upbeat nature of the album stating that "it’s hard to believe this is the same man who wrote songs like At My Funeral and The Unforgiven Ones". Mario Tarradell of The Dallas Morning News gave the album a "B" and praised the album's use of toy instruments as ingenious. Brad Wheeler of The Globe and Mail gave the album 2½ out of 4 stars describing the album as "all good fun, except for the skedaddling country-swing of What I’m Famous For, where Roberts shows off the worst John Wayne imitation ever." Catherine P. Lewis of The Washington Post says that "Oooh La La! is not likely to add a second hit to the Dummies' legacy, but this quirky instrumentation certainly makes for a group that's enjoying itself." Jill Wilson of the Winnipeg Free Press gave the album 3 out of 5 stars and says that while the use of the Optigan is as gimmicky as it sounds, "fans of the band's early work may appreciate its offbeat qualities, not to mention Roberts' knack for appealing melodies and the album's orchestral feel." However, she also make a criticism that "Roberts too often pushes that mannered baritone of his into forced lows, as on the otherwise lovely '30s-tinged Not Today Baby, which is reduced to novelty status by his vocal mugging"

Graham Rockingham of Metro Canada gave the album 2½ out of 5 stars and, while he appreciated gentle folk rockers like Songbird, he states that "the project quickly goes off course as the Dummies try to adapt their trademark sound to something approaching retro riverboat cabaret."

== Track listing ==
All tracks are written by Brad Roberts and Stewart Lerman.

No.	Title	Length
1.	"Songbird"	3:45
2.	"You Said You'd Meet Me (In California)" (Early version previously appeared as a bonus track on The Best of Crash Test Dummies.)	3:25
3.	"And It's Beautiful"	3:25
4.	"Paralyzed"	3:32
5.	"The In-Between Place"	2:50
6.	"Not Today Baby"	3:10
7.	"Heart Of Stone"	4:52
8.	"Lake Bras d'Or"	2:25
9.	"What I'm Famous for"	2:57
10.	"Now You See Her"	4:06
11.	"Put a Face"	2:06

== Personnel ==
According to the official Crash Test Dummies website:

- Brad Roberts – lead vocals, acoustic guitar
- Ellen Reid – backing vocals, lead vocals on "Put a Face"
- Stewart Lerman – electric and acoustic guitars, bass, drums, organ, Optigan, Omnichord
- Steuart Smith – electric and acoustic guitars, bass, piano, mellotron, mandolin, banjo, Optigan
- Rob Morsberger – keyboards, vibraphone, accordion, melodica, theremin, string arrangements
- Jeremy Forbis – drums
- Suzanne Ornstein – violin, viola
- Debbie Assael – cello
- Pinky Weitzman – Stroh violin
