= I Don't Care That You Don't Mind =

Studio album by Crash Test Dummies
- Released: April 3, 2001
- Recorded: Feswick Productions (Nova Scotia); Greene St. Recording (New York City)
- Genre: Country rock
- Length: 46:45
- Label: Cha-Ching
- Producer: Scott Harding

Crash Test Dummies chronology
Give Yourself a Hand (1999)	I Don't Care That You Don't Mind (2001)	Jingle All the Way (2002)

Singles from I Don't Care That You Don't Mind
- 1. "Every Morning" Released: March 2001; 2. "On and On (Promotional Only)" Released: March 2001; 3. "The Day We Never Met" Released: July 2001

I Don't Care That You Don't Mind is the fifth studio album by Crash Test Dummies. The album began as a solo album for Brad Roberts, while he was recuperating in the town of Argyle, Nova Scotia after suffering a near-fatal car accident in September 2000. Crash Test Dummies' name was put on the album after the band (minus Benjamin Darvill) agreed to tour the album.

== Background ==
Shortly after completing a solo tour in Canada (one of the performances would later be released as "Crash Test Dude"), Brad Roberts bought a 1989 Cadillac for $2,000 in the autumn of 2000. Having not driven for a long time, Roberts explained that, along a winding back road in Yarmouth, County, Nova Scotia, he took a corner too fast, resulting in a near-fatal car accident that resulted in a broken left arm, cuts all across his face and multiple other injuries. Having kicked open the window and crawling halfway out of the car Roberts was stuck until a medic came and helped him out of the car. Roberts later would thank his "guardian angel" in the liner notes of "I Don't Care That You Don't Mind" and send him a bottle of rum to extend his deepest thanks.

While recuperating in Argyle, Nova Scotia, Roberts befriended Kent Greene, Dave Morton and Danny MacKenzie: lobster fishermen who also happened to be skilled musicians. Together, they recorded the bulk of what was originally intended to be Roberts' debut solo project.

However, Dummies' keyboardist Ellen Reid was later brought in to record backing vocals for a few tracks, and Dan Roberts agreed to tour with Brad. Shortly after, Reid and Mitch Dorge also agreed to tour the album and, as a result, the Crash Test Dummies name was put on the record.

This move did provoke some criticism from one band member. In 2001, Dummies' harmonica, mandolin and guitar player Benjamin Darvill sharply criticized Roberts in an interview with Crud Music Magazine:

It's ridiculous! He made a solo album and decided he couldn't sell it as "Brad Roberts", so he put Crash Test Dummies name on the front. That's not cool. And bless them; I still wish them luck, cause I don't want to sever any ties with them, we had a lot of good times together. But really I have no interest in following his orders anymore.

== Reception ==
Professional ratings
Review scores
Source	Rating
Allmusic	3/5 stars
Q	4/5 stars
Rolling Stone	(Unfavorable)
Winnipeg Sun	(Positive)

The album received fairly positive reviews. Allmusic writer Brad Kohlenstein gave the album 3 out of 5 stars and states that the band's "fifth album shows that they have no intention of going away and no particular intention of being famous again. While they have been criticized for trying too hard and forcing themselves to be something they're not, I Don't Care That You Don't Mind provides evidence that what was perceived as strained forethought may have simply been the band trying things out.

Continuing in their tradition of playing with different sounds, this album has a decidedly Southern feel. It's an experiment perhaps, but a successful one. The tracks range from cool, masculine ballads laced with steel guitar and reminiscent of Chris Isaak, to satirical drinkin' and shootin' songs. As if not to discriminate, they even throw in a little zydeco.".

In addition, Darryl Sterdan of the Winnipeg Sun states that "for a guy who spent years delivering his lyrics with an arched eyebrow and an ironic smirk, Roberts plays it surprisingly straight much of the time. And pulls it off surprisingly well. In fact, I Don't Care That You Don't Mind has some of his strongest, least contrived material in years".

== Track listing ==
All tracks are written by Brad Roberts except as noted.

No.	Title	Writer(s)	Length
1.	"I Don't Care That You Don't Mind"		4:04
2.	"On and On"		2:19
3.	"The Day We Never Met"		4:22
4.	"Let It Feel Like Something Else"		3:06
5.	"Little Secret"		2:27
6.	"Sittin' on a Tree Stump"	Roberts, Kent Greene, Dave Morton, Danny MacKenzie	2:06
7.	"Buzzin' Flies"		3:20
8.	"Yer Devil Ways"		4:41
9.	"Hangin' Tree"		2:52
10.	"Every Morning"	Roberts, John Ramos	2:52
11.	"Never Comin' Back"	Roberts, Kent Greene	2:36
12.	"Put Me in a Corner of Your Mind"		4:46
13.	"Shoot 'Em Up, Shoot 'Em Down"		4:54
14.	"I Never Fall Asleep at Night"		2:25

== Personnel ==
- Brad Roberts – vocals, guitars, ukulele
- Danny MacKenzie – drums, background vocals
- Dave Morton – acoustic bass, background vocals
- Kent Greene – guitars, background vocals
- Kenny Wollesen – drums, percussion
- Andrew Hall – acoustic bass
- Ellen Reid – vocals
- Chris Brown – hammond organ, electric piano, piano
- Drew Glackin – lap steel guitar, dobro guitar
- Brian Mitchell – accordion
- G.B. Gilmore – harmonica
- Jane Scarpantoni – cello
- Steve Bernstein – trumpet
- Scott Harding – guitar (10), background vocals
- John Ramos – background vocals (10)
- Chris Skiani, Scott Harding, Brad Roberts – background vocals (14)
- Spot the Dog and friends – animal noises (6)
- Angela Feswick – radio (7)
