= Superman's Song =

1991 single by Crash Test Dummies

- Canadian promo single

Single by Crash Test Dummies

from the album The Ghosts That Haunt Me
- Released: March 1991
- Genre: Folk
- Length: 4:31
- Label: BMG/Arista
- Songwriter: Brad Roberts
- Producer: Steve Berlin

Crash Test Dummies singles chronology
"Superman's Song" (1991)	"The Ghosts That Haunt Me" (1991)

Alternative cover
- American promo single

"Superman's Song" is the first single of Canadian folk-rock group Crash Test Dummies, appearing on their 1991 debut album The Ghosts That Haunt Me. The single was the group's first hit, reaching number four in Canada, number 56 in the United States and number 87 in Australia. It was featured in the pilot of the Canadian TV series Due South.

The song was covered by Lucy Wainwright Roche, daughter of Loudon Wainwright III and Suzzy Roche of The Roches, on her second EP 8 More. It also has been covered by Nataly Dawn and Wild Asparagus.

== Meaning ==
Brad Roberts has stated that "Superman's Song" is an "analysis of political philosophy" and that the way the song was written alleviated some of the seriousness of the topic. He explained the meaning of the song in a 1992 interview:

"Superman as cast in "Superman's Song" is obviously a left-wing political figure. His activity in the community is intrinsic to his being. Superman is being juxtaposed against Tarzan, who is kind of a laissez-faire capitalist type who retreats to the forest, and rejects the idea of community. He wants to live in a so-called animal state, and he doesn't have to be bothered with any kind of political realities."

Roberts has also stated that the song celebrates the ideals embodied by the superheroes:

"One of the things that impressed me was this distinction between the idea of doing something for a reason versus doing something for one’s own sake,” he says. “In the case of Superman, he pursues good for its own sake. It’s not so he can get something else. The end in itself. One of the things that the song gets at is this kind of decaying sense of civic responsibility, where characters like Superman are no longer valued."

== Music video ==
Brad Roberts singing in the music video for "Superman's Song".

The music video for the song was directed by Dale Heslip and features the band singing at a funeral for Superman attended by various aging superheroes. Some depicted are a middle-aged Wonder Woman-like character, The Green Hornet, and possibly Green Lantern (Alan Scott). It won the MuchMusic Video Award for Best Video in 1991.

== Charts ==
=== Weekly charts ===
Weekly chart performance for "Superman's Song"
Chart (1991–1992)	Peak position
Australia (ARIA)	87
Canada Top Singles (RPM)	4
Canada Adult Contemporary (RPM)	3
US Billboard Hot 100	56

=== Year-end charts ===
Year-end chart performance for "Superman's Song"
Chart (1991)	Position
Canada Top Singles (RPM)	27
Canada Adult Contemporary (RPM)	19
