= The Ballad of Peter Pumpkinhead =

1992 single by XTC

Single by XTC

from the album Nonsuch
- B-side: "War Dance"
- Released: 1 June 1992
- Studio: Chipping North (Oxfordshire, England)
- Genre: Alternative rock; folk rock; jangle
- Length: 5:02; 5:34 (early demo version)
- Label: Virgin
- Songwriter: Andy Partridge
- Producer: Gus Dudgeon

XTC singles chronology
"The Disappointed" (1992)	"The Ballad of Peter Pumpkinhead" (1992)	"Easter Theatre" (1999)

"The Ballad of Peter Pumpkinhead" is a song written by Andy Partridge of English rock band XTC for their 1992 album Nonsuch. It was their second number-one hit on the US Billboard Modern Rock Tracks chart, after "Mayor of Simpleton", and reached number 71 on the UK Singles Chart. The song tells the story of Peter Pumpkinhead, a man who comes to an unspecified town and provides aid for the poor and homeless. He gains widespread public approval, but the government comes to resent his success and tries in vain to malign his reputation. Peter is ultimately nailed to a block of wood by his enemies, and his death is broadcast on live television.

The song was inspired by a jack o'lantern Partridge had carved and placed on a fence post in his garden for Halloween. Afterward, as he walked past it each day on his way to and from a home studio in which he composed songs, he observed its advancing state of decay and began to feel sorry for it. He said that he began thinking about "what would happen if there was somebody on Earth who was kind of perfect ... God, they'd make so many enemies!"

== Music video ==
There are two different versions of the XTC music video, both of which feature a scenario very similar to the assassination of President John F. Kennedy, although one is heavily edited for US television broadcast and removes much of the more controversial material. The Kennedy reference is also made explicit by the image of a pig with a map of Cuba superimposed on it—a clear reference to the 1961 Bay of Pigs Invasion. They also briefly feature an actress dressed like Marilyn Monroe during the third verse.

In addition, the uncensored video makes brief reference to Jesus Christ by flashing the words "three nails" and showing a crown of thorns. The lyrics "Peter Pumpkinhead was too good; Had him nailed to a chunk of wood" reinforce this crucifixion reference.

== Charts ==
=== Weekly charts ===
Weekly chart performance for "The Ballad of Peter Pumpkinhead"
Chart (1992)	Peak position
Australia (ARIA)	131
Canada Top Singles (RPM)	48
UK Singles (Official Charts)	71
US Album Rock Tracks (Billboard)	46
US Modern Rock Tracks (Billboard)	1

=== Year-end charts ===
Year-end chart performance for "The Ballad of Peter Pumpkinhead"
Chart (1992)	Position
US Modern Rock Tracks (Billboard)	17

== Release history ==
Release dates and formats for "The Ballad of Peter Pumpkinhead"
Region	Date	Format(s)	Label(s)	Ref.
United Kingdom	1 June 1992	7-inch vinyl; CD; cassette	Virgin	
Australia	31 August 1992	CD; cassette	Virgin	

== Crash Test Dummies version ==
"The Ballad of Peter Pumpkinhead"

Single by Crash Test Dummies featuring Ellen Reid

from the album Dumb and Dumber: Original Motion Picture Soundtrack
- Released: January 1995
- Length: 3:46
- Label: RCA
- Songwriter: Andy Partridge
- Producers: Crash Test Dummies; Tom Lord-Alge

Crash Test Dummies singles chronology
"God Shuffled His Feet" (1994)	"The Ballad of Peter Pumpkinhead" (1995)	"He Liked to Feel It" (1996)

The song was covered by Canadian band Crash Test Dummies in 1994 for the soundtrack to the film Dumb and Dumber. It was the first Crash Test Dummies single to feature Ellen Reid on lead vocals. The cover was originally recorded to give Reid another song for live performances; the creators of Dumb and Dumber then approached the band about including it on the film's soundtrack. Reid said of the song, "It's about a person when they try to do good in the world, but people turn against them. Someone who is trying to do good, but is persecuted."

=== Music video ===
The music video was filmed in Nathan Phillips Square, home to City Hall in Toronto, Ontario; fans of the band were invited to an open casting by VJs on MuchMusic. It features Jeff Daniels reprising his role of "Harry Dunne" from Dumb and Dumber. In the video, Harry falls and gets a Jack-o'-lantern stuck on his head. In his struggle to get it off, he foils a bank robbery and becomes a media sensation. However, he is unfairly found guilty of the bank robbery and narrowly avoids being hanged (he is saved by the pumpkin, which is placed on his head before he's put in the noose).

The clip ends with a spoof of the religious imagery in the original video, as Harry's followers (oblivious to him having survived) venerate him as a martyr and establish the "Church of the Latter-Day Pumpkinheads" where they don Jack-o'-lantern masks, ape Harry's struggle to remove the pumpkin stuck to his head, and take communion of pumpkin seeds and wine sipped from a pumpkin stem.

=== Charts ===
==== Weekly charts ====
Weekly chart performance for "The Ballad of Peter Pumpkinhead"
Chart (1995)	Peak position
Australia (ARIA)	130
Canada Top Singles (RPM)	4
Canada Adult Contemporary (RPM)	5
Germany (GfK)	73
Iceland (Íslenski Listinn Topp 40)	2
UK Singles (Official Charts)	30

==== Year-end charts ====
Year-end chart performance for "The Ballad of Peter Pumpkinhead"
Chart (1995)	Position
Canada Top Singles (RPM)	24
Canada Adult Contemporary (RPM)	53

=== Release history ===
Release dates and formats for "The Ballad of Peter Pumpkinhead"
Region	Date	Format(s)	Label(s)	Ref.
Canada	January 1995	Radio	RCA	
United Kingdom	3 April 1995	CD; cassette	RCA	
Australia	24 April 1995	CD; cassette	RCA	

== See also ==
- Number one modern rock hits of 1992
