= A Worm's Life =

Studio album by Crash Test Dummies
- Released: October 1, 1996
- Recorded: Compass Point Studios, The Bahamas
- Genre: Alternative rock
- Length: 41:44
- Label: BMG; Arista
- Producer: Brad Roberts; Dan Roberts; Mitch Dorge

Crash Test Dummies chronology
| God Shuffled His Feet (1993) | A Worm's Life (1996) | Give Yourself a Hand (1999) |

Singles from A Worm's Life
- 1. "He Liked to Feel It" Released: September 1996; 2. "My Own Sunrise" Released: January 1997; 3. "My Enemies" Released: June 1997

A Worm's Life is the third album by Canadian band Crash Test Dummies, released in 1996. It was the follow-up to the band's triple-platinum God Shuffled His Feet. By February 1999, A Worm's Life had sold more than 1 million copies worldwide.

== Background ==
After the band finished touring their hit album God Shuffled His Feet, frontman Brad Roberts spent considerable time traveling abroad, relocating to London, England at the time to escape the pressures of fame and celebrity where, because they didn't get MTV Europe, no one recognized him there "except German and Italian tourists."

During his travels, Roberts began penning new material. Though he briefly visited New York City, most of the material he had written was outside North America, including one notable stay in Prague, Czech Republic. Finally, after having compiled much written material, Roberts reconvened with the rest of the band at Compass Point Studios in The Bahamas in the winter of 1995 to begin recording the follow-up to God Shuffled His Feet.

As a departure from the recording sessions of their first two records, the band decided to self-produce A Worm's Life. Pursuing a more guitar-heavy sound, the band drafted acclaimed music producer and recording engineer Terry Manning to engineer the record. The band's producer, Jeff Rogers, noted: "Terry has got a guitar collection to rival Randy Bachman's. And Brad got to play every one of them on the record."

Roberts had claimed on record that A Worm's Life "does go a little further than the other ones in terms of odd melodies, wacky key signatures, and chord changes." while continuing to adopt a lyrical approach that looks "at simple things in unusual ways rather than the other way around."

== Release ==
The album was originally planned for release on August 28, 1996. However, the release date would later be moved back to October 1, 1996, with BMG Canada citing the need for "more set-up time".

Originally "Overachievers" was planned as the album's lead single (then titled "The Over-Achievers"), with the band's producer Jeff Rogers even noting at the time that the band had contacted three different directors for music video concepts to complement that track's release. However, "He Liked to Feel It" would later replace "Overachievers" as the lead single as the album's release date drew closer.

"He Liked to Feel It" proved to be a hit in the band's native Canada, becoming their highest-peaking career single at #2 on the Canadian singles chart. Despite the single's success domestically, "He Liked to Feel It" made minimal chart impact abroad, perhaps due to controversy surrounding the track's music video hindering its promotional efforts. A second single, "My Own Sunrise", would follow in January 1997, becoming a minor hit for the band, with "My Enemies" following as the album's third and final single later that year, also making limited impact.

A Worm's Life enjoyed strong initial sales in Canada; achieving a platinum certification less than one month after its release date. However, the album sold disappointingly elsewhere, and would have a considerably shorter chart life compared to its predecessor God Shuffled His Feet in Canada.

== Track listing ==
All tracks are written by Brad Roberts.

| No. | Title | Length |
|---|---|---|
| 1. | "Overachievers" | 3:44 |
| 2. | "He Liked to Feel It" | 3:55 |
| 3. | "A Worm's Life" | 2:56 |
| 4. | "Our Driver Gestures" | 3:36 |
| 5. | "My Enemies" | 3:14 |
| 6. | "There Are Many Dangers" | 3:44 |
| 7. | "I'm Outlived by That Thing?" | 3:15 |
| 8. | "All of This Ugly" | 3:19 |
| 9. | "An Old Scab" | 3:50 |
| 10. | "My Own Sunrise" | 3:35 |
| 11. | "I'm a Dog" | 3:47 |
| 12. | "Swatting Flies" | 2:51 |

== Personnel ==
Crash Test Dummies

- Brad Roberts – lead vocals, guitars
- Ellen Reid – backing vocals, piano, keyboards
- Benjamin Darvill – harmonica, melodica, theremin
- Dan Roberts – bass guitars, synth bass
- Mitch Dorge – drums, percussion, digital stuff

with:

- Murray Pulver – electric guitar solos on "I'm a Dog" and "All of This Ugly", additional guitars
- Simon Franglen – string and horn arrangements on "My Own Sunrise"
- Terry Manning – recording engineer

== Reception ==
Professional ratings
Review scores
| Source | Rating |
|---|---|
| Allmusic | 2/5 stars |
| Entertainment Weekly | C− |

The album generally received mixed to poor reviews. Allmusic writer Darryl Cater gave the album 2 out of 5 stars and states that the album "finds singer-songwriter Brad Roberts rummaging through his repertoire in a futile search for a new idea. His glossy pop hooks seem to run over and over again into tunes he's already written. When Roberts isn't doing that routine, he's trying in vain to fit wordy lyrics into memorable melodies. The uninspired guitar-driven production (which has now left the band's folk roots behind altogether) doesn't help matters."
