= Mitch Dorge =

Canadian musician (born 1960)

- Born: Mitchell Dorge; September 15, 1960 (age 66); Winnipeg, Manitoba, Canada
- Occupations: Musician; record producer
- Instruments: Drums; keyboards
- Website: www.mitchdorge.com

Michel "Mitch" Dorge (born September 15, 1960) is a Canadian drummer, multi-instrumentalist, composer and record producer. He has been the drummer with Crash Test Dummies since 1991, and has produced albums with the band, in addition to his solo work.

== Biography ==
Dorge started taking drum lessons at age six. His first band consisted of an accordion player and him on drums. His friend moved to bass guitar and they jammed to Black Sabbath. He has been with the Crash Test Dummies since 1991, and has been credited as co-producer for both God Shuffled His Feet and A Worm's Life, the former of which reached sales of almost eight million worldwide.

Since 1999, Dorge has worked with Tuesday's Girl and Charlie Redstar as producer, engineer and drummer. Dorge was awarded the Prairie Music Award for Outstanding Instrumental Recording for his solo record, As Trees Walking. Downsampling Perception, a documentary based on Dorge's motivational and educational program "In Your Face and Interactive", has shown in film festivals worldwide, and has been nominated and awarded for best documentary. His soundtrack work for Cemetery Love Story and Mutual Cadence has reached audiences around the world.

He also travels to schools to bring a motivational awareness program to people on the topic of drugs and alcohol.

== Solo discography ==
=== Albums ===
- As Trees Walking (2002)
