= Crash Test Dummies =

Canadian rock band

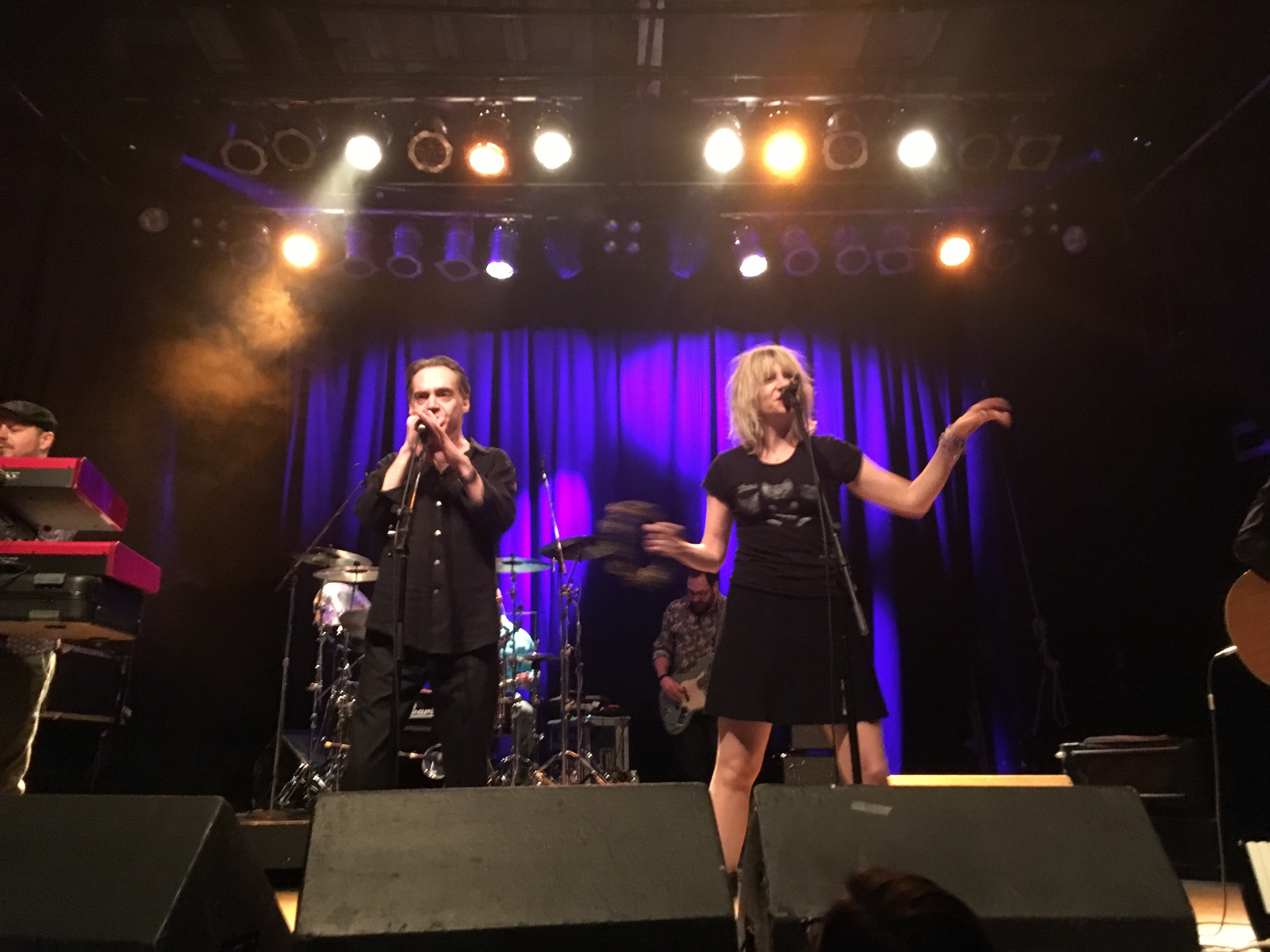
- Crash Test Dummies performing at the Phoenix Concert Theatre in Toronto in March 2019

Background information
- Origin: Winnipeg, Manitoba, Canada
- Genres: Alternative rock, folk rock
- Years active: 1988–present
- Labels: Arista, ViK., Deep Fried
- Members: Brad Roberts; Ellen Reid; Dan Roberts; Mitch Dorge
- Past members: Benjamin Darvill; Daniel Koulack; Vince Lambert; Curtis Riddell; George West; Mark Crozer; Marc Mysterio
- Website: crashtestdummies.com

Crash Test Dummies are a Canadian rock band from Winnipeg, Manitoba.

Anchored by Brad Roberts (vocals, guitar) and his distinctive bass-baritone voice, the other band members have fluctuated over the years. Its most prominent line-up consisted of Roberts, Ellen Reid (co-vocals, keyboards), Brad's brother Dan Roberts (bass guitar, backing vocals), Benjamin Darvill (harmonica, mandolin), and Mitch Dorge (drums, percussion).

The band is widely known internationally for their 1993 single "Mmm Mmm Mmm Mmm" and in Canada for multiple top ten songs including their debut 1991 single "Superman's Song".

== History ==
=== Beginnings: 1988–1991 ===
The origin of Crash Test Dummies is tied to the history of two Winnipeg nightspots, the Spectrum Cabaret and the Blue Note Cafe, owned by Curtis Riddell.

In 1986, Riddell joined with Brad Roberts to form the decidedly less-than-serious bar band Bad Brad Roberts and the St. James Rhythm Pigs. Over time, the band evolved into Crash Test Dummies, a name suggested by a friend of the band who was in medical school. The diagnostic mannequin, known colloquially as a crash test dummy, was known to the public already by this time. The band adopted the name as a joke, but nevertheless kept it. Ellen Reid and Benjamin Darvill became permanent additions. George West, the original bass player, quit and was replaced by Dan Roberts, Brad's brother. Riddell was replaced by Vince Lambert, who was replaced by Mitch Dorge just before the release of The Ghosts That Haunt Me.

The band was discovered when Brad Roberts recorded a demo of his original songs and sent the demo tape to a producer of a Canadian music festival. From there, the tape was passed on to A&R people in Canada, which led to a bidding war. After signing with BMG Records in 1991, the band signed with manager Jeff Rogers (Swell) who managed the band until the end of 1999 when he left to become head of artist development at Richard Branson's V2 Records.

=== Mainstream success: 1991–1999 ===
The band first began to achieve commercial success in Canada with the release of The Ghosts that Haunt Me in 1991. The album eventually reached sales of 400,000 in Canada, largely due to the popularity of the hit single "Superman's Song", which appeared on the RPM top singles chart that year, featured on the soundtrack of an episode of the TV series Due South and earned the band the 1992 Juno Award for Group of the Year.

The band did not receive much international recognition until the 1993 release of their second album, God Shuffled His Feet. Particularly instrumental in increasing the band's exposure in the American market was the appearance of a new type of radio format, adult album-oriented alternative rock (AAA). These stations put the first single, "Mmm Mmm Mmm Mmm", in high rotation and the song peaked at No. 4 on the US Hot 100. "Mmm Mmm Mmm Mmm" did even better in the United Kingdom, where it was a No. 2 hit, and Australia where it peaked at No. 1. Popular parodist "Weird Al" Yankovic parodied the song under the title "Headline News" in 1994.

In their native Canada, "Mmm Mmm Mmm Mmm" was a comparative disappointment on the charts, only peaking at No. 14. Two other songs from the album went top 10 in Canada: "Swimming In Your Ocean" and "Afternoons & Coffeespoons". This latter song was also a top 40 hit in Australia and the United Kingdom and hit the lower portion of the US Hot 100. The result was that by mid-1994 the album had passed the platinum sales mark (one million) in the United States and had also earned the band three Grammy nominations and three more Juno nominations. To date, God Shuffled His Feet has sold more than five and a half million copies worldwide.

In January 1995, the band released "The Ballad of Peter Pumpkinhead" (a cover of XTC's 1992 track) as a single and on the soundtrack of the Jim Carrey and Jeff Daniels comedy Dumb and Dumber. The single, credited to "The Crash Test Dummies and Ellen Reid", charted at No. 30 on the UK singles chart and was a No. 4 hit in Canada.

In 1996, the Dummies' third album, A Worm's Life, was released to mixed critical and moderate commercial success. The guitar-heavy singles were warmly received in some markets. Lead single "He Liked to Feel It" hit No. 2 in Canada, becoming the band's highest-charting single in their home country, but internationally nothing matched the runaway success of either "Superman's Song" or "Mmm Mmm Mmm Mmm". Regardless, the album went platinum in Canada in less than one month.

Give Yourself A Hand, the Dummies' fourth album, was released on March 23, 1999. The album was recorded in Nassau, Bahamas, at Compass Point Studios and produced by Greg Wells. It showcased a new sound for the Dummies, as it featured Ellen Reid singing lead vocals on three tracks, and Brad Roberts singing in a falsetto on several others. The whole sound of the album was much more electronic than the previous recordings. Once again, the lead single ("Keep A Lid On Things") was a top 10 hit in Canada.

During a hiatus between albums, Benjamin Darvill became the first Dummy to release solo material. Under the name Son Of Dave, Darvill first brought out the album B. Darvill's Wild West Show, followed with O1, both released on his own label, Husky Records.

=== Post-mainstream career: 2000–2006 ===
The less-than-stellar commercial success of both A Worm's Life and Give Yourself a Hand resulted in the band feeling much more restricted by their label BMG, especially after the label rejected 35 songs during the production of Give Yourself a Hand. As a result, the band and the label parted ways, and Brad Roberts formed his own independent label, "Cha-Ching Records" (later renamed to "Deep Fried Records").

Free from major-label restrictions, the Dummies surprised their fans in 2001 by putting their solo projects on hold for a fifth studio album and tour. After suffering a near-fatal car accident in late 2000, Brad Roberts found himself recuperating in the town of Argyle, Nova Scotia. It was there that he met some local "lobster fishermen" who happened to be quite musically inclined – Kent Greene, Dave Morton, and Danny MacKenzie. Together, they recorded the bulk of I Don't Care That You Don't Mind, which was to have been Roberts' first solo album. Later on, Ellen Reid was brought in to record backing vocals for a few tunes, and Dan Roberts agreed to tour with his brother. When both Reid and Mitch Dorge agreed to tour as well, the Crash Test Dummies name was put on the record. The album saw the Dummies returning to their acoustic roots. Brad Roberts compared the album to the Dummies' first, The Ghosts That Haunt Me, though he called it more atmospheric and polished.

Near the end of 2001, some new Dummies solo albums were released. First, Ellen Reid launched her debut solo effort, Cinderellen.

Soon after, Brad Roberts' long-awaited double-live CD and rockumentary, entitled Crash Test Dude, were made available through MapleMusic.

Dorge's surprise debut album, As Trees Walking, was released in early 2002. He played almost all of the instruments, took some of the photos for the liner notes, and won a Prairie Music Award for Best Instrumental Recording.

Brad and Dan Roberts and Ellen Reid returned as Crash Test Dummies at the end of 2002 with Jingle All the Way, a long-rumoured Christmas album.

In 2003, Puss 'n' Boots was released. Much like I Don't Care, the album began life as a Brad Roberts' solo project. Co-written by Stuart Cameron, 13 songs were selected from a pool of 30. Reid sang backing vocals and Dan Roberts played bass, though much of the music – funky grooves that would not have seemed out of place on Give Yourself A Hand – was performed by other musicians.

Songs of the Unforgiven, the eighth studio album under the Crash Test Dummies name, was recorded not long after Puss 'n' Boots.

=== Hiatus, Oooh La La 2006–2014 ===
After releasing three records through his own label, Roberts realized he was losing money. As such, he stopped recording and touring and instead worked as a songwriting teacher in New York City, while participating in yoga, chanting, and meditation (the latter influencing Roberts' side-project Satsang Circus).

Despite the hiatus, in 2006 Brad Roberts began to record the album that would become Oooh La La with producer and friend Stewart Lerman, using the optigan and omnichord.

In October 2007, Sony BMG released The Best of Crash Test Dummies, featuring 12 tracks selected from the band's entire catalog, including most of their singles and several album tracks. The compilation would later be re-released on March 10, 2008, as Best of Crash Test Dummies – Collections with two previously unreleased tracks: "Laid Back" and "You Said You'd Meet Me (In California)", the latter being an early version of a song that would later appear on Oooh La La.

In addition, a new online store was opened allowing users to purchase downloads from all of the band's post-BMG releases, including Cape Breton Lobster Bash series, a collection of songs written about Brad Roberts' experiences at Cape Breton and an annual tradition known as the "Lobster Bash".

Work continued in 2008 on songs for an album which was tentatively titled Toys. In July 2009, the title of the album was renamed from Toys to Oooh La La.

A fourth song in the Cape Breton Lobster Bash series was released on July 27, 2009.

Oooh La La was released on May 11, 2010. The album's release was accompanied by the band touring in an "acoustic trio" format consisting of Roberts and Ellen Reid, accompanied by either Stuart Cameron or Murray Pulver on guitar. On October 9, 2010, as part of the Canadian leg of the tour, Dan Roberts and Mitch Dorge joined Brad Roberts and Ellen Reid in the band's hometown of Winnipeg for the first performance by the original line-up in a decade. Benjamin Darvill was not present for the reunion, despite having played a solo show in town a few days earlier. During the tour, Brad Roberts began the habit of taking photographs at random and posting them on his blog and the band's Facebook page.

In 2011, the band continued to tour in support of Oooh La La. On April 19, 2011, the band released Demo-litions: Cast-off Recordings 1996–97 featuring previously unreleased demos of songs written during the recording of Give Yourself a Hand.

In June 2012, Brad Roberts wrote a blog post saying that there is an incomplete new album lying around, but that producer Stewart Lerman is currently too busy with other projects to work on it.

== "Promised Land" 2014–2017 ==
In 2014, Marc Mysterio helped form a new lineup with Roberts and Mark Crozer from Jesus and Mary Chain. This led to the release of the revamped lineup's debut single "Promised Land", featuring both Marc Mysterio and Brad Roberts on lead vocals, with Mark Crozer on bass and drums. Mysterio wrote, composed and produced the song as well as playing guitar and keyboard on the record. Proceeds went to benefit the International Red Cross to assist with the refugee crisis in Europe.

Brad Roberts described how the new group came to be to scores of media outlets, "Marc Mysterio and I shared a few common friends and when his deal with Godsmack fell through, I stepped up to record the new song. In studio, Marc asked me to add in humming to the track and then after, my wife commented, 'Marc is really on to something there'".

"Promised Land" went on to score a Top 10 on radio in United States.

=== Second hiatus, solo tour, side projects: 2015–2016 ===
Following the completion of touring for Oooh La La, the band went on an indefinite hiatus, as Ellen Reid decided to retire from performing and Brad Roberts began to develop back problems. However, the hiatus was ended when Brad Roberts decided to go on a solo tour in 2015.

In early 2016, Brad Roberts announced his first tour of Canada in five years. In an interview about the tour, Roberts provided an update about the other members of the band, who he still keeps in touch with: Dan Roberts now has a family in Winnipeg, Mitch Dorge devotes most of his time now to motivational speaking at schools, Ellen Reid is married and spends her time creating elaborate Facebook pages with all her own illustrations, and Benjamin Darvill has found success for himself as Son of Dave. Roberts confirmed that he is the last remaining active member of Crash Test Dummies, with it just being him and guitarist Stuart Cameron going on tour.

On May 28, 2016, to commemorate his first Canadian tour in five years, Brad Roberts released the new song "I'll Be Peaceful Then".

=== Full band reunion and nostalgia tours: 2017–present ===
In mid-2017, the full band, except for Benjamin Darvill, reunited for a show in Winnipeg and Brad Roberts went on a tour of South Africa in early 2018. The band continued to perform together that summer, including a stop at Ontario's Burl's Creek Event Grounds in July.

In late 2018, it was announced that Brad Roberts, Ellen Reid, Dan Roberts, and Mitch Dorge would be going on their first full tour of Canada and the United States in nearly two decades to celebrate the 25th anniversary of God Shuffled His Feet. The band continued to tour through 2022 in celebration of the 30th anniversary of their first album, The Ghosts That Haunt Me.

In early 2023, the band released "Sacred Alphabet", their first song with the full band in over a decade. The song did not chart and received no substantive airplay on radio in Canada or elsewhere.

The years 2024 and 2025 saw the band touring internationally, playing the majority of God Shuffled His Feet live to celebrate its 30th anniversary.

In October 2026, the band released a statement announcing the cancellation of all their scheduled tour dates up to April 2027 due to Brad Roberts not being able to perform as a result of a herniated disc in his back.

As of 2026, the current lineup is Brad Roberts, Ellen Reid, Mitch Dorge, and Dan Roberts, joined by touring musicians Stuart Cameron (guitars and backing vocals) and Leith Fleming-Smith (keyboards and backing vocals).

== Musical style ==
=== Instrumentation ===
Throughout their career, Crash Test Dummies have experimented with many different styles and genres of music. These styles include the acoustic folk rock of The Ghosts That Haunt Me, the electric alternative rock of A Worm's Life, the urban influences of Give Yourself a Hand, and the optigan-based compositions of Oooh La La!

Crash Test Dummies recorded as a full five-piece band from their debut album The Ghosts That Haunt Me until Give Yourself a Hand. At this time, the most notable instrumentation of the band's music included Brad Roberts' lead guitar, Ellen Reid's keyboards, and Benjamin Darvill's harmonica. Another notable element of Crash Test Dummies' music are the contrasting harmonies between Brad Roberts' deep lead vocals and Ellen Reid's backing vocals in the higher register.

Beginning with I Don't Care That You Don't Mind in 2001, the band's albums were recorded primarily by Brad Roberts, Ellen Reid, and a rotating roster of session musicians.

=== Influences ===
One of the biggest influences for Brad Roberts was the band XTC and Andy Partridge in particular. The band even went on to cover two of XTC's songs: "The Ballad of Peter Pumpkinhead" for the soundtrack to the film Dumb and Dumber, and "All You Pretty Girls" for the XTC tribute album A Testimonial Dinner.

== Band members ==
Current members

- Brad Roberts – lead vocals, guitar (1988–present)
- Ellen Reid – keyboards, backing vocals, accordion (1988–2012, 2017–present)
- Dan Roberts – bass, backing vocals (1988–2004, 2010, 2017–present)
- Mitch Dorge – drums (1991–2002, 2010, 2017–present)

Current touring musicians

- Stuart Cameron – guitar, backing vocals (2001–present)
- Leith Fleming-Smith – keyboards (2023–present)

Former members

- Curtis Riddell – drums (1988)
- George West – bass (1988)
- Benjamin Darvill – harmonica, percussion, guitar, mandolin, backing vocals (1988–2000)
- Vince Lambert – drums (1988–1991)
- Daniel Koulack – bass (2004–2010)
- Marc Mysterio – guitar, keyboards, backing vocals (2014–2016)
- Mark Crozer – bass, drums (2014–2016)

Former touring musicians

- Kathy Brown – keyboards (1993–1995)
- Ray Coburn – keyboards (1999–2000)
- Murray Pulver – guitar, backing vocals (1996–2000, 2010–present)
- James Reid – guitar, backing vocals (2010)
- Andy Prestwich – kazoo, mouth harp (2019–2023)
- Marc Arnould – keyboards (2021–2023)

Timeline

== Discography ==
Studio albums

- The Ghosts That Haunt Me (1991)
- God Shuffled His Feet (1993)
- A Worm's Life (1996)
- Give Yourself a Hand (1999)
- I Don't Care That You Don't Mind (2001)
- Puss 'n' Boots (2003)
- Songs of the Unforgiven (2004)
- Oooh La La! (2010)

== Awards and nominations ==
Crash Test Dummies awards and nominations
Awards and nominations
Award	Wins	Nominations
Grammy	0	3
Juno	1	11

Totals (Note: Certain award groups do not simply award one winner. They acknowledge several different recipients, have runners-up, and have third place. Since this is a specific recognition and is different from losing an award, runner-up mentions are considered wins in this award tally. For simplification and to avoid errors, each award in this list has been presumed to have had a prior nomination.)
- Wins: 3
- Nominations: 16

Denmark GAFFA Awards

Delivered since 1991, the GAFFA Awards are a Danish award that rewards popular music by the magazine of the same name.

Year	Nominee / work	Award	Result	Ref.
1994	Crash Test Dummies	Foreign Newcomer	Won	
1994	God Shuffled His Feet	Foreign CD-Cover	Won	

Grammy Awards

The Grammy Awards are awarded annually by the National Academy of Recording Arts and Sciences of the United States. Crash Test Dummies received three nominations.

Year	Nominee / work	Award	Result
1995	Crash Test Dummies	Best New Artist	Nominated
1995	"Mmm Mmm Mmm Mmm"	Best Pop Performance by a Duo or Group with Vocals	Nominated
1995	God Shuffled His Feet	Best Alternative Music Album	Nominated

Juno Awards

The Juno Awards are a Canadian awards ceremony presented annually by the Canadian Academy of Recording Arts and Sciences. Crash Test Dummies won the 1992 Juno for Group of the Year and received an additional 10 nominations.

Year	Nominee / work	Award	Result
1992	Crash Test Dummies	Group of the Year	Won
1992	The Ghosts That Haunt Me	Best Album	Nominated
1992	Kevin Mutch, The Ghosts That Haunt Me	Best Album Design	Nominated
1992	Dale Heslip, "Superman's Song"	Best Video	Nominated
1994	Kevin Mutch, God Shuffled His Feet	Best Album Design	Nominated
1994	Dale Heslip, "Mmm Mmm Mmm Mmm"	Best Video	Nominated
1995	Crash Test Dummies	Entertainer of the Year	Nominated
1995	Crash Test Dummies	Group of the Year	Nominated
1995	"Mmm Mmm Mmm Mmm"	Single of the Year	Nominated
1996	Tim Hamilton, "The Ballad of Peter Pumpkinhead"	Best Video	Nominated
2000	Greg Wells, "Keep A Lid On Things" and "Get You in the Morning"	Best Producer	Nominated

MTV Europe Music Awards

Year	Nominee / work	Award	Result	Ref.
1994	Crash Test Dummies	Breakthrough Artist	Won	

== See also ==
- Canadian rock
- Music of Canada
