= Mmm Mmm Mmm Mmm =

1993 single by Crash Test Dummies

Single by Crash Test Dummies

from the album God Shuffled His Feet
- B-side: "Here I Stand Before Me"; "Superman's Song"; "How Does a Duck Know?"
- Released: October 1993
- Studio: Music Head Recording (Lake Geneva, Wisconsin)
- Genre: Alternative rock
- Length: 3:55
- Label: Arista; BMG
- Songwriter: Brad Roberts
- Producers: Jerry Harrison; Crash Test Dummies

Crash Test Dummies singles chronology
"The First Noel" (1992)	"Mmm Mmm Mmm Mmm" (1993)	"Swimming in Your Ocean" (1994)

Music video
- "Mmm Mmm Mmm Mmm" on YouTube

Audio sample
- file; help

"Mmm Mmm Mmm Mmm" is a song by Canadian rock band Crash Test Dummies, and written by its singer Brad Roberts. It was released in October 1993, by Arista and BMG, as the band's lead single from their second album, God Shuffled His Feet (1993). The accompanying music video was directed by Dale Heslip.

The song received positive critical reviews upon its release, though retrospective reviews have been more negative. "Mmm Mmm Mmm Mmm" reached number four on the US Billboard Hot 100 and topped the national charts of Australia, Belgium, Denmark, Germany, Iceland, Lithuania, Norway, and Sweden—yet in the band's native Canada, it stalled at number 14 on the RPM 100 Hit Tracks chart.

In 1994, "Weird Al" Yankovic released a parody of "Mmm Mmm Mmm Mmm" called "Headline News", with lyrics that humorously reference topical news items from the period. Brad Roberts enjoyed the parody version, and Crash Test Dummies performed the song with Yankovic on multiple occasions.

== Content ==
Each of the three verses describes the isolation and suffering of a different child, two of whom have a physical abnormality. In the first verse, a boy is injured in a car accident and misses school for an extended period; when he returns to class, he explains his hair spontaneously turned white due to the accident. In the second verse, a girl refuses to change clothes in the presence of other girls due to the birthmarks that cover her body. The third child is a boy whose parents require that he come directly home after school; during services at their church, they "shake and lurch" across the floor. During a 2010 live performance for the Dutch radio station Kink FM, Roberts whispered "Pentecostal" during the third verse, suggesting this is the denomination of the church.

Most of the lyrics are based on childhood experiences of Roberts. For example, he was in a few serious car crashes as a child, which inspired the first verse; he has a birthmark at the base of his spine which made him a bullying target as a child, inspiring the second verse; and he knew a girl who went to a Pentecostal church, where members were known to speak in tongues, inspiring the third. He got the idea of a boy's hair turning from black into bright white from stories he had heard about this phenomenon—canities subita—happening to survivors of perilous experiences, including a man who almost went over the Niagara Falls, and his great uncle who fought in Pacific Theatre of World War II and heard Japanese soldiers yelling threats in broken English.

An alternative version sometimes performed at live concerts replaced the third verse with one concerning a boy whose mother disposed of his tonsils after a tonsillectomy, thus depriving him of the possibility of bringing them to show and tell.

== Reception ==
=== Critical reception ===
Larry Flick from Billboard magazine named the song a "shimmering acoustic/rock jewel". He added that it "marries a worldwise vocal with a textured arrangement that is chock full of aural goodies. Given justice (and promotional tender loving care), this one will soon blossom into the across-the-board smash it should be." Dave Sholin from the Gavin Report stated, "If there's an Alternative outlet in town, you can hear how great this sounds on the air." Robert Hilburn from Los Angeles Times wrote, "The exaggerated vocal narration makes this sound like a novelty, but it is a deceptively original work about how kids are often tormented for falling outside the norm." In his weekly UK chart commentary, James Masterton joked, "The unusual song probably holds the record for the longest song title not to include a vowel in the title." Caitlin Moran from Melody Maker concluded, "It's delicate, like hope, and half-broken, like Nick Cave. It heaves and sighs with a choir to die for and a guitar line that snags on the heart."

Pan-European magazine Music & Media commented, "It takes one weirdo to dig another, so Dummy Brad Roberts and "Talking Head" Harrison make an ideal pair. This ballad is deceivingly ACE until you listen to the lyrics." Terry Staunton from NME declared the song as "a real oddity, a melodic saunter through the weird Americana of John Irving or Garrison Keillor". He added, "Canada's Crash Test Dummies present an ode to life's misfits, borrowing a musical trick or two from the quieter side of REM and the more melancholy Tom Waits. [...] This is very good indeed." Alex Kadis from Smash Hits praised it as "a truly beautiful masterpiece". Another Smash Hits editor, Mark Frith, gave it one out of five. Troy J. Augusto from Variety declared it as "an unlikely yet quite hummable pop tune." The track received a nomination for a Grammy Award for Best Pop Performance by a Duo or Group with Vocal, which it lost to "I Swear" by All-4-One.

=== Retrospective reception ===
Although highly successful when it was released, "Mmm Mmm Mmm Mmm" has since been frequently included on lists of bad songs. The song was number 15 on VH1's 50 Most Awesomely Bad Songs Ever, named by Rolling Stone as the "15th Most Annoying Song", and ranked at number 31 on Blender's list of the "50 Worst Songs Ever". The Huffington Post Canada ranked this song at number 29 on its list of "50 Worst Canadian Songs Ever". Contrasting, VH1 named "Mmm Mmm Mmm Mmm" as the 31st greatest one-hit wonder of the 1990s in 2011.

Although comparing Roberts' baritone to Chris Cornell and Eddie Vedder, Tom Ewing of Freaky Trigger believes the song's stately arrangement is more indebted to the "gentle folksiness" of R.E.M.'s Automatic for the People, deeming "'Mmm Mmm Mmm Mmm" to be "a far weirder record, an exercise in deflected expectations and a track which makes a virtue of running out of things to say." Ewing adds that the song can be alternately taken as "an annoying novelty" as "[some] people really hate this record, and the usual case against 'Mmm Mmm Mmm Mmm' is that Brad Roberts' singing is unendurable, a wracked procession of half-familiar vowels, crammed into words like wrong jigsaw pieces. [...] But in the course of a single hit, that’s a strength – the abstraction of the delivery makes the song work just as an exercise in texture and never mind anything else."

In a 1994 essay in which he makes the case that modern life is better than life in the past, humorist P.J. O'Rourke writes, "Even the bad things are better than they used to be. Bad music, for instance, has gotten much briefer. Wagner's Ring Cycle takes four days to perform while 'Mmm Mmm Mmm Mmm' by the Crash Test Dummies lasts little more than three minutes."

== Chart performance ==
Ewing characterises the song as a fluke brought forth from "the end of the alt-rock gold rush", one of a number of unlikely one-hit wonders (alongside those by Green Jelly, Ugly Kid Joe and 4 Non Blondes) "trawled up by the industry’s tuna nets as it tried to meet MTV and radio demand."

Outside their home country of Canada, the single became the band's most successful song, reaching number four in the United States and number two in the United Kingdom—the group's biggest hit in both countries. It also reached number one on the Modern Rock Chart in the United States and in Australia, Belgium, Denmark, Germany, Iceland, Lithuania, Norway, and Sweden. While the Crash Test Dummies had six singles reach the Canadian top 10, "Mmm Mmm Mmm Mmm" was not one of them, instead stalling at number 14.

== Music video ==
The accompanying music video for "Mmm Mmm Mmm Mmm" was directed by Canadian director Dale Heslip and premiered in October 1993. It sets the song's lyrics as the script for a series of one-act plays performed by schoolchildren. Throughout, the scenes of the performance are intercut with scenes of the Crash Test Dummies performing the song at stage side.

All three one-act plays included nicknames for their lead characters, to provide Heslip with easy references:

1. The first featured a kid nicknamed "Whitey"
2. The second pitted "Blotchy" against "Bratty Kids", who Heslip thought lived up to their nickname; Blotchy's marks are covered with a long cape she wears throughout, whereas the "Bratty Kids" wear deerstalker hats and carry magnifying glasses
3. The third had, as its focus, a "Reluctant Boy"

These nicknames were all revealed in an installment of Pop-Up Video. The same installment also revealed that Brad Roberts had decided to hum, rather than actually sing, the refrain of "Mmm Mmm Mmm Mmm" because humming the refrain sounded more resigned to him and that he never wrote lyrics for it.

== Track listings ==
- CD maxi
1. "Mmm Mmm Mmm Mmm" – 3:53
2. "Here I Stand Before Me" – 3:07
3. "Superman's Song" (live from the US public radio program Mountain Stage)
- 7-inch single
1. "Mmm Mmm Mmm Mmm" – 3:53
2. "Here I Stand Before Me" – 3:07
- US single
1. "Mmm Mmm Mmm Mmm" – 3:53
2. "Superman's Song" (album version) – 4:31
3. "How Does a Duck Know?" – 3:42
- Cassette single

Features cardboard picture liner

1. "Mmm Mmm Mmm Mmm"
2. "Here I Stand Before Me"

== Charts ==
=== Weekly charts ===
Weekly chart performance for "Mmm Mmm Mmm Mmm"
Chart (1993–1994)	Peak position
Australia (ARIA)	1
Austria (Ö3 Austria Top 40)	3
Belgium (Ultratop 50 Flanders)	1
Canada Top Singles (RPM)	14
Canada Adult Contemporary (RPM)	10
Denmark (IFPI)	1
Europe (Eurochart Hot 100)	3
Europe (European AC Radio)	9
Europe (European Hit Radio)	5
Finland (Suomen virallinen lista)	17
France (SNEP)	5
Germany (GfK)	1
Iceland (Íslenski Listinn Topp 40)	1
Ireland (IRMA)	3
Israel (Israeli Singles Chart)	4
Lithuania (M-1)	1
Netherlands (Dutch Top 40)	4
Netherlands (Single Top 100)	4
New Zealand (Recorded Music NZ)	4
Norway (VG-lista)	1
Scottish Singles Sales (Official Charts)	3
Sweden (Sverigetopplistan)	1
Switzerland (Schweizer Hitparade)	7
UK Singles (Official Charts)	2
UK Airplay (Music Week)	9
US Billboard Hot 100	4
US Alternative Airplay (Billboard)	1
US Mainstream Rock (Billboard)	25
US Pop Airplay (Billboard)	6
US Cash Box Top 100	3

=== Year-end charts ===
1993 year-end chart performance for "Mmm Mmm Mmm Mmm"
Chart (1993)	Position
Canada Adult Contemporary (RPM)	90

1994 year-end chart performance for "Mmm Mmm Mmm Mmm"
Chart (1994)	Position
Australia (ARIA)	14
Austria (Ö3 Austria Top 40)	11
Belgium (Ultratop)	10
Brazil (Crowley)	85
Canada Top Singles (RPM)	85
Canada Adult Contemporary (RPM)	76
Europe (Eurochart Hot 100)	14
Europe (European Hit Radio)	13
France (SNEP)	32
Germany (Media Control)	13
Iceland (Íslenski Listinn Topp 40)	4
Israel (Israeli Singles Chart)	18
Netherlands (Dutch Top 40)	29
Netherlands (Single Top 100)	52
New Zealand (RIANZ)	12
Sweden (Topplistan)	18
Switzerland (Schweizer Hitparade)	19
UK Singles (OCC)	48
UK Airplay (Music Week)	39
US Billboard Hot 100	35
US Modern Rock Tracks (Billboard)	17
US Cash Box Top 100	35

== Certifications ==
Certifications and sales for "Mmm Mmm Mmm Mmm"
Region	Certification	Certified units/sales
Australia (ARIA)	Platinum	70,000^{^}
Germany (BVMI)	Gold	250,000^{^}
New Zealand (RMNZ)	Platinum	30,000^{‡}
Norway (IFPI Norway)	Platinum	
United Kingdom (BPI)	Gold	400,000^{‡}
United States (RIAA)	Gold	700,000
^{^} Shipments figures based on certification alone.^{‡} Sales+streaming figures based on certification alone.

== Release history ==
Release dates and formats for "Mmm Mmm Mmm Mmm"
Region	Date	Format(s)	Label(s)	Ref.
Europe	October 1993	7-inch vinyl; CD	Arista; BMG	
Australia	March 28, 1994	CD; cassette	Arista; BMG	
United Kingdom	April 11, 1994	7-inch vinyl; CD; cassette	RCA; BMG	
