= Stuart Cameron (musician) =

Canadian musician

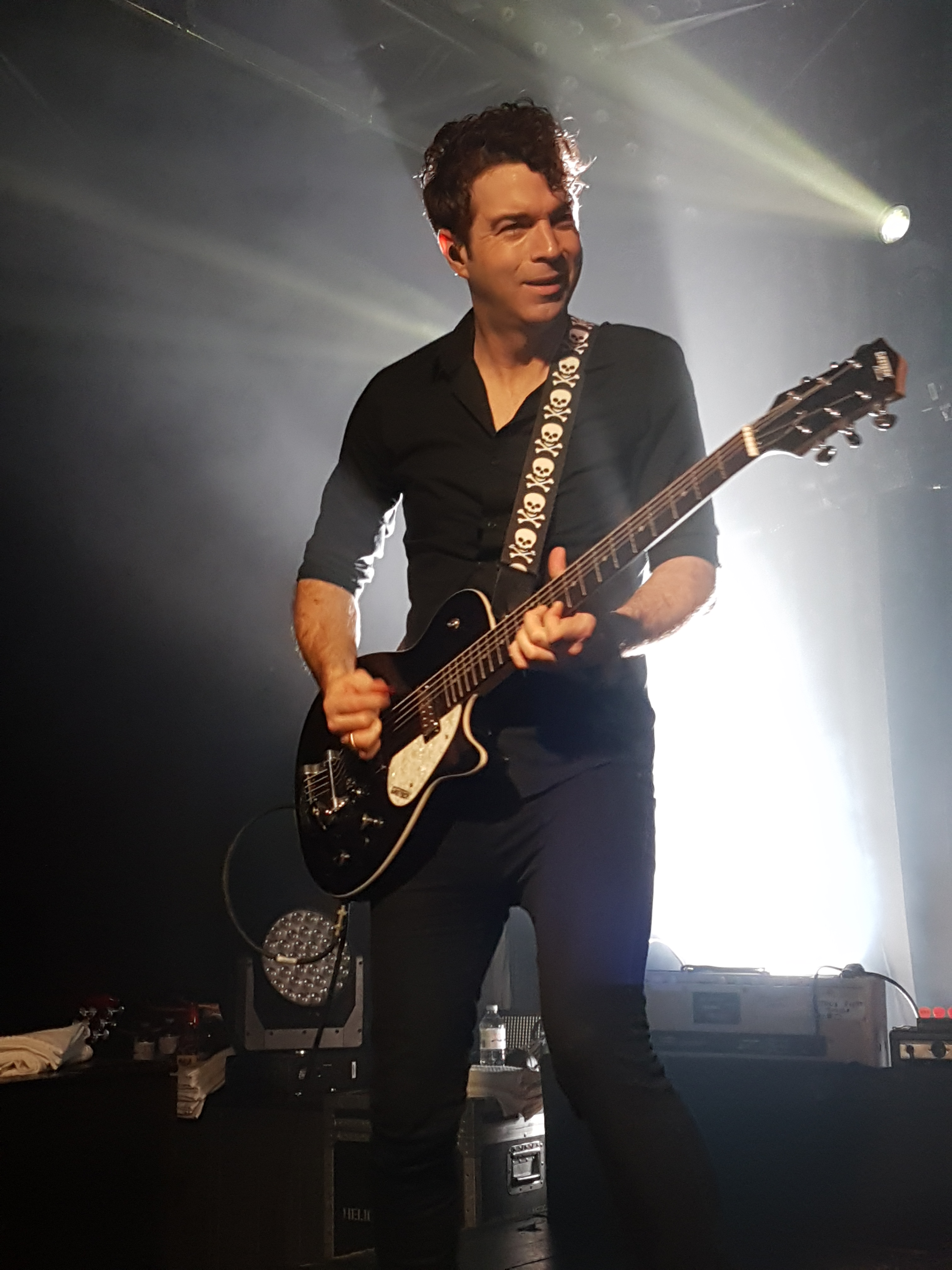
- Stuart Cameron performing with Matthew Good on March 7, 2017 at The Station Music Hall in Sarnia, Ontario, Canada.

Background information
- Origin: Toronto, Ontario, Canada
- Genres: Rock; alternative rock
- Occupation: Musician
- Instrument: Guitar
- Member of: The Heartbroken
- Website: http://theheartbroken.com/

Stuart Cameron is a Canadian guitarist, based in Toronto, Ontario. He is the son of John Allan Cameron and is a member of The Heartbroken. He has recorded and toured with Ashley MacIsaac, Crash Test Dummies, Amanda Marshall, Matthew Good, John Allan Cameron, George Canyon, Gordie Sampson and Shaye.

Cameron is a prominent figure in the Fergus Scottish Festival and Highland Games, in Fergus, Ontario, where he took over as Chieftain of the Games after his father's death. He leads many of the ceremonies and often plays a solo musical act or with Celtic bands who are a part of the festival, such as Tom Leadbeater, Seven Nations, and The Town Pants.
