= Brad Roberts =

Canadian singer and guitarist

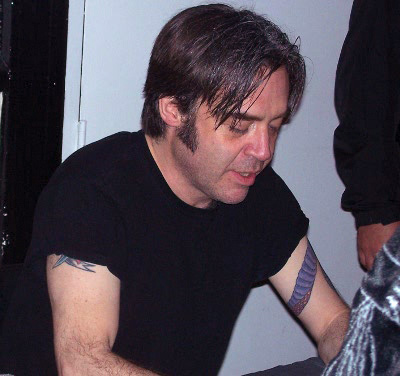
- Roberts in 2010

Background information
- Born: Bradley Kenneth Roberts; January 10, 1964 (age 62); Winnipeg, Manitoba, Canada
- Genres: Rock; Folk rock
- Occupations: Singer; songwriter; guitarist
- Instruments: Vocals; guitar
- Years active: 1989–present
- Labels: Arista; ViK. Recordings; Cha-Ching; Deep Fried
- Member of: Crash Test Dummies
- Website: crashtestdummies.com

Bradley Kenneth Roberts (born January 10, 1964) is a Canadian singer and songwriter from Winnipeg, Manitoba. He is the lead singer and guitarist for the Canadian folk-rock band Crash Test Dummies and the only constant member since its inception. He is known for his bass-baritone range. The band is best known internationally for their 1993 album God Shuffled His Feet and single "Mmm Mmm Mmm Mmm" and best known in Canada for the 1991 single "Superman's Song".

== Career ==
=== Early beginnings ===
Roberts was born in 1964 to Norman, a stationery salesman, and Eunice (née Crook; 1937–2025), a secretary, and grew up in Winnipeg.

At age 12 he bought his first record, Dressed to Kill by Kiss, and was inspired by guitarist Ace Frehley. He took guitar lessons for four years from that point.

Roberts studied English literature and philosophy at the University of Winnipeg, graduating with an honours bachelor's degree in 1986. He originally planned to become a university professor.

Roberts began performing with Paul James and Curtis Riddell at the Blue Note Cafe in Winnipeg. Without consulting Roberts, Riddell advertised them under the moniker Bad Brad Roberts and the St. James Rhythm Pigs. The band dropped this name at Roberts' insistence, and after Riddell left, they evolved into the Crash Test Dummies.

While attending university and working as a bartender at The Spectrum Cabaret, Roberts began writing his own songs and introducing them to the band. After attending a songwriters' workshop with Lyle Lovett at the Winnipeg Folk Festival, he wrote "Superman's Song".

=== Debut album ===
Crash Test Dummies released their debut album, The Ghosts That Haunt Me, in 1991.

=== Second album and international success ===
With more time and finances, Roberts set about writing the band's second album, God Shuffled His Feet. This to date is the band's best selling and most popular album, bringing an international audience and selling over six million copies.

=== Third album: A Worm's Life ===
A Worm's Life was released in 1996, selling over one million copies and showcasing a harder-edged sound as the band continued to evolve, producing this album on their own.

=== Fourth album: Give Yourself a Hand ===
1999 introduced a mix of electronic funk and spontaneous wordplay with Give Yourself a Hand. Roberts met Greg Wells at a songwriters' workshop and invited him to co-write and assist in recording this album inspired by influences and flavours of Roberts' new home in Harlem, New York.

=== Car accident and independent release ===
On September 28, 2000, Roberts was severely injured when he crashed his car on a dirt road in Yarmouth County, Nova Scotia; he was charged with drug possession when marijuana was discovered on his person by the RCMP. While recuperating, he began to jam with locals (The Great Wind Jammers from Argyle, Yarmouth County), subsequently producing his next album, I Don't Care That You Don't Mind, from the sessions — the first album released by the band, independent of a major record label.

=== Sixth album: Puss 'n' Boots ===
Puss 'n' Boots was released in October 2003 with a European and additional American version.

=== Further releases ===
A Crash Test Dummies album, Oooh La La!, was released in 2010. This was followed with the solo release on an album of mantras entitled Rajanaka: Mantra, in 2011.

== Musical influences ==
His influences as a musician are primarily rooted in late-1960s, 1970s, and 1980s British music, from the albums Let It Bleed by The Rolling Stones, Abbey Road by The Beatles, Diamond Dogs by David Bowie and Oranges & Lemons by XTC, which was introduced to him by his friend on his car stereo in the late 1980s.

== Awards and honours ==
=== Songwriting awards ===
- 1992: SOCAN Pop Music Award for "Superman's Song".
- 2016: SOCAN Classics Awards for "Mmm Mmm Mmm Mmm" and "Afternoons & Coffeespoons".

=== Awards with Crash Test Dummies ===
- 1992: Juno Award for Group of the Year.
- 1994: MTV Europe Music Award for Breakthrough Artist.

=== Grammy nominations with Crash Test Dummies ===
- 1995: Best New Artist.
- 1995: Best Pop Performance by a Duo or Group with Vocals for "Mmm Mmm Mmm Mmm".
- 1995: Best Alternative Music Album for God Shuffled His Feet.

== Discography ==
=== Crash Test Dummies ===
- The Ghosts That Haunt Me (1991)
- God Shuffled His Feet (1993)
- A Worm's Life (1996)
- Give Yourself a Hand (1999)
- I Don't Care That You Don't Mind (2001)
- Jingle All the Way (2002)
- Puss 'n' Boots (2003)
- Songs of the Unforgiven (2004)
- Oooh La La! (2010)

=== Solo ===
- Rajanaka: Mantra (2011)

=== Collaborations ===
- Heaven and hell Joe Jackson album (1997)
- Midnight Garden (with Rob Morsberger) (2012)

=== Live ===
- Crash Test Dude (2001)

=== Videos ===
- Crash Test Dude (2001)
