= Cowboy Mouth discography =

- Studio albums: 12
- Live albums: 3

Following is the discography of the New Orleans, Louisiana-based rock band Cowboy Mouth.

== Albums ==
=== Studio albums ===
List of studio albums, with selected details
Title	Studio album details
Word of Mouth	Released: 1992; Label: Trans Records; Monkey Hill Records
It Means Escape	Released: November 14, 1994; Label: Monkey Hill Records
Are You with Me?	Released: July 2, 1996; Label: MCA
Mercyland	Released: September 22, 1998; Label: MCA
Easy	Released: June 27, 2000; Label: Blackbird Entertainment/Atlantic
Uh-Oh	Released: July 29, 2003; Label: Eleven Thirty
Voodoo Shoppe	Released: February 21, 2006; Label: Eleven Thirty
Fearless	Released: September, 2008; Label: Valley Entertainment
This Train...	Released: 2012
Go!	Released: 2014
The Name Of The Band Is...	Released: 2016
The Name Of The Band Is, Volume 2	Released: 2018

=== Live albums ===
List of live albums, with selected details
Title	Live album details
Mouthin' Off Live	Release: 1993
All You Need Is Live	Released: March 7, 2000
Live at the Zoo	Released: June 6, 2004
Live at The 2023 New Orleans Jazz and Heritage Festival	Released: August 12, 2023

== Extended plays ==
List of extended plays, with selected details
Title	Extended play details
Mardi Gras	Released: December 3, 2010; Label: Valley Entertainment
Open Wide	Released: March 27, 2020
