= John Thomas Griffith =

American singer-songwriter (born 1960)

- Born: April 3, 1960 (age 66); Lubbock, Texas, U.S
- Occupations: Musician, singer, songwriter, producer
- Instruments: Guitar, keyboards, vocals
- Years active: 40
- Website: Official website

John Thomas Griffith (born April 3, 1960) is an American singer-songwriter best known as a guitarist and vocalist for the band Cowboy Mouth. Griffith first established himself on the American music scene in the early 1980s as lead singer and guitarist for the new wave band Red Rockers, co-writing their 1983 MTV hit "China".

Griffith was born in Lubbock, Texas, and raised in Houston, Southern California, New Jersey, and eventually New Orleans. In Louisiana, while attending LSU in Baton Rouge, he began his professional musical career. Finding a base in New Orleans, Griffith and local friends, James Singletary and Darren Hill, founded the early punk rock band, Red Rockers. After a short but successful career highlighted by the 1983–84 MTV hits, "China" and, "Good as Gold", singles from its album Good As Gold (Columbia/415,1983), multi arena tours with U2, Joan Jett, Men at Work and B-52s, Red Rockers disbanded in early 1986.

The departure led Griffith to release his first solo album, Son of an Engineer, in 1988 on Laughing Gravy Music. After a brief attempt at solo work, opening twice for Bob Dylan, Griffith was approached by fellow New Orleanians, Fred LeBlanc and Paul Sanchez, in the fall 1990. Griffith and Sanchez were already performing as The Lonesome Travelers, in 1989.

Since 1990, Griffith has been a founding member, resident guitar slinger, vocalist, and principal songwriter for the New Orleans–based rock group, Cowboy Mouth. In 2019, Cowboy Mouth made a 29th consecutive New Orleans Jazz and Heritage Fest performance, and Griffith a 31st.

Known by most of his fans as "JTG" or "Griff", John Thomas Griffith was inducted into Buddy magazine's Texas Guitar Hall of Fame in 1999, joining Billy Gibbons of ZZ Top, Eric Johnson, and others.

When not touring with Cowboy Mouth, he performs living room concerts throughout the US, composes and licenses music for film and TV through his company, iSourceMusic, along with his side project, Black Ant King.

Griffith resides in Northern California.

== Discography ==
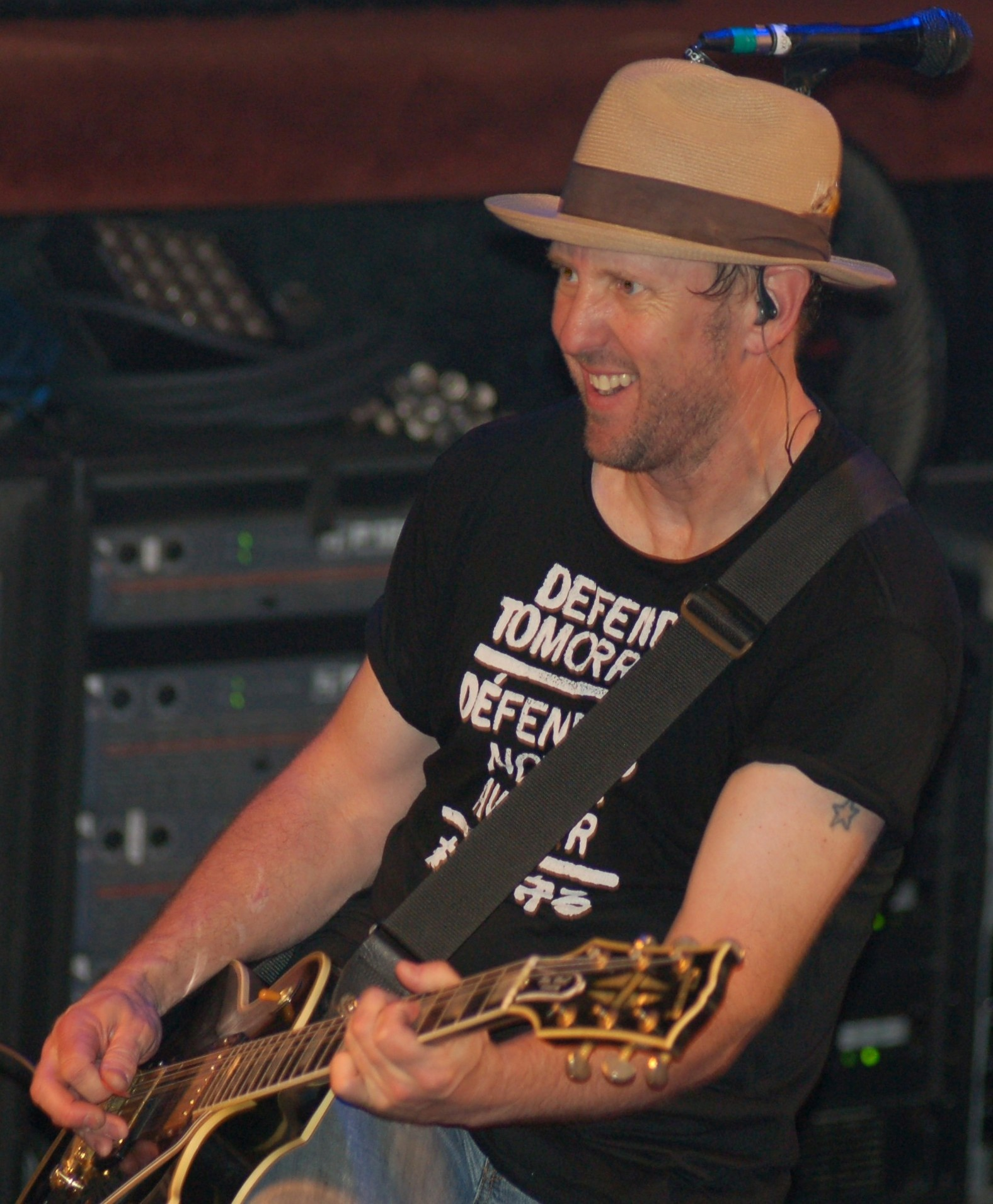
Griffith performing at the Culture Room in Fort Lauderdale, Florida in January 2009

=== With Red Rockers ===
==== Albums ====
- Condition Red (1981)
- Good as Gold (1983)
- Schizophrenic Circus (1984)

=== With Cowboy Mouth ===
==== Albums ====
- Word of Mouth (1992)
- It Means Escape (1994)
- Are You with Me? (1996)
- Word of Mouth (Remix!) (1996)
- Mercyland (1998)
- Easy (2000)
- Uh-Oh (2003)
- Voodoo Shoppe (2006)
- Fearless (2008)
- This Train (2011)
- Go (2014)

==== Live albums and EPs ====
- Mouthin' Off (Live & More) (1993)
- Mouthin' Off (Live & More) (remastered) (1997)
- Cowboy Mouth LIVE! (limited edition 5-song EP issued with Mercyland) (1998)
- Live in the X Lounge – "Jenny Says" (1998)
- All You Need Is Live (2000)
- Live in the X Lounge – "Easy" (2000, 2001)
- Uh Oh (5-song preview EP) (2003)
- Live at the Zoo (2004)
- Mardi Gras (2010)

==== Live DVD ====
- The Name of the Band is Cowboy Mouth (2007)

=== Solo albums ===
- Son of an Engineer (1987)
- Lonesome Travelers (2000)
- Aluminum (2001)
- Lonesome Travelers – Chicago Live (2003)
- Apples and Onions (2005)
