= The Cold (rock band) =

American new wave band

The Cold was a new wave band that formed in New Orleans in 1979. The band was hugely popular in its home city and throughout the southeastern U.S. during its existence, but did not find national success. The members of The Cold were Barbara Menendez (vocals and keyboards), Vance DeGeneres (bass), Chris Luckette (drums), Kevin Radecker (guitar) and Bert Smith (guitar). Influenced by British punk bands as well as American act Blondie, the band released several independent singles between 1980 and 1982, then split up. They reunited in 1984 for an LP and new single release, and released another album in 1985. In 1997, a compilation of their early singles entitled Three Chord City was released. The band reunited for some live performances in 1999 and 2001. In 2005 a CD of outtakes from the band's original incarnation was released. In 2018, the band was inducted into the Louisiana Music Hall of Fame.

The Cold was the successor of the band "Totally Cold", whose membership included Radecker and Smith and which was a frequent opening band for The Normals, a locally popular punk band for which Luckette was the drummer. The name "Totally Cold" was a spoof of the album Totally Hot by Olivia Newton-John; the idea was that the band would be dedicated to a style as far opposite as possible from this album.

Vance DeGeneres is the brother of comedian Ellen DeGeneres, was the original Mr. Hands in Walter Williams's Mr. Bill Show, was a regular on The Daily Show, and has played with Cowboy Mouth. Chris Luckette later joined Dash Rip Rock for several years. Barbara Menendez married Ray Ganucheau (who was in the Continental Drifters); in 2010 she started a band, The Help, which included one of their four children. Bert Smith later became the deputy chief operating officer of Jefferson Parish, Louisiana, and the band's manager, Bruce Spizer, is a lawyer who is known as an expert on The Beatles.
