= DeGeneres =

DeGeneres is a surname of French origin. Notable people with the surname include:

- Betty DeGeneres (born 1930), mother of Ellen DeGeneres and American activist.
- Ellen DeGeneres (born 1958), American stand-up comedian, television hostess, and actress.
- Vance DeGeneres (born 1954), American actor, older brother of Ellen DeGeneres.
- Portia de Rossi, or Portia DeGeneres (born 1973), wife of Ellen DeGeneres and American actress.
