= Dumb and Dumber (soundtrack) =

1994 film soundtrack album

Dumb and Dumber (Original Motion Picture Soundtrack)

Soundtrack album by various artists
- Released: November 22, 1994
- Genre: Soundtrack
- Length: 47:17
- Label: RCA

Singles from Dumb and Dumber (Original Motion Picture Soundtrack)
- 1. "New Age Girl" Released: June 6, 1994; 2. "The Ballad of Peter Pumpkinhead" Released: January 1995

Dumb and Dumber (Original Motion Picture Soundtrack) is the soundtrack album to the 1994 road buddy comedy film Dumb and Dumber directed by Peter Farrelly, which is the first instalment in the Dumb and Dumber franchise and starred Jim Carrey and Jeff Daniels. The soundtrack was released on November 22, 1994 via RCA Records and featured 13 songs, including the chart topping "New Age Girl" by Deadeye Dick which released as the single on June 6, 1994.

== Background ==
The score for Dumb and Dumber was composed by Todd Rundgren, whom director Peter Farrelly would later say "did an awesome job" but "didn't quite get the movie". Rundgren also contributed the song "Can We Still Be Friends?" to the film, although not included in the soundtrack.

Though not present on the soundtrack, the film famously features Carrey and Daniels singing an a cappella version of "Mockingbird" to Mike Starr's character. Also missing on the soundtrack is Apache Indian's "Boom Shack-A-Lak", which accompanies the film's opening sequence, as well as several other songs appearing in the film. Songs not included on the soundtrack are "Red Right Hand" by Nick Cave & the Bad Seeds, "The Rain, the Park & Other Things" by The Cowsills, "Mmm Mmm Mmm Mmm" by Crash Test Dummies, "Oh, Pretty Woman" by Roy Orbison, "Can We Still Be Friends?" by Todd Rundgren and "Rollin' Down the Hill" by The Rembrandts.

Beck had been approached about including his song "Loser" on the soundtrack, but he refused. He recalled the process: "I remember getting a phone call one day. My manager said, 'There's a film. They want to use 'Loser' as the theme song'. There was a long pause, and he said, 'The name of the film is Dumb And Dumber. And I just remember: That sums up what the world thinks of me at this point. I tried to have fun with it, tried to not take it too serious. But at the same time, it was a little disheartening sometimes."

== Release ==
The original soundtrack to the film was released by RCA Records on November 22, 1994. The soundtrack album was preceded by the lead single, "New Age Girl" by Deadeye Dick, which was a chart-topping success, reaching number 27 in the US. Apparently, it was their band's only hit song ensuring their one-hit wonder status. The Canadian rock band Crash Test Dummies performed a cover version of "The Ballad of Peter Pumpkinhead" originally performed by the rock band XTC. It was released as the album's second single in January 1995. The accompanying music video for the song featured Jeff Daniels reprising his role of Harry.

Out of the 13 songs, only three of them were made available via MOD-store digital providers, whereas the rest of the 10 songs were only available in CDs and cassettes.

== Reception ==
The soundtrack album has generally seen positive reception from critics. Joe Bishop of Vice named the album his favorite movie soundtrack, while the same site's Cameron Matthews described it as "a perfect slice of the mid-'90s sound: bubbly pop rock with jangly chords and just enough grit, or aka the thing you can give your kids when they one day ask you what the '90s were like".

Emma Cochrane of Smash Hits said "Soundtrack albums can be a waste of space, one good tune, a couple of dodgy instrumentals and tonnes of stuff you didn't really want to hear again. But if you're an "alternative" music or indie kid you won't find much to complain about here." Stephen Thomas Erlewine of AllMusic said that "Dumb and Dumber is a surprisingly entertaining hodgepodge of alternative rock, mainstream pop, and novelties that is considerably smarter than the movie it supports."

Country musician Luke Combs considered the film's soundtrack to be his favorite as he actually liked the film, and the soundtrack was assembled very well to fit into the narrative which helped him to revisit the film and its music often.

== Track listing ==
No.	Title	Artist	Length
1.	"The Ballad of Peter Pumpkinhead"	Crash Test Dummies featuring Ellen Reid	3:44
2.	"New Age Girl"	Deadeye Dick	3:28
3.	"Insomniac"	Echobelly	4:15
4.	"If You Don't Love Me (I'll Kill Myself)"	Pete Droge	3:32
5.	"Crash – The '95 Mix"	The Primitives	3:14
6.	"Whiney, Whiney (What Really Drives Me Crazy)"	Willi One Blood	3:36
7.	"Where I Find My Heaven"	Gigolo Aunts	3:25
8.	"Hurdy Gurdy Man"	Butthole Surfers	3:57
9.	"Too Much of a Good Thing"	The Sons featuring Bret Reilly	5:15
10.	"The Bear Song"	Green Jelly	2:41
11.	"Take"	The Lupins	3:01
12.	"You Sexy Thing"	Deee-Lite	4:06
13.	"Get Ready"	The Proclaimers	3:03
Total length:			47:17

== Chart performance ==
=== Weekly charts ===
Chart (1994–1995)	Peak position
Scottish Albums (OCC)	36
UK Compilation Albums (OCC)	74
US Billboard 200	42

=== Year-end charts ===
Chart (1995)	Position
US Billboard 200	188

== Certifications and sales ==
Region	Certification	Certified units/sales
United States (RIAA)	Gold	500,000^{^}
^{*} Sales figures based on certification alone.^{^} Shipments figures based on certification alone.
