= China (Red Rockers song) =

Single by Red Rockers

from the album Good as Gold
- Released: 1983
- Genre: New wave
- Length: 3:57
- Label: Columbia/415
- Songwriter: Darren Hill/John Thomas Griffith/James Singletary/David Kahne
- Producer: David Kahne

Red Rockers singles chronology
"China" (1983)	"Good as Gold" (1983)

"China" is a song by Red Rockers, released in 1983. It was a hit single, peaking at No. 53 on the Billboard Hot 100 and No. 19 on the Mainstream Rock chart.

== History ==
"China" was originally one of the ten songs on Red Rockers' second full-length album, Good as Gold. The single was released on the joint label Columbia/415. In the wake of 415's deal with Columbia, "Voice of America" was relegated to the B-side of the single, and "China" became the breakout single for the band. It spent ten weeks on the Billboard Hot 100, debuting at number 92 the week of June 4, 1983 and peaking at number 53 the weeks of July 9 and 16, 1983. Although the song did not reach the Billboard top 40, it has had an enduring lifespan. The song's popularity was enhanced by its colorful music video, which was a regular selection on MTV during its early years being added into rotation in April 1983. The video was filmed in New Orleans, the band's hometown.

== Legacy ==
"China" was described by rock critic Ira Robbins as "a startlingly pretty pop song", and it represented a major change in the sound and style of Red Rockers: "Gone was the raging rhetoric, replaced by ... articulate, ringing guitars and John Griffith's newly smoothed-up vocals."

"China" was included on Rhino Records' new wave compilation album series, Just Can't Get Enough: New Wave Hits of the 80's. In 2000, John Thomas Griffith re-recorded the song with his band Cowboy Mouth for their studio album Easy.

== Track listings ==
=== 7" track listing ===
1. "China"
2. "Voice of America"

=== 12" track listing ===
1. "China"
2. "China" (Dance Mix)
3. "Ball of Confusion (That's What the World Is Today)"
