= Red Rocker =

Red Rocker may refer to:

- Sammy Hagar, a singer nicknamed "Red Rocker"
- Red Rockers, a 1980s band
- Red Rocker, one of the two duelling robot boxers from the toy and game Rock 'Em Sock 'Em Robots
