= Red Rockers =

American punk rock/new wave band

- Origin: New Orleans, Louisiana, U.S.
- Genres: Punk rock, new wave
- Years active: 1979–1985; 2023–present
- Labels: Vinyl Solution; 415; Columbia
- Members: John Thomas Griffith; James Singletary; Darren Hill; Bryan Barberot; Jonathan Pretus
- Past members: Patrick Butler Jones; Jim Reilly; Shawn Paddock

Red Rockers are an American musical band from New Orleans, Louisiana, United States, active from 1979 to 1985, and reunited as of 2023. Originally formed as a hard-charging punk rock band, they changed their style to a smoother, more melodic sound and released two albums in the new wave vein of their record label, 415. They are best known for their 1983 hit single "China".

== History ==
=== Origins ===
The band was formed as a trio in 1979 by John Thomas Griffith (rhythm guitar and vocals), James Singletary (lead guitar), and Darren Hill (bass guitar). Under the short-lived pseudonyms of "Stunn", "James Jett", and "Derwood", with various stand-ins as "Drummur", they played punk rock as The Rat Finks. The group members were deeply influenced by the relatively new punk scene, and they were particularly moved by the radical political songs and styles of The Clash and The Dils. After a period of reassessment, they took on a permanent drummer, Patrick Butler Jones, and resumed use of their real names. They changed the name of the band itself, drawing on Darren Hill's favorite song by The Dils – "Red Rockers Rule". (In their live performances, The Dils in fact performed two different songs, "Red Rockers" and "Red Rockers Rule", but neither one was committed to vinyl until well after Red Rockers had released their own first record.)

=== Guns of Revolution: 1979–1980 ===
Red Rockers quickly joined the punk milieu in late 1979 with their first vinyl record, Guns of Revolution. The 45rpm EP, with the title track on the A-side and its B-sides of "Teenage Underground" and "Nothing to Lose", was a cult hit, and the band was heralded in some punk fanzines as "America's Clash"

Guns of Revolution was only the third release by a fledgling New Orleans record label called Vinyl Solution. Sales outstripped the small company's supply of its war-themed cover art, and subsequent pressings were distributed in plain white sleeves. (A third cover, with a photo of the band themselves, exists in extremely limited quantities). On the strength of the EP, Red Rockers became regular concert partners for virtually every punk band that toured through the New Orleans area. The group continued to hone a hard-driving punk sound over the next two years.

=== Condition Red: 1981–1982 ===
The band assembled its first full-length album, Condition Red, while on tour. Travel through California led them to a new record label, 415 Records of San Francisco, which released the 12-song LP in 1981. The record included a newly redone version of "Guns of Revolution" as well as the live track "Dead Heroes", which had appeared on a local New Orleans punk compilation and quickly became a signature song for the band. Condition Red also included a guest appearance by Dead Kennedys singer Jello Biafra who lent background vocals to the cover version of Johnny Cash's "Folsom Prison Blues". Performing in support of the album, Red Rockers were added as the opening act for The Clash as they toured Louisiana and Texas in early 1982.

Condition Red yielded scant commercial profit, but its positive critical reception bolstered the confidence of the band's new managers at 415. The San Francisco recordmakers were considered one of the most important independent record labels of the time, and their patronage became decisive for the band's future. They assisted the group members in relocating to their city, and set upon drastically altering their musical style.

=== Good as Gold: 1982–1983 ===
The band toured heavily with their label colleagues, quickly finding a harmony with their styles: Translator, Wire Train, and Romeo Void were all new wave bands, accomplished and popular, but with evident non-punk character. The band experienced strain and dissension in its new situation with the exacting producer David Kahne. Amid the difficulty, drummer Patrick Butler Jones left the band and by late 1983 he had been replaced by another ex-punk band member, Jim Reilly, who had drummed for the Northern Irish punk rock band Stiff Little Fingers. The "new" Red Rockers were filmed in two different videos in anticipation of the record's release.

When Good as Gold was released by a partnership of 415 and the major label Columbia, the distribution change was indicative of a change in the values of the band. What surprised critics more, however, was the change in music: from the rough, punk sound of the past, Red Rockers had become a polished, almost gentle-sounding band, fitting in easily with the softer new wave styles of the time. By the end of the year, Red Rockers surpassed all their labelmates in commercial success.

Kahne had put the band in the studio for unexpectedly long hours, and the work that received the biggest investment of time was the new song "China". Described by rock critic Ira Robbins as a "startlingly pretty pop song", it was a huge success – the single became a hit on the US music charts and the music video became a long-running staple on nascent MTV. A second single, the title track "Good as Gold", followed as Red Rockers crossed North America opening for major tours including The Cars, The Kinks, The Go-Go's, Joan Jett, The B-52's and Men at Work.

=== Schizophrenic Circus: 1984–1985 ===
The success of Good As Gold brought mixed fortune to Red Rockers. They felt the sting of their punk rock audience, who scornfully rejected the band's sudden conversion to commercial rock. Disunity over the band's direction was rampant and eventually led to the exit of guitarist James Singletary. The band's next album showed an even greater fragmentation in their musical approach: Schizophrenic Circus (1984) featured a new guitarist, Shawn Paddock, and new producers Rick Chertoff and William Wittman, but lacked a group cohesion. To its critics, the album drifts among musical forms and relies heavily on a high percentage of cover songs: the quasi-psychedelia of "Good Thing I Know Her" (which bears the album title in its lyrics) conveyed yet another new departure for the band's sound, "bewildering" to some. With some difficulty, Dave Marsh of Rolling Stone described Schizophrenic Circus as "postpunk folk-rock with garage-band propulsion and longhair tunefulness."

Perhaps the most glaring stylistic change of all was the unlikely design of the album cover. Redolent of The Doors' Strange Days, the circus-themed cover art was inevitably compared most unfavorably. John Thomas Griffith has said that the cover was disparaged by the bandmembers themselves, and he cites it as a main factor in the album's lukewarm commercial reception.

Three different singles were released from the album, but the only significant success was on college radio, where a cover of Barry McGuire's 1966 folk rock protest song "Eve of Destruction" was a minor hit. The second single was another cover song, "Blood from a Stone", which had been performed by The Hooters on their album Amoré (1983), and Trouser Press acclaimed the Red Rockers version as a big improvement over the original. In the wake of this new exposure, the Hooters remade the song again the following year, on their album Nervous Night (1985).

The 12-inch single featuring two versions of "Just Like You" was the band's last release. In early 1985, while still relatively well-known and touring with U2 on their Unforgettable Fire tour, Red Rockers disbanded and never reformed.

=== Post-breakup: Since 1985 ===
Lead singer John Thomas Griffith continues to play guitar and sing for the band Cowboy Mouth which he co-founded in 1990 with Paul Sanchez and Fred LeBlanc. James Singletary currently plays guitar for the New Orleans–based band Alexander Fly. Jim Reilly and Darren Hill joined the Boston-based Raindogs in 1985. Eventually Reilly moved back to the UK and currently plays with Scottish band The Dead Handsomes. Hill stayed in Boston, forming Klover in the mid-1990s; he now runs a management company, Ten Pin Management, which has represented Paul Westerberg, Roky Erickson, The Mighty Mighty Bosstones, The New York Dolls, and others.

=== Reunion ===
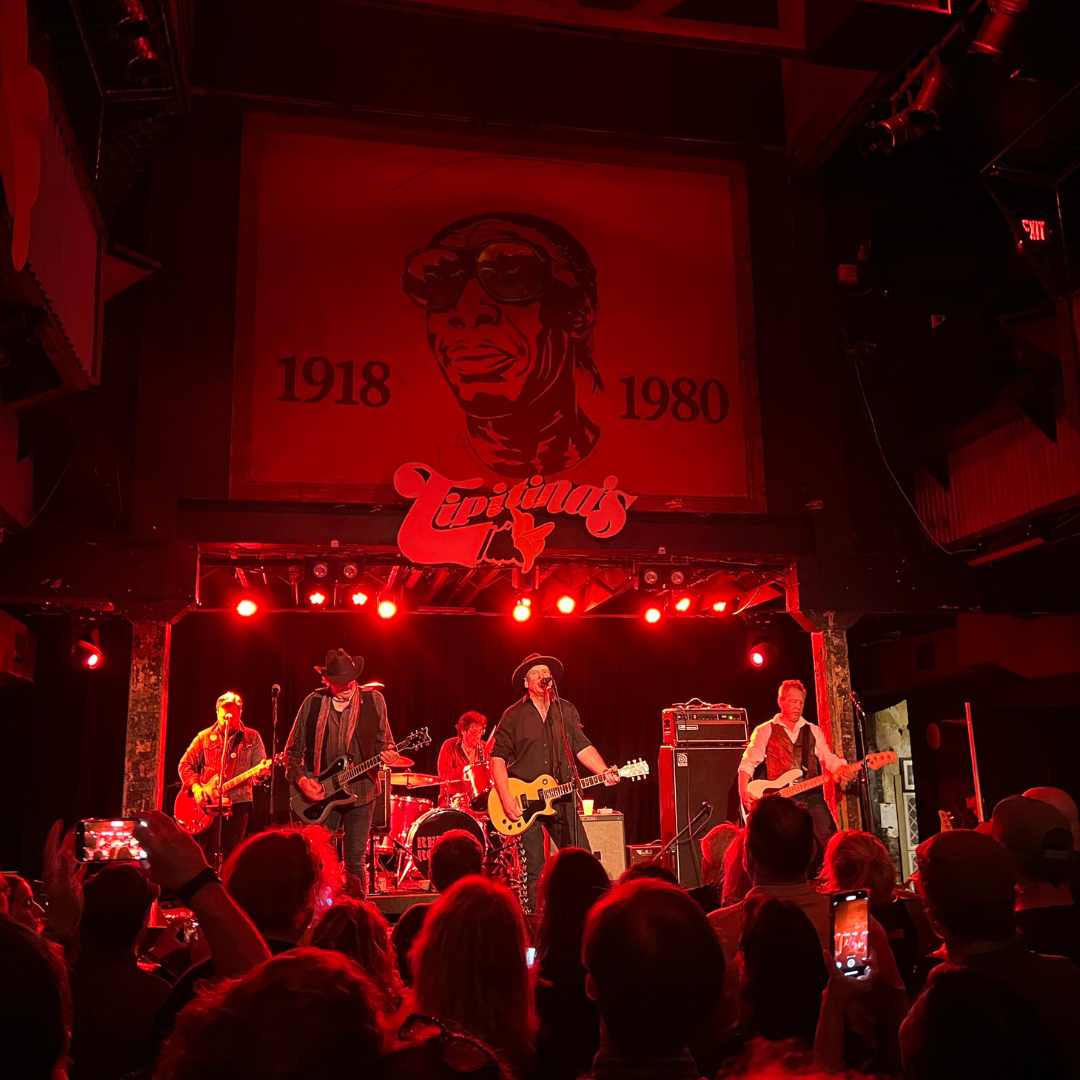
Red Rockers at Tipitina's in New Orleans, 2025

In 2023, the band re-released Condition Red, newly remixed and remastered, on the Sundazed/Liberty Spike label, and reunited for a live concert at Tipitina's in New Orleans on November 11th with drummer Bryan Barberot. The band performed the album in its entirety, as well as covers of The Clash's "I'm So Bored with The U.S.A." and The Normals' "Almost Ready," as well as The Pretenders' "The Wait" with vocalist Karen Kiki Aklam, The Beatles' "Helter Skelter" with The Breton Sound vocalist (and Griffith's former Cowboy Mouth bandmate) Jonathan Pretus, The Damned's "New Rose" with vocalist Brad Orgeron, The Runaways' "Cherry Bomb" with vocalist Stephie Whitesox.

They reunited again April 5th, 2025 again in at Tipitina's in New Orleans with Barberot returning on drums and Pretus joining on additional guitar and backing vocals, performing the Good As Gold album in its entirety, along with selections from Condition Red and covers by The Clash and Dead Boys, as well as "Ball of Confusion" by The Temptations, which was the b-side to the "China" dance mix single.

== Discography ==
=== Studio albums ===
Year	Album	Chart positions
Year	Album	US
1981	Condition Red	-
1983	Good as Gold	71
1984	Schizophrenic Circus	-

=== Singles and EPs ===
Year	Title	Chart positions		
Year	Title	US	US Rock	US Dance
1980	Guns of Revolution (EP)	-	-	-
1983	"China"	53	19	-
1983	"'Til It All Falls Down"	-	-	45
1984	"Eve of Destruction"	-	54	-
1984	"Blood from a Stone"	-	-	-
1985	"Just Like You"	-	-	-
