= John Boutté =

American singer (born 1958)

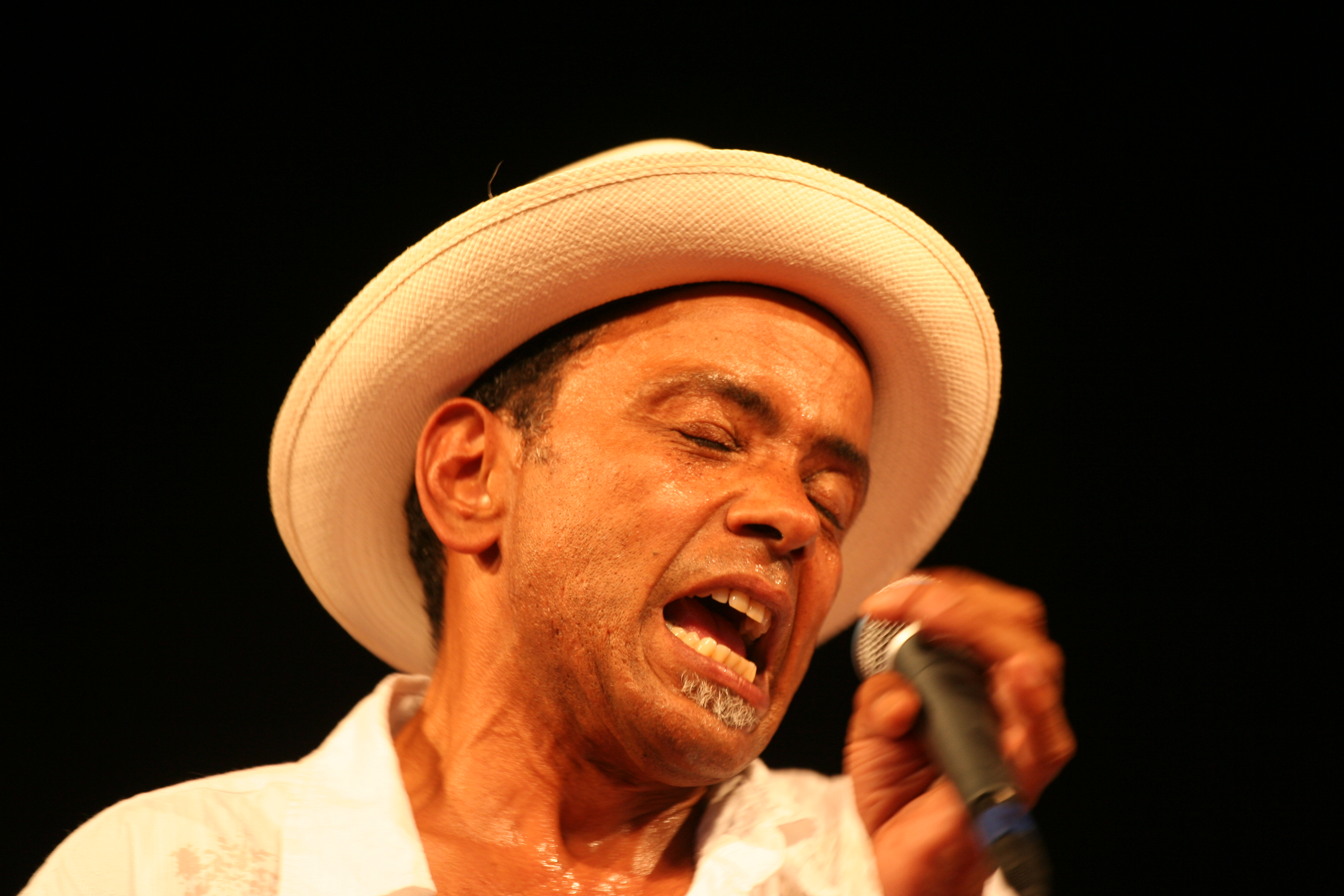
- Boutté in 2010

Background information
- Born: November 3, 1958 (age 67); New Orleans, Louisiana, U.S.
- Genres: Jazz, R&B, blues
- Occupation: Singer
- Years active: 1994 – present
- Website: JohnBoutte.com

John Boutté (born November 3, 1958) is an American jazz singer based in New Orleans, Louisiana, who has been active since the mid-1990s. He is known for a diverse music style that goes beyond jazz to R&B, gospel, Latin, and blues. He is the younger brother of the jazz and gospel singer Lillian Boutté, and a relative of cartoonist George Herriman.

== Life and career ==
Boutté was born into a 7th Ward Creole-Catholic family in New Orleans. Exposed to the local culture such as Mardi Gras parades and jazz funerals since childhood, Boutté also grew up listening to R&B music of Stevie Wonder, Marvin Gaye and the like. He played trumpet and cornet in marching bands in his junior high and high school days. During this time, he also formed an a cappella group and sang on the streets.

Boutté studied business at Xavier University of Louisiana where he was in ROTC. After he graduated, he was commissioned in the U.S. Army where he served for the next four years. When he returned, he started to work for a credit union instead of entering into the music industry. When he met Stevie Wonder, he started to seriously consider becoming a professional singer. Wonder acknowledged his talent and recommended him to pursue career in music. He soon joined Lillian on her tour to Europe, and his professional career started.

He was a featured vocalist on Lillian's live album, Gospel United, released in 1994. In 1996, he released his debut album titled Through the Eyes of a Child.

He was the featured guest vocalist on Cuban group Cubanismo!'s Mardi Gras Mambo, recorded in New Orleans.

Boutté has been working with ex-Cowboy Mouth guitarist and singer, Paul Sanchez which led to a collaborated effort Stew Called New Orleans, released in 2009. Boutté was also featured on John Scofield's 2009 album, Piety Street, singing the lead on three tracks.

Singers Tricia Boutté (Sister Teedy) and Tanya E. Boutté are John's nieces.

Boutté's "Treme Song" on his Jambalaya album is the theme song of HBO's series, Treme. Boutté appears in Treme's season 1 finale, serenading Kim Dickens' character before she leaves New Orleans. He also appears in season 2, episode 1, performing several songs (including "Accentuate the Positive"), and he sings onstage in Treme season 3, episode 10.

== Awards and honors ==
=== OffBeat's Best of The Beat Awards ===
Year	Category	Work nominated	Result	Ref.
2000	Best Latin Music Album	Mardi Gras Mambo (with Cubanismo featuring the Yockamo AllStars)	Won	
2002	Best Male Vocalist		Won	
2006	Best Male Vocalist		Won	
2007	Best Male Vocalist		Won	
2008	Best Traditional Jazz Album	Good Neighbor	Won	
2008	Best Male Vocalist		Won	
2009	Song of the Year	"Hey God" (with Paul Sanchez)	Won	
2009	Best Male Vocalist		Won	
2009	Best County/Folk/Roots Rock Album	Stew Called New Orleans (with Paul Sanchez)	Won	
2010	Song of the Year	"Treme Song"	Won	
2011	Best Male Vocalist		Won	
2012	Best Male Vocalist		Won	
2014	Best Male Vocalist		Won	
2015	Best Male Vocalist		Won	
2019	Best Male Vocalist		Won	
2020	Best Male Vocalist		Won	
2021-22	Best Male Vocalist		Won	
2023	Best Male Vocalist		Won	

== Discography ==
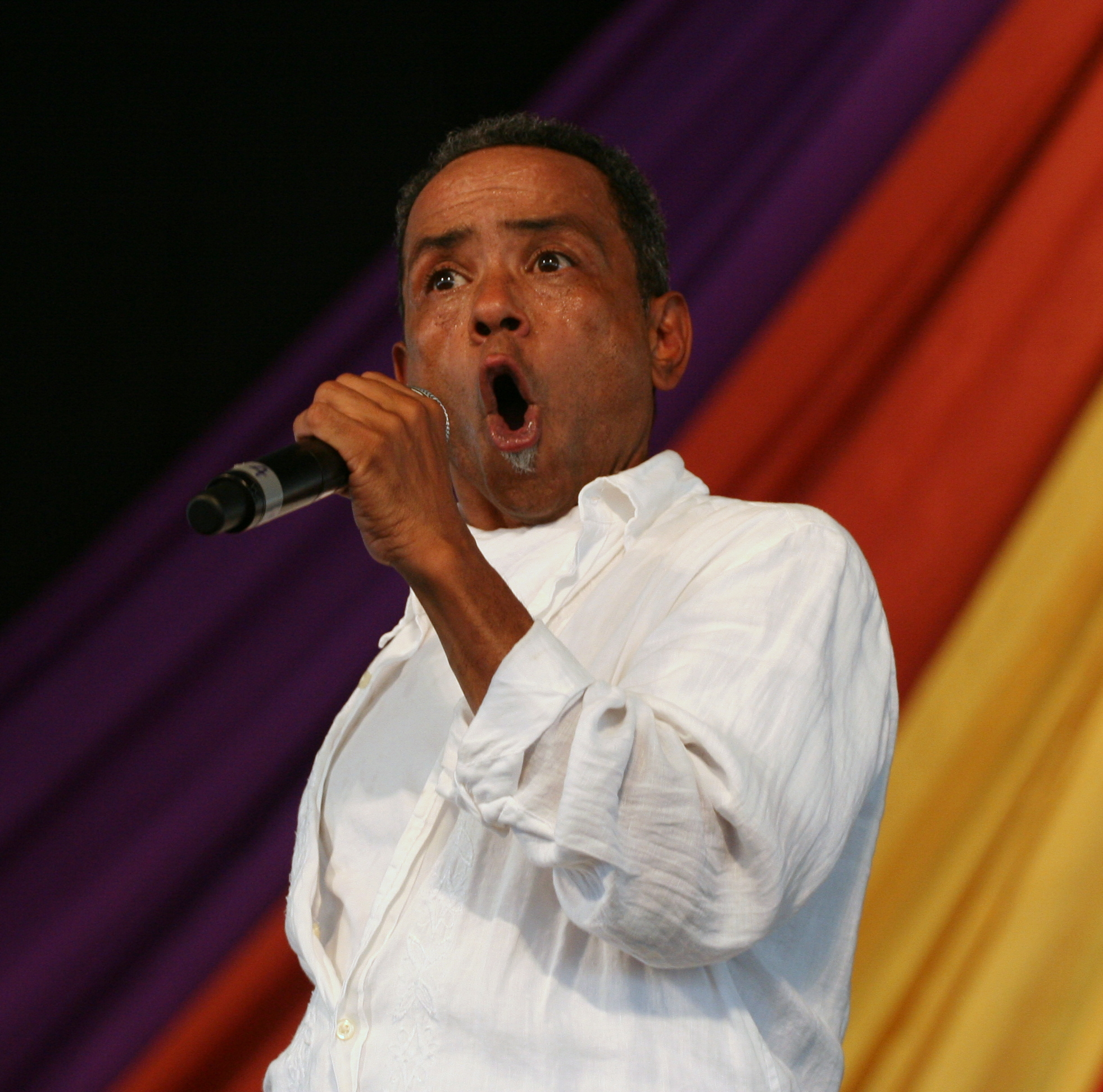
Boutté singing on May 6, 2012

=== Albums ===
- 1996: Through the Eyes of a Child (Dinosaur)
- 1997: Scotch and Soda ( Boutteworks johnboutte.com)
- 1998: Friends
- 2001: At the Foot of Canal Street (Boutteworks johnboutte.com)
- 2003: John Boutté & Uptown Okra / Carry Me Home (Boutteworks johnboutte.com))
- 2003: Jambalaya (Boutteworks johnboutte.com)
- 2007: John Boutté and Conspirare (Boutteworks johnboutte.com)
- 2008: Good Neighbor (Boutteworks johboutte.com)
- 2009: John Boutté and Paul Sanchez / Stew Called New Orleans (Threadhead)
- 2012: All About Everything (Boutteworks johnboutte.com)
- 2019: A "Well Tempered" Boutté (Boutteworks johnboutte.com)

=== Guest appearances ===
- 1994: Lillian Boutté with Gospel United / Live at Odense Koncerthus (Gospel United Production)
- 2000: Cubanismo / Mardi Gras Mambo (Rykodisc)
- 2002: Doc Houlind Ragtime Band meets John Boutte / Live At FEMO (Music Mecca)
- 2008: Paul Sanchez / Exit to Mystery Street (Threadhead)
- 2009: Glen David Andrews / Walking Through Heaven's Gate (Threadhead)
- 2009: John Scofield / Piety Street (Universal Classics)
- 2009: Tom McDermott / New Orleans Duets (Rabadash)
- 2009: Doug Cox & Salil Bhatt / Slide To Freedom 2 (NorthernBlues Music)
- 2010: Galactic / YA-KA-MAY
- 2016: John was the charity singer in the movie When the Bough Breaks
- 2017: Todd Rundgren / Beginning(Of the End) / (Cleopatra Records)
