= Alamo Village =

Movie set turned tourist attraction, in Brackettville, Texas

Coordinates: 29°25′28″N 100°23′40″W

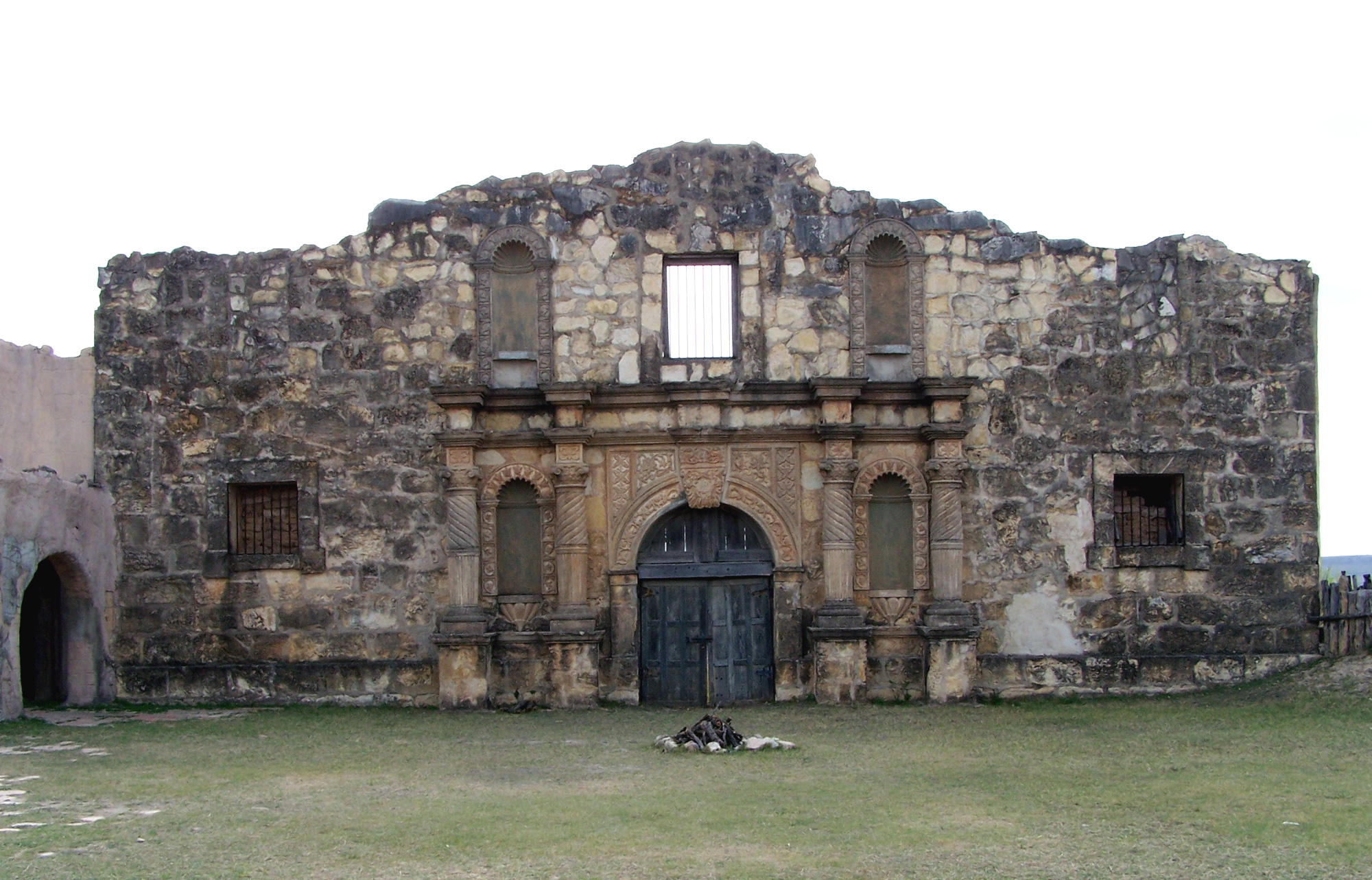
- The replica of the Alamo built for John Wayne’s film “The Alamo” (1960)
- Interactive map of Alamo Village
- Type: film set
- Location: Brackettville, Texas, US

History
- Built: 1957
- Built for: The Alamo
- Original use: film set

Site notes
- Area: 400 acres (160 ha)
- Current use: tourist attraction
- Owner: Happy Shahan
- Website: www.alamovillage.com (defunct)

Alamo Village is a film set and tourist attraction north of Brackettville, Texas, United States. It was originally constructed for and best known as the setting for “The Alamo” (1960), directed by John Wayne and starring Wayne, Richard Widmark, Laurence Harvey and Frankie Avalon.

== History ==
The set was built by James T. “Happy” Shahan of Brackettville, who in 1995 was named the “Father of the Texas movie industry” by Governor George W. Bush. Shahan began building the set on his ranch in September 1957 for Wayne, who had tried for years to make a movie about the Battle of the Alamo for Republic Pictures, before finally breaking away to form Batjac Productions. Filming for The Alamo began in August, 1959.

Originally, the set was to be facades of the front and sides of the buildings. However, Wayne ran out of money and called a halt to construction. Shahan agreed to continue working while Wayne raised more money, provided Wayne would agree to build full sets with four walls, a floor, and roofs. Wayne signed on to the deal.

The set includes a full-scale re-creation of the Alamo Mission compound as it would have appeared in 1836 (the real Alamo is in the middle of what is now Downtown San Antonio and is surrounded by modern skyscrapers). The set also includes a representation of the village of San Antonio de Béxar of the same time period. The construction of the set required over 1.5 million adobe bricks (manufactured on-site), 14 miles of gravel road, and a 4,000-foot runway.

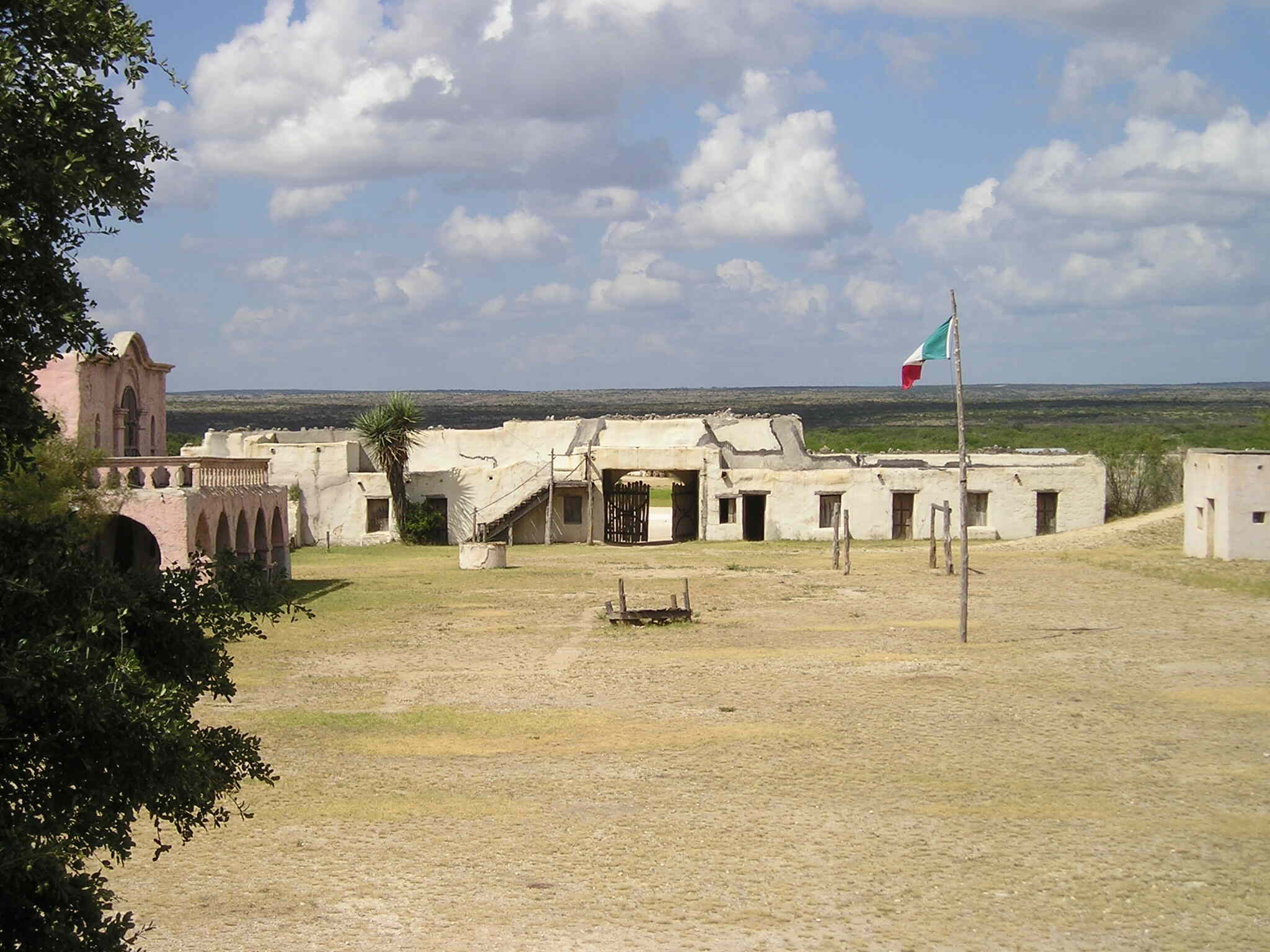
The full scale set for The Alamo.

Shahan preserved the set after the 1960 production ended, and over the years, more than a dozen films about the Alamo have been shot there. In addition, over 100 other western movies as well as documentaries, music videos and commercials have been shot using various parts of the set. Frank Thompson, a film historian, noted that each production changed the set in some way, big or small, and that the changes appear in each new movie about the Alamo, documenting the current view of authenticity over time. The 2004 Disney movie about the Alamo was not shot on this set, but in a new set built in Dripping Springs, Texas.

After the filming of the 1960 version of “The Alamo”, the village has served primarily as a tourist attraction. For several decades, it served as a significant local employer and an element of Brackettville’s economy. In addition to the replica of The Alamo, the village included a cantina and restaurant, a trading post, an Indian store, a church, a jail, a blacksmith shop, the John Wayne Western Museum, several museums, and a celebrity gallery. Alamo Village also maintained a collection of antique tools, vehicles, and other period props, as well as a herd of longhorn cattle. During the summer, live music and stage shows performed frequently, and over Labor Day weekend the Labor Day Horse Races brought crowds to the village. Alamo Village was open to visitors year-round except for December 21–26.

In 2004, the set was put up for sale by its owner, Virginia Shahan, Happy Shahan’s widow, for $3.0 million. Virginia Shahan died on June 23, 2009, at the age of 93. Alamo Village was closed to the public while her estate evaluated the feasibility of the village’s continued operation amid the late-2000s recession. Alamo Village temporarily reopened after the death of owner Virginia Shahan, but on September 28, 2009, Tulisha Shahan Wardlaw, Happy and Virginia’s daughter, died at the age of 67. Alamo Village then closed its doors and removed its website, ending an era.

Alamo Village reopened briefly for the summer in 2010 with limited hours and no shows, stores, or restaurants, but closed again within a few months. In 2014, Corpus Christi, Texas, businessman David Jones was raising funds to buy the site.

After an eight-year closure, the site reopened briefly in late January 2018, possibly for the last time. The event was a liquidation sale of all of the props. A news item at the time indicated that the future of the site was undecided.

== Selected filmography ==
- The Alamo (1960) - Produced, directed, and starring John Wayne
- Two Rode Together (1961) - starring James Stewart
- Bandolero! (1968) - starring James Stewart, Raquel Welch and Dean Martin
- Barbarosa (1982) - starring Willie Nelson
- Good As Gold (1983 music video) by Red Rockers
- Uphill All the Way (1986)
- Gone to Texas aka Houston: The Legend of Texas (November, 1986)
- The Alamo: Thirteen Days to Glory (1987)
- Alamo: The Price of Freedom (1988) - filmed in IMAX
- Lonesome Dove (1988) (TV) - starring Robert Duvall
- Travis (1991) (film/video) - starring Benton Jennings
- Bad Girls (1994)
- Once Upon a Time in China and America (1997) - a Chinese martial arts western.
- Bullfighter (2000)
- Jericho (2000)
- Call of the Wildman (2013)
