= The Name of the Band Is Cowboy Mouth =

- Starring: Fred LeBlanc; John Thomas Griffith; Regina Zernay; Vance DeGeneres
- Music by: Cowboy Mouth
- Distributed by: Valley Entertainment
- Release date: November 20, 2007
- Running time: 127 minutes
- Country: United States
- Language: English

The Name of the Band Is Cowboy Mouth is a live concert by the band Cowboy Mouth released on DVD on November 20, 2007. It is the first DVD, and second video of the band, the first being 1996's 'Alive' on VHS. In addition, they appear in a scene in the 1995 movie The Underneath. The DVD was recorded in front of a packed house at the Roxy On Sunset in Hollywood, California, during the summer of 2007. The title is a pun on a live concert by Talking Heads.

== Musicians on DVD ==
- Fred LeBlanc (lead vocals and drums)
- John Thomas Griffith (guitar and vocals)
- Vance DeGeneres (rhythm guitar, vocals)
- Regina Zernay (bass guitar and vocals)

== Special guests ==
According to Classic Drummer, the crowd at the concert included: Ellen DeGeneres (Vance's sister), Portia de Rossi, David Steinberg, Hanson, and music producer Matthew Wilder (No Doubt, Christina Aguilera, Kelly Clarkson). Mark Bryan, the guitarist for Hootie and The Blowfish, makes an on stage appearance, joining the band on the song "I Can Tell".

== Track listing ==
1. "Glad to Be Alive"
2. "Light It on Fire"
3. "Easy"
4. "I Know It Shows"
5. "I Can Tell"
6. "Take Me Back to New Orleans"
7. "Winds Me Up"
8. "Joe Strummer"
9. "Disconnected"
10. "Everybody Loves Jill"
11. "Love of My Life"
12. "Avenue"
13. "Tell the Girl"
14. "Man on the Run"
15. "This Much Fun"
16. "Jenny Says"
  Bonus footage:
17. "Anything"
18. "Walk Among the Angels"
19. "All I Really Want"
20. "Kelly Ripa"
21. "God Makes the Rain"
