= Mardi Gras (EP) =

EP by Cowboy Mouth
- Released: 2010
- Label: Valley Entertainment
- Producer: Fred LeBlanc

Cowboy Mouth chronology
Fearless (2008)	Mardi Gras (2010)

Mardi Gras is a Cowboy Mouth EP that was released in coordination with the band's 16th Annual Rock N' Roll Mardi Gras Tour. The album is composed of Mardi Gras themed music and an acoustic version of a song from the band's 2006 album Voodoo Shoppe.

== Track listing ==
1. "Iko Iko" (James "Sugar Boy" Crawford) - 2:38
2. "Hurry Up and Know It / Make You Love Me" (Ernie K-Doe) - 2:46
3. "Go to the Mardi Gras" (Professor Longhair) - 2:03
4. "Carnival Time" (Al Johnson) - 2:22
5. "The Avenue" (Acoustic) (Fred LeBlanc, John Thomas Griffith, Paul Sanchez) - 4:18

== Personnel ==
Cowboy Mouth

- Fred LeBlanc
- John Thomas Griffith
- Casandra Faulconer
- Matt Jones

with:

The Bonerama Horns
Mark Mullins
Craig Klein
Greg Hicks
