= Fred LeBlanc =

American musician

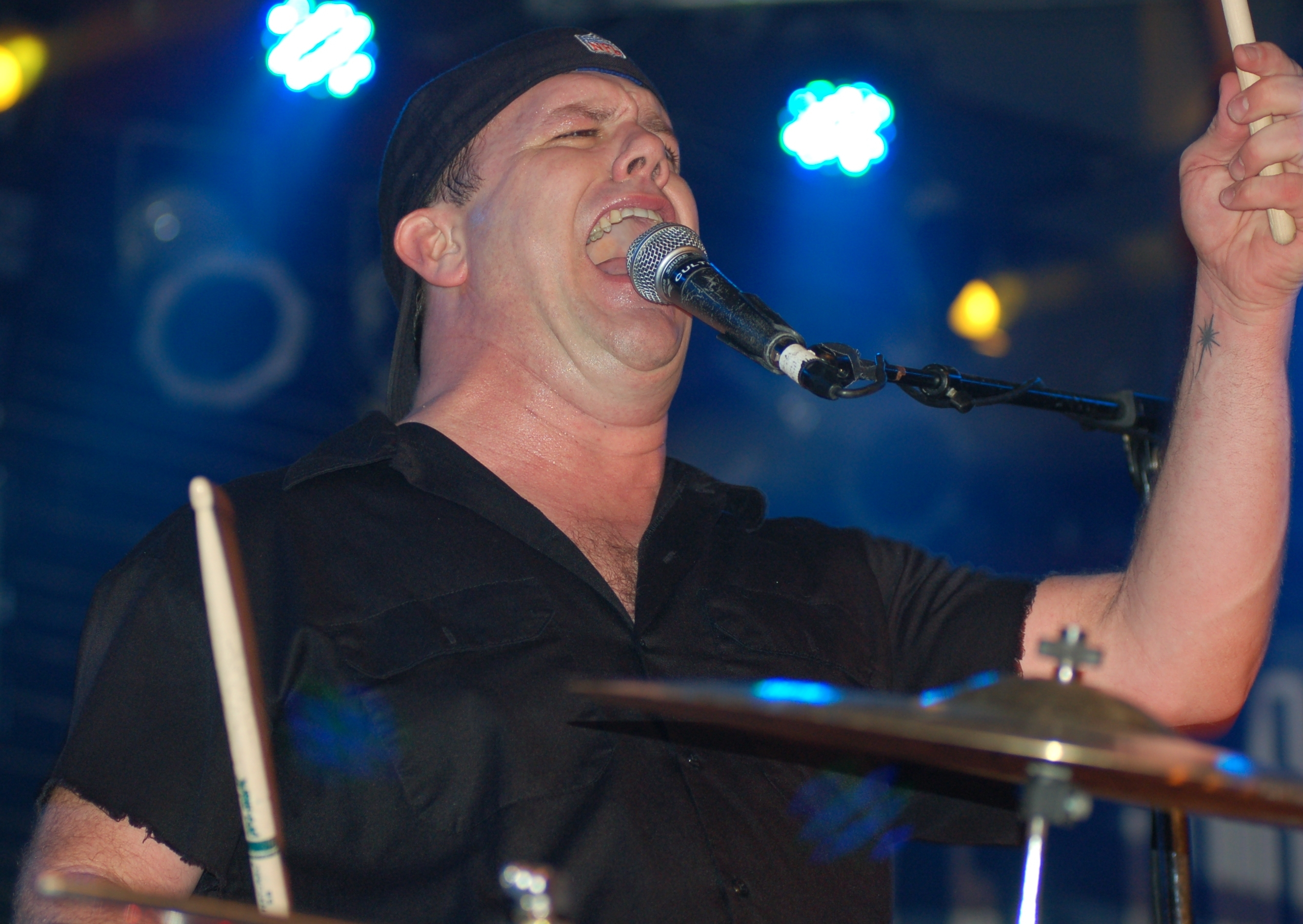
- LeBlanc performing in Fort Lauderdale, Florida, in January 2009

Background information
- Occupations: Musician, songwriter, record producer, author
- Instruments: Vocals, drums
- Years active: 1980s–present
- Website: Fred LeBlanc website

Fred LeBlanc is the lead singer/drummer for the New Orleans–based rock band Cowboy Mouth, and a freelance songwriter, record producer, short story author, and acoustic performer. Known for his "maniacal" performance style, and described as "a short, muscular guy with a heavy brow and piercingly intelligent eyes", LeBlanc has been called "one of the more instantly recognizable figures in contemporary Louisiana music."

== Biography ==
After graduating from Jesuit High School in New Orleans, LeBlanc began his career in the early 1980s as the drummer of the Backbeats, also from New Orleans, which featured many future members of Cowboy Mouth.

A year after the Backbeats disbanded in the mid-1980s, LeBlanc joined power trio Dash Rip Rock as drummer and as contributing songwriter and co-lead singer. The band was heavily influenced by the American roots music movement of the time, as well as the frenzied punk and rock stylings of both the Sex Pistols and Jerry Lee Lewis. To this mix, LeBlanc's songs usually had a very strong melodic component, with "Operator", "Blue Moon At Midnight", and "Go Home, Little Girl."

LeBlanc left Dash Rip Rock in mid-1989 and signed a deal as a solo artist with EMI Records. Although no recordings were ever released from his tenure with the label, LeBlanc has said that the year off from the road "gave me a chance to focus on my songwriting," with LeBlanc writing many songs during that time that would appear on various Cowboy Mouth recordings later on.

LeBlanc formed Cowboy Mouth in late 1990 with a lineup that has changed variously throughout the years, with the main constants being LeBlanc and John Thomas Griffith on guitar and vocals. The band has maintained a steady touring schedule since their formation, gaining notoriety for their live shows. LeBlanc has written much of Cowboy Mouth's material, such as "How Do You Tell Someone", "Love Of My Life", "Disconnected", "Take Me Back To New Orleans", "Easy", "Tell The Girl", "So Sad About Me", "The Avenue", and the band's signature song, "Jenny Says".

In addition to performing and recording with Cowboy Mouth, LeBlanc has worked as a producer. He produced A Different Story by Deadeye Dick. The album featured the song "New Age Girl", which earned the band and LeBlanc a gold record in the early 1990s and was included in the Jim Carrey movie Dumb And Dumber.

LeBlanc has produced material for Mark Bryan of Hootie & The Blowfish and albums for Dash Rip Rock, The Bingemen, and The Garden District. He has also released the solo albums Here On Earth, Shiver, Dammit (later expanded and re-released as Double Dammit), and Playing the Game of My Life and an album of spoken word short stories (also released as a book) called Always Give Thanks. In July 2010, LeBlanc said he would continue to release solo music during breaks in Cowboy Mouth's schedule.

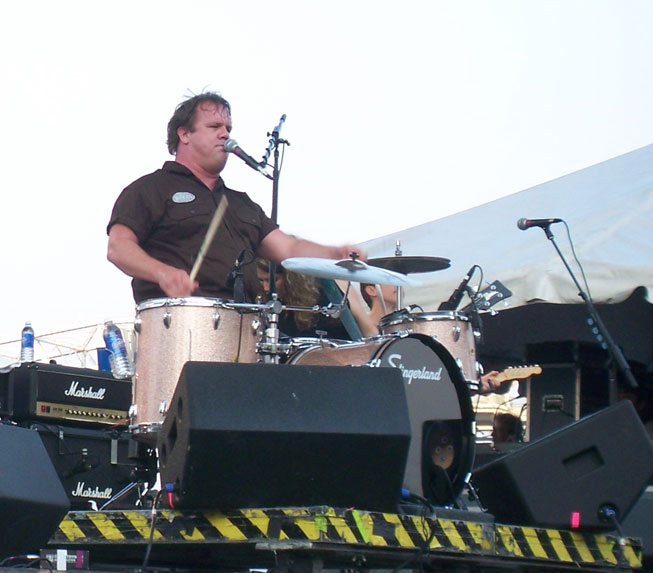
Fred LeBlanc performing in Nashville, 2007

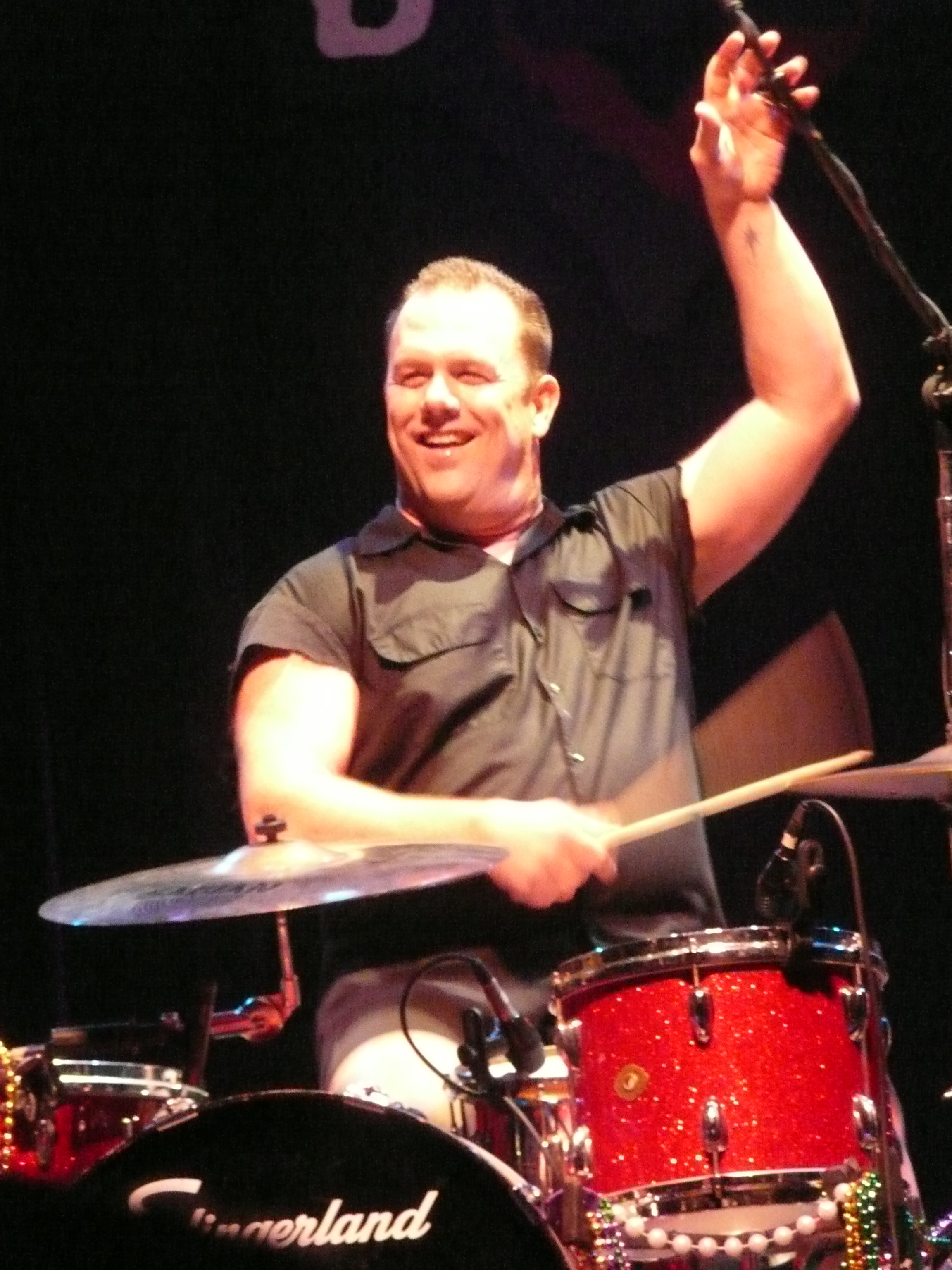
Fred LeBlanc smiling abashedly on Mardi Gras night in Houston, 2010, after all but losing his singing voice performing the night before in New Orleans.

== Discography ==
=== Cowboy Mouth studio albums ===
- Word of Mouth • 1992
- It Means Escape • 1994
- Are You with Me? • 1996
- Word of Mouth (Remix) • 1996
- Mercyland • 1998
- Easy • 2000
- Uh-Oh • 2003
- Voodoo Shoppe • 2006
- Fearless • 2008
- This Train... • 2012
- Go! • 2014

=== Cowboy Mouth live albums and EPs ===
- Mouthin' Off (Live & More) • 1993
- Mouthin' Off (Live & More) (Remastered) • 1997
- Cowboy Mouth LIVE! (limited edition 5-song EP issued with Mercyland) • 1998
- Live in the X Lounge "Jenny Says" • 1998 & 2001
- All You Need Is Live • 2000
- Live in the X Lounge "Easy" • 2000
- Uh Oh (5-song Preview EP) • 2003
- Live at the Zoo • 2004
- Mardi Gras • 2010
- This Train • 2013
- Go • 2014
- Open Wide • 2020

=== Cowboy Mouth live DVD ===
- The Name of the Band is Cowboy Mouth • 2007

=== Dash Rip Rock albums featuring work of Fred LeBlanc ===
- Dash Rip Rock (1987)
- Ace of Clubs (1989)
- Paydirt (1998) (producer only)
