= Regina Zernay Roberts =

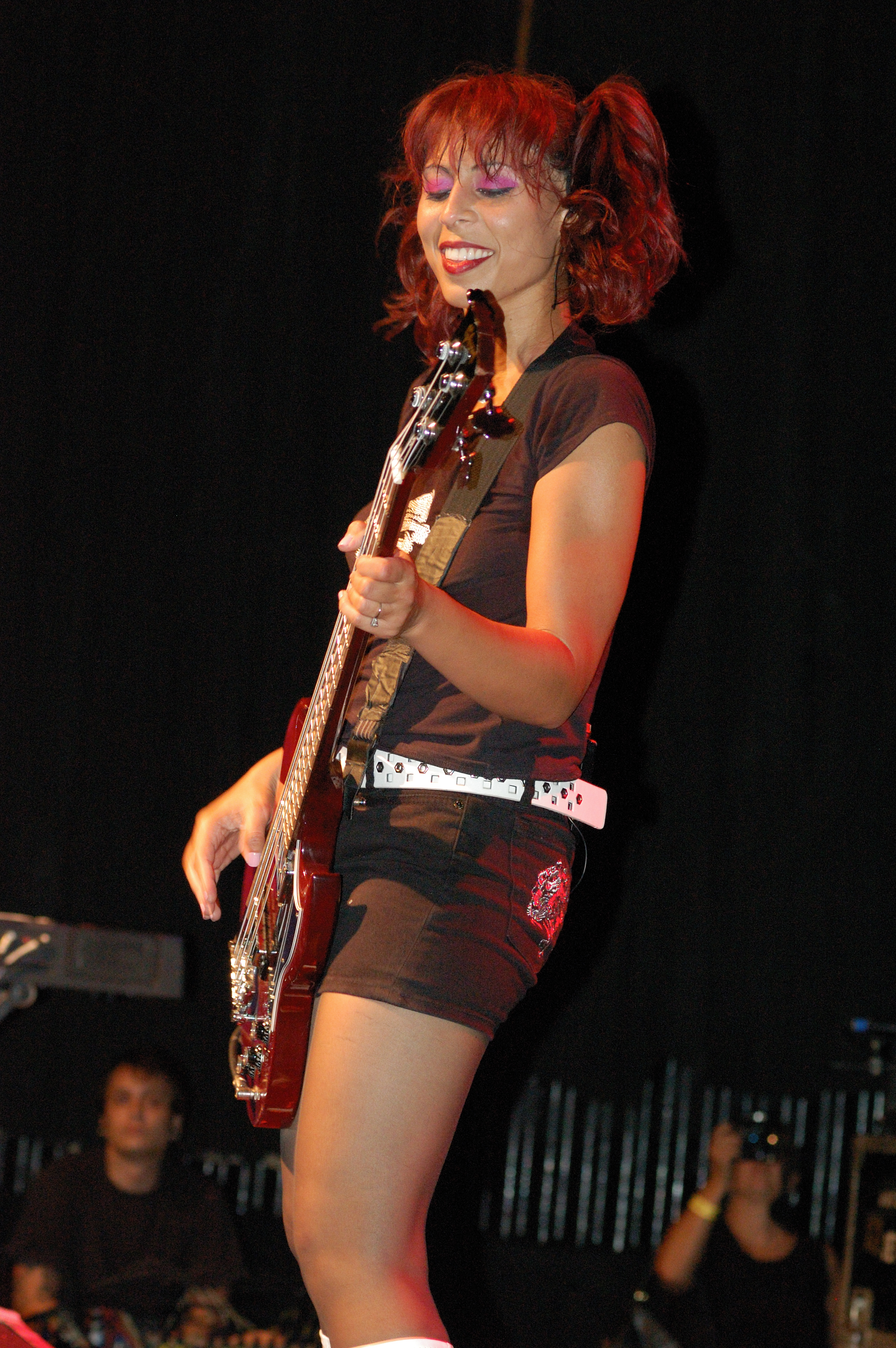
- Zernay Roberts performing at the Tampa Theater in 2009

Background information
- Born: Regina Zernay; December 5, 1972 (age 53); Queens, New York, United States
- Origin: Los Angeles, California, United States
- Genres: Rock, punk, metal, grunge
- Years active: 1994–present
- Label: Valley Entertainment
- Formerly of: Scarlet Fever, Cowboy Mouth, Jam Balaya, Méchant, Halfcocked
- Website: reginazernayroberts.com

Regina Zernay Roberts is an American instrumentalist, singer, and songwriter. She is lead singer and bass player of Detroit Diesel Power. She played bass guitar and Moog synthesizer with Scarlet Fever, the all-female backing band that toured with Cee Lo Green during 2010 and 2011. She toured several years in the New Orleans cowpunk band, Cowboy Mouth; was founding bassist/singer of Los Angeles punk rock band Méchant; and was bassist for the hard rock band, Halfcocked.

== Biography ==
Regina Zernay was born in Queens, New York, but grew up in a tiny Florida village. She is the first-born child of Polish and Filipino parents. After moving to La Puente in Los Angeles County, California, she graduated from Nogales High School and Azusa Pacific University. She married Darren Roberts in 2009.

=== Early years ===
Even as a young child, she wanted to be a musician. There was always a piano in the house. She took lessons until a conflict with her teacher about writing with her left hand. She began playing guitar at age 11, inspired by (her "first love as a teenager") Duran Duran. In high school, friends needed a bass guitarist for their band, her mother bought her one for Christmas, and she "totally fell in love with it." Although she is left-handed, she plays a standard right-handed instrument.

After high school, she did her first West Coast tour for two weeks with a band in small pickup, often in difficult living conditions; but nothing made her happier than playing bass. She polished her craft playing with many bands, in small clubs and venues throughout Southern California, sometimes three bands concurrently.

=== Influences ===
In addition to Duran Duran, in high school she played music by Social Distortion, the Dead Kennedys, Black Flag, Agent Orange, The Toy Dolls, and The Ramones. Later role models include John Paul Jones of Led Zeppelin, and Ben Shepherd from Soundgarden.

=== Breakout success ===
Zernay has played and recorded with many Southern California bands, such as Big Violin (their music was featured on The Real World), Ten Pound Troy, The Syrups, and Red Delicious. In 2001, she joined hard rock band Halfcocked (on the DreamWorks imprint Megatronic Records) during their final tour. She also performed with hip hop/rock band Jam Balaya, appearing on two episodes of Half & Half in 2005.

She was featured as the front-cover Bass Quarterly interview for the issue of January/February 2011, and was chosen number 3 of the top 10 bassists to watch in 2010.

More recently, she has toured with Red Elvises during November 2011 through December 2012.

=== Méchant ===
Circa late 2002, Zernay formed her own band, Méchant (French meaning "wicked"). She was the primary songwriter and original bassist for the band. One of their early tracks, "Sweet", was included in the short film Outta Moves in 2005. With the help of several musician friends, she began recording a second CD in 2005, Fate and The Arsenal. The band remained active until 2007.

=== Cowboy Mouth ===
From 2007 to 2010, Zernay performed with Cowboy Mouth, playing more than 200 shows annually, including a two-week USO tour in Kuwait and Iraq. During her time with them, Cowboy Mouth released the live concert DVD The Name of the Band is Cowboy Mouth and the full-length CD Fearless. They were also featured as a cartoon in The New Yorker, and performed on Live with Regis and Kelly twice.

=== Scarlet Fever ===
Beginning in June 2010, she toured with Cee Lo Green and the all-female backing band named Scarlet Fever on promotional tours for "What Part of Forever" (from The Twilight Saga: Eclipse soundtrack) and The Lady Killer album. They performed for The Tonight Show with Jay Leno, BBC Radio, Late Show with David Letterman, Saturday Night Live, and many other venues. Core band members include Sharon Aguilar (lead guitar, violin), Brittany Brooks (drums), and DANiiVORY née Theresa Flaminio (keyboards, background vocals).

=== Detroit Diesel Power ===
Circa late 2011, Zernay and her husband formed a punk band, Detroit Diesel Power. They debuted at Molly Malone's on July 2, 2013, and again at The Viper Room on July 23, 2013, both in Los Angeles, California. Other members include Patrick Jones (drums) and Michael Martinsson. Their first EP, "16:16", was released December 1, 2013.

== Discography ==
=== Albums with Méchant ===
- Fate and the Arsenal
- 2-Song EP

=== Albums with Cowboy Mouth ===
- Fearless

=== DVD with Cowboy Mouth ===
- The Name of the Band is Cowboy Mouth

=== Albums with Detroit Diesel Power ===
- 16:16
