= Voodoo Shoppe =

Studio album by Cowboy Mouth
- Released: February 21, 2006
- Label: Eleven Thirty
- Producers: Cowboy Mouth, Mike Mayeaux, Russ-T Cobb

Cowboy Mouth chronology
Uh-oh (2003)	Voodoo Shoppe (2006)	Fearless (2008)

Professional ratings
Review scores
Source	Rating
AllMusic	3.5/5 stars
Village Voice	(favourable)
PopMatters	(7/10)
ARTISTdirect	3.5/5 stars

Voodoo Shoppe is the tenth release and the seventh studio release of Cowboy Mouth.

Cowboy Mouth has associated themselves quite strongly with the city of New Orleans and the music scene in that city. Voodoo Shoppe was the first album produced by the band after Hurricane Katrina, and generated a fair bit of interest in the album because of this. Two songs, "Home" and "The Avenue" address the diaspora after Hurricane Katrina, as well as pledging to return to New Orleans to rebuild. Portions of the proceeds were donated to Renew Our Music (formerly the New Orleans Musician's Relief Fund). John Thomas Griffith sits upon their board.

They performed Home and Voodoo Shoppe as part of Starz' New Orleans Music in Exile documentary. During an interview for that show, Fred LeBlanc admitted to not being able to move home, saying, "I live in the tour bus. We all live in the tour bus."

The song "This Much Fun" was featured in the trailer for Meet the Robinsons (2007), but not used in the actual movie or on the soundtrack album.

== Track listing ==
1. "Joe Strummer" (Fred LeBlanc, John Thomas Griffith, Paul Sanchez, Mary Lasange, Mitch Allen) – 3:35
2. "Misty Falls" (Griffith, LeBlanc, Sanchez) – 3:26
3. "Winds Me Up" (LeBlanc, Griffith, Sanchez, Lasange) – 3:33
4. "Hole in My Heart" (Griffith, LeBlanc, Sanchez) – 3:57
5. "Voodoo Shoppe" (Griffith, LeBlanc, Sanchez) – 3:54
6. "Slow Down" (LeBlanc, Griffith, Sanchez, Lasange) – 3:36
7. "This Much Fun" (Griffith, LeBlanc, Sanchez) – 2:45
8. "Supersonic" (Sonia Tetlow, Griffith, LeBlanc, Sanchez) – 2:35
9. "I Told Ya" (Griffith, LeBlanc, Sanchez, Lasange) – 3:17
10. "Home" (Griffith, LeBlanc, Sanchez, Tetlow) – 3:12
11. "Glad to Be Alive" (Griffith, LeBlanc, Sanchez, Tetlow, Russ-T Cobb) – 3:34
12. "The Avenue" (Griffith, LeBlanc, Sanchez, Tetlow) – 3:55

== Singles ==
- "The Avenue"
- "Joe Strummer"

== Personnel ==
Cowboy Mouth

- Fred LeBlanc – drums, lead vocals
- John Thomas Griffith – guitar, vocals
- Sonia Tetlow – bass guitar
- Paul Sanchez – guitar

with:

- Stewart Cararas – engineering and gang vocal
- Mitch Allan – producer (tracks 1–3)
