= Are You with Me? (album) =

Studio album by Cowboy Mouth
- Released: July 2, 1996
- Recorded: before, during and after Mardi Gras 1996
- Studio: The Egyptian Room, New Orleans, Louisiana
- Label: MCA
- Producer: Mike Wanchie

Cowboy Mouth chronology
It Means Escape (1994)	Are You with Me? (1996)	Word of Mouth (Remix) (1996)

Professional ratings
Review scores
Source	Rating
AllMusic	4/5 stars

Are You with Me? is an album by the rock band Cowboy Mouth, released in 1996. It was their major label debut (MCA) and charted at 192 of the Billboard 200; it produced the single "Jenny Says," which charted on two Billboard charts.

== Track listing ==
Are You with Me? track listing
No.	Title	Writer(s)	Length
1	"Jenny Says"	Fred LeBlanc	3:17
2	"How Do You Tell Someone"	Fred LeBlanc	3:42
3	"God Makes the Rain"	Fred LeBlanc	4:12
4	"Take It Out on Me"	Fred LeBlanc	4:07
5	"Light It on Fire"	Paul Sanchez	3:19
6	"Laughable"	Paul Sanchez	3:38
7	"Love of My Life"	Fred LeBlanc	3:11
8	"So Sad About Me"	Fred LeBlanc	3:13
9	"Man on the Run"	Paul Sanchez; John Thomas Griffith	3:47
10	"Louisiana Lowdown"	Paul Sanchez	3:40
11	"New Orleans"	Fred LeBlanc	3:13
12	"Peacemaker"	Paul Sanchez; John Thomas Griffith	3:52

== Personnel ==
Cowboy Mouth

- John Thomas Griffith – lead guitar, vocals
- Paul Sanchez – acoustic and rhythm guitar, vocals
- Rob Savoy – bass, vocals
- Fred LeBlanc – drums, percussion, guitar, vocals

with:

- Peter Holsapple – organ, piano, accordion, mandolin, guitar
- John Maloney – washboard

Technical

- David Leonard – recording
- Kevin Reagan – art direction
- Jean Krikorian – design
- James Minchin III – photography
