= New Age Girl =

1994 single by Deadeye Dick

Single by Deadeye Dick

from the album A Different Story and Dumb and Dumber: Original Motion Picture Soundtrack
- B-side: "Si certo qui si non sapere niente"; "Sentimental Crap"; "Perfect Family"
- Released: June 1, 1994
- Length: 3:03
- Label: Ichiban
- Songwriter: Caleb Guillotte
- Producer: Fred LeBlanc

Deadeye Dick singles chronology
"New Age Girl" (1994)	"Paralyze Me" (1995)

"New Age Girl" is a song by American alternative rock trio Deadeye Dick, released as their debut single in June 1994 from their first album, Different Story (1994), and from the soundtrack to the 1994 film Dumb and Dumber. Its use in Dumb and Dumber widened the song's popularity, and it peaked at number 27 on the US Billboard Hot 100 chart in January 1995. It became their only top-40 hit, ensuring their one-hit wonder status.

== Background ==
"New Age Girl" originated from a riff that Caleb Guillotte thought of in the shower. After being recorded on a cassette alongside four other songs, the track became a local radio hit, prompting Ichiban Records to sign the band. Clive Davis of Arista Records attempted to sign the band afterwards and rerecord "New Age Girl", but the band decided against it.

The song features lyrics about a socially conscious vegetarian girl named Mary Moon, with the infamous lyric "She don't eat meat, but she sure likes the bone." (Some radio stations aired an edited version of the song that obscured the word "bone".) Guillotte has said of the song:

I wouldn’t blame anybody for taking me lightly as a lyricist if they listen to that song, because it's just a silly, facile song that didn't require a great deal of thought or emotional investment, obviously. It did almost write it itself. One thing it did do is it absolutely worked for what it needed to be. The music sounded rock-ish, but that riff could almost sound a little comedic. They supported each other. I think that had a lot to do with the song's success.

== Release ==
"New Age Girl" was released on the band's 1994 debut album, A Different Story. The song then appeared in the comedy film Dumb and Dumber and was released by RCA as the first single from the soundtrack. RCA also created a video for the song, which featured pumpkin-headed people running on a farm. The song peaked at number 27 on the US Billboard Hot 100.

"New Age Girl" was ultimately the band's only hit, with many labeling the band a one-hit wonder. Caleb Guillotte later reflected that, had the song not been a hit, "Maybe people would have been more prepared to think of us as the 'cool' band. There's all sorts of woulda, coulda, shoulda's. But we were very fortunate. Even if we didn't get to live out some sort of permanent rock 'n' roll dream, we got a nice ride." Guillotte ultimately concluded, "There's so much in my life after Deadeye Dick that was benefitted positively by the fact that Deadeye Dick had a hit song."

In 2021, Deadeye Dick released a 2003 re-recording of "New Age Girl" after the original version of the song was made unavailable on streaming services, including Spotify and Apple Music, because of rights issues resulting from the 1999 bankruptcy of Ichiban Records.

== Track listings ==
US and European maxi-CD single

1. "New Age Girl" (album) – 3:29
2. "Si certo qui si non sapere niente" – 2:24
3. "Sentimental Crap" – 2:46
4. "New Age Girl" (Dervish mix) – 3:29
5. "New Age Girl" (karaoke/instrumental) – 3:29

US cassette single

1. "New Age Girl"
2. "Sentimental Crap"

US 7-inch single

A. "New Age Girl" – 3:29
B. "Perfect Family" – 2:26

UK CD single

1. "New Age Girl (Mary Moon)"
2. "New Age Girl (Mary Moon)" (the Boneless mix)
3. "New Age Girl (Mary Moon)" (Dervish mix)

UK cassette single

1. "New Age Girl (Mary Moon)"
2. "New Age Girl (Mary Moon)" (the Boneless mix)

== Charts ==
Chart (1994–1995)	Peak position
Iceland (Íslenski Listinn Topp 40)	35
US Billboard Hot 100	27
US Top 40/Mainstream (Billboard)	15
US Cash Box Top 100	22

== Release history ==
Region	Date	Format(s)	Label(s)	Ref.
United States	June 1, 1994	Modern rock radio	Ichiban	
United States	June 8, 1994	Top 40 radio	Ichiban	
United States	June 23, 1994	Album rock radio	Ichiban	
United States	July 5, 1994	CD	Ichiban	
United Kingdom	February 6, 1995	CD; cassette	Ichiban; Intercord; Chrysalis	
United Kingdom	February 27, 1995	7-inch vinyl	Ichiban; Intercord; Chrysalis	
