= Jenny Says =

Single by Cowboy Mouth

from the album Word of Mouth
- Released: 1992, 1996
- Recorded: 1992
- Genre: Alternative rock
- Length: 3:03
- Songwriter: Fred LeBlanc

"Jenny Says" is a song by Cowboy Mouth, written by drummer and lead singer Fred LeBlanc from the band's 1992 first studio album, Word of Mouth. The song was first released by Dash Rip Rock on the album Ace of Clubs in 1989, for which Fred LeBlanc was a member of at the time. Cowboy Mouth later re-recorded the song in 1996 for their debut major label album Are You with Me?, which was released as a single. It is Cowboy Mouth's most successful single to date. Traditionally, Cowboy Mouth ends each concert with this song, and it has been released on several live albums since its release. It was also released on the DVD The Name of the Band Is Cowboy Mouth on November 20, 2007.

== Chart performance ==
In 1997, "Jenny Says" reached number 26 on the Billboard Mainstream Rock Tracks chart and number 33 on the Modern Rock Tracks chart.
