= Uh-Oh (Cowboy Mouth album) =

Uh-oh

Studio album by Cowboy Mouth
- Released: July 29, 2003
- Label: Eleven Thirty Records

Cowboy Mouth chronology
| Easy (2000) | Uh-oh (2003) | Voodoo Shoppe (2006) |

Professional ratings
Review scores
| Source | Rating |
|---|---|
| Allmusic | link |
| PopMatters | Unfavorable link |
| ARTISTdirect | link |

Uh-oh is the sixth studio album by American rock group Cowboy Mouth.

== Track listing ==
1. "Tomorrow Never Knows"
2. "Disconnected"
3. "Tell The Girl"
4. "Friends"
5. "Uh-Oh"
6. "So Much the Better"
7. "Can't Stay Here"
8. "Better"
9. "Invincible"
10. "Be That Way"
11. "Trouble"
12. "Senseless"
13. "Bad Girl"

== Personnel ==
Cowboy Mouth

- Fred LeBlanc – drums, lead vocals
- John Thomas Griffith – guitar, vocals
- Mary LaSang – bass guitar, vocals
- Paul Sanchez – guitar
