= The Sons (band) =

English rock band

- Origin: Derbyshire, England
- Genres: Alternative rock, pop, Britpop, pop rock
- Years active: 2002–2015
- Labels: Popup Records (2008–2013); Cannon Fodder Recordings (2011–2015)
- Past members: Lee Blades; Stewart English; Paul Herron; Steven Herron; Roger Millichamp; Ken Reeves; Matt Dewsnap; Matthew Paton
- Website: www.the-sons.com

The Sons were an English, Derbyshire-based alternative rock band, though their music incorporates sounds from various other genres, including rhythm and blues, folk and country, with a heavy emphasis on intricately layered musical composition and lyrical complexity. The Sons' last line-up was composed of lead singer/main songwriter and guitarist/pianist Paul Herron, multi-instrumentalist and vocalist Steven Herron, guitarist and vocalist Stewart English, bassist Lee Blades, and percussionist Roger Millichamp.

The band runs their own record label Cannon Fodder Recordings.

== History ==
=== Early days ===
The Sons' origins trace back to 1994, when Paul Herron met Ken Reeves while attending the University of Derby and the two of them, both aspiring singer/songwriters and guitarists, decided to form a band. Herron and Reeves soon recruited a bass player, Lee Blades, and a drummer, Matt Dewsnap, by hanging up posters around campus. When Herron and Reeves discovered that Blades lived only two doors down from their house on Uttoxeter New Road, Derby, the quartet adopted the name "New Road" as their band name.

New Road continued to play local venues like The Garrick in and around Derby until Reeves left for southern England in 1996. Before Reeves’ departure, New Road connected with Stewart English, the owner of Clostrophobia Recording Studios on Agard Street in Derby, and began recording one of the first of the band’s many demos. Unfortunately, English was later forced to close his studio, but quickly joined New Road – though, soon after the addition of English, Dewsnap left the group due to friendly but creative differences, and was replaced by Matthew Paton.

The change in line-up inspired a change in name – from New Road to Sub-marine – and the band continued to hone their skills by playing shows in their native Derby, London and France.

=== The Sons ===
In 2003, the band self-financed and released their first single "One Man Floats", followed by the four track EP1 in 2004. The release of "One Man Floats" required the band to settle on a permanent name, and after drawing up a list of possibilities, they settled on The Sons.

=== Visiting Hours and Popup-Records ===
After promoting several demos without being signed by a label, the band decided to produce and distribute their first album, Visiting Hours in 2007, followed by a seven-date British tour in the summer of 2008.

=== The Prime Words Committee and American release ===
The Prime Words Committee was recorded at Snug Recording Co. in Derby between May 2010 and February 2011. The thirteen tracks on the album were selected from nineteen completed tracks and the remaining six were set aside for future B-sides. At the special request of a Swiss fan that had previously seen the band at Gaswerk, The Sons flew into Zurich and played a private party at Portier in Winterthur on 10 September 2011.

The Sons' Heading Into Land won the award for "Adult Contemporary Album" at The 2015 14th Annual Independent Music Awards.

== Style ==
In a 2011 interview with the Derby Telegraph, The Sons’ main songwriter, Paul Herron, said of his writing style:

"I tend to write about quite dark themes for some reason and The Prime Words Committee has songs on it about plane crashes and things like that! But it's not in a horrible, black way; that darkness is combined with the happier, hopeful melodies we've come up with. Writing like that isn't a particularly conscious thing but I think it comes from a dislike of love songs. I'd much rather write about something darker than a load of cliché stuff about love and happiness. "

== Touring ==
- The Sons first European tour dates (2009)
- Paul Herron solo acoustic (2009)
- The Reeperbahn Festival (2009)
- The Sons second European tour (2009)
- The Sons third European tour (2010)

== Discography ==
=== Singles and EPs ===
- "One Man Floats" (2003)
- EP1 (2004)

=== Albums ===
- Visiting Hours (2007)
- The Prime Words Committee (2011)
- Heading Into Land (2014)
