= Fearless (Cowboy Mouth album) =

Studio album by Cowboy Mouth
- Released: September 23, 2008
- Label: Valley Entertainment

Cowboy Mouth chronology
Voodoo Shoppe (2006)	Fearless (2008)	Mardi Gras (2010)

Professional ratings
Review scores
Source	Rating
NeuFutur	4/10 stars

Fearless is Cowboy Mouth's eleventh release and eighth studio album, released September 23, 2008.

== Track listing ==
1. "Anything"
2. "Belly"
3. "Tell the Girl Ur Sorry"
4. "I Believe"
5. "Kelly Ripa"
6. "Kiss da Baby"
7. "Outside Looking In"
8. "Follow Me"
9. "Disconnected"
10. "Drown"
11. "The Lord Knows I'm Drinkin' "
12. "Maureen"
13. "Fearless Commercial"

== Personnel ==
Cowboy Mouth

- Fred LeBlanc – drums, lead vocals
- John Thomas Griffith – guitar, vocals
- Regina Zernay – bass guitar, vocals
- Jonathan Pretus – guitar, vocals
