= Good as Gold (Red Rockers album) =

Studio album by Red Rockers
- Released: 1983
- Genre: New wave; post-punk
- Label: Columbia; 415
- Producer: David Kahne

Red Rockers chronology
Condition Red (1981)	Good as Gold (1983)	Schizophrenic Circus (1984)

Alternative cover
- "Good as Gold" single

Professional ratings
Review scores
Source	Rating
AllMusic	3/5 stars

Good as Gold is the second full-length album from Red Rockers, released in 1983 on Columbia/415. It contained the single "China" which peaked at number 53 on the Billboard Hot 100. Other singles from the album were "Til It All Falls Down" and the title track, "Good as Gold". The music video for the song "Good as Gold" was filmed at the Alamo Village - the same location where John Wayne shot the film, The Alamo.

== Track listing ==
1. "China"
2. "Good as Gold"
3. "Dreams Fade Away"
4. "Change the World Around"
5. "Answers to the Question"
6. "Til It All Falls Down"
7. "Running Away from You"
8. "Fanfare for Metropolis"
9. "(Come On Into) My House"
10. "Home Is Where the War Is"
