= Deadeye Dick (band) =

American alternative rock trio

- Members of Deadeye Dick

Background information
- Origin: New Orleans, Louisiana, U.S.
- Genre: Alternative rock
- Years active: 1991–1996
- Label: Ichiban Records
- Past members: Caleb Guillotte; Mark Adam Miller; Billy Landry
- Website: myspace.com/deadeyedick

Deadeye Dick was an American alternative rock trio that was formed in New Orleans, Louisiana.

== History ==
The band, which consisted of vocalist/guitarist Caleb Guillotte, bassist Mark Adam Miller, and drummer Billy Landry, was formed in 1991 and took their name from the Kurt Vonnegut novel of the same name. The group built up a loyal following touring the Southeastern U.S. They self-produced their first album even though they still had not landed a record deal. A song titled "New Age Girl" from this self-published record became popular regionally and earned airplay in New Orleans and Atlanta. After receiving this airplay, the band landed a record deal with the independent label Ichiban Records. Ichiban released the group's debut album A Different Story in 1994. After its release, the song "New Age Girl" was selected for inclusion on the Dumb and Dumber feature film soundtrack. The publicity from the film caused the song to become a national hit, peaking at No. 27 on the Billboard Hot 100 in March 1995. The band released their second album, Whirl, in 1995 but were unable to reproduce the success produced by "New Age Girl". Deadeye Dick later disbanded.

== After disbandment ==
Caleb Guillotte (born March 13, 1963), the band's former singer, lead guitarist and principal songwriter, currently works primarily in the New Orleans film industry in Art and Set Decoration.

Guillotte and former bandmate Mark Miller continue to remain active in the local New Orleans music scene as producers. Guillotte continues to perform locally, writing for, co-writing and playing with other artists such as Mark Miller, Susan Cowsill, Vicki Peterson of the Bangles, Paul Sanchez (formerly of Cowboy Mouth), and others.

== Discography ==
Year	Title	Label	Other information
1994	"New Age Girl"	Ichiban Records	CD single
1994	A Different Story	Ichiban Records	
1995	Whirl	Ichiban Records	
1995	"Paralyze Me"	Ichiban Records	CD single
1999	In Effect Groovy	Independently produced	Unreleased album, available directly from the band's Myspace page
2015	The Vault	Independently produced	
