= Paul Sanchez =

American singer-songwriter

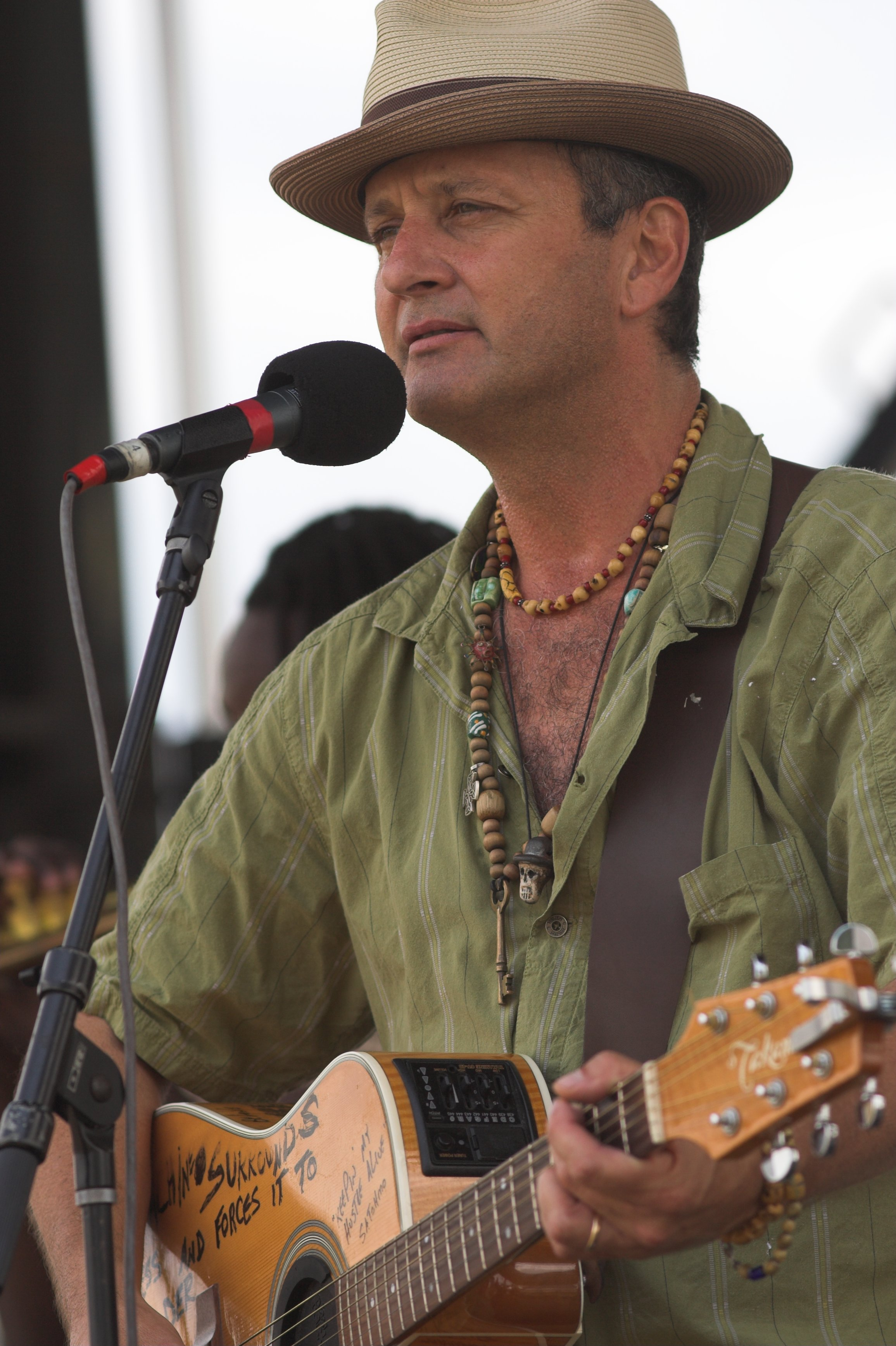
- Paul Sanchez at Mid-City Bayou Boogaloo, 2008

Background information
- Also known as: Poppy
- Born: November 6, 1959 (age 66); New Orleans
- Genres: Folk rock, R&B, jazz, blues
- Occupation: musician
- Instruments: guitar, vocals
- Years active: 1990–present
- Label: Threadhead Records
- Formerly of: Cowboy Mouth
- Website: PaulSanchez.com

Paul Sanchez (born November 6, 1959) is a New Orleans–based American guitarist and a singer-songwriter. Sanchez was a founding member of the New Orleans band Cowboy Mouth. He was a guitarist and one of the primary singers and songwriters for the band from 1990 to 2006. Sanchez's songs have appeared in films and on television and have been performed by various artists such as Darius Rucker, Irma Thomas, Michael Cerveris, Susan Cowsill, Kevin Griffin and The Eli Young Band, Hootie and the Blowfish, John Boutté, Shamarr Allen, Glen Andrews and Kim Carson.

== Life and career ==
Sanchez was born in New Orleans on the River Road along the levee of the Mississippi River. He grew up in New Orleans' blue-collar Irish Channel neighborhood, which is a historic home to stevedores and river pilots. Sanchez is a songwriter, musician, singer, producer, writer and actor. In January 2010, Off Beat Magazine gave Paul three Best of the Beat Awards; Songwriter of The Year, Best Song of the Year, and Best Folk/Rock Album for Stew Called New Orleans, which was his duet record with friend and collaborator John Boutté. In April of that same year, Gambit Weekly awarded him Best Roots Rock Performer at The Big Easy Awards.

His first musical endeavor was in the New Orleans band The Backbeats. Along with him was Vance DeGeneres, Steve Walters, and a drummer named Fred LeBlanc, who he would encounter later on.

In the late 1980s, Sanchez was playing in anti-folk genre, during his stint in New York. There he befriended artists Brenda Kahn, John S. Hall and Roger Manning.

He has released 11 CDs as a solo artist, while also releasing 11 CDs as a founding member of the New Orleans rock band Cowboy Mouth. He left the "Mouth" in 2006, just after a flood had upended the city of New Orleans. Sanchez was on tour with the Mouth when Hurricane Katrina ravaged the gulf. After that, he stayed on tour and wrote a post-Katrina tribute, "Home", which was featured in the Starz documentary New Orleans Music in Exile.

In 2008, Sanchez released the rewritten version of his first solo release Jet Black & Jealous. The Eli Young Band made the song title their major label debut on Universal/Republic. Jet Black & Jealous made its debut at number 5 on the Billboard Country Album Charts in September 2008. In 2009, he published a book of essays entitled Pieces Of Me, which deals with such things as the sense of life, loss, and rebuilding after the flood.

Primarily a songwriter, Paul has written songs with and for John Boutté, Shamarr Allen, Darius Rucker of Hootie and The Blowfish, Galactic, Glen David Andrews, Irma Thomas, Matt Perrine, Tony Award Winning actor Michael Cerveris, Vance DeGeneres, Susan Cowsill, Debbie Davis, Arsene DeLay, John Thomas Griffith, John Rankin, Kevin Griffin of Better Than Ezra, The Eli Young Band, Caleb Guillotte of Dead-Eye Dick and many more.

For the last few years, Sanchez has been writing, recording and performing a musical adaptation of New York Times Best Seller Nine Lives. Nine Lives has been performed in New York City at Symphony Space, Washington DC at Sixth & I, Los Angeles at Fais Do-Do and New Orleans at Le Petite Theater, The CAC, The Ellis Marsalis Center, and Tulane University's Dixon Hall.

He has appeared on the HBO series Treme as himself.

== Discography ==
=== Cowboy Mouth studio albums ===
- Word of Mouth · 1992
- It Means Escape · 1994
- Are You With Me? · 1996
- Word of Mouth (Remix1) · 1996
- Mercyland · 1998
- Easy · 2000
- Uh Oh · 2003
- Voodoo Shoppe · 2006

=== Cowboy Mouth live albums and EPs ===
- Mouthin' Off (Live & More) · 1993
- Mouthin' Off (Live & More) (Remastered) · 1997
- Cowboy Mouth LIVE! (limited edition 5-song EP issued with Mercyland) · 1998
- Live in the X Lounge "Jenny Says" · 1998
- All You Need Is Live · 2000
- Live in the X Lounge "Easy" · 2000 & 2001
- Uh Oh (5-song Preview EP) · 2003
- Live at the Zoo · 2004

=== Solo albums ===
- Life Is a Ride 2017
- Magus Insipiens: 3 Song Cycles on Poems by Taliesin, Payne, and Sapho 2016, with Kayleen Sanchez
- Heart Renovations 2016
- Everything That Ends Begins Again 2014
- Reclamation Of The Pie-Eyed Piper 2012, Paul Sanchez and the Rolling Road Show
- Nine Lives – A Musical Story of New Orleans (The Complete Set) 2012
- Nine Lives – A Musical Story of New Orleans (Volume One) 2011
- Red Beans and Ricely Yours 2010
- Bridging the Gap 2010, Shamarr Allen & Paul Sanchez
- Farewell To Storyville 2009
- Stew Called New Orleans 2009
- Exit to Mystery Street 2008, produced by Dave Pirner (Soul Asylum). Featuring guest appearances by Ivan Neville, Shamarr Allen, Susan Cowsill, James Andrews, Fredy Omar, & Craig Klein
- Washed Away 2007, a compilation of songs from his first 6 recordings, all lost in the levee failure in New Orleans
- Between Friends 2007, featuring guest appearances by Darius Rucker, John Boutte', Theresa Anderson, Jim Sonefeld, & Susan Cowsill.
- Hurricane Party 2000, produced by Tim Sommer. Featuring guest appearances by Susan Cowsill, Vicki Peterson of The Bangles, Peter Holsapple, & John Boutte'
- Live at Carrollton Station 1999, produced by Mike Mayeux
- Sonoma Valley 1998, produced by Mike Mayeux. Guest appearances by Susan Cowsill, John Boutte' & John Thomas Griffith
- Loose Parts 1997, produced by Peter Holsapple. Guest appearance by Susan Cowsill
- Wasted Lives & Bluegrass 1995
- Jet Black and Jealous 1993, recorded by Roger Manning

== Awards and recognition ==
Year	Awarding body	Award	Result	Reference
2023	Offbeat Magazine Best of the Beat Award	Best Country / Folk / Singer-Songwriter Album (for Between Friends... And Me)	Won	
2019	Offbeat Magazine Best of the Beat Award	Best Roots Rock Band or Performer	Won	
2019	Offbeat Magazine Best of the Beat Award	Best Roots Rock Album (for I'm a Song, I'm a Story, I'm a Ghost)	Won	
2018	Offbeat Magazine Best of the Beat Award	Song of the Year (for "One More Trip Around the Sun," with John Rankin)	Won	
2018	Offbeat Magazine Best of the Beat Award	Best Roots Rock Band or Performer	Won	
2018	Offbeat Magazine Best of the Beat Award	Best Roots Rock Album (for One More Trip Around the Sun)	Won	
2017	Offbeat Magazine Best of the Beat Award	Allen Toussaint Award Songwriter of the Year	Won	
2016	Offbeat Magazine Best of the Beat Award	Best Country/Folk/Singer-Songwriter Artist	Won	
2016	Offbeat Magazine Best of the Beat Award	Songwriter of the Year	Nominated	
2016	Offbeat Magazine Best of the Beat Award	Best Country/Folk/Singer-Songwriter Album (for Heart Renovations)	Nominated	
2015	Offbeat Magazine Best of the Beat Award	Song of the Year (for Everything That Ends Begins Again)	Nominated	
2015	Offbeat Magazine Best of the Beat Award	Best Roots Rock Artist	Nominated	
2015	Offbeat Magazine Best of the Beat Award	Best Roots Rock Album (for The World is Round Everything That Ends Begins Again)	Nominated	
2015	Offbeat Magazine Best of the Beat Award	Songwriter of the Year	Nominated	
2014	Offbeat Magazine Best of the Beat Award	Songwriter of The Year	Won	
2014	Offbeat Magazine Best of the Beat Award	Best Roots Rock Artist	Nominated	
2013	Offbeat Magazine Best of the Beat Award	Songwriter of The Year	Nominated	
2012	Offbeat Magazine Best of the Beat Award	Best Roots Rock Artist	Nominated	
2012	Offbeat Magazine Best of the Beat Award	Best Roots Rock Album (for Reclamation of the Pie-Eyed Piper, with the Rolling Road Show)	Nominated	
2012	Offbeat Magazine Best of the Beat Award	Songwriter of the Year	Nominated	
2011	Offbeat Magazine Best of the Beat Award	Best Roots Rock Album (for Nine Lives, A Musical Adaption (Volume 1), with Colman deKay)	Nominated	
2011	Offbeat Magazine Best of the Beat Award	Album of the Year (for Nine Lives, A Musical Adaption (Volume 1), with Colman deKay)	Nominated	
2011	Offbeat Magazine Best of the Beat Award	Song of the Year (for Could Have Been Worse by Paul Sanchez, Colman deKay, Irma Thomas)	Nominated	
2011	Offbeat Magazine Best of the Beat Award	Song of the Year (for Rebuild, Renew by Paul Sanchez, Colman deKay, Shamarr Allen)	Nominated	
2010	Gambit Big Easy Music Awards	Best Roots Rock	Won	
2009	Offbeat Magazine Best of the Beat Award	Best Song of the Year (for "Hey, God" with John Boutte)	Won	
2009	Offbeat Magazine Best of the Beat Award	Best Folk/Rock Album (for Stew Called New Orleans, duet record with friend and collaborator John Boutte)	Won	
2009	Offbeat Magazine Best of the Beat Award	Songwriter of The Year	Won	
2000	Gambit Weekly readers' poll	Songwriter of the Year	Won	
