= Betty DeGeneres =

American activist (born 1930)

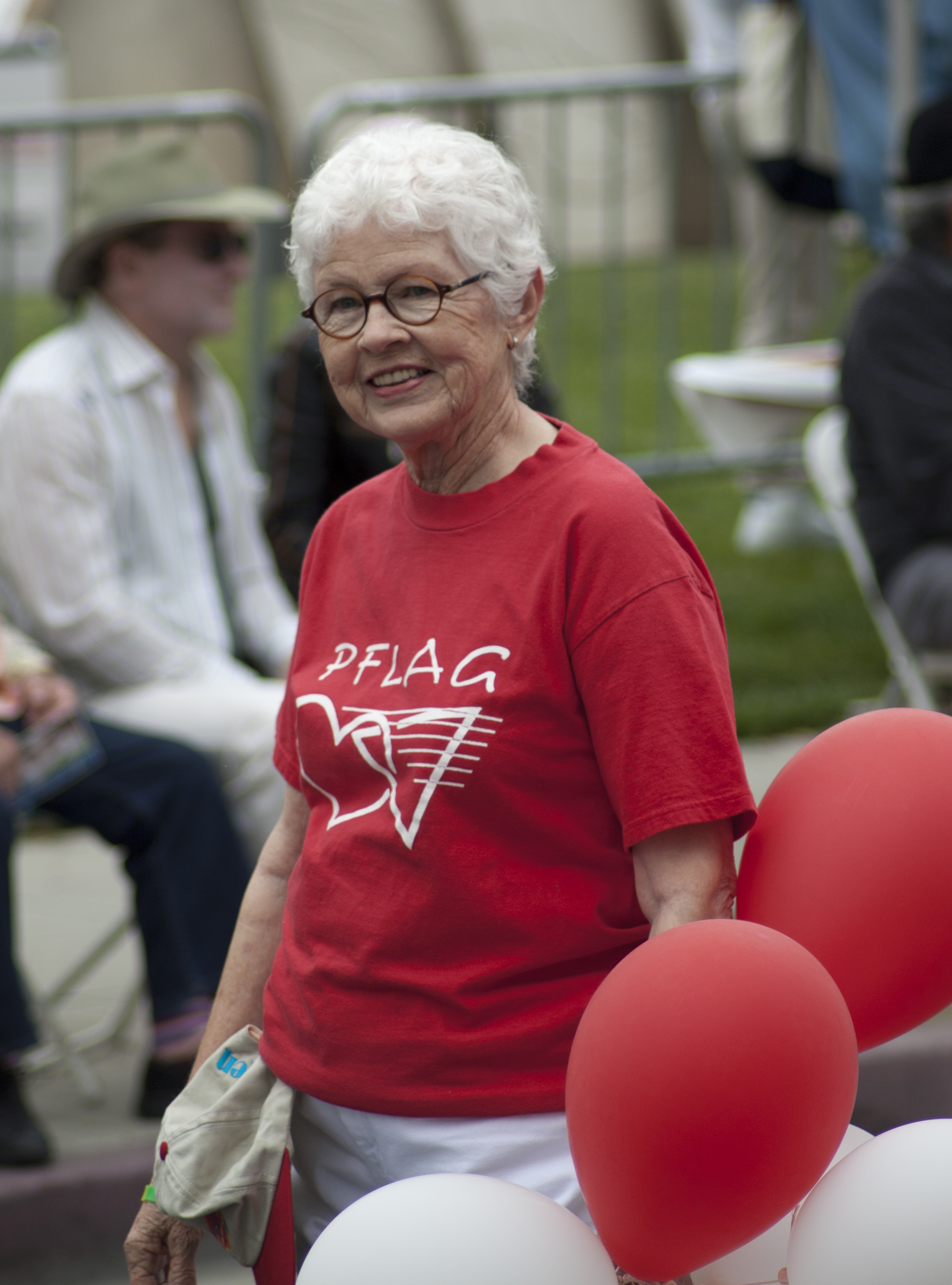
- DeGeneres in 2011
- Born: Betty Jane Pfeffer; May 20, 1930 (age 96); New Orleans, Louisiana, U.S.
- Occupations: Activist; actress
- Years active: 1995–2002 (actress); 1997–present (activist)
- Spouses: Elliott DeGeneres (m. 1952; div. 1974) Roy Gruessendorf (m. 1974; div. 1991)
- Children: Vance DeGeneres; Ellen DeGeneres
- Relatives: Portia de Rossi (daughter-in-law)

Betty Jane DeGeneres (née Pfeffer; born May 20, 1930) is an American LGBT rights activist and former actress. Through her marriage to her first husband Elliott DeGeneres, she is the mother of Ellen and Vance DeGeneres, and the mother-in-law of retired actress Portia de Rossi. She was the first straight spokeswoman for the Human Rights Campaign's National Coming Out Project and an active member of Parents, Families and Friends of Lesbians and Gays (PFLAG). She gained notability following her lesbian daughter Ellen's highly publicized coming out in 1997.

== Life and career ==
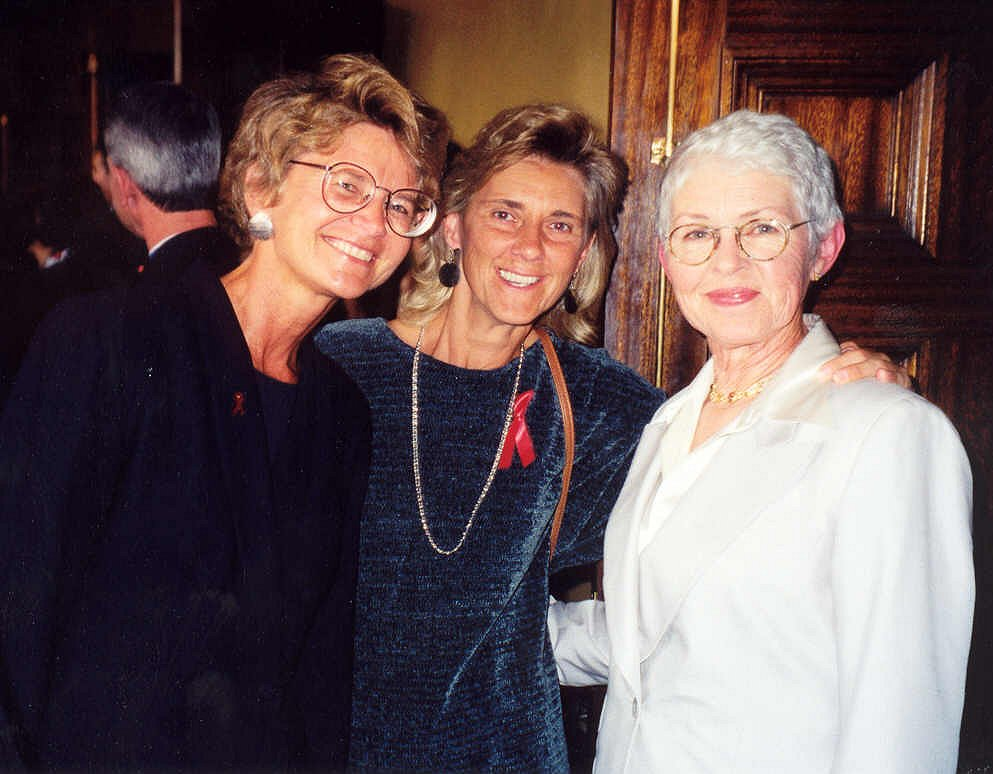
DeGeneres (right) in 1997

The youngest of three daughters, DeGeneres was born in New Orleans, Louisiana, in 1930, during the height of the Great Depression. Her father was German and her mother was Irish. Her sisters (Helen and Audrey) were not involved in day-to-day family life while DeGeneres was in her late teens, but the sisters did become close in adulthood. She attended Louisiana State University (LSU) for two years, studying speech language pathology to become a speech therapist. While in college she performed in a number of plays with Joanne Woodward, who would go on to be an Academy Award-winning actress.

She married Elliott DeGeneres in 1952. The couple divorced in 1974. Shortly afterwards, DeGeneres married Roy Gruessendorf, who moved the family to Texas. DeGeneres was diagnosed with breast cancer shortly after her second marriage. Their marriage ended in the early 1990s; Gruessendorf died in 1997. In 2005, Ellen spoke publicly for the first time about the molestation she had suffered from her stepfather when she was a teenager. DeGeneres returned to LSU after the age of 50 to complete her master's degree in speech pathology.

DeGeneres is the author of two books: Love, Ellen: A Mother Daughter Journey and Just a mother. In Love, Ellen: A Mother Daughter Journey, Betty describes her reaction to her daughter coming out as a lesbian, and her path from passive acceptance to becoming a passionate advocate for LGBTQ rights. She also describes the media scrutiny she received after Ellen came out. Her second book, Just a mother, continues these themes. She also wrote a column for the (now defunct) website PlanetOut called "Ask Betty".

DeGeneres appeared as an extra in the episode "The Puppy Episode" of the television sitcom Ellen, in which her daughter Ellen's character comes out. DeGeneres appears in many episodes of The Ellen DeGeneres Show, sitting in the audience.

DeGeneres survived breast cancer and has discussed this during public appearances.

In her 2024 Netflix special For Your Approval, daughter Ellen said DeGeneres had been diagnosed with dementia.
