= Condition Red (Red Rockers album) =

Studio album by Red Rockers
- Released: 1981
- Studios: The Automatt, San Francisco
- Genres: Punk rock, punk/new wave
- Length: 39:25
- Label: 415
- Producer: David Kahne

Red Rockers chronology
Condition Red (1981)	Good as Gold (1983)

Condition Red is the debut studio album by the American punk rock band Red Rockers, released in 1981 by 415 Records. Produced by David Kahne and recorded at The Automatt in San Francisco, the album established the New Orleans group as a politically minded punk act often compared with the Clash.

== Background and recording ==
Red Rockers recorded Condition Red after relocating from New Orleans to California and signing with 415 Records. The album was produced by David Kahne at the Automatt in San Francisco. In a 1984 interview with The Gavin Report, bassist Darren Hill said that Condition Red had been recorded "in about two days", contrasting it with the more elaborate production schedule for the band's later albums.

Musically, the album combines fast, guitar-driven punk with political lyrics. Under the Radar later wrote that the record's sound and subject matter established Red Rockers as an American counterpart to the Clash. The album includes a cover of Johnny Cash's "Folsom Prison Blues", with backing vocals by Jello Biafra.

== Critical reception ==
In its original review, Billboard recommended the album and wrote that Red Rockers kept the spirit of rebellion alive through songs such as "Guns of Revolution", "Dead Heroes", and "White Law". Cash Box described the band as a more frantic and hard-rocking act than many of the other groups on the 415 roster.

Retrospective assessments have been more mixed. Ira Robbins of Trouser Press wrote that the album matched early Clash records in political conviction, while arguing that it could sound more preachy than passionate. Writing in The Washington Post in 1984, Richard Harrington characterized Condition Red as "leftist punk in the Clash vein" when contrasting it with the band's later, more melodic work.

== 2023 reissue ==
In 2023, Sundazed and Liberty Spike reissued Condition Red on vinyl, CD, and digital formats. The reissue added bonus tracks drawn from B-sides, compilations, and previously unreleased material. Under the Radar noted that it was the first vinyl reissue of the album since its original 1981 release.

== Track listing ==
All tracks are written by Red Rockers, except where noted.

1. "Guns of Revolution" – 1:51
2. "Teenage Underground" – 2:16
3. "Peer Pressure" – 1:54
4. "Can You Hear" – 3:10
5. "Grow Up" – 1:26
6. "Know What I Think" – 2:21
7. "Dead Heroes" – 3:13
8. "Folsom Prison Blues" (Johnny Cash) – 2:02
9. "Condition Red" – 1:56
10. "Hold On" – 2:12
11. "White Law" – 2:34
12. "Live or Die" – 3:03

Professional ratings
Review scores
Source	Rating
Robert Christgau	B−
