= Mercyland (album) =

Studio album by Cowboy Mouth
- Released: September 22, 1998
- Genre: Rock
- Length: 47:47
- Label: MCA
- Producer: Michael Barbiero

Cowboy Mouth chronology
Word of Mouth (Remix) (1996)	Mercyland (1998)	Easy (2000)

Professional ratings
Review scores
Source	Rating
Allmusic	3/5 stars
The Standard	0/0 stars

Mercyland is the fourth studio album by American rock band Cowboy Mouth. It was their second album on the (MCA) label. It produced the single "Whatcha Gonna Do?", which also charted on the Billboard charts.

== Track listing ==
1. "Why Ya Wanna Do Me?" 2:36
2. "Lovers Or Friends" 3:52
3. "Little Blue One" 2:40
4. "Drummer Man" 4:11
5. "Turn Me On" 3:57
6. "Whatcha Gonna Do?" 3:12
7. "Only One Of Us" 3:04
8. "Everyone Is Waiting" 3:10
9. "Great Wide Open World" 3:35
10. "I Want To Believe" 4:12
11. "Shotgun In My Soul" 3:00
12. "Crazy 'Bout Ya" 2:57
13. "Out Of My Way Back To You" 3:34
14. "Bad" 3:47
