= New Orleans Music in Exile =

New Orleans Music in Exile is a documentary and music film that was made in 2006 and released on DVD on August 7, 2007. It was directed by Robert Mugge.

== Summary ==
Essentially, this film tells the story of several New Orleans–based musicians during and following the events caused by Hurricane Katrina. Mixed in with the stories and interviews, which include: some losing their homes, some relocating, many losing their musical instruments and jobs at local establishments, are songs by the artists. Many of the songs written shortly following the hurricane. While many of the musicians ended up relocating to places like Austin, Memphis or New York, all have a desire to see New Orleans come back.

The theme of the film is that Katrina will not be allowed to destroy the musical and cultural heritage of New Orleans.

== Notable acts in the film ==
- Dr. John
- Irma Thomas
- Cyril Neville
- Kermit Ruffins
- Marcia Ball
- Eddie Bo
- Cowboy Mouth
- Theresa Andersson
- The Iguanas

== DVD extras ==
- A history of New Orleans piano by British transplant Jon Cleary.
- A segment on a rescue mission by Dave Spizale, the general manager of KRVS of Lafayette, Louisiana.
