= Live in the X Lounge =

Series of compilation albums

Live in the X Lounge (I-VII)

Live album by Various Artists
- Released: 1998-2004
- Genre: Alternative rock
- Label: Multiple
- Producer: Joel Bouchillon

Live in the X Lounge is a series of albums released by Birmingham, Alabama's former alternative rock radio station, WRAX.

Though the station can no longer be found on the air, this series of live performances was produced while the station was known as 107.7 The X. The station was later renamed and moved to The X @ 100.5, a change prompted by its acquisition by Citadel Broadcasting. Seven albums were produced in all, the last one released in 2004, just a few months before the station was acquired. All discs in the series were sold to benefit United Cerebral Palsy of Greater Birmingham, a group of associations raising money to create awareness and research for cerebral palsy.

The first CD in this series was released in 1998, selling out all 10,000 copies in 10 days. According to Dave Rossi, a former program director of WRAX 107.7 The X, this made the X Lounge the fastest selling CD in Birmingham history, raising just over $135,000. Each release produced several hundred thousand dollars for the organization, with just over $500,000 raised as of the third disc's release date. By the time the seventh disc in the series was released, over 85,000 copies were sold, with the contributions of over 70 bands, raising $1.3 million for UCP of Greater Birmingham. Plans to release an eighth disc were canceled by program director Ken Wall.

All of the Live In the X Lounge CDs were recorded live at Airwave Recording Studio, Homewood, Al. Executive Producer Conrad Rafield, lll. Music Produced and Engineered by Joel Bouchillon.

== Albums ==
=== Live in the X Lounge (1998) ===
1. Sister Hazel - "All For You"
2. Black Lab - "Wash It Away"
3. Fuel - "Shimmer"
4. Edwin McCain - "Solitude"
5. Patty Griffin - "Tony"
6. Semisonic - "Closing Time"
7. Tonic - "Open Up Your Eyes"
8. Creed - "My Own Prison"
9. Guster - "Demons"
10. Fastball - "Out Of My Head"
11. Better Than Ezra - "At The Stars"
12. Jump, Little Children - "15 Stories"
13. Brother Cane - "Lead My Follow"
14. Cowboy Mouth - "Jenny Says"
15. Barenaked Ladies - "Be My Yoko Ono"
16. Matchbox Twenty - "3 AM"

=== Live in the X Lounge II (1999) ===
1. BR5-49 - "Out of Habit"
2. Train - "Ramble On"
3. Hootie & the Blowfish - "Hold My Hand"
4. Shawn Mullins - "Lullaby"
5. Edwin McCain - "I'll Be"
6. Alanis Morissette - "Are You Still Mad"
7. The Black Crowes - "Remedy"
8. Vertical Horizon - "Everything You Want"
9. My Friend Steve - "All in All"
10. Fuel - "Sunburn"
11. Train - "Ramble On" (Select Discs due to copyright issues)
12. Mr Henry - "One"
13. Hootie & the Blowfish - "Desert Mountain Showdown"
14. Widespread Panic - "Blue Indian"

=== Live in the X Lounge III (2000) ===
1. 3 Doors Down - "Loser"
2. Splender - "Yeah Whatever"
3. Peter Searcy - "Invent"
4. Sister Hazel - "Champagne High"
5. Incubus - "Pardon Me"
6. Better Than Ezra - "Wallflower Girl"
7. Guster - "Happier"
8. Third Eye Blind - "1000 Julys"
9. Vertical Horizon - "You're a God"
10. Pat McGee Band - "Shine"
11. Stir - "Climbing The Walls"
12. Nine Days - "Absolutely"
13. Cowboy Mouth - "Easy"
14. Gas Giants - "Quitter"
15. Matthew Sweet - "I've Been Waiting"

=== Live in the X Lounge IV (2001) ===
1. Live - "I Alone"
2. Lifehouse - "Hanging By A Moment"
3. John Mayer - "Your Body is a Wonderland"
4. Tonic - "Mean To Me"
5. Train - "Drops Of Jupiter"
6. Seven Mary Three - "Cumbersome"
7. 3 Doors Down - "Be Like That"
8. Athenaeum - "Comfort"
9. Dexter Freebish - "My Madonna"
10. Five for Fighting - "Superman"
11. The Calling - "Wherever You Will Go"
12. Cowboy Mouth - "Jenny Says"
13. Will Hoge - "Let Me Be Lonely"

=== Live in the X Lounge V (2002) ===
1. John Mayer - "No Such Thing"
2. Better Than Ezra - "Misunderstood"
3. Tantric - "Mourning"
4. Custom - "Beat Me"
5. Ben Folds - "Still Fighting It"
6. Hoobastank - "Running Away"
7. Glen Phillips - "All I Want"
8. Remy Zero - "Save Me"
9. Widespread Panic - "Climb To Safety"
10. Nickelback - "How You Remind Me"

=== Live in the X Lounge VI (2003) ===
1. Coldplay - "Yellow"
2. Maroon 5 - "Harder To Breathe"
3. Seether - "Broken"
4. Switchfoot - "Dare You To Move"
5. R.E.M. - "Losing My Religion"
6. Saliva - "Always"
7. Jason Mraz - "Curbside Prophet"
8. Sister Hazel- "Your Mistake"
9. SouthFM - "Dear Claudia"
10. Pete Yorn - "For Nancy"
11. Eve 6 - "Inside Out"

=== Live in the X Lounge VII (2004) ===
1. Michael Tolcher - "Mission Responsible"
2. Finger Eleven - "One Thing"
3. Switchfoot - "Meant To Live"
4. Marc Broussard - "Rock Steady"
5. The Rising - "Cradle"
6. Graham Colton Band - "Killing Me"
7. Coldplay – "2000 Miles"
8. Dexter Freebish - "Twilight"
9. Seether - "Fine Again"
10. Maroon 5 - "This Love"
11. Incubus - "Talk Show On Mute"
