= Cowboy Mouth =

American band

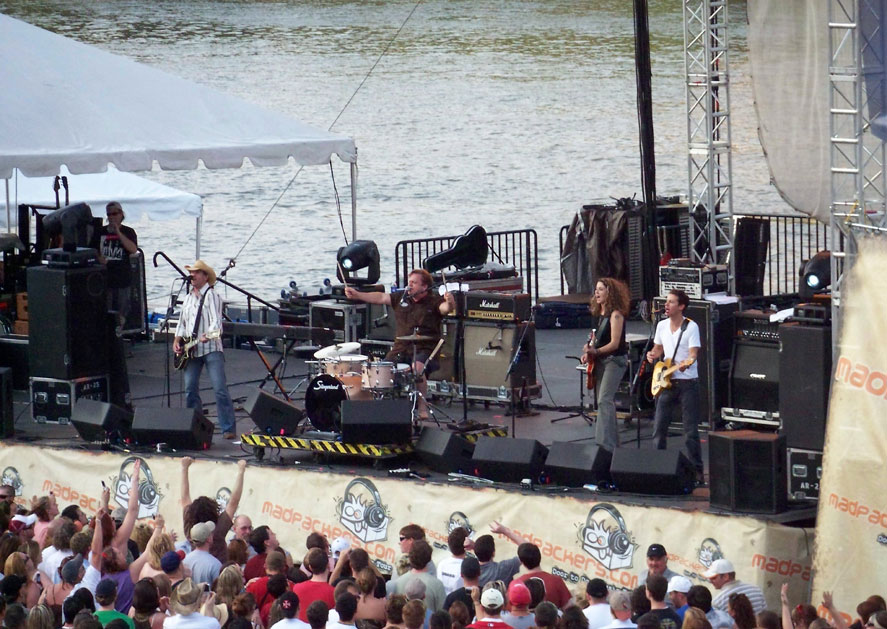
- Cowboy Mouth performing in Nashville, Tennessee

Background information
- Origin: New Orleans, Louisiana, United States
- Genres: Alternative rock; album-oriented rock; roots rock; jam band
- Years active: 1990–present
- Labels: Eleven Thirty, MCA, Blackbird, Atlantic, Valley Entertainment
- Members: Fred LeBlanc; John Thomas Griffith; Brian Broussard; Frank Grocholski
- Past members: Paul Sanchez; Regina Zernay; Sonia Tetlow; Paul Clement; Steve Walters; Rob Savoy; Mary LaSang; Vance DeGeneres; Jonathan Pretus; Casandra Faulconer; Matt Jones
- Website: www.cowboymouth.com

Cowboy Mouth is an American band based in New Orleans, Louisiana known for fusing alternative rock with album-oriented rock, roots rock, and jam band influences. Formed in 1992, the band saw early mainstream success in the 1990s, including the hit single "Jenny Says". After disappointing album sales in 2000, they were dropped by their label, but the band has succeeded since then by focusing on live performances and independent-label releases. In 2011, the band was inducted into the Louisiana Music Hall of Fame.

== History ==
The term "cowboy mouth" — taken from an early play by Sam Shepard and Patti Smith — usually means "one with a loud and raucous voice". This phrase was likely taken from the Bob Dylan song "Sad Eyed Lady of the Lowlands" from his record Blonde on Blonde. The nucleus of the band formed in the 1990s, and they have become a powerhouse live act whose performances have been likened to "a religious experience".

After initially releasing independent albums, in 1996 Cowboy Mouth signed with MCA Records, who released Are You with Me?. "Jenny Says", an existing song that the band re-recorded on Are You With Me?, was released as a single. "Jenny Says" reached #26 on the Billboard Mainstream Rock chart and #33 on the Billboard Alternative Rock chart, making it the band's biggest hit. The band released additional records, but their label dropped them after 2000's Easy failed to meet their label's sales expectations. Undeterred by the lack of a major label, the band continued producing albums and releasing them through independent labels through the 2000s and to the present day.

Some of their most popular songs include "Love Of My Life", "Everybody Loves Jill" (where the audience throws red spoons on stage), "Easy," "Disconnected", "How Do You Tell Someone", and "Jenny Says". They also perform a version of "Born to Run" on the Light of Day tribute album to Bruce Springsteen, a version of "The Pusher" on the soundtrack to Half Baked, and several of their own songs on the soundtrack to the 1995 film The Underneath (two of which they perform onscreen in the film). Their single "This Much Fun" from their 2006 album Voodoo Shoppe is featured in the trailer for the Disney animated feature Meet the Robinsons.

They maintain a very active touring schedule, primarily through the United States. The album Voodoo Shoppe is in part a tribute to city of New Orleans, Louisiana in the wake of the devastation of Hurricane Katrina — in particular, the tracks "Home," a defiant vow to rebuild the city, and "The Avenue", an emotional plea for the continued vibrance of the city. "The Avenue" features the lyrics "Because the marching bands will roll/I'll find my city in my soul/Because I plan on growing old on the avenue," a reference to watching Mardi Gras parades on New Orleans' famed St. Charles Avenue. A portion of the album was recorded with producer Mitch Allan and features engineers Stewart Cararas and Danny Kadar at their studio Paradigm Park Studios in New Orleans. Seven months after the record's completion, the studio suffered the wrath of Hurricane Katrina. They performed "The Avenue" on Mardi Gras Day 2006 live on The Ellen DeGeneres Show. The album also features the song "Joe Strummer", a semi-tribute to the late Clash frontman. The band released its first full-length live DVD, The Name of the Band Is Cowboy Mouth, on November 20, 2007. The DVD, which was recorded in front of a packed house at the Roxy On Sunset in Hollywood, CA during the summer of 2007, features much of the band's classic material like "Light it on Fire" as well as some songs to be released on the band's new album, Fearless, in September 2008. Among the new songs of the DVD set, "Kelly Ripa" was released in a very different studio version as a single on iTunes in early March 2008 followed by an appearance and performance on the Live with Regis and Kelly television show on March 13, 2008.

On May 14, 2011, during a performance at Bon Ton Louisianne in Houston, Texas, Cowboy Mouth was inducted into The Louisiana Music Hall Of Fame.

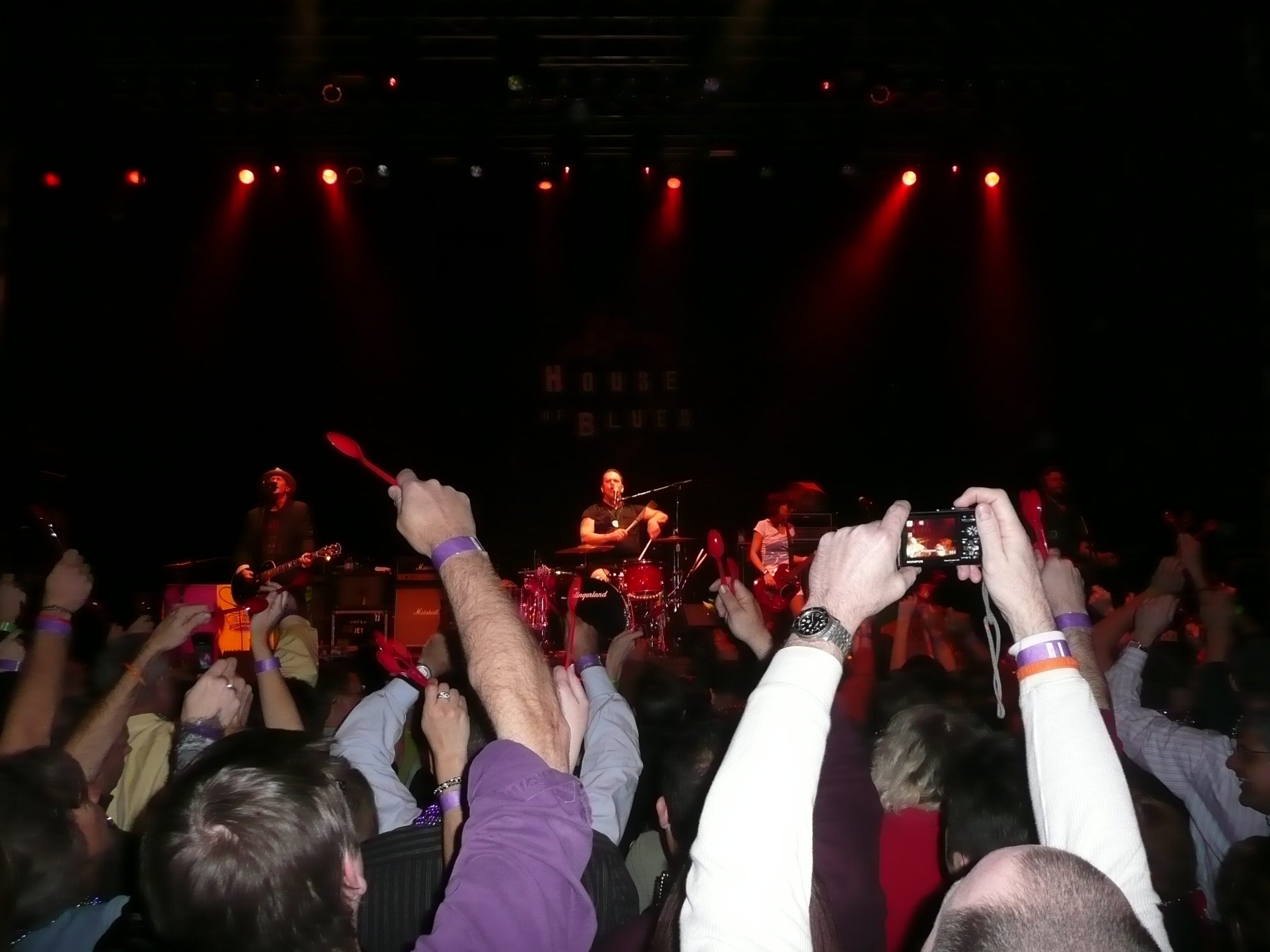
Cowboy Mouth performing "Everybody Loves Jill" on Mardi Gras night in Houston, 2010, with fans waving red spoons in anticipation of their cue to throw them at the band.

== Band members ==
=== Current members ===
- Fred LeBlanc (lead vocals, drums, and frontman)

Founding member. Formerly of the Backbeats and the New Orleans power trio Dash Rip Rock.

- John Thomas Griffith (guitar and vocals)

Founding member. Formerly of the Red Rockers, purveyors of the 1980s "China" and "Good As Gold" as well as subsequent tourmates with U2, the Go-Go's, and Men at Work.

- Brian "Bruiser" Broussard (bass)

Formerly of the New Orleans power trio Dash Rip Rock, New Orleans hard rock band Supagroup and Louisiana country rock band Christian Serpas & Ghost Town. Brian is also the master brewer at Bayou Teche Brewery in Arnaudville, Louisiana.

- Frank "Frankie G" Grocholski (rhythm guitar and vocals)

=== Former members ===
- Matt Jones (rhythm guitar and vocals) (2010–2021)

Currently with Jimmie's Chicken Shack

- Casandra Faulconer – seventh bass player and vocals (2010–2014)

Currently with the all-girl house band for Cirque du Soleil’s touring show, Amaluna
Formerly toured with Debbie Davies and Papa Mali

- Regina Zernay, sixth bass player, and vocals (2007–2010)

Formerly the singer/bassist for Los Angeles band Méchant.

- Jonathan Pretus, rhythm guitar, vocals (2007–2010) the third guitarist the band has had.

Currently with The Breton Sound.
Formerly the singer/guitarist for New Orleans–based band The Garden District.
Former singer/guitarist for Weezer cover band Tweezer.

- Sonia Tetlow – fifth bass player and vocals (left in 2007)

- Paul Sanchez – founding member-guitar and vocals (left in 2006)

Formerly of New Orleans band The Backbeats.

- Paul Clement, bass guitar, first bass player, and original member

With the band for six months prior to Walters, and has played with many New Orleans–area bands including Woodenhead.

- Steve Walters – bass guitar (second bass player)

Formerly of The Backbeats and The Normals.

- Rob Savoy – bass guitar (third bass player)

Past member of Louisiana Cajun rock group The Bluerunners.

- Mary LaSang – bass guitar (fourth bass player)

Of Dingo 8 fame.

- Vance DeGeneres (guitar) 2nd guitarist

Credits include New Orleans band The Cold and The Backbeats, television writer and producer, former correspondent of The Daily Show, and brother of Ellen DeGeneres. DeGeneres played with Cowboy Mouth from December 2006 through September 2007, when he left to pursue additional television projects.

== Discography ==
=== Studio albums ===
- Word of Mouth • 1992
- It Means Escape • 1994
- Are You with Me? • 1996
- Word of Mouth (Remix) • 1996
- Mercyland • 1998
- Easy • 2000
- Uh-Oh • 2003
- Voodoo Shoppe • 2006
- Fearless • 2008
- This Train... • 2012
- Go! • 2014
- The Name Of The Band Is... • 2016
- The Name Of The Band Is, Volume 2 • 2018

Although both The Name Of The Band Is... albums are subtitled "The Best Of (So Far!)" they are not compilation albums. Both are a combination of previously unreleased material and existing material re-recorded by the band's 2016–2018 lineup.

=== Live albums and EPs ===
- Mouthin' Off (Live & More) • 1993
- Mouthin' Off (Live & More) (Remastered) • 1997
- Cowboy Mouth Live! (limited edition 5-song EP issued with Mercyland) • 1998
- Live in the X Lounge "Jenny Says" • 1998 & 2001
- All You Need Is Live • 2000
- Live in the X Lounge "Easy" • 2000
- Uh Oh (5-song preview EP) • 2003
- Live at the Zoo • 2004
- Mardi Gras • 2010
- Open Wide (6-song EP) • 2020

=== Singles ===
- "I Believe (A Tribute To The Saints)" • 2009
- "Jenny Says"
- "Whatcha Gonna Do?"

=== Filmography ===
- Underneath • 1995
- New Orleans Music in Exile • 2006
- The Name of the Band Is Cowboy Mouth • 2007
