= The Normals (New Orleans band) =

The Normals were an American 1970s punk band from New Orleans, Louisiana, United States.
