= Vance DeGeneres =

American actor, musician, film producer and screenwriter (born 1954)

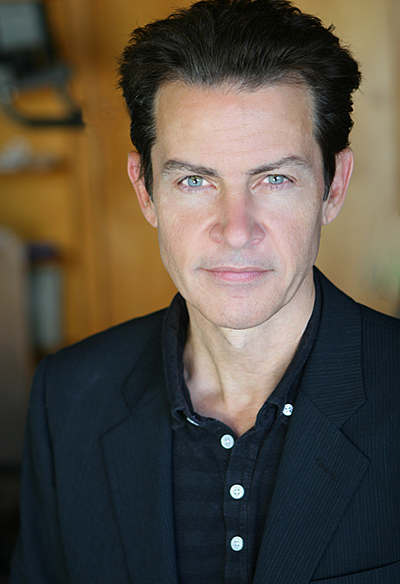
- DeGeneres in 2008
- Born: Vance Elliott DeGeneres; September 2, 1954 (age 72); New Orleans, Louisiana, U.S.
- Occupations: Actor; comedian; musician; film producer; screenwriter
- Years active: 1979–present
- Spouses: Mimi DeGeneres (m. 1990; div. 1991) Joanna Brooks (m. 2013)
- Mother: Betty DeGeneres
- Relatives: Ellen DeGeneres (sister); Portia de Rossi (sister-in-law)

Vance Elliott DeGeneres (born September 2, 1954) is an American actor, comedian, musician, film producer and screenwriter, known for his work in television and movies.

== Early life ==
DeGeneres was born at Touro Infirmary in New Orleans, Louisiana to Betty and Elliott DeGeneres. He is the older brother of comedian Ellen DeGeneres.

== Career ==
After a two-year period in the Marine Corps, during which he reached the rank of corporal, DeGeneres hosted a radio program called New Wave New Orleans in the late 1970s, broadcast on WQUE-FM.

He played bass guitar and was a songwriter in the band The Cold, a new-wave band founded in New Orleans in the late 1970s. The Cold was inaugurated into the Louisiana Music Hall of Fame in 2018.

He was the original "Mr. Hands" of "The Mr. Bill Show."

In 1991, DeGeneres was a staff writer on Eerie, Indiana, on NBC. In 1993, DeGeneres co-created, with Karl Schaefer, a pilot script for ABC called Lost Angels, he wrote an episode for Diagnosis Murder. In 1994–95, DeGeneres wrote and produced 9 Line. In 1995, he and Emily Cutler co-created and co-hosted Movies Schmoovies, a movie review pilot.

In 1995, DeGeneres and Alex Herschlag co-created and co-hosted a comedy show called The 4th Floor Show, a mock talk show. The pilot episode aired on E! In 1996–97, DeGeneres was a writer on Ellen. In 1998, DeGeneres was a writer on the UPN sitcom Hits.

DeGeneres has been a writer on The Academy Awards, The Emmy Awards, and The Grammy Awards.

In the mid-1980s, DeGeneres co-founded the rock band House of Schock with The Go-Go's drummer Gina Schock on Capitol Records.

In 1998, he played keyboards and guitar for the New Orleans–based band Cowboy Mouth. In March 2006, he appeared on The Ellen DeGeneres Show with Cowboy Mouth to perform their song "The Avenue".

DeGeneres was a correspondent on The Daily Show with Jon Stewart from 1999 to 2001.

In 2002, he co-created, with Andy Lassner at Fox, a comedy pilot called Your Local News. DeGeneres also hosted.

DeGeneres was co-president of Carousel Productions at Warner Bros. for six years, Steve Carell's production company, developing comedy movies, including Crazy Stupid Love and The Incredible Burt Wonderstone. He was an executive producer on both films.

DeGeneres was an executive producer on the Showtime series Inside Comedy, hosted by David Steinberg, for four seasons.

He currently has a television development deal at Telepictures Productions, a division of Warner Bros.

During the coronavirus pandemic of 2020, DeGeneres and Rick Springfield created the online series, Rick Springfield & Vance DeGeneres Present the Miniseries: the 60 Second Guide to Songwriting with a Partner. The comedic series resulted in two songs: "The Wall Will Fall" and "Welcome to Your Bright New World", with proceeds benefitting Feeding America.

He was an executive producer on Ellen's Game of Games, which aired on NBC in 2020.

== Personal life ==
DeGeneres married his wife Joanna in 2013 in a small ceremony at the Ojai Valley Inn & Spa. Ellen DeGeneres, Portia de Rossi, and actor Steve Carell were among the guests.

In 2020, he publicly defended his sister over allegations she fostered a "toxic workplace environment".
