= 2013 in American music =

The following is a list of notable events and releases that happened in 2013 in music in the United States.

== Notable events ==
=== January ===
- 8 – American alternative rock duo Twenty One Pilots released their third and major-label debut album Vessel after signing with Fueled by Ramen.
- 9 – Original Three Days Grace lead singer Adam Gontier leaves the band, citing health concerns
- 10 – Six and a half years after releasing FutureSex/LoveSounds, Justin Timberlake announces his return to music with a new album titled The 20/20 Experience, and a summer tour with Jay-Z.

=== February ===
- 3 – Alicia Keys performed the National Anthem and Beyoncé performed during the halftime show at Super Bowl XLVII.
- 4 – Fall Out Boy announced their reformation with a new album and concert tour.
- 10 – The 55th Annual Grammy Awards took place at the Staples Center in Los Angeles, hosted by LL Cool J. Dan Auerbach wins the most awards of the night with five. Mumford and Sons win Album of the Year with Babel, while Gotye's "Somebody That I Used to Know", featuring Kimbra, wins Record of the Year.
- 17 – Country singer Mindy McCready commits suicide at the age of 37
- 27 – Stone Temple Pilots fire their lead singer, Scott Weiland

=== March ===
- 15 – Justin Timberlake's album, The 20/20 Experience, was released selling 968,000 copies in its first week. It became the best-selling album of the year in the U.S.
- 22 – My Chemical Romance break up after twelve years together. They end up reuniting six years later.

=== April ===
- 2 – Bon Jovi member Richie Sambora announced his departure from the band just hours before a concert date scheduled in Calgary, Alberta.
  - New Kids on the Block released their first album in five years, 10.
- 7 – The Academy of Country Music Awards took place at the MGM Grand Garden Arena in Las Vegas.
- 12 – Fall Out Boy released their first album in nearly five years, Save Rock and Roll.
- 14 – Founding Deftones bassist Chi Cheng passes away at age 42 after spending more than 4 years in a coma as a result of a 2008 car accident
- 21 – Divinyls singer Chrissy Amphlett dies from breast cancer at the age of 53.

=== May ===
- 2 – Slayer guitarist Jeff Hanneman dies from cirrhosis of the liver at age 49.
- 16 – Candice Glover is crowned winner of American Idol (season 12) while Kree Harrison is named runner-up.
- 18 – Chester Bennington of Linkin Park fame plays his first show as the singer for Stone Temple Pilots; also STP's first concert since original singer Scott Weiland was terminated
- 19 – The Billboard Music Awards took place at the MGM Grand Garden Arena in Las Vegas. Taylor Swift took home the most awards of the night with eight including Top Artist.
- 20 – The Doors keyboardist Ray Manzarek dies in Germany from bile duct cancer at age 74.
- 21 – Thirty Seconds to Mars released their first studio album in nearly four years, Love, Lust, Faith and Dreams.

=== June ===
- 18 – Cher makes a historic return after eleven years of absence with "Woman's World", the lead single off her twenty-fifth studio album, Closer to the Truth, which is released three months later.
  - Danielle Bradbery wins the fourth season of The Voice. Michelle Chamuel is named runner-up. The Swon Brothers finishing third place.
- 25 – Stone Gossard released his first solo album in twelve years, Moonlander.

=== July ===
- 4 – Jay Z released his first solo studio album in four years, Magna Carta Holy Grail, which sold over 550,000 copies in its first week.
- 30 – The Backstreet Boys released their first studio album in four years, In a World Like This. This is their first album with Kevin Richardson since Never Gone (2005).

=== August ===
- 25 – The 2013 MTV Video Music Awards were held at the Barclays Center in Brooklyn. Justin Timberlake was awarded the Michael Jackson Video Vanguard Award, also performing a 15-minutes medley including a reunion with NSYNC, the first time in nine years. Miley Cyrus creates controversy by twerking at Robin Thicke's crotch area, during a performance.
  - Katy Perry released her lead single "Roar" for her fourth studio album, Prism. The song reached number 1 and sold 9.9 million copies around the world.
- 30 – Nine Inch Nails released their first studio album in five years, Hesitation Marks.

=== September ===
- 20 – Cher released her first studio album in twelve years, Closer to the Truth, debuting at number three on the Billboard 200 (making it Cher's first highest-peaking solo album on the chart).

=== October ===
- 8 – Stone Temple Pilots released their High Rise EP, their only release to feature Linkin Park singer Chester Bennington on lead vocals.
- 27 – Lou Reed, founding member of The Velvet Underground, dies in Southampton, New York, from liver disease at age 71.
- 29 – The teen pop rock band Jonas Brothers announced an indefinite hiatus following many disagreements. They announced a return in 2019.

=== November ===
- 5 – Eminem's album, The Marshall Mathers LP 2, was released selling 792,000 copies in its first week, and was the second-best-selling album of the year in the U.S.
- 6 – The CMA Awards took place at the Bridgestone Arena in Nashville, Tennessee.
- 19 – Reggie and the Full Effect released their first album in five years, No Country for Old Musicians.
- 24 – The American Music Awards took place at the Nokia Theatre L.A. Live.

=== December ===
- 3 – Boston released their first studio album in eleven years, Life, Love & Hope. Some songs on the album posthumously feature the vocals of the band's original frontman, Brad Delp, who died in 2007.
- 13 – Beyoncé released her surprise fifth studio album, Beyoncé, a 'visual album' containing 14 songs and an accompanying music video for each song. The album debuts at #1 based on 3 days of digital sales, making Beyoncé the first female artist, and second artist overall to debut at the top spot with her first five studio efforts.
- 17 – Tessanne Chin wins the fifth season of The Voice. Jacquie Lee is named runner-up. Will Champlin finishing third place.

== Bands formed ==
- Beach Slang
- Beverly
- Big Data
- Bully
- Cannons
- Childbirth
- Dead Poet Society
- The Empty Hearts
- Fame on Fire
- Fight or Flight
- G.R.L.
- Heart Attack Man
- I Prevail
- Julian Casablancas+The Voidz
- Marian Hill
- Nathaniel Rateliff & the Night Sweats
- Rae Sremmurd
- Rainbow Kitten Surprise
- Run the Jewels
- Spanish Love Songs
- Starbomb
- Sylvan Esso

== Bands reformed ==
- Black Flag
- The Calling
- Danity Kane
- Failure
- The Fall of Troy
- Fall Out Boy
- Girls Against Boys
- Medicine
- Neutral Milk Hotel
- Nine Inch Nails
- The Postal Service
- Rocket from the Crypt
- Story of the Year
- TLC

== Bands on hiatus ==
- Ben Folds Five
- Evanescence
- Fleet Foxes
- Ghostland Observatory
- Just Surrender
- Lifehouse
- The Walkmen

== Bands disbanded ==
- A Life Once Lost
- A Tribe Called Quest
- Allstar Weekend
- Asobi Seksu
- Attack Attack!
- The Calling
- The Chariot
- Churchill
- The Click Five
- Comadre
- Dr. Acula
- E for Explosion
- Friends
- Gifts From Enola
- Go Radio
- God Forbid
- Honor Society
- Jonas Brothers
- Kid Dynamite
- Klymaxx
- Madina Lake
- The Mars Volta
- My Chemical Romance
- New Boyz
- The Postal Service
- A Rocket to the Moon
- Static-X
- Sunny Day Real Estate
- Supercute!
- Underoath
- Wild Flag
- Woe, Is Me

== Albums released ==
=== January ===
Day	Title	Artist	Genre(s)
8	Wretched and Divine: The Story of the Wild Ones	Black Veil Brides	Glam metal; heavy metal; punk rock
8	Signed and Sealed in Blood	Dropkick Murphys	Celtic punk
8	Vessel	Twenty One Pilots	Alternative rock; alternative hip hop; rock; indie rock; hip hop
15	Long. Live. ASAP	ASAP Rocky	Hip hop
15	Fall Into Me	Katie Armiger	Country
15	Kidz Bop 23	Kidz Bop Kids	Children's; pop
15	Beautiful	Teena Marie	R&B
15	Goldenheart	Dawn Richard	R&B; pop; dance
22	Set You Free	Gary Allan	Country rock
22	True North	Bad Religion	Melodic hardcore; punk rock
22	The Acoustic Sessions: Volume One	Casting Crowns	Acoustic; worship
22	Just Movement	Robert DeLong	Electronic
22	FIDLAR	FIDLAR	Garage punk; garage rock
22	How Country Feels	Randy Houser	Country
22	Tim McGraw & Friends	Tim McGraw	Country
22	My True Story	Aaron Neville	R&B
22	Beta Love	Ra Ra Riot	Indie rock; indie pop; electronica; synthpop
22	True Believers	Darius Rucker	Country
22	Reborn	Trapt	Alternative rock; post-grunge; hard rock; alternative metal
22	Vulnerable (II)	The Used	Alternative rock
29	Love Songs	Destiny's Child	R&B
29	A Messenger	Colton Dixon	Christian; alternative rock
29	Hummingbird	Local Natives	Indie rock
29	No Fairy Tale	Lisa Loeb	
29	Give In	On An On	Indie rock; dream pop
29	Sentimental Journey	Emmy Rossum	Traditional pop; vocal
29	Love, Charlie	Charlie Wilson	R&B

=== February ===
Date	Title	Artist	Genre(s)
5	The Afterman: Descension	Coheed and Cambria	Progressive rock
5	All That Echoes	Josh Groban	Operatic pop; classical
5	In Guards We Trust	Guards	Indie rock; power pop
5	Greatest Hits	Jewel	Folk-pop; pop; dance-pop; country; country pop
5	Two Lanes of Freedom	Tim McGraw	Country
5	Conventional Weapons	My Chemical Romance	Punk rock; alternative rock
5	Release the Panic	Red	Alternative metal
5	Now 45	Various artists	Pop
12	Eyrth, Wynd & Fyre	Cappadonna	Hip hop
12	Barmageddon	Ras Kass	Hip hop
17	Splitting Branches	Tree	Experimental rock; indie rock
19	Czarface	Czarface	Hip hop
19	The Dixie Dead	Wednesday 13	Horror punk
26	Amok	Atoms for Peace	Experimental rock; electronica
26	Black Gold	Kutt Calhoun	Hip hop
26	Need You Now	Plumb	Modern rock; alternative rock

=== March ===
Date	Title	Artist	Genre(s)
5	Spring Break...Here to Party	Luke Bryan	Country
5	This... Is Marcus Canty	Marcus Canty	R&B
5	Waking Up Is Hard to Do	Giant Drag	Indie rock; alternative rock
5	People, Hell & Angels	Jimi Hendrix	Blues rock; psychedelic rock; hard rock; acid rock; funk rock
5	Welcome Oblivion	How to Destroy Angels	Post-industrial; electronica
5	Nanobots	They Might Be Giants	Alternative; experimental
5	Like a Rose	Ashley Monroe	Country
5	The Beast in Its Tracks	Josh Ritter	Folk
5	Honky Tonk	Son Volt	Alternative country
12	Kings & Queens	Audio Adrenaline	Contemporary Christian; Christian alternative; Christian rock
12	What About Now	Bon Jovi	Rock
12	It Happens All the Time	Megan Hilty	Pop
12	All Around the World	Mindless Behavior	R&B; pop
14	Trunk Muzik Returns	Yelawolf	Hip hop
15	Earth Rocker	Clutch	Stoner rock; blues rock
19	Specter at the Feast	Black Rebel Motorcycle Club	Alternative rock; garage rock; blues rock
19	Same Trailer Different Park	Kacey Musgraves	Country
19	The RZA Presents Shaolin Soul Selection: Volume 1	Various Artists	R&B; soul
19	The 20/20 Experience	Justin Timberlake	Pop; R&B
26	No Matter How Far	David Archuleta	Pop
26	All That for This	Crystal Bowersox	Folk rock
26	Collider	Cartel	Pop rock; pop punk
26	Girl Who Got Away	Dido	Pop
26	I Am Not a Human Being II	Lil Wayne	Hip hop
26	Native	OneRepublic	Pop rock; alternative rock
26	The Nacirema Dream	Papoose	East Coast hip hop
26	Wild & Free	A Rocket to the Moon	Alternative rock; pop rock; indie rock; pop punk
26	Black Out the Sun	Sevendust	Heavy metal; alternative metal
26	Based on a True Story...	Blake Shelton	Country
26	What You Don't See	The Story So Far	Pop punk
26	Comedown Machine	The Strokes	Indie rock
26	Just Feels Good	Thompson Square	Country
26	Afraid of Heights	Wavves	Pop punk; indie rock

=== April ===
Date	Title	Artist	Genre(s)
2	My Shame Is True	Alkaline Trio	Punk rock
2	Pioneer	The Band Perry	Country
2	Sempiternal	Bring Me the Horizon	Metalcore
2	Dear Miss Lonelyhearts	Cold War Kids	Indie rock
2	En Peligro de Extinction	Intocable	Norteño; Tejano
2	RKives (rarities album)	Rilo Kiley	Indie pop; indie rock
2	10	New Kids on the Block	Pop; dance
2	Wolf	Tyler, The Creator	West Coast hip hop
2	Anatidaephobia	Watch The Duck	Trap; electronic; dubstep; neo-soul
2	Right on Time	Gretchen Wilson	Country
4	Paint the Sky	Bradley Joseph	Contemporary instrumental; smooth jazz; Neoclassical (New Age)
9	Device	Device	Industrial metal; nu metal; alternative metal; hard rock
9	Three Chords and a Half Truth	Face to Face	Punk rock
9	The Road Less Traveled	Jake Miller	Hip hop
9	Wheelhouse	Brad Paisley	Country
9	Paramore	Paramore	Alternative rock; emo; pop rock; pop punk
9	Should've Gone to Bed (EP)	Plain White T's	Pop rock
9	Found	Rival Schools	Alternative rock; post-hardcore
9	Hotel California	Tyga	Hip hop
9	Wakin' on a Pretty Daze	Kurt Vile	Indie rock
9	Rough	Chuck Wicks	Country
15	Strawberries and Cream	Ninja Sex Party	Comedy rock; synthpop
16	Standoff	Casey Donahew Band	Country
16	In the Marrow	Dead Confederate	Rock; alternative rock
16	Save Rock and Roll	Fall Out Boy	Alternative rock; pop rock
16	The Terror	The Flaming Lips	Alternative rock; neo-psychedelia; experimental rock
16	Twelve Reasons to Die	Ghostface Killah	Hip hop
16	Ghost on Ghost	Iron & Wine	Indie pop; indie folk; jazz; blues
16	Indicud	Kid Cudi	Alternative hip hop
16	Free the Universe	Major Lazer	Electronic; dancehall; reggae; dubstep; bounce; moombahton
16	Rat Farm	Meat Puppets	Alternative rock; country rock
16	Heroes for Sale	Andy Mineo	Christian hip hop
16	Let's Face the Music and Dance	Willie Nelson	Country
16	Something Beautiful	Oleander	Alternative rock
16	As It Is On Earth	Spacehog	Alternative rock
16	Legendary	The Summer Set	Pop punk
16	Desperate Ground	The Thermals	
16	Mosquito	Yeah Yeah Yeahs	Alternative rock
22	I Love You.	The Neighbourhood	Alternative rock; indie pop
23	Illumination Ritual	The Appleseed Cast	Indie rock; post-rock; emo
23	Side Effects of You	Fantasia Barrino	R&B
23	Prisoner of Conscious	Talib Kweli	Alternative hip hop
23	Reincarnated	Snoop Lion	Reggae
23	Tate Stevens	Tate Stevens	Country
23	#willpower	will.i.am	Rap; pop
23	Venomous Rat Regeneration Vendor	Rob Zombie	Alternative Rock
30	Such Hot Blood	The Airborne Toxic Event	Alternative rock; Indie rock
30	Life on a Rock	Kenny Chesney	Country
30	Authentic	LL Cool J	Hip hop
30	The Pop Underground	Andrew McMahon	Piano rock; indie rock; electronic
30	Me, You & the Music	Jessica Sanchez	Pop; R&B
30	The Hands That Thieve	Streetlight Manifesto	Ska-Punk; punk rock
30	Wake Up	Youngblood Hawke	Indie pop; new wave

=== May ===
Date	Title	Artist	Genre(s)
7	2.0	98 Degrees	Pop
7	More Than Just a Dream	Fitz and the Tantrums	Soul; pop; alternative rock
7	Golden	Lady Antebellum	Country; country pop
7	Mother	Natalie Maines	Rock
7	Annie Up	Pistol Annies	Country
7	Volume 3	She & Him	Indie pop; alternative country
10	Secondhand Rapture	MS MR	Indie pop; alternative rock
14	Love Will...	Trace Adkins	Country
14	American Love LP	Bad Rabbits	Indie pop; R&B; funk
14	One of Us Is the Killer	The Dillinger Escape Plan	Mathcore; progressive metal
14	Ungrateful	Escape the Fate	Post-hardcore; metalcore; Alternative metal; hard rock; emo
14	Lip Lock	Eve	Hip hop
14	The Features	The Features	Indie rock; indie pop
14	Demi	Demi Lovato	Pop
14	Love Is Everything	George Strait	Country
14	Modern Vampires of the City	Vampire Weekend	Indie pop; indie rock
14	The Greatest Generation	The Wonder Years	Pop punk
21	Excuse My French	French Montana	East Coast hip hop
21	Trouble Will Find Me	The National	Indie rock
21	Love, Lust, Faith and Dreams	Thirty Seconds to Mars	Experimental rock
28	The Devil Put Dinosaurs Here	Alice in Chains	Heavy metal
28	Wrote a Song for Everyone	John Fogerty	Country; folk; country rock
28	IV Play	The-Dream	Contemporary R&B
28	Almost Home	Kid Ink	Hip Hop
29	Stop the Bleeding	Sponge	Alternative rock
31	From the Hills Below the City	Houndmouth	Indie rock; blues rock; alternative country

=== June ===
Date	Title	Artist	Genre(s)
4	Inspiration: A Tribute to Nat King Cole	George Benson	Jazz
4	In a Tidal Wave of Mystery	Capital Cities	Indie pop; dance-pop; pop rock
4	Forever Halloween	The Maine	Alternative rock; pop rock
4	Super Collider	Megadeth	Heavy metal; hard rock; thrash metal
4	Evil Friends	Portugal. The Man	Psychedelic rock; indie rock
4	...Like Clockwork	Queens of the Stone Age	Stoner rock
4	Spitfire	LeAnn Rimes	Country
4	Nightingale Floors	Rogue Wave	Indie rock
4	Feel	Sleeping With Sirens	Post-hardcore
11	Saaab Stories	Action Bronson	Hip hop
11	Fear Inside Our Bones	The Almost	Alternative rock; post-hardcore
11	24/Seven	Big Time Rush	Pop
11	Every Man Should Know	Harry Connick Jr.	Jazz; big band
11	Sunbather	Deafheaven	Ambient black metal; post-metal; post-rock; shoegazing
11	Magnetic	Goo Goo Dolls	Alternative rock; pop rock
11	Damage	Jimmy Eat World	Alternative rock
11	The Wack Album	The Lonely Island	Comedy; comedy hip hop
11	Southeastern	Jason Isbell	Rock; progressive country; alternative country
11	Better	Chrisette Michelle	R&B; soul; pop
11	Victim to Villain	New Years Day	Post-hardcore; pop punk; alternative metal
18	Omens	3OH!3	Pop; synthpop; electronic rock
18	Dark of the Daylight	The Crash Kings	Alternative rock; hard rock
18	Fashionably Late	Falling in Reverse	Post-hardcore; metalcore; pop punk; hard rock
18	Anthem	Hanson	Pop rock
18	Born Sinner	J. Cole	Hip hop
18	Watching Movies with the Sound Off	Mac Miller	Hip hop
18	Waiting for the Dawn	The Mowgli's	Alternative rock; pop rock
18	Talk a Good Game	Kelly Rowland	Pop; R&B
18	Yeezus	Kanye West	Hip hop
25	J.A.C.K.	Forever the Sickest Kids	Pop punk; pop rock
25	Zero	Hawthorne Heights	Alternative rock; post-hardcore; emo
25	Pick Up Your Head	Middle Class Rut	Alternative rock
25	Queensrÿche	Queensrÿche	Heavy metal; progressive metal
25	Rise	Skillet	Christian rock; alternative rock; hard rock
25	In a Warzone	Transplants	rock
25	The Gifted	Wale	Hip hop

=== July ===
Date	Title	Artist	Genre(s)
9	Somnambulist	Abandoned Pools	Alternative rock
9	Skitszo	Colette Carr	Hip-hop; dance-pop; electropop
9	Ciara	Ciara	Crunk&B; pop
9	Magna Carta... Holy Grail	Jay-Z	Hip hop
16	Trials & Tribulations	Ace Hood	Hip hop
16	The Blessed Unrest	Sara Bareilles	Pop rock; soul
16	Amelita	Court Yard Hounds	Country
16	White Teeth, Black Thoughts	Cherry Poppin' Daddies	Swing; jazz; rock; rockabilly; country
16	Stranger Than Fiction	Kevin Gates	Hip hop
16	Where Does This Door Go	Mayer Hawthorne	Neo soul; PBR&B
16	The Kitchen	Hieroglyphics	Alternative hip hop
16	No Filter	Lil Wyte & JellyRoll	Hip hop
16	Believers	¡Mayday!	Hip hop
16	Pepper	Pepper	Alternative rock; ska
23	Edward Sharpe and the Magnetic Zeros	Edward Sharpe and the Magnetic Zeros	Indie folk; folk rock
23	Torches & Pitchforks	Mona	Alternative rock; indie rock
23	Rich Gang	Rich Gang	Hip hop
23	Stars Dance	Selena Gomez	EDM; electropop
23	The Distortion Field	Trouble	Doom metal; heavy metal
23	The Keynote Speaker	U-God	Hip hop
23	Ricky Reed is Real	Wallpaper.	Pop; hip hop; electronic
30	In a World Like This	Backstreet Boys	Pop; dance-pop
30	Apex Predator	Crooked I	Hip hop
30	Nothing to Lose	Emblem3	Reggae; pop; pop rock
30	The Wrong Side of Heaven and the Righteous Side of Hell, Volume 1	Five Finger Death Punch	Heavy metal; groove metal; alternative metal; hard rock
30	All People	Michael Franti & Spearhead	Reggae fusion; ska punk
30	Something Else	Tech N9ne	Hip hop
30	Blurred Lines	Robin Thicke	Dance-pop; funk; soul

=== August ===
Day	Title	Artist	Genre(s)
6	The Civil Wars	The Civil Wars	Indie rock; alternative country
6	Golden Record	The Dangerous Summer	Alternative rock; pop punk; emo
6	Exorcise Tape (Esorcizzare Nastro)	Demon Queen	Electro-funk; synth-funk; R&B; trap
6	With Love	Christina Grimmie	Pop; R&B; soul
6	Cracking the Safe (EP)	Saving Abel	Hard rock; post-grunge; alternative rock
13	Crash My Party	Luke Bryan	Country
13	No Regerts	Chastity Belt	Indie rock
13	Paradise Valley	John Mayer	Folk rock; country rock; southern rock; Americana
13	Rebellious Soul	K. Michelle	R&B; soul
13	Call Your Friends	Zebrahead	Punk rock; pop punk; alternative rock; rapcore
18	Hear Ye Him	No Malice	Hip hop
20	Genuine & Counterfeit	William Beckett	Pop rock
20	Sway	Blue October	Rock; alternative rock
20	Songs from St. Somewhere	Jimmy Buffett	Soft rock; country; pop
20	Frames	Lee DeWyze	Folk; rock
20	Doris	Earl Sweatshirt	Alternative hip hop
20	The Walking in Between	Ben Rector	Pop rock
20	Sleeper	Ty Segall	Folk rock; psychedelic
27	Hail to the King	Avenged Sevenfold	Heavy metal; hard rock
27	Hall of Fame	Big Sean	Hip hop
27	Age Against the Machine	Goodie Mob	Hip hop
27	Stay Trippy	Juicy J	Hip hop

=== September ===
Day	Title	Artist	Genre(s)
1	Savage Life 4ever	Webbie	Hip hop
3	Bad Blood	Blood on the Dance Floor	Electronic; crunkcore
3	Love and War	Tamar Braxton	R&B
3	Yours Truly	Ariana Grande	R&B; pop
3	Love in the Future	John Legend	R&B; neo soul
3	Hesitation Marks	Nine Inch Nails	Industrial rock; alternative rock; electronica
3	Peace	Vista Chino	Stoner rock
9	The Things We Think We're Missing	Balance and Composure	Emo; alternative rock
9	MDNA World Tour	Madonna	Pop
10	B.O.A.T.S. II: Me Time	2 Chainz	Southern hip hop
10	Feels Like Home	Sheryl Crow	Country
10	The Standards	Gloria Estefan	Traditional pop; swing
10	Back 2 Life	Sean Kingston	Reggae fusion; hip hop; R&B; pop
10	On Oni Pond	Man Man	Experimental rock; indie pop
10	The Electric Lady	Janelle Monáe	Neo soul; R&B; funk; psychedelic soul
10	All I Want	The Reverb Junkie	Electropop; electronica
10	Fuse	Keith Urban	Country
17	Wise Up Ghost	Elvis Costello and The Roots	
17	We Are Tonight	Billy Currington	Country
17	Bookmarks	Five for Fighting	Pop rock
17	Spreading Rumours	Grouplove	Alternative rock; indie pop
17	From Here to Now to You	Jack Johnson	Folk rock; soft rock
17	Fight for My Soul	Jonny Lang	
17	Self Made Vol. 3	Maybach Music Group	Hip hop
17	MGMT	MGMT	Psychedelic rock
17	Off the Beaten Path	Justin Moore	Country
17	Loud Like Love	Placebo	Alternative rock
17	Saves the Day	Saves the Day	Pop punk; emo
17	A.M.	Chris Young	Country
17	Zendaya	Zendaya	Pop; dance-pop; R&B
24	Closer to the Truth	Cher	Pop; Electronic
24	Tattoos	Jason Derulo	R&B; pop
24	Suffering from Success	DJ Khaled	Hip hop
24	Dream Theater	Dream Theater	Progressive metal
24	The Ghost List (EP)	Girls Against Boys	Post-hardcore
24	Shout!	Gov't Mule	Hard rock
24	The Bluegrass Album	Alan Jackson	Bluegrass
24	Get Wet	Krewella	Electro house; progressive rock; dubstep
24	Mechanical Bull	Kings of Leon	Alternative rock; Southern rock
24	Ludaversal	Ludacris	Hip hop; R&B
24	Not What You Expected	Mest	Pop punk; punk rock
24	Through the Never	Metallica	Heavy metal
24	To All the Girls...	Willie Nelson	Country
24	Louder	R5	Pop rock
24	Rise	A Skylit Drive	Post-hardcore
30	Redneck Crazy	Tyler Farr	Country
30	M.O.	Nelly	Hip hop; R&B
30	The 20/20 Experience – 2 of 2	Justin Timberlake	Pop; R&B

=== October ===
Day	Title	Artist	Genre(s)
1	Deltron Event II	Deltron 3030	Alternative hip hop
1	Days Are Gone	Haim	Indie pop
1	Unvarnished	Joan Jett and the Blackhearts	Hard rock
7	Brighter	Patent Pending	Pop-punk; pop rock
8	Common Courtesy	A Day To Remember	Pop punk; post-hardcore
8	Before It Caves	A Loss For Words	Pop punk
8	Fortress	Alter Bridge	Rock
8	Old	Danny Brown	Alternative hip hop
8	Melophobia	Cage the Elephant	Alternative rock; garage rock
8	Bangerz	Miley Cyrus	Pop
8	Mountains of Sorrow, Rivers of Song	Amos Lee	Folk; neo soul
8	The Paradigm Shift	Korn	Nu metal; alternative metal
8	Monsters in the Closet	Mayday Parade	Punk rock; pop punk
8	Crickets	Joe Nichols	country
8	Too Weird to Live, Too Rare to Die!	Panic! at the Disco	Alternative rock; power pop
8	Frame by Frame	Cassadee Pope	Country; pop rock
8	Soy el Mismo	Prince Royce	Latin pop; bachata
8	My Name Is My Name	Pusha T	Hip hop
8	Bitter Rivals	Sleigh Bells	Noise pop; indie rock
8	The Finer Things	State Champs	Pop punk
8	High Rise (EP)	Stone Temple Pilots	Alternative rock; hard rock
8	Page Avenue: Ten Years and Counting	Story of the Year	Acoustic
8	My Independence	Erika Van Pelt	Pop rock
15	A Mary Christmas	Mary J. Blige	Christmas; R&B
15	Magpie and the Dandelion	The Avett Brothers	Folk; indie rock
15	Make a Move	Gavin DeGraw	Pop; blue-eyed soul
15	Let's Be Still	The Head and the Heart	Indie pop; indie folk
15	New	Paul McCartney	Rock
15	See You Tonight	Scotty McCreery	Country
15	Last Patrol	Monster Magnet	Stoner metal
15	To All the Girls...	Willie Nelson	Country
15	Lightning Bolt	Pearl Jam	Alternative rock; hard rock
15	Vengeance Falls	Trivium	Heavy metal; melodic metalcore
22	Burials	AFI	Alternative rock
22	12 Stories	Brandy Clark	Country
22	Better Together	Fifth Harmony	Pop; R&B
22	Prism	Katy Perry	Pop
29	Wrapped in Red	Kelly Clarkson	Christmas; pop
29	Duck the Halls: A Robertson Family Christmas	Duck Dynasty	Christmas
29	Night Time, My Time	Sky Ferreira	Indie rock; synthpop
29	Everything is Debatable	Hellogoodbye	Pop punk; indie pop; alternative rock
29	Drinks After Work	Toby Keith	Country
29	The Flood and the Mercy	Ed Kowalczyk	Alternative rock; rock
29	Recharged	Linkin Park	Alternative rock; electronic rock; rap rock
29	It Goes Like This	Thomas Rhett	Country
29	Corsicana Lemonade	White Denim	Indie rock; garage rock; progressive rock; Southern rock

=== November ===
Day	Title	Artist	Genre(s)
5	The Marshall Mathers LP 2	Eminem	Hip hop
5	Antiphon	Midlake	Alternative
5	PTX, Vol. II	Pentatonix	A cappella
11	ARTPOP	Lady Gaga	EDM; synth-pop
11	The Woman I Am	Kellie Pickler	Country; Christian country
11	Winter Loverland	Tamar Braxton	Christmas
12	Let It Snow: A Holiday Collection	Jewel	Christmas
12	See the Light	Less Than Jake	Punk rock; ska punk
12	weRwe Records: Volume One	Various Artists	Mult-genre
19	Homecoming	Sammy Adams	Hip hop
19	Baptized	Daughtry	Rock; alternative rock
19	The Wrong Side of Heaven and the Righteous Side of Hell, Volume 2	Five Finger Death Punch	Rock
19	Seven + Mary	Rainbow Kitten Surprise	Indie rock
19	No Country for Old Musicians	Reggie and the Full Effect	Alternative rock; pop-punk
25	Foreverly	Billie Joe Armstrong & Norah Jones	Folk
25	Danielle Bradbery	Danielle Bradbery	Country
26	Knock Madness	Hopsin	Hip hop

=== December ===
Date	Title	Artist	Genre(s)
3	Life, Love & Hope	Boston	rock; hard rock; pop rock
3	Britney Jean	Britney Spears	Pop; EDM; urban
10	Because the Internet	Childish Gambino	Hip hop
13	BEYONCÉ	Beyoncé	R&B; pop
13	Celestial Skies	This World	World; Contemporary Christian; progressive rock
16	Somewhere Somehow	We the Kings	Pop punk
17	Underground Luxury	B.o.B	Hip hop
17	Starbomb	Starbomb	Comedy hip hop; synthpop; nerdcore

== Top songs on record ==
=== Billboard Hot 100 No. 1 Songs ===
- "Blurred Lines" – Robin Thicke feat. T.I. and Pharrell (12 weeks)
- "Can't Hold Us" – Macklemore and Ryan Lewis feat. Ray Dalton (5 weeks)
- "Harlem Shake" – Baauer (5 weeks)
- "Just Give Me a Reason" – Pink feat. Nate Ruess (3 weeks)
- "Locked Out of Heaven" – Bruno Mars (4 weeks in 2013, 2 weeks in 2012)
- "Roar" – Katy Perry (2 weeks)
- "Royals" – Lorde (9 weeks)
- "The Monster" – Eminem feat. Rihanna (2 weeks in 2013, 2 weeks in 2014)
- "Thrift Shop" – Macklemore and Ryan Lewis feat. Wanz (6 weeks)
- "When I Was Your Man" – Bruno Mars (1 week)
- "Wrecking Ball" – Miley Cyrus (3 weeks)

=== Billboard Hot 100 Top 20 Hits ===
All songs that reached the Top 20 on the Billboard Hot 100 chart during the year, complete with peak chart placement.

- "22" – Taylor Swift (#20)
- "23" – Mike Will Made It feat. Miley Cyrus, Wiz Khalifa and Juicy J (#11)
- "All Me" – Drake feat. 2 Chainz and Big Sean (#20)
- "Applause" – Lady Gaga (#4)
- "#Beautiful" – Mariah Carey feat. Miguel (#15)
- "Beauty and a Beat" – Justin Bieber feat. Nicki Minaj (#5)
- "Berzerk" – Eminem (#3)
- "Best Song Ever" – One Direction (#2)
- "Blurred Lines" – Robin Thicke feat. T.I. and Pharrell (#1)
- "Bound 2" – Kanye West (#12)
- "Boys 'Round Here" – Blake Shelton feat. Pistol Annies and Friends (#12)
- "Burn" – Ellie Goulding (#13)
- "Can't Hold Us" – Macklemore and Ryan Lewis feat. Ray Dalton (#1)
- "Carry On" – fun. (#20)
- "Catch My Breath" – Kelly Clarkson (#19)
- "Clarity" – Zedd feat. Foxes (#8)
- "Come & Get It" – Selena Gomez (#6)
- "Counting Stars" – OneRepublic (#3)
- "Crash My Party" – Luke Bryan (#18)
- "Cruise" – Florida Georgia Line feat. Nelly (#4)
- "Cups (Pitch Perfect's "When I'm Gone")" – Anna Kendrick (#6)
- "Dark Horse" – Katy Perry feat. Juicy J (#17)
- "Daylight" – Maroon 5 (#7)
- "Demons" – Imagine Dragons (#6)
- "Diamonds" – Rihanna (#2 in 2013, #1 in 2012)
- "Diana" – One Direction (#11)
- "Die Young" – Kesha (#6 in 2013, #2 in 2012)
- "Do What U Want" – Lady Gaga feat. R. Kelly (#13)
- "Don't Stop the Party" – Pitbull feat. TJR (#17)
- "Don't You Worry Child" – Swedish House Mafia feat. John Martin (#6)
- "Dope" – Lady Gaga (#8)
- "Feel This Moment" – Pitbull feat. Christina Aguilera (#8)
- "Fuckin' Problems" – ASAP Rocky feat. Drake, Kendrick Lamar and 2 Chainz (#8)
- "Gangnam Style" – PSY (#6 in 2013, #2 in 2012)
- "Gentleman" – PSY (#5)
- "Get Lucky" – Daft Punk feat. Pharrell (#2)
- "Girl on Fire" – Alicia Keys feat. Nicki Minaj (#12 in 2013, #11 in 2012)
- "Gone" – Kanye West feat. Cam'ron and Consequence (#18)
- "Harlem Shake" – Baauer (#1)
- "Heart Attack" – Demi Lovato (#10)
- "Heartbreaker" – Justin Bieber (#13)
- "Here's to Never Growing Up" – Avril Lavigne (#20)
- "Ho Hey" – The Lumineers (#3)
- "Hold On, We're Going Home" – Drake feat. Majid Jordan (#4)
- "Holy Grail" – Jay-Z feat. Justin Timberlake (#4)
- "Home" – Phillip Phillips (#6)
- "I Cry" – Flo Rida (#8 in 2013, #6 in 2012)
- "I Knew You Were Trouble" – Taylor Swift (#2)
- "I Love It" – Icona Pop feat. Charli XCX (#7)
- "I Need Your Love" – Calvin Harris feat. Ellie Goulding (#16)
- "I Want Crazy" – Hunter Hayes (#19)
- "I Will Wait" – Mumford & Sons (#12)
- "It's Time" – Imagine Dragons (#15)
- "Just Give Me a Reason" – Pink feat. Nate Ruess (#1)
- "Let Her Go" – Passenger (#9)
- "Let Me Love You (Until You Learn to Love Yourself)" – Ne-Yo (#15 in 2013, #6 in 2012)
- "Little Drummer Boy" – Pentatonix (#13)
- "Little Talks" – Of Monsters and Men (#20)
- "Locked Out of Heaven" – Bruno Mars (#1)
- "Lolly" – Maejor Ali feat. Juicy J and Justin Bieber (#19)
- "Love Me" – Lil Wayne feat. Drake and Future (#9)
- "Love Somebody" – Maroon 5 (#10)
- "Mama's Broken Heart" – Miranda Lambert (#20)
- "Midnight Memories" – One Direction (#12)
- "Mirrors" – Justin Timberlake (#2)
- "My Nigga" – YG feat. Jeezy and Rich Homie Quan (#19)
- "My Songs Know What You Did in the Dark (Light Em Up)" – Fall Out Boy (#13)
- "One More Night" – Maroon 5 (#7 in 2013, #1 in 2012)
- "One Way or Another (Teenage Kicks)" – One Direction (#13)
- "Pour It Up" – Rihanna (#19)
- "Power Trip" – J. Cole feat. Miguel (#19)
- "Radioactive" – Imagine Dragons (#3)
- "Rap God" – Eminem (#7)
- "Roar" – Katy Perry (#1)
- "Royals" – Lorde (#1)
- "Safe and Sound" – Capital Cities (#8)
- "Sail" – AWOLNATION (#17)
- "Same Love" – Macklemore and Ryan Lewis feat. Mary Lambert (#11)
- "Say Something" – A Great Big World and Christina Aguilera (#4)
- "Scream & Shout" – will.i.am feat. Britney Spears (#3)
- "Some Nights" – fun. (#13 in 2013, #3 in 2012)
- "Started from the Bottom" – Drake (#6)
- "Stay" – Rihanna feat. Mikky Ekko (#3)
- "Stay the Night" – Zedd feat. Hayley Williams (#19)
- "Story of My Life" – One Direction (#6)
- "Suit & Tie" – Justin Timberlake feat. Jay-Z (#3)
- "Summertime Sadness" – Lana Del Rey and Cedric Gervais (#6)
- "Survival" – Eminem (#16)
- "Sweater Weather" – The Neighbourhood (#14)
- "Sweet Nothing" – Calvin Harris feat. Florence Welch (#10)
- "Swimming Pools (Drank)" – Kendrick Lamar (#20 in 2013, #17 in 2012)
- "#thatPower" – will.i.am feat. Justin Bieber (#17)
- "That's My Kind of Night" – Luke Bryan (#15)
- "The Fox (What Does the Fox Say?)" – Ylvis (#6)
- "The Monster" – Eminem feat. Rihanna (#1)
- "The Other Side" – Jason Derulo (#18)
- "The Way" – Ariana Grande feat. Mac Miller (#9)
- "Thrift Shop" – Macklemore and Ryan Lewis feat. Wanz (#1)
- "Timber" – Pitbull feat. Kesha (#2)
- "Treasure" – Bruno Mars (#5)
- "Try" – Pink (#9)
- "Unconditionally" – Katy Perry (#14)
- "U.O.E.N.O." – Rocko feat. Future and Rick Ross (#20)
- "Wagon Wheel" – Darius Rucker (#15)
- "Wake Me Up!" – Avicii (#4)
- "We Are Never Ever Getting Back Together" – Taylor Swift (#17 in 2013, #1 in 2012)
- "We Can't Stop" – Miley Cyrus (#2)
- "We Own It (Fast & Furious)" – 2 Chainz and Wiz Khalifa (#16)
- "When I Was Your Man" – Bruno Mars (#1)
- "White Walls" – Macklemore and Ryan Lewis feat. Schoolboy Q and Hollis (#15)
- "Work Bitch" – Britney Spears (#12)
- "Wrecking Ball" – Miley Cyrus (#1)

== Deaths ==
- January 1 – Patti Page, 85, country singer ("Tennessee Waltz")
- January 4 – Sammy Johns, 66, country singer-songwriter
- January 7 – Sam Pace, 68, R&B singer (The Esquires)
- January 11 – Jimmy O'Neill, 73, radio and television host
- January 18 – Bobby Bennett, 74, R&B singer (The Famous Flames)
- January 19 – Steve Knight, 77, keyboardist (Mountain)
- January 20 – Bob Engemann, 77, singer (The Lettermen)
- January 22 – Tony Douglas, 83, country singer
- January 25 – Gregory Carroll, 83, singer-songwriter and producer
- January 26 – Leroy "Sugarfoot" Bonner, 69, R&B singer (The Ohio Players)
- January 30
  - Patty Andrews, 94, pop singer (The Andrews Sisters)
  - Ann Rabson, 67, singer, pianist, and guitarist
- February 5 – Paul Tanner, 95, big band trombonist (Glenn Miller Orchestra)
- February 16 – Stanley Knight, 64, rock guitarist (Black Oak Arkansas)
- February 17 – Mindy McCready, 37, country music singer ("Guys Do It All the Time")
- February 18 – Damon Harris, 62, R&B singer (The Temptations)
- February 21 – Cleotha Staples, 78, gospel singer (The Staple Singers)
- February 25 – Dan Toler, 64, guitarist (The Allman Brothers Band)
- February 27
  - Van Cliburn, 78, pianist
  - Richard Street, 70, R&B singer (The Temptations)
- February 28 – DJ Ajax, 41, Australian techno musician and producer
- March 1
  - Jewel Akens, 79, singer and record producer
  - Magic, 37, rapper (Body Head Bangerz)
- March 3 – Bobby Rogers, 73, R&B singer-songwriter (The Miracles)
- March 4 – Fran Warren, 87, pop singer
- March 7 – Claude King, 90, country singer-songwriter ("Wolverton Mountain")
- March 8
  - Ricardo da Force, 45, English dance vocalist and rapper (The KLF, N-Trance)
  - Sammy Masters, 82, rockabilly musician
- March 12 – Clive Burr, 56, English metal drummer (Iron Maiden)
- March 14 – Jack Greene, 83, country singer ("There Goes My Everything")
- March 16
  - Bobby Smith, 76, R&B singer (The Spinners)
  - Jason Molina, 39, folk singer-songwriter
- March 19 – Floyd "Buddy" McRae, 85, singer (The Chords)
- March 20 – Eddie Bond, 79, rockabilly singer and guitarist
- March 24 – Deke Richards, 68, songwriter
- March 26 – Margie Alexander, 64, gospel and soul singer
- April 6 – Don Shirley, 86, jazz pianist and composer
- April 8 – Annette Funicello, 70, actress and pop singer ("Tall Paul")
- April 11 – Jonathan Winters, 87, stand-up comedian, actor and recording artist
- April 13 – Chi Cheng, 42, metal and alternative bassist (Deftones)
- April 15 – Scott Miller, 53, alternative singer-songwriter (Game Theory, The Loud Family)
- April 17 – George Perkins, 70, singer
- April 22 – Nathaniel Romerson, 75, R&B singer (The Ballads)
- April 21 – Chrissy Amphlett, 53, Australian rock singer (Divinyls)
- April 22 – Richie Havens, 72, folk singer ("Here Comes the Sun")
- April 26 – George Jones, 81, country singer ("He Stopped Loving Her Today")
- May 1 – Chris Kelly, 34, rapper (Kris Kross)
- May 2 – Jeff Hanneman, 49, metal guitarist (Slayer)
- May 7 – Romanthony, 46, electronic dance singer and producer ("One More Time")
- May 11 – Ollie Mitchell, 86, trumpet player (The Wrecking Crew)
- May 17 – Alan O'Day, 72, singer-songwriter
- May 20
  - Ray Manzarek, 74, rock organist (The Doors) and record producer
  - Zach Sobiech, 18, singer-songwriter
- May 21
  - Raymond Reid, 60, trombonist (Crown Heights Affair)
  - Bob Thompson, 88, composer, arranger, and orchestra leader
- May 24 – Lorene Mann, 76, country music singer and songwriter
- May 25
  - Tyrone Brunson, 57, singer and musician
  - Marshall Lytle, 79, bassist (Bill Haley & His Comets)
- May 26 – Clarence Burke, Jr, 64, soul singer (The Five Stairsteps)
- May 29 – Marvin Junior, 77, R&B singer (The Dells)
- May 31 – Shelbra Bennett, 66, singer (The Soul Children)
- June 2
  - Rob Morsberger, 53, American-English singer-songwriter
  - MickDeth, 35, bass player (Eighteen Visions and Clear)
- June 4
  - Joey Covington, 67, rock drummer (Jefferson Airplane, Jefferson Starship, Hot Tuna)
  - Cornelius "Nini" Harp, 73, singer (The Marcels)
  - Jim Sundquist, 75, guitarist (The Fendermen)
- June 5
  - Don Bowman, 75, country music singer
  - Marshall Sewell, 75, bass singer (The Edsels)
- June 6 – Elaine Laron, 83, songwriter
- June 11 – Johnny Smith, 90, jazz guitarist
- June 14 – Tom Tall, 75, rockabilly singer
- June 15 – Robert Morris "B.J." Jones (70), rock guitarist (Sweathog)
- June 17 – Carmen Carrozza, 92, accordionist
- June 19 – Slim Whitman, 90, country singer-songwriter ("Secret Love")
- June 21 – Mary Love, 69, soul and gospel singer
- June 23
  - Bobby Bland, 83, soul and blues singer ("That's the Way Love Is" )
  - Little Willie Littlefield, 81, singer-songwriter and pianist
- June 24
  - Puff Johnson, 40, singer-songwriter
  - Alan Myers, 58, new wave drummer (Devo)
- June 27 – Paul Giacalone, 73, singer (The Fireflies)
- July 1 – Texas Johnny Brown, 85, singer-songwriter and guitarist
- July 8 – Brett Walker, 51, songwriter and producer
- July 9 – Jim Foglesong, 90, record producer
- July 11 – Charles Pope, 76, R&B singer (The Tams)
- July 16 – T-Model Ford, (exact age unknown; believed to be in early 90s), blues guitarist and singer
- July 21 – Faye Hunter, 59, alternative bassist (Let's Active)
- July 23 – Dominguinhos, 72, composer, accordionist, and singer
- July 26 – J.J. Cale, 74, blues singer-songwriter and guitarist ("Cocaine")
- August 1 – Toby Saks, 71, cellist
- August 3 – Les Cooper, 92, doo wop musician
- August 4 – Tim Wright, experimental rock bassist (Pere Ubu, DNA)
- August 5 – George Duke, 67, jazz and funk keyboardist
- August 8 – Jack Clement, 82, country singer-songwriter
- August 10
  - Eydie Gormé, 84, singer
  - Jody Payne, 77, country guitarist (Willie Nelson's Family)
- August 13 – Tompall Glaser, 79, country singer
- August 14 – Allen Lanier, 67, rock keyboardist and guitarist (Blue Öyster Cult)
- August 19 – Cedar Walton, 79, hard-bop jazz pianist
- August 20 – Marian McPartland, 95, jazz pianist and radio broadcaster (Piano Jazz)
- August 23 – Joey LaCaze, 42, metal drummer (Eyehategod)
- September 1 – Joe Kelley, 67, guitarist and bassist (The Shadows of Knight)
- September 9 – Forrest, 60, singer
- September 16 – Mac Curtis, 74, rockabilly singer
- September 17 – Marvin Rainwater, 88, country and rockabilly singer and songwriter
- September 25 – Billy Mure, 97, guitarist
- September 30 – Zulema, 66, singer and songwriter
- October 8 – Larry Verne, 79, singer
- October 10
  - Jan Kuehnemund, 51, hard rock guitarist (Vixen)
  - Cal Smith, 81, country music singer
- October 15 – Gloria Lynne, 83, jazz singer
- October 20 – Leon Ashley, 77, country singer
- October 26 – Al Johnson, 65, R&B singer (The Unifics)
- October 27 – Lou Reed, 71, rock singer-songwriter (The Velvet Underground)
- October 30 – Pete Haycock, 62, musician (Climax Blues Band) and film score composer
- October 31 – Bobby Parker, 76, blues-rock guitarist, singer and songwriter
- November 6
  - Lee Crystal, drummer (Joan Jett and the Blackhearts)
  - Clyde Stacy, 77, rockabilly singer
- November 11 – Bob Beckham, 86, country singer
- November 29
  - Oliver Cheatham, 65, R&B singer ("Get Down Saturday Night")
  - Dick Dodd, 68, drummer and singer (The Standells)
- December 2 – Rex Garvin, 73, singer-songwriter and keyboard player
- December 8 – John Wyker, 68, songwriter (Sailcat)
- December 11 – Tommy Ruger, 67, drummer (The Nightcrawlers)
- December 16 – Ray Price, 87, country singer-songwriter ("Crazy Arms")
- December 20 – Lord Infamous, 40, rapper (Three 6 Mafia)
- December 23 – Yusef Lateef, 93, jazz musician
- December 29 – Benjamin Curtis, 35, alternative guitarist and songwriter (Secret Machines, School of Seven Bells, Tripping Daisy)

== See also ==
- 2010s in music
- 2013 in American television
- List of 2013 albums
