= The Road Ahead (album) =

Compilation album by Bradley Joseph
- Released: 2004
- Genre: Instrumental; Adult contemporary Easy listening
- Label: Orange Music
- Producer: Bradley Joseph

Bradley Joseph chronology
Music Pets Love: While You Are Gone (2004–2008)	The Road Ahead (2004)	In the Heart of Everyone (2004)

The Road Ahead is a compilation album by Bradley Joseph containing songs from his albums One Deep Breath, Solo Journey, The Journey Continues, and Hear the Masses.

== Track listing ==
1. "Rose Colored Glasses"
2. "Wildflowers"
3. "The Gift"
4. "If I could Fly"
5. "Wind Farmer"
6. "Dreamers Lullaby"
7. "Fridays Child"
8. "Is This A Dream"
9. "In The Heart Of Everyone"
10. "A Moments Rest"
11. "The Road Ahead"
12. "Seasons End"
13. "Dancers Waltz"
14. "Letters From Home"

== Personnel ==
- All music composed, produced, and performed by Bradley Joseph.
