= In the Heart of Everyone =

Compilation album by Bradley Joseph
- Released: 2004
- Genre: Instrumental; Adult contemporary Easy listening
- Label: Orange Music
- Producer: Bradley Joseph

Bradley Joseph chronology
The Road Ahead (2004)	In the Heart of Everyone (2004)	For the Love of It (2005)

In the Heart of Everyone is a compilation album released by Orange Music containing select songs taken from Bradley Joseph's previously released One Deep Breath, Solo Journey, The Journey Continues, and Hear the Masses. It is distributed throughout Singapore, Hong Kong, Malaysia, Taiwan, Thailand, and Indonesia. In a review by Yeoh Wee Teck of In the Heart of Everyone, he remarked "Instead of attempting to fuse elements of different cultures like everyone else, he chose to rely on what he knows best - simple arrangements with assured piano playing."

== Track listing ==
1. "A Light From Home"
2. "Yesterday is But a Dream"
3. "A Summer's Story"
4. "A Warm Breeze"
5. "The Poetry Room"
6. "Away From the World"
7. "Winter Moon"
8. "My Friend"
9. "Letting Go"
10. "An Ocean Above"
11. "The Long Last Mile"
12. "In Peace"

BONUS TRACKS:
13. "The Road Ahead"
14. "Wind Farmer" (Piano Version)
15. "In The Heart of Everyone"

== Personnel ==
- All music composed, produced, and performed by Bradley Joseph.
