= Crash Test Dude =

Live album by Brad Roberts
- Released: November 5, 2001
- Recorded: Ted's Wrecking Yard, Toronto, Ontario, Canada, 2000 and Metalworks Studios in Mississauga, Ontario
- Length: 90:23
- Label: Cha-Ching Records
- Producer: Paul Tozer and Brad Roberts

Brad Roberts chronology
Crash Test Dude (2001)	Rajanaka: Mantra (2011)

Crash Test Dude: Brad Roberts Live Singing Your Favorite Hits, or simply Crash Test Dude, is a live album performed by Crash Test Dummies lead singer Brad Roberts during his solo acoustic tour following the Give Yourself a Hand tour. The album was released, along with an accompanying rockumentary film, exclusively through the MapleMusic.com e-commerce portal.

== Album ==
=== Reception ===
Professional ratings
Review scores
Source	Rating
Allmusic	1.5/5 stars

The album received mixed to poor reviews. Allmusic writer Aaron Badgley gave it 1½ out of 5 stars and states that "choosing to debut with a live disc was not a good idea, as this CD is full of Roberts' rants and childish cover versions. It is also the performance of an artist who does not seem to care a great deal about his audience. Sure, the Crash Test Dummies hits are here, in stripped-down, almost acoustic versions. And it is for those songs alone that CD even deserves a listen. The versions are nowhere near as good as the original studio recordings, but at least they have a form, are complete, and are listenable. His version of Britney Spears' Baby One More Time following a poem titled Circumcision is neither funny or ironic. It is plain pathetic. And his rants between songs are just the ramblings of a drunken performer (he makes it clear that he continues to drink throughout the show)."

=== Track listing ===
Disc 1
No.	Title	Writer(s)	Length
1.	"Introductory Remarks"		1:52
2.	"Understand Your Man"	Johnny Cash	3:05
3.	"An aside regarding prostitution"		1:09
4.	"Androgynous"	Paul Westerberg	3:38
5.	"I Want to Par-tay!"	Brad Roberts, Greg Wells	2:52
6.	"Oral sex is proffered by Mr Roberts in order to compensate a customer for the high ticket price"		0:35
7.	"Cocaine"	Gary Davis	4:14
8.	"Give Yourself A Hand"	Roberts, Wells	3:28
9.	"Trident Gum Theme"		1:33
10.	"Da Do Ron Ron"	Jeff Barry, Ellie Greenwich, Phil Spector	3:49
11.	"A discussion of bowel difficulties during the performance"		1:06
12.	"Afternoons and Coffeespoons"	Roberts	4:19
13.	"A Poem, "Scientific Management", is read"		3:08
14.	"Keep a Lid on Things"	Roberts, Wells	2:43
15.	"A hilariously derisive account of my heritage ensues, as I banter on, ever more wittily, the scotch now coursing through my body as I experience an ever increasing alcohol-induced euphoria"		1:01
16.	"Superman's Song"	Roberts	5:00

Disc 2
No.	Title	Writer(s)	Length
1.	"Relation between bass baritone guitar and the penis is discussed"		1:23
2.	"God Shuffled His Feet"	Roberts	3:52
3.	"My Freedom from all STD's is firmly and self-servingly established"		1:04
4.	"A Cigarette Is All You Get"	Roberts, Wells	3:13
5.	"He Liked to Feel It"	Roberts	4:09
6.	"The String Change Song"		2:32
7.	"Delilah"	Les Reed, Barry Mason	4:33
8.	"La Grange"	Frank Beard, Billy Gibbons, Joel Michael Dusty Hill	2:54
9.	"Torontonian's: Pro's and Con's"		1:10
10.	"Unbreak My Heart"	Diane Warren	4:36
11.	"My Reputation in the politically correct press as "Crash Test Drunkard""		1:31
12.	"Bette Davis Eyes"	Donna Weiss and Jackie DeShannon	2:53
13.	"Another poem, entitled "Circumcision" is read"		3:33
14.	"Baby One More Time"	Martin Carl Sandberg	3:29
15.	"Mmm Mmm Mmm"	Roberts	5:27
16.	"Encore" (Superman's Song Reprise)	Roberts	0:51

=== Personnel ===
- Brad Roberts – lead vocals, acoustic guitar, bass baritone guitar
- Murray Pulver – back-up vocals, acoustic guitar, electric guitar

== Film ==
Crash Test Dude: The Brad Roberts Rockumentary
- Directed by: Brad Roberts; Jeff Stephenson; Jason Tan
- Starring: Brad Roberts; Murray Pulver
- Music by: Brad Roberts
- Distributed by: Cha-Ching Records
- Release date: 5 November 2001
- Country: Canada
- Language: English

Crash Test Dude was also released as a rockumentary film. The film features a candid, behind-the-scenes look at Brad Robert's solo tour across Canada and the Northern U.S.
