= For the Love of It =

For the Love of It may refer to:

- For the Love of It (album), a 2005 album by Bradley Joseph
- "For the Love of It" (song), a 1999 song by Salmonella Dub
- For the Love of It (film), a 1980 TV movie featuring Adam West
- For the Love of It, Pepsi's new tagline in replacement of "Live for Now"
