= Paint the Sky =

Studio album by Bradley Joseph
- Released: April 4, 2013
- Genre: Instrumental; Easy listening
- Length: 54:33
- Label: Robbins Island
- Producer: Bradley Joseph

Bradley Joseph chronology
Suites & Sweets (2009)	Paint the Sky (2013)

Inside the Stars
Bill Binkelman of Wind and Wire describes this song as "an uptempo, joyous lead piano melody accented by bouncy rhythms played on kit drums, thumping bass, and tambourine plus superlative orchestral strings".

In Dreams Awake
Binkelman opines that "In Dreams Awake" bears a strong contemporary classical influence and that some people might even hear strains of Philip Glass' music. Parsons characterizes it as "a concept piece that begins with an intense and intriguing theme for cello or viola and strings. Building as it evolves, it never takes a breath until near the end of the theme.

Secrets of the Sun
Lush strings and gorgeous new age synths kick off "Secrets of the Sun" with the piano melody here brimming with a blend of the ethereal and the romantic with a dash of wistfulness besides. Parsons states this is much calmer and more graceful with a piano melody and keyboard enhancements.

Paint the Sky is the 21st studio album by Bradley Joseph released April 4, 2013 on the Robbins Island Music label. It is Joseph's first album of original compositions in ten years. He calls the album "piano instrumentals with a cinematic feel". He received requests from listeners to make another album of original compositions that incorporate orchestration with piano, similar to Hear the Masses and Rapture.

== Critical reception ==
John P. Olsen of New Age Music World writes that " Paint the Sky ...is best expressed by the near even number of songs with upbeat melodies and lively rhythms, with the balance centered by a light, casual relaxed atmosphere...with importance given to melodic rhythm and phrasing." In another review of Paint the Sky, Bill Binkelman of Wind and Wire says that "Joseph is one of the very best artists when it comes to crafting piano instrumentals augmented by the spot-on application of an assortment of keyboard embellishments, from standard orchestral accompaniment to more textural/new age elements". Kathy Parsons of MainlyPiano states "The thirteen pieces...range from tender to majestic. Several pieces are solo piano and others are orchestrated with keyboards to give a vibrant, cinematic effect."

Binkelman describes the song "Inside the Stars" as "an uptempo, joyous lead piano melody accented by bouncy rhythms played on kit drums, thumping bass, and tambourine plus superlative orchestral strings".

In an analysis of "In Dreams Awake", Binkelman opines that this song bears a strong contemporary classical influence and that some people might even hear strains of Philip Glass's music. He says there is an exultant feel to the melody, but because Joseph maintains absolute control of nuance and shading the song never descends into overblown melodrama or bombast. As the track progresses, the mood and style shifts into a more identifiable new age motif, with more textural synths, bell tones and bell trees, and a more pronounced sweeping sensation of subdued grandeur. The Glass-like motif returns for the song’s finale. Parsons characterizes this same song as "a concept piece that begins with an intense and intriguing theme for cello or viola and strings. Building as it evolves, it never takes a breath until near the end of the theme. From there, the piece becomes dreamy and ambient, "floating effortlessly" on keyboard sounds until the original strings re-enter, increasing to the intensity of the first theme".

Binkelman goes on to say that the song "Into the Big Blue" should instantly call Aaron Copland to mind – it has the same big orchestral/cinematic sound to it, along with Copland-esque western rhythm and melodic motifs.

In reference to the song "Secrets of the Sun", Binkelman describes "lush strings and gorgeous new age synths with the piano melody here brimming with a blend of the ethereal and the romantic with a dash of wistfulness besides". The synth sounds remind him a little of Ray Lynch. Parsons details this as "much calmer and more graceful with a piano melody and keyboard enhancements".

== Track listing ==
1. "Inside the Stars"
2. "Secrets of the Sun"
3. "Into the Big Blue"
4. "Your Eyes Say Goodbye"
5. "In Dreams Awake"
6. "Rainbow Fields"
7. "I'll Wait for You"
8. "What a Time It Was"
9. "The Edge of My Heart"
10. "Brave New Day"
11. "Light Through the Trees"
12. "Spirit of the Calm"
13. "Remembering"

== Personnel ==
- All music composed, produced, and performed by Bradley Joseph.
