= Classic Christmas =

Classic Christmas may refer to:

- Classic Christmas (Johnny Cash album), 1980
- Classic Christmas (Billy Gilman album), 2000
- Classic Christmas (George Strait album), 2008
- Classic Christmas (Bradley Joseph album), 2008
- Classic Christmas (Joe McElderry album), 2011
- A Classic Christmas (Wynonna Judd album), 2006
- A Classic Christmas (Toby Keith album), 2007
