= A Man in Love =

A Man in Love or Man in Love may refer to:

- A Man in Love (novel), 2008 by Martin Walser
- A Man in Love, novel by Karl Ove Knausgård
- A Man in Love (1987 film), a French-Italian-British drama film
- Man in Love (2014 film), a South Korean romance drama film
- "A Man in Love", 1972 single by George Perkins

== See also ==
- "Galjeung (A Man in Love)", Korean song by Super Junior
