= David Levin (singer) =

American author and singer-songwriter

David L. Levin
- Origin: United States
- Genres: Pop, rock
- Occupations: Singer-songwriter, author, speaker
- Years active: 1975–present
- Labels: Day Eleven
- Website: www.davidlevin.com

David L. Levin is an American author and singer-songwriter who has recorded with such artists as Bradley Joseph. He started his career as keyboardist for the band Patriot and later released four albums as a solo artist. His first release, Heaven, features Paul Peterson on bass. His third album, Stepping on My Hat, drew favorable comparisons to artists such as Sting and a number of pop and rock influences from the late 1970s and early 1980s.

Levin has co-authored three books including QBQ! The Question Behind the Question, which has sold over a million copies. He authored the book Don't Just Talk, Be Heard! and is a professional speaker on business communication, leadership, and personal development.

== Early life, career ==
David Levin began playing music and working with computers at a young age. He joined his first rock band in 1975 while still in high school, a band named Pegasus. In 1976 he took several classes at University of Montana while still in high school, where he studied computers, math and music. He later joined Patriot, formerly named John Thoennes and the All American Band and toured with them through 1985. He then founded The David Levin Band, which disbanded in 1987. Several years later he joined The Screaming Yahoos as guitar player and lead singer. From 1987 to 1994 he waited tables in Minneapolis, and also had his own audio production company from 1992 to 1999. He used a recording studio in his basement to do work for both musicians and professional speakers. He became founder and CEO of Day Eleven, Inc in 1992.

== Writing and speaking career ==
In 1995 Levin began working with John G. Miller as a speaking coach and writing partner. He began speaking with the company QBQ! in 1998. In 1999 he helped John Miller co-write the book Personal Accountability, and he later helped Miller co-write QBQ! The Question Behind the Question, which has sold over a million copies, as well as Outstanding! 47 Ways to Make Your Organization Exceptional and Flipping the Switch. Levin has also authored Don't Just Talk, Be Heard! and regularly speaks at corporate functions and to business-people about communication and effective leadership.

== Music career ==
In 1983, while still in Patriot, David made a demo recording of original music with producer and Canadian Rock and Roll Hall of Fame inductee Domenic Troiano. The Screaming Yahoos released a self-titled EP in 1995, produced by Nashville artist John Beland and Australian producer Brian Cadd. Levin's first solo album was released in 1997 on his Day Eleven label. Heaven features David Barry (guitar), Paul Peterson (bass), and Rick Barron (co-writer and background vocals), and has a rock and pop style. Also in 1997, he contributed vocals to the album Rapture by Bradley Joseph. Levin's second album, Zuni, was released in 2002 on Day Eleven. The acoustic album "reflected his time on the Zuni Indian Reservation" in New Mexico, where he lived from 1999 to 2002. His song "Second Wind" was covered by Australian artist Dave Ritter.

=== Stepping on My Hat (2004) ===
His third album, Stepping on My Hat, was released on October 27, 2004, and received positive reviews. Two songs from the album; "Demolition Boy" and "Blood and Feathers" — were honored in the 2004 Great American Song Contest.

Reception

Caffeine Magazine gave the album 4/5 stars and called it a "tasteful record with interesting lyrics." MusicCritic.ca gave it 3.5/5 stars, calling it "an experiment in late 1970s/early 1980s inspired pop rock. The songs here make for minimalist pop rock, yet with their densely layered instrumentation the songs are melodically accessible and complex enough to warrant multiple listens."

According to one review, "Levin's lyrics are equal parts wit and gravity which he underscores with an appropriate soundtrack of wild abandon or somber reflection." His music drew comparisons to early Police, Peter Gabriel, and the Gin Blossoms. Another review stated "The guitar work is utterly amazing, with licks that every soft-rocker aims to create," and again drew comparisons to Sting, Fastball, XTC, and Train.

The Copper Press stated that "David Levin's work runs in a stream with the best of Peter Gabriel as well as the late Kevin Gilbert and Gilbert's partner in the ill-fated but brilliant Toy Matinee, Patrick Leonard...it's refreshing to hear a writer capable of weaving substantive lyrics and music together and balancing depth and levity with honesty and grace." Also, "The music has the jaunty bounce of some of the best early-80s pop, when ska beats were first meeting punks’ three-chords. Levin’s voice adds warmth to the inherent good humor conveyed by many of the songs words." and he "channels the early years of The Police, burnishing the first seven tracks with astute songwriting and deft musicality."

=== Criminal (2008) ===
He released his fourth album, Criminal, in 2008. Levin performed essentially all parts on the album, including vocals, songwriting, guitar, manipulating a synthesizer and other tasks, with some musician-friends adding "touches of percussion and keyboards."

According to the Minnesota Post, "After the release of 2005's Stepping on My Hat, critics were nearly unanimous about the resemblance between Levin's music and that of the Police." Levin stated "I just don't like being so transparently unoriginal. I'd like to think they're an influence, but not [that I was doing] an impersonation. I did take a harder look at my material...I started to realize that as hard as I had worked [on the first three CDs], I could've worked harder in raising the bar. Not letting any passage in a song go by and thinking, 'Oh, maybe I could have done that a little better.' "

The Minnesota Post states "The CD is instead a glimpse at Levin through some other voices. His "Jet Boy," a song about his 3-year-old son, is buoyant guitar rock conjuring up echoes of Robert Palmer, while Elton John reverberates in the title track, and the synth-bop of "Evil Genius" (a song about a young Karl Rove svengali-type) might well take you all the way back to new wave and the 1980s."

== Personal life ==
He met his wife, Margaret, waiting tables in Minneapolis in the late 1980s, and together they have two children, Peter and Frances. Since 2010 they have lived in Viroqua, Wisconsin. He also has an older son, Aaron, from a previous relationship. His hobbies include running, skiing, and flying.

== Publishing history ==
- 1998: Personal Accountability – (Denver Press, ISBN 978-0966583205) – co-author
- 2001: QBQ! The Question Behind the Question: Practicing Personal Accountability at Work and in Life (ISBN 978-0399152337) – co-author
- 2005: Flipping the Switch: Unleash the Power of Personal Accountability Using the QBQ! (Putnam Adult, ISBN 978-0399152955) – co-author
- 2009: Don't Just Talk, Be Heard! (Minneapolis Press, ISBN 978-0981989204)
- 2010: Outstanding!: 47 Ways to Make Your Organization Exceptional (Putnam Adult, ISBN 978-0399156403) – co-author

== Discography ==
=== Collaborations ===
- 1997: Rapture by Bradley Joseph – vocals

=== Solo albums ===
- 1997: Heaven
- 2002: Zuni
- 2004: Stepping on My Hat
- 2008: Criminal
