= Hymns and Spiritual Songs =

Hymns and Spiritual Songs may refer to:

- Hymns and Spiritual Songs (book), a 1765 book by Christopher Smart
- Hymns and Spiritual Songs (album), a 2007 album by Bradley Joseph
