= Suites & Sweets =

Suites and Sweets

Studio album by Bradley Joseph
- Released: June 15, 2009
- Genre: Classical
- Label: Robbins Island
- Producer: Bradley Joseph

Bradley Joseph chronology
Classic Christmas (2008)	Suites and Sweets (2009)	Paint the Sky (2013)

Suites & Sweets is the 16th studio album by Bradley Joseph released in 2009 on the Robbins Island Music label. It is a collection of classical musical suites on the piano.

Joseph told Jane Fredericksen of the St. Croix Valley Press that, "'Suites are a series of classical movements... and 'Sweets' — something gratifying and delightful, it's kind of a play on words." The album features compositions by Beethoven, Mozart, Bach, and other classical composers in which Joseph "took the best parts and movements out of those classical songs...and made it soft and calm all the way through."

== Track listing ==
1. "The Swan" (Saint-Saëns)
2. "First Arabesque" (Debussy)
3. "Air on the G String" (Bach)
4. "Minuetto" (Boccherini)
5. "Sonata in C / 2nd Mov." (Mozart)
6. "Largo" (Handel)
7. "Prelude in C" (Bach)
8. "Piano Concerto No. 21"' (Mozart)
9. "Cello Suite" (Bach)
10. "Emperor Waltz" (Strauss)
11. "Minuet in G major" (Bach)
12. "Symphony No. 7" / 2nd Mov. (Beethoven)
13. "Minuet in G" (Beethoven)
14. "Spring Song" (Mendelssohn)

== Personnel ==
- All music arranged and performed by Bradley Joseph.
