= God Shuffled His Feet =

1993 studio album by Crash Test Dummies

Studio album by Crash Test Dummies
- Released: October 26, 1993
- Recorded: 1993
- Studios: DV Productions, Milwaukee, Wisconsin, and Music Head Recording, Lake Geneva, Wisconsin
- Genres: Alternative rock; folk rock
- Length: 44:45
- Labels: BMG; Arista
- Producers: Jerry Harrison; Crash Test Dummies

Crash Test Dummies chronology
The Ghosts That Haunt Me (1991)	God Shuffled His Feet (1993)	A Worm's Life (1996)

Singles from God Shuffled His Feet
- 1. "Mmm Mmm Mmm Mmm" Released: October 1993; 2. "Swimming in Your Ocean" Released: January 1994; 3. "Afternoons & Coffeespoons" Released: June 1994; 4. "God Shuffled His Feet" Released: October 1994

God Shuffled His Feet is the second album by Canadian band Crash Test Dummies, released in 1993. It features their most popular single, "Mmm Mmm Mmm Mmm". The cover art superimposes the band members' faces over the figures of Titian's painting Bacchus and Ariadne. It was their most successful album commercially, as it sold over eight million copies worldwide.

== Reception ==
Professional ratings
Review scores
Source	Rating
AllMusic	4.5/5 stars
Robert Christgau	(neither)
Drowned in Sound	8/10
Entertainment Weekly	B−
Music Week	4/5 stars
Smash Hits	3/5 stars

The album was the band's biggest mainstream hit. AllMusic writer Stephen Thomas Erlewine attributes the album's success to "Jerry Harrison's remarkably clear and focused production" and that "apart from the relatively concise pop smarts of the singles "Mmm Mmm Mmm Mmm" and "Afternoons and Coffeespoons," God Shuffled His Feet isn't all that different from the band's first album."

== Commercial performance ==
God Shuffled His Feet was a number-one album in Austria and New Zealand, and also reached the top five in the national albums charts of numerous countries such as Australia, Norway, Sweden and Switzerland. In addition, the album reached number six in the Netherlands national albums chart, number two in the UK Albums Chart, and number nine in the United States Billboard 200 albums chart. In their native Canada, it never reached higher than number 11 on the national charts, but fueled by the success of its four singles (all Top 20 hits there) the album eventually reached triple platinum status.

== Track listing ==
All tracks are written by Brad Roberts.

No.	Title	Length
1.	"God Shuffled His Feet"	5:10
2.	"Afternoons & Coffeespoons"	3:56
3.	"Mmm Mmm Mmm Mmm"	3:55
4.	"In the Days of the Caveman"	3:41
5.	"Swimming in Your Ocean"	3:49
6.	"Here I Stand Before Me"	3:07
7.	"I Think I'll Disappear Now"	4:52
8.	"How Does a Duck Know?"	3:42
9.	"When I Go Out with Artists"	3:44
10.	"The Psychic"	3:48
11.	"Two Knights and Maidens"	3:25
12.	"Untitled"	1:43

== Personnel ==
Crash Test Dummies

- Benjamin Darvill – harmonicas, mandolin, acoustic guitar
- Michel Dorge – drums, percussion
- Ellen Reid – piano, keyboards, accordion, backing vocals
- Brad Roberts – lead vocals, acoustic and electric guitars, piano on "Untitled"
- Dan Roberts – bass guitars, synth bass, backing vocals

Additional musicians

- Larry Beers – drums on "Afternoons & Coffeespoons", "In the Days of the Caveman", and "When I Go Out with Artists"
- Adrian Belew – synthesized guitars on "God Shuffled His Feet"
- Kerry Nation – backing vocals on "Afternoons & Coffeespoons"

== Charts ==
=== Weekly charts ===
Weekly chart performance for God Shuffled His Feet
Chart (1993–94)	Peak position
Australian Albums (ARIA)	5
Austrian Albums (Ö3 Austria)	1
Canadian Albums (The Record)	11
Canada Top Albums/CDs (RPM)	17
Dutch Albums (Album Top 100)	6
European Albums (European Top 100 Albums)	2
Finnish Albums (Suomen virallinen lista)	1
German Albums (Offizielle Top 100)	1
Italian Albums (Musica e Dischi)	15
Hungarian Albums (MAHASZ)	39
New Zealand Albums (RMNZ)	1
Norwegian Albums (VG-lista)	3
Swedish Albums (Sverigetopplistan)	2
Swiss Albums (Schweizer Hitparade)	4
UK Albums (Official Charts)	2
US Billboard 200	9

=== Year-end charts ===
1994 year-end chart performance for God Shuffled His Feet
Chart (1994)	Position
Australian Albums (ARIA)	38
Austrian Albums (Ö3 Austria)	8
Canada Top Albums/CDs (RPM)	94
Dutch Albums (Album Top 100)	31
European Albums (European Top 100 Albums)	8
German Albums (Offizielle Top 100)	4
Icelandic Albums (Tónlist)	20
New Zealand Albums (RMNZ)	11
Swedish Albums & Compilations (Sverigetopplistan)	22
Swiss Albums (Schweizer Hitparade)	7
UK Albums (OCC)	50
US Billboard 200	53

== Certifications ==
Sale certifications for God Shuffled His Feet
Region	Certification	Certified units/sales
Australia (ARIA)	Platinum	70,000^{^}
Austria (IFPI Austria)	Gold	25,000^{*}
Canada (Music Canada)	3× Platinum	300,000^{^}
Finland (Musiikkituottajat)	Gold	37,908
Germany (BVMI)	Platinum	500,000^{^}
Netherlands (NVPI)	Gold	50,000^{^}
Norway (IFPI Norway)	2× Platinum	100,000^{*}
Sweden (GLF)	Platinum	100,000^{^}
Switzerland (IFPI Switzerland)	Gold	25,000^{^}
United Kingdom (BPI)	Gold	100,000^{^}
United States (RIAA)	2× Platinum	2,000,000^{^}
^{*} Sales figures based on certification alone.^{^} Shipments figures based on certification alone.
