= Get You in the Morning =

Single by Crash Test Dummies

from the album Give Yourself a Hand
- Released: June 1999
- Recorded: Rocket Carousel Studios, One on One South and David Abell Piano Studio, Los Angeles
- Genre: Trip hop; pop
- Label: BMG; ViK. Recordings
- Songwriter(s): Brad Roberts; Greg Wells
- Producer(s): Greg Wells

Crash Test Dummies singles chronology
"Keep a Lid on Things" (1999)	"Get You in the Morning" (1999)	"Every Morning" (2001)

"Get You in the Morning" is a song by Canadian group Crash Test Dummies and was the second and final single from their 1999 album Give Yourself a Hand. This song is one of three songs to feature Ellen Reid on lead vocals.

== Track listing ==
1. Get You In The Morning [Radio Edit]
2. Party's Over
3. Get You In The Morning [Extended Remix]

== Music video ==
The music video for the song features Ellen Reid switching to various TV stations featuring the rest of the band doing various random acts.

== Charts ==
Chart (1999)	Peak Position
Canadian Singles Chart	45
