= Music Pets Love: While You Are Gone =

Studio album by Bradley Joseph
- Released: October 1, 2004
- Genre: Instrumental; Adult contemporary Easy listening
- Length: 60:32
- Label: Robbins Island
- Producer: Bradley Joseph

Bradley Joseph chronology
The Journey Continues (2003)	Music Pets Love: While You Are Gone (2004)	The Road Ahead (2004)

Music Pets Love: While You Are Gone is a specialty CD by Bradley Joseph on the Robbins Island Music label. It was released in 2004 and has evolved into a series of CD/DVD projects made up of instrumental music mixed with short stories and soft animal and nature sounds designed to create a peaceful environment for pets who are left alone or for the owner who needs quiet time. These projects began when he noticed reactions to certain types of music by his own pets. "I finally have solid proof that I don't take life too seriously", says Joseph.

John P. Olsen of New Age Music World writes that: "The selection of CD and DVD pet therapy music produced by Bradley Joseph is designed specifically for pampering our companions using gentle music as a technique for relaxation and to help relieve separation anxiety while we are away, and additional common pet conditions. The benefits of music therapy are in fact supported by the veterinary profession..."

Albums in the collection include:

- Music Pets Love: While You Are Gone (CD) (2004)
- Music Dogs Love: While You Are Gone (CD) (2007)
- Music Cats Love: While You Are Gone (CD) (2007)
- Music Birds Love: While You Are Gone (CD) (2008)
- Music Pets Love: The Holiday Edition (While You Are Gone) (CD) (2008)
- DVD for Dogs: While You Are Gone (2007)
- DVD for Cats: While You Are Gone (2007)

== Track listing ==
1. "Pet Reflections"
2. "Dreams"
3. "Wet Kisses"
4. "New Leash On Life"
5. "On The Move"
6. "Peaceful Slumber"
7. "Unexpected Treasures"
8. "Basking In The Sun"
9. "Unconditional Love"
10. "Favorite Spot"
11. "Coming Home"

== Personnel ==
- All music composed, produced, and performed by Bradley Joseph.
- Art and Design – Tony Horning
- Portrait Photography – Buck Holzemer
