= Midnight Garden =

Studio album by Brad Roberts and Rob Morsberger
- Released: September 13, 2012
- Genre: Rock, pop
- Length: 32:59
- Label: Hieroglyph Records

Brad Roberts chronology
Rajanaka: Mantra (2011)	Midnight Garden (2012)

Midnight Garden is a collaborative album between Brad Roberts of the Crash Test Dummies and singer-songwriter Rob Morsberger.

== Background ==
Morsberger developed serious headaches in 2011 that would eventually be diagnosed as a brain tumor. After Morsberger received surgery for the terminal brain tumor, he was motivated to create as much music as possible before his death. Midnight Garden would be the second project he would complete before his death. The premiere performance of the song cycle would be at a benefit concert raising money for Morsberger's family and his medical expenses.

== Composition ==
The origins of the album were an unused "pile of lyrics" written by Brad Roberts. The music, composed by Morsberger, is a traditional song cycle scored for string quartet and piano, with Morsberger and Roberts performing vocals. The song cycle was inspired by Franz Schubert, Stephen Foster, and Gilbert and Sullivan, resulting in a combination of classical and popular music.

== Track listing ==
All tracks are written by Brad Roberts and Rob Morsberger

No.	Title	Length
1.	"He Heard a Melody"	2:33
2.	"Midnight Garden"	2:57
3.	"Venus Flytrap"	2:53
4.	"Nail It Down"	2:20
5.	"The Man and the Birds"	2:58
6.	"Don't Mistake My Charity"	2:49
7.	"The Breeze"	3:02
8.	"Faith nor Doubt"	2:19
9.	"At the Ledge"	3:21
10.	"Dead Ahead"	2:59
11.	"All the Songs Have Been Written"	4:48
