= Christmas Around the World =

Studio album by Bradley Joseph
- Released: October 31, 2000
- Genre: Instrumental; Adult contemporary Easy listening Christmas music
- Length: 50:55
- Label: Robbins Island
- Producer: Bradley Joseph

Bradley Joseph chronology
Solo Journey (1999)	Christmas Around the World (2000)	One Deep Breath (2002)

Christmas Around the World is Bradley Joseph's fourth album reaching NAV's top 100 radio playlist.

"In a thousand different ways, people join together every year to celebrate Christmas with their own unique customs and traditions. Pianist Bradley Joseph has hand-picked songs from around the world and recreated them with his own unique style. Each melody contains history and meaning that has endured for centuries."

== Critical reception ==
In a review for Wind and Wire Magazine, Michael Debbage writes, "Jules Verne took his characters Around The World In Eighty Days. However, musician Bradley Joseph takes us around the world in one play of this 51-minute-long CD. Partially a conceptual project, Joseph presents World Christmas melodies that have endured for centuries making this a unique Christmas project that allows you to enjoy it all year long." While Debbage believes the concept clearly supports the continued "ambitious talents of this creative and warm musician", he does not think this album quite meets the high standard that is associated with Bradley Joseph, stating, "the concept is offset by a limited thin and sparse production", "...most evident via the upbeat 'Hark! The Herald Angels Sing' that includes "poor use of loops and drum machines".

Professional ratings
Review scores
Source	Rating
Wind and Wire Magazine	(not rated)

"Far Away on Christmas Day"

"Hark! The Herald Angels Sing"

"A Minnesota Snowfall"

Debbage does go on to say that Joseph's stronger arrangements are via the less traditional ventures evident via the exotic Mexican-rooted carol "Riu, Riu Ciu" and the self-penned "Far Away On Christmas Day". "The latter shows influences of the fluid and flowing Bradley Joseph I have come to know and love", states Debbage. The only other self-penned composition is "A Minnesota Snowfall" that reflects a more "naked bare-boned ballad approach".

== Track listing ==
1. "Quickly on To Bethlehem" (Przybiezeli do Betlejem) – Poland
2. "God Rest Ye Merry, Gentlemen" – England
3. "Ríu, Ríu Chíu" – Mexico
4. "Sheep Fast Asleep" (Hitsuji wa Nemureri) – Japan
5. "I Am So Glad Each Christmas Eve" (Jeg er glad hver Julekveld) – Norway
6. "Far Away On Christmas Day" – USA
7. "Praise The Lord O My Soul" – Russia
8. "Silent Night" (Stille Nacht) – Austria
9. "Joy To The World" – Germany
10. "He Is Born" (IL est ne) – France
11. "A Minnesota Snowfall" – USA
12. "Hark! The Herald Angels Sing" – Germany

(History of each song: Christmas_Traditions)

== Personnel ==
- All music arranged and performed by Bradley Joseph.
- Art and Design – Tony Horning
- Photography – Erin Horning
