= Swimming in Your Ocean =

1994 single by Crash Test Dummies

Single by Crash Test Dummies

from the album God Shuffled His Feet
- Released: January 1994
- Length: 3:49
- Label: Arista; BMG
- Songwriter: Brad Roberts
- Producers: Jerry Harrison; Crash Test Dummies

Crash Test Dummies singles chronology
"Mmm Mmm Mmm Mmm" (1993)	"Swimming in Your Ocean" (1994)	"Afternoons & Coffeespoons" (1994)

"Swimming in Your Ocean" is a song by Canadian folk-rock group Crash Test Dummies and was the second single from their 1993 album God Shuffled His Feet. The song reached number six in Canada and topped the Canadian Adult Contemporary chart for three weeks. It was also popular in Iceland, reaching number 10 on the Icelandic Singles Chart.

== Music video ==
The music video features Crash Test Dummies as a lounge band performing to a group of old women.

== Charts ==
=== Weekly charts ===
Weekly chart performance for "Swimming in Your Ocean"
Chart (1994)	Peak position
Australia (ARIA)	118
Canada Top Singles (RPM)	6
Canada Adult Contemporary (RPM)	1
Canada CHR (The Record)	2
Iceland (Íslenski Listinn Topp 40)	10

=== Year-end charts ===
Year-end chart performance for "Swimming in Your Ocean"
Chart (1994)	Position
Canada Top Singles (RPM)	46
Canada Adult Contemporary (RPM)	9
