= Give In =

Studio album by On An On
- Released: 29 January 2013
- Recorded: Toronto, 2012
- Genre: Indie rock, dream pop, shoegaze
- Label: Roll Call Records, City Slang
- Producer: Dave Newfeld

On An On chronology
Give In (2013)	And the Wave Has Two Sides (2015)

Singles from Give In
- 1. "The Hunter" Released: 14 November 2012; 2. "Ghosts" Released: 4 December 2012

Give In is the debut album by American dream pop band On An On, released on Roll Call Records and City Slang on 29 January 2013. The album has been described as "haunting yet beautifully bare".

== Background ==
=== Writing and recording ===
Nate Eiesland, Alissa Ricci and Ryne Estwing came together in the spring of 2012 to form a new band and record new material after the dissolution of their previous band, Scattered Trees. A three-week-long Scattered Trees recording session had been previously booked, so the trio decided to proceed and record in Toronto with producer Dave Newfeld. The threesome decided to "dismantle" the final songs they had written for Scattered Trees and to write a fresh batch in the studio. Singer Nate Eiesland described producer Newfeld as "a mad genius. His guidance was less about new sounds and more about new perspectives on how to make a record". Newfeld encouraged the band to experience recording from the exploration and experimentation side, rather than being solely about performance and getting perfect takes.

=== Musical style and influences ===
After working within the confines of a traditional rock band dynamic in Scattered Trees, On An On incorporated electronic elements into their songwriting for Give In. They utilised "all of these really old drum machines that Dave Newfeld had" and live drummer Tony Nesbitt-Larking was brought in to record on the album.

=== Themes ===
Keyboardist Alissa Ricci stated that the band were so excited to record an album that they didn't enter into the process with any preconceived statements or themes and themes which emerged during the writing process were "relationships, the tough things, the great things, death, pain, ambivalence and apathy". The death of principal writer Nate Eiesland's father during the making of the final Scattered Trees record the previous year continued to affect him during the making of Give In, with his lyrics reflecting a "more of an ambivalent attitude towards death, unlike the first stage of grief". "The Hunter" deals with Eiesland's "level of familiarity and understanding of death". Ryne Estwing revealed that the album title Give In is "another way of saying don’t give up".

== Critical reception ==
Professional ratings
Review scores
Source	Rating
AbsolutePunk	9/10 stars
Consequence of Sound	3/5 stars
PopMatters	7/10 stars

Music review aggregator Metacritic gives the album a score of 81, based on four reviews. The band's sound drew comparisons to Beach House, Yeasayer and Awolnation.

== Track listing ==
No.	Title	Length
1.	"Ghosts"	5:07
2.	"Every Song"	3:36
3.	"American Dream"	3:14
4.	"The Hunter"	3:17
5.	"All The Horses"	4:33
6.	"Bad Mythology"	3:07
7.	"War Is Gone"	4:24
8.	"Cops"	5:39
9.	"Panic"	4:00
10.	"I Wanted To Say More"	7:49
Total length:		41:23

== Personnel ==
- Nate Eiesland – vocals, guitar
- Alissa Ricci – keyboards
- Ryne Estwing – bass
- Tony Nesbitt-Larking – drums, percussion
- Dave Newfeld – mixing, production, mastering
