= Rajanaka: Mantra =

Studio album by Brad Roberts
- Released: 2011
- Recorded: VRTCL Entertainment, New York City
- Genre: New-age
- Length: 46:45
- Label: Deep Fried Records
- Producer: Terry Derkach

Brad Roberts chronology
Crash Test Dude (2001)	Rajanaka: Mantra (2011)	Midnight Garden (2012)

Rajanaka: Mantra is an album by Brad Roberts, which consists of various mantras, accompanied to music. The album was released for purchase via online download.

== Track listing ==
1. "Shiva Bija"
2. "Om Namo Ganapataye"
3. "By Any & All Means"
4. "Between the Reeds"
5. "The Wonderful Destroyer"
6. "La Litra"
7. "Invocation"
8. "Twisted Trunk"

== Download Sites ==
- Rajanaka-Mantra.com
