= Piano Love Songs =

Studio album by Bradley Joseph
- Released: November 1, 2006
- Genre: Instrumental; Adult contemporary Easy listening
- Length: 63:16
- Label: Robbins Island
- Producer: Bradley Joseph

Bradley Joseph chronology
For the Love of It (2005)	Piano Love Songs (2006)	Hymns and Spiritual Songs (2007)

Piano Love Songs is the 13th studio album released by Bradley Joseph on the Robbins Island Music label.

== Track listing ==
1. "The Way You Look Tonight" – Writers: Jerome Kern, Dorothy Fields – 4:45
2. "Unforgettable" – Writer: Irving Gordon – 4:32
3. "The First Time Ever I Saw Your Face" – Writer: Ewan MacColl – 4:30
4. "Fields of Gold" – Writer: Sting – 4:05
5. "I Got You Babe" (Sonny and Cher) – Writer: Sonny Bono – 4:50
6. "You Are So Beautiful" – Writers: Billy Preston, Bruce Fisher – 4:05
7. "Moon River" – Writers: – Henry Mancini, Johnny Mercer – 4:58
8. "My Funny Valentine" – Writers: Lorenz Hart, Richard Rodgers – 5:36
9. "The Wedding Song (There is Love)" – Writer: Noel Stookey – 4:30
10. "Moonlight Sonata" (Beethoven / (classical) – Arranger: Bradley Joseph – 6:49
11. "Forever I Do" – Writer: Bradley Joseph – 3:54
12. "For Your Eyes Only" (Sheena Easton) – Writer: Bill Conti – 4:58
13. "Canon in D (Pachelbel / (classical) – Arranger: Bradley Joseph – 5:16

"The Wedding Song (There is Love)"

"Forever I Do"

== Personnel ==
- All music arranged and performed by Bradley Joseph.
- Art and Design – Tony Horning
- Portrait Photography – J. Dunn
