= Jeanette Clinger =

American singer/vocalist

- Born: United States
- Occupation: Singer

Jeanette Clinger, is an American singer/vocalist who has toured and/or recorded with such artists as Kim Carnes, Bradley Joseph, Hiroshima, Sheena Easton, Julie Brown, Donovan, and Yanni for whom she is featured on the live concert video and album Tribute. She is a published children’s fantasy book author. The Crystal Prince, screen play under the same name, Dream Maker Pictures and Books, and original sound track for the book and movie, Love Is The Only Way.

== Career ==
In 1992, Clinger joined the band Hiroshima as a vocalist.
