= For the Love of It (album) =

Studio album by Bradley Joseph
- Released: November 1, 2005
- Genre: Instrumental; Adult contemporary Easy listening
- Length: 58:21
- Label: Robbins Island
- Producer: Bradley Joseph

Bradley Joseph chronology
In the Heart of Everyone (2004)	For the Love of It (2005)	Piano Love Songs (2006)

For the Love of It is the 12th studio album released by Bradley Joseph on the Robbins Island Music label (see 2005 in music).

"Before world tours and recording studios there was a time when Bradley Joseph played piano just 'For The Love Of It'. He grew up listening to, learning, and performing these classic melodies. Recorded for the first time by Bradley, these are some of his favorite songs."

("Robbins Island", "The Gallery", and "Blue Rock Road" written by Bradley Joseph).

== Track listing ==
1. "I'll Never Fall in Love Again" Writers: Burt Bacharach, Hal David – 4:52
2. "Theme from Willy Wonka & the Chocolate Factory" (Pure Imagination) Writers: Leslie Bricusse, Anthony Newley – 4:58
3. "Let It Be" (The Beatles) Writers: John Lennon, Paul McCartney – 4:38
4. "All I Know" (Art Garfunkel), Writer: Jimmy Webb – 4:06
5. "Theme from Tootsie" (It Might Be You) Writers: Dave Grusin, Alan Bergman, Marilyn Bergman – 4:58
6. "Adagio in G minor" (Albinoni) / classical) – 5:56
7. "Arthur's Theme (Best That You Can Do)" (From the movie Arthur) Writers: Peter Allen, Burt Bacharach, Christopher Cross, Carole Bayer Sager – 4:52
8. "We've Only Just Begun" (The Carpenters) Writers: Paul Williams, Roger Nichols – 4:58
9. "Mandy" (Barry Manilow) Writers: Scott English, Richard Kerr – 4:50
10. "Fur Elise" (Beethoven / (classical) – 6:28
- Includes 3 bonus tracks:
1. "Robbins Island" – Composer: Bradley Joseph – 4:12
2. "The Gallery" – Composer: Bradley Joseph – 4:44
3. "Blue Rock Road" – Composer: Bradley Joseph – 3:22

== Personnel ==
- All music arranged and performed by Bradley Joseph.
- Art and Design – Tony Horning
- Portrait Photography – J. Dunn
