= Hymns and Spiritual Songs (album) =

Studio album by Bradley Joseph
- Released: June 1, 2007
- Genre: Christian; Instrumental; Adult contemporary Easy listening
- Length: 55:00
- Label: Robbins Island
- Producer: Bradley Joseph

Bradley Joseph chronology
| Piano Love Songs (2006) | Hymns and Spiritual Songs (2007) | Classic Christmas (2008) |

Hymns and Spiritual Songs is the 14th studio album released by Bradley Joseph on the Robbins Island Music label.

== Track listing ==
1. "We Gather Together" – 4:55
2. "O Holy Night" – 5:39
3. "Amazing Grace" – 4:22
4. "Ave Maria (Schubert) – 6:02
5. "All Things Bright & Beautiful" – 2:28
6. "Holy, Holy, Holy, Lord God Almighty" – 3:28
7. "O Come, O Come, Emmanuel" – 2:36
8. "Sweet Hour of Prayer" – 4:16
9. "Praise to the Lord, the Almighty" – 3:08
10. "How Great Thou Art" – 4:02
11. "Great is Thy Faithfulness" – 3:42
12. "Rock of Ages" – 3:47
13. "A Mighty Fortress is our God" – 3:30
14. "Joyful, Joyful (Ode to Joy)" – 2:50

"Amazing Grace"

"Ave Maria"

== Personnel ==
- All music arranged and performed by Bradley Joseph.
- Portrait photography: J. Dunn
- Art and Design: Tony Horning
