= Gifts from Enola =

American band

Gifts From Enola
- Origin: Harrisonburg, Virginia, USA
- Genres: Post-rock; Experimental
- Years active: 2005 - 2013, 2019
- Labels: The Mylene Sheath; Differential Records
- Members: Andrew Barnes; Nathaniel Dominy; CJ DeLuca; Jud Mason
- Past members: Jordan Endahl; Tim Skirven
- Website: Myspace

Gifts From Enola was a four-piece post-rock band from Harrisonburg, Virginia. Their music is characterized with a strong riff-orientated guitar sound along with the soft-loud approach prevalent in some post-rock. They have released three full-length albums and a split album. In July 2010, the band released their self-titled third full-length album. The name supposedly references the Enola Gay, the first aircraft to drop a nuclear bomb.

== History ==
Gifts From Enola was formed by friends Andrew Barnes and Nate Dominy while they were in their freshman year of college in late 2005. After starting to perform and record in 2006, they added CJ DeLuca and Jordan Endahl to the lineup and recorded their first album Loyal Eyes Betrayed the Mind which they self-released later that year. Loyal Eyes was commercially well received, and led to them being named 'pick of the month' for September 2006 by the prominent music website TheSilentBallet.com. In 2007 they went on their first U.S. tour, which increased national awareness of the band.

Gifts From Enola were one of the first bands to be signed by the influential indie record label The Mylene Sheath. In March 2008 Gifts From Enola released a split album with the post-rock band You.May.Die.In.The.Desert, which was titled Harmonic Motion Vol. 1 and was released nationwide through Differential Records. This was followed by a vinyl re-release of Loyal Eyes Betrayed the Mind by The Mylene Sheath on 3 June 2008. The re-release was a vinyl exclusive limited to 500 copies: 100 on clear vinyl with black and blue splatter available exclusively from the band at concerts, 150 on clear vinyl with gray haze and clear with white haze available exclusively from The Mylene Sheath webstore, and 250 on gray vinyl. Both of the exclusive versions sold out very quickly and the re-release cemented the band as a stalwart of the emerging post-rock genre. The release of both these albums increased both national and international appreciation of the band.

Immediately after releasing Harmonic Motion Vol. 1, the band started writing and recording material for their next album. The band took a break from recording during the summer of 2008 to go on a nationwide tour of the United States before returning to the studio to finish recording in late 2008. The results of these efforts were released by The Mylene Sheath on June 23, 2009, and titled From Fathoms. As with most other Mylene Sheath releases, From Fathoms was released on limited edition colored vinyl as well as on CD. The album was limited to 500 copies on 2xLP and 2000 on CD. The vinyl colors were 100 in swamp green/translucent ice blue swirl and translucent orange/brown swirl, which was available exclusively through the band on their supporting tour, 100 translucent deep blue and translucent forest green available exclusively from The Mylene Sheath webstore, and 300 on half swamp green and half opaque navy blue. As with the re-release of Loyal Eyes Betrayed the Mind, the exclusive versions sold out very quickly. The album was critically hailed and received positive reviews.

In March 2009 Jud Mason replaced Jordan on drums and the band added Tim Skirven on keyboards. The release of From Fathoms was accompanied with a nine-week nationwide tour during which the band traveled around the country on a school bus converted to run on waste vegetable oil. In late 2009 Tim left and the band returned to having four members. In the lead-up to the release of their third album, they played a series of shows in the U.S., including three sold-out shows at SXSW, the world-renowned independent music festival, one of which was a label showcase for The Mylene Sheath and featured labelmates Junius and Caspian, as well as other shows in the area with bands such as If These Trees Could Talk. In June 2010 pre-orders for the third full-length album by the band went on sale at The Mylene Sheath. The album was titled Gifts From Enola and, as with most Mylene Sheath releases, was released on limited edition in vinyl and CD formats. The vinyl was limited to 500 copies, 100 in baby blue available exclusively from the label online store, 300 on opaque orange vinyl, and 100 on orange splatter vinyl available only from the band at concerts. The continued appeal of the band was visible by the fact that the baby blue version of the album sold out within hours of being put up for pre-order.

In 2010, the band released a full-length album titled Gifts From Enola, and embarked on a supporting tour of the U.S., Europe and Japan. The band released A Healthy Fear in November 2012.

On April 3, 2013, the band announced via their web site that after 7 years they'd be putting the band "to sleep". Six years later, Gifts From Enola had a two reunion shows in Belgium on dunk!fest and US in Saint Vitus bar.

== Discography ==
Year	Title	Format	Label
2006	Loyal Eyes Betrayed the Mind	CD	Self-released
2008	Harmonic Motion Vol.1	CD	Differential Records
2008	Loyal Eyes Betrayed the Mind	2xLP	The Mylene Sheath
2009	From Fathoms	CD/2xLP	The Mylene Sheath
2010	Gifts from Enola	CD/LP	The Mylene Sheath
2012	A Healthy Fear	CD/LP	The Mylene Sheath
2019	From Fathoms (remastered)	CD/LP	Dunk! Records
