= Keep a Lid on Things =

Single by Crash Test Dummies

from the album Give Yourself a Hand
- Released: January 1999
- Recorded: Rocket Carousel Studios, One on One South and David Abell Piano Studio, Los Angeles
- Genre: Trip hop; downtempo
- Length: 2:44
- Label: BMG; ViK. Recordings
- Songwriters: Brad Roberts; Greg Wells
- Producer: Greg Wells

Crash Test Dummies singles chronology
"My Own Sunrise" (1997)	"Keep a Lid on Things" (1999)	"Get You in the Morning" (1999)

"Keep a Lid on Things" is a song by Canadian group Crash Test Dummies and was the first single from their 1999 album Give Yourself a Hand. The song featured a new sound for the group, most notably Brad Roberts using falsetto vocals. The song is featured in the 1998 film Dog Park.

== Track listing ==
Lyrics written by Brad Roberts. Music written by Brad Roberts and Greg Wells.

1. "Keep a Lid on Things" - 2:44
2. "Filter Queen" - 2:55
3. "Handy Candyman" - 3:00

== Music video ==
The music video for the song features Brad Roberts driving robot versions of the band and having to leave on a jetpack to locate a new battery. The video was filmed in Toronto in December 1998. The video premiered on MuchMusic on February 8, 1999.

== Charts ==
=== Weekly charts ===
Chart (1999)	Peak Position
Australia (ARIA)	103
RPM Canadian Singles Chart	5
US Adult Alternative Airplay (Billboard)	6

=== Year-end charts ===
Chart (1999)	Position
Canada Top Singles (RPM)	27
