= The Ballads (group) =

- Also known as: The Ballards
- Origin: Oakland, California
- Genres: R&B
- Labels: Venture

The Ballads were an American vocal group formed in 1961 in Oakland. Band members included Nathaniel Romerson, Jon Foster, Rico Thompson, and Leslie LaPalmer The band had one hit single in 1968, entitled "God Bless Our Love". This song reached #65 on the Billboard pop singles charts and #8 on the R&B Singles charts. This song was picked by WDIA program director Bill Thomas as a "Biggest Leftfield Happening" in Billboard's programming aids. The B side of this record was the song "My Baby Knows How to Love Her Man." This record was released on Venture Records #615.

Nathaniel "Nate" Romerson (born on October 26, 1937) died on April 22, 2013, at the age of 75. He started the group in 1961, and he was also one of the background singers.
