= Solo Journey =

Studio album by Bradley Joseph
- Released: October 18, 1999
- Genre: Instrumental; Adult contemporary Easy listening
- Length: 40:53
- Label: Robbins Island
- Producer: Bradley Joseph

Bradley Joseph chronology
Rapture (1997)	Solo Journey (1999)	Christmas Around the World (2000)

Solo Journey is Bradley Joseph's third album and first album on his own record label, Robbins Island Music.

== History ==
Having previously recorded on the Narada label and admitting it was a great experience music-wise, Joseph didn't like the lack of control over the end product, and asked to be released from his contract. He started Robbins Island Music in 1998, composing, producing, and distributing his own recordings. Hence, Solo Journey was released in 1999, composed of eleven soft piano compositions. While Joseph's first two releases, Hear the Masses and Rapture, employ mainly orchestral compositions and arrangements, this album features Joseph on soft solo piano and is characterized as being a "scaled down introspective, ... and while simplistic was still breath-taking", by Michael Debbage of Wind and Wire Magazine. Joseph's goal for this album was to provide an "intimate and peaceful environment for the special times we all encounter in our lives". Reviewing for Solo Piano Publications, Kathy Parsons calls it a "beautiful musical excursion", "...inviting the listener to kick back and relax for a while"; although, as a piano teacher, she opined that "most of the piano parts sound electronic", stating, "As good as the electronic pianos have gotten, they lack the warmth and richness of a great acoustic grand."

"The Long, Last Mile"
A composition that, "...starts out with a bittersweet melody, and then builds in intensity and complexity with cello, winds, and ethereal sounds intertwining around the piano. Then it breaks off, and the opening melody returns".

"Winter Moon"
A simple, straightforward melody with a gentle rhythm, states Kathy Parsons of Wind and Wire Magazine.

Parsons observes that "The Long, Last Mile" starts out with a bittersweet melody, and then builds in intensity and complexity with cello, winds, and ethereal sounds intertwining around the piano. Then it breaks off, and the opening melody returns. She describes "Winter Moon" as a simple, straightforward melody with a gentle rhythm; and "The Poetry Room" as almost minimalist in its simplicity, "also very beautiful". She goes on to say, "'The First Snow' gently describes the quiet but dazzling splendor of the first snow of the season. Joseph makes effective use of arpeggiated chords in the upper registers to depict the light dancing in sparkles.

In 2003, Joseph released a sequel to this album, The Journey Continues.

== Track listing ==
1. "Winter Moon" – 3:58
2. "Yesterday Is But A Dream" – 3:21
3. "The Poetry Room" – 3:20
4. "Letters From Home" – 2:30
5. "A Summer's Story" – 3:41
6. "The Long, Last Mile" – 4:05
7. "October Forest" – 5:15
8. "The First Snow" – 2:10
9. "Season's End" – 5:08
10. "Wind Farmer (piano version)" – 4:15
11. "Love Remains" – 1:58

== Personnel ==
- All music composed, produced, performed by Bradley Joseph.
- Art and Design – Tony Horning
- Portrait Photography – Buck Holzemer

== Sheet Music ==
Joseph has published sheet music for all eleven compositions from Solo Journey ranging from easy/intermediate to intermediate/advanced, with some compositions transposed to easier key signatures. Transcribed by Steve Trochlil.
