= On An On =

American indie rock band

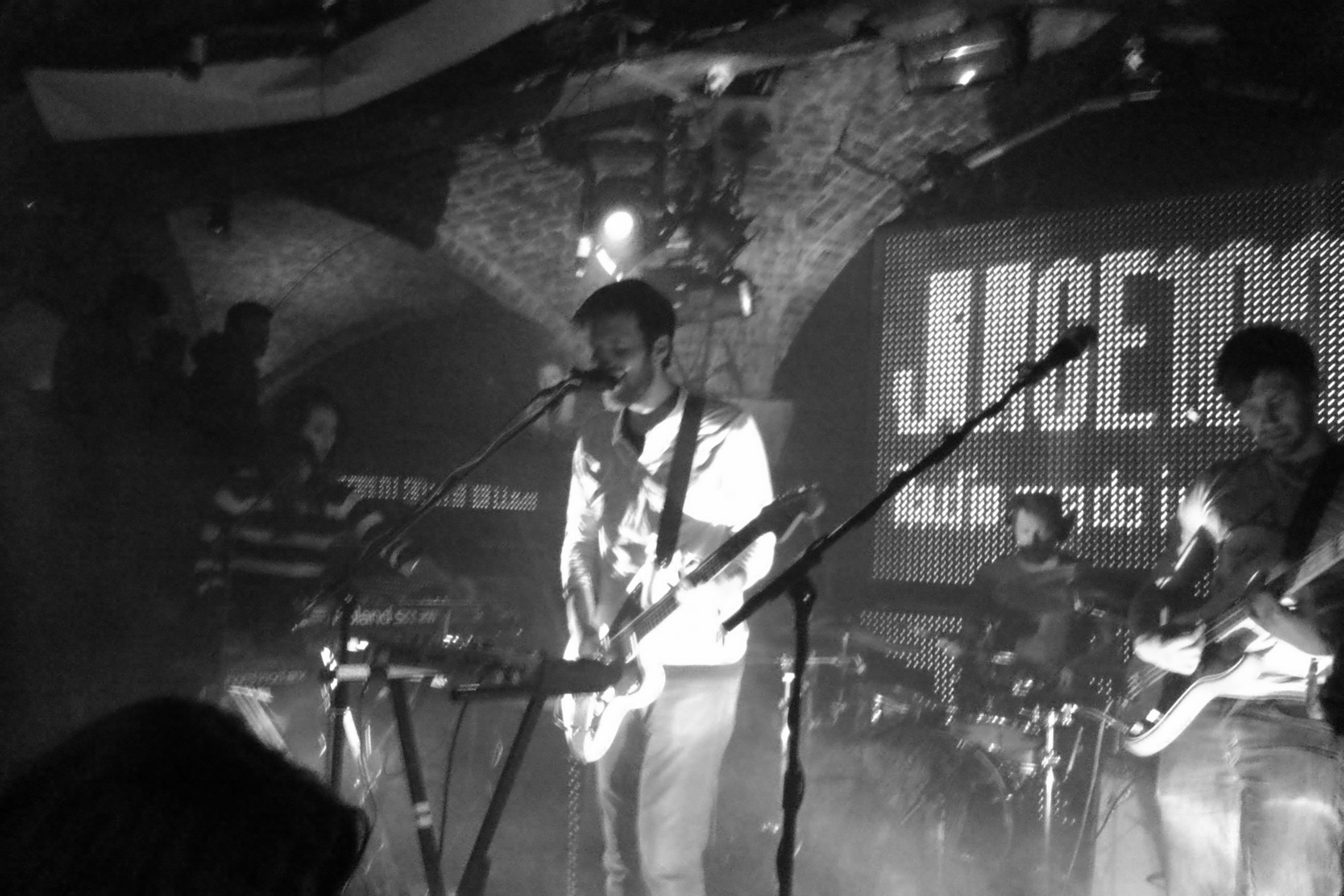
- Brighton, 2013

Background information
- Origin: Minneapolis, Minnesota, United States
- Genres: Indie rock, dream pop, shoegaze
- Years active: 2012–2016 (hiatus)
- Labels: Roll Call Records, City Slang, Tugboat Records, P-Vine Records
- Members: Nate Eiesland; Alissa Ricci; Ryne Estwing
- Website: itsonanon.com

On An On (usually stylised as ON AN ON) is an American indie rock band, based in Minneapolis, Minnesota. The band was formed by Nate Eiesland, Alissa Ricci and Ryne Estwing after the dissolution of their previous band, Scattered Trees, in 2012. On An On released their debut album Give In in 2013 and their second album And the Wave Has Two Sides was released in July 2015. The band went on hiatus in 2016.

== History ==
=== Give In (2012–2013) ===
On An On was formed by Scattered Trees members Nate Eiesland, Alissa Ricci and Ryne Estwing in March 2012. The threesome discussed the idea of reforming Scattered Trees, but decided to go with the risk and excitement of forming a new band. The trio utilised a previously-booked three-week block of studio time to work on new material with producer Dave Newfeld in Toronto. The three were tired of the more traditional songwriting and recording methods they had used in Scattered Trees and followed their desire to use electronic elements and drum machines. Producer Newfeld focused on helping the band capture moments of spontaneity and emotion, rather than perfection. Nate Eiesland later revealed that his writing was a reaction to touring Scattered Trees' 2011 album Sympathy, during which he "left the stage every night on the verge of tears. The songs I wrote after that time were born from a new perspective I had on death, something stronger and less afraid". Themes present on the album are relationships, death, pain, ambivalence and apathy. The album's title, Give In, was summed up by Eiesland: "we wanted to capture on tape a moment of finding something new that works and in doing that, you have to give in to the process and be willing to put yourself out there".

The band signed recording and distribution deals with Roll Call Records (North America), City Slang (UK/Europe), Tugboat and P-Vine Records (Japan). In late August 2012, the band made their first song available for streaming, "Ghosts". After augmenting their lineup with a live touring drummer, they embarked on their first tour the following month, playing alongside Reptar and Rubblebucket. The band made "The Hunter" and "Ghosts" singles available for download in November and December respectively, before beginning their tour supporting the album in January 2013, supporting Geographer. Give In was released during the tour on 29 January. Music review aggregator Metacritic gives the album a score of 81, based on four reviews. The band embarked on their first European tour in February and would perform a second European tour and two further North American tours before wrapping their promotion for Give In in mid-November 2013. The band released the "Boy from School" / "Unison" cover single mid-tour on 20 August.

=== And the Wave Has Two Sides (2013–2016) ===
The band began writing their second album while touring Give In during 2013. Recording began with producer Joe Chiccarelli and engineer David Schwerkolt at Sunset Sound in Los Angeles in mid-September 2014 and wrapped three months later. On 6 January 2015, the band revealed the album would be titled And the Wave Has Two Sides. In late February, the first song from the album was made available for download, "Drifting". After adding an additional live guitarist to their touring lineup, the band embarked on their first tour supporting the album in late March 2015, alongside Big Data and Chappo. In late April, the album release date was revealed as 24 July 2015.

=== Hiatus (2016–present) ===
In June 2016, the band announced a final North American tour for July 2016 and its subsequent hiatus. In late August 2016, the band reassured fans that it had not broken up.

== Members ==
- Nate Eiesland – vocals, guitar
- Alissa Ricci – keyboards
- Ryne Estwing – bass

== Discography ==
=== Studio albums ===
- Give In (28 January 2013, Roll Call Records/City Slang/Tugboat Records/P-Vine Records)
- And the Wave Has Two Sides (24 July 2015, Roll Call Records/City Slang/Tugboat Records/P-Vine Records)

=== Other releases ===
- "The Hunter" (Download, 14 November 2012, Roll Call Records/City Slang/Tugboat Records/P-Vine Records)
- "Ghosts" (Download, 4 December 2012, Roll Call Records/City Slang/Tugboat Records/P-Vine Records)
- "Boy from School" / "Unison" (7"/download, 20 August 2013, Roll Call Records/City Slang/Tugboat Records/P-Vine Records))
- "Drifting" (Download, 27 February 2015, Roll Call Records/City Slang/Tugboat Records/P-Vine Records)

== See also ==
- Scattered Trees
