= Afternoons & Coffeespoons =

1994 single by Crash Test Dummies

Single by Crash Test Dummies

from the album God Shuffled His Feet
- Released: June 1994
- Length: 3:53
- Label: Arista
- Songwriter: Brad Roberts
- Producer: Jerry Harrison

Crash Test Dummies singles chronology
"Swimming in Your Ocean" (1994)	"Afternoons & Coffeespoons" (1994)	"God Shuffled His Feet" (1994)

Music video
- "Afternoons & Coffeespoons" on YouTube

"Afternoons & Coffeespoons" is a song by Canadian rock band Crash Test Dummies, released by Arista Records in June 1994, as the third single from the band's 1993 album God Shuffled His Feet. "Afternoons & Coffeespoons" has been called the band's most popular song amongst fans. It is also one of their most successful songs commercially, peaking at number two in Iceland, number seven in Canada, number 16 in Finland, and number 66 in the United States. The accompanying music video was directed by Tim Hamilton.

== Background ==
The title and lyrics of the song reference the 1915 T. S. Eliot poem "The Love Song of J. Alfred Prufrock". Lead vocalist Brad Roberts called it "a song about being afraid of getting old, which is a reflection of my very neurotic character".

== Critical reception ==
Upon the release of the single, Larry Flick from Billboard magazine called it "another winner" for the band, writing that although it did not live up to the catchiness of "Mmm Mmm Mmm Mmm", it was a "very hummable" song. Martin Aston from Music Week gave it a score of four out of five, naming it "another strong melody, another hummable chorus, another Top 10 hit." Emma Cochrane from Smash Hits gave it three out of five, writing, "Unfortunately this single hasn't got a great hook like "Mmm Mmm Mmm Mmm". Radio One love them because they fit into their new adult rock sound."

== Music video ==
The music video for "Afternoons & Coffeespoons" was directed by Tim Hamilton and features Brad Roberts as a patient in a hospital, with the rest of the band playing the doctors operating on him. A bored Grim Reaper passes the time smoking, talking on his cellphone and watching the other patients as he waits for him to expire. The video ends with Roberts getting discharged, with a choreographed wheelchair dance on the hospital helipad.

== Charts ==
=== Weekly charts ===
Weekly chart performance for "Afternoons & Coffeespoons"
Chart (1994)	Peak position
Australia (ARIA)	40
Belgium (Ultratop 50 Flanders)	42
Canada Top Singles (RPM)	7
Canada Adult Contemporary (RPM)	4
Europe (Eurochart Hot 100)	57
Europe (European AC Radio)	11
Europe (European Hit Radio)	13
Finland (Suomen virallinen lista)	16
Germany (GfK)	39
Iceland (Íslenski Listinn Topp 40)	2
Ireland (IRMA)	23
Netherlands (Single Top 100 Tip)	3
New Zealand (Recorded Music NZ)	41
Scottish Singles Sales (Official Charts)	17
UK Singles (Official Charts)	23
UK Airplay (Music Week)	19
US Billboard Hot 100	66
US Alternative Airplay (Billboard)	13
US Cash Box Top 100	39

=== Year-end charts ===
Year-end chart performance for "Afternoons & Coffeespoons"
Chart (1994)	Position
Canada Top Singles (RPM)	65
Canada Adult Contemporary (RPM)	34
Iceland (Íslenski Listinn Topp 40)	27
