= Rob Morsberger =

American singer-songwriter

- Origin: Ohio
- Genres: Pop; Rock
- Occupations: Singer-songwriter, musician
- Instrument: Piano
- Years active: 2006–2013
- Website: robmorsberger.com

Robert E. "Rob" Morsberger (August 9, 1959 – June 2, 2013) was an American singer-songwriter and classically trained composer. As a sideman/arranger, his credits include Patti Smith, the Grammy-winning Boardwalk Empire soundtrack album, My Morning Jacket, Crash Test Dummies, Marshall Crenshaw, Willie Nile, Jules Shear, Loudon Wainwright III, and more.

== Personal life ==
Morsberger was born in Ohio, raised in Oxford, England and studied composition at the University of Edinburgh. He composed music for PBS programs including Masterpiece Theatre, NOVA and Frontline. He was composer for the award-winning PBS series NOVAscienceNOW for its first five seasons. Morsberger was diagnosed with grade 4 Glioblastoma in September 2011. After he was diagnosed with brain cancer he concentrated solely on his own career, including the 2012 albums A Part of You and Midnight Garden, the latter being a collaboration with his friend Brad Roberts of the Crash Test Dummies. He had been working on a documentary about living with terminal brain cancer.

=== Death ===
He died on June 2, 2013, at age 53. Prior to his death, he lived with his family in the Hudson Valley, just north of New York City.

== Discography ==
=== Solo ===
- A Periodic Rush of Waves (2006)
- The End of Physics (2008)
- Relativity Blues (2008)
- The Chronicle of A Literal Man (2010)
- Ghosts Before Breakfast (2011)
- A Part of You (2012)
- A Gesture and a Word (2013)

=== Collaborations ===
- Midnight Garden (with Brad Roberts)(2012)
