= Rapture (Bradley Joseph album) =

Studio album by Bradley Joseph
- Released: March 11, 1997
- Genre: New-age
- Length: 55:05
- Label: Narada
- Producer: Bradley Joseph

Bradley Joseph chronology
Hear the Masses (1994)	Rapture (1997)	Solo Journey (1999)

Rapture is the second album by Bradley Joseph, and his debut album on the Narada label, released in March 1997. This is an instrumental album in which Joseph wrote and conducted all of the scores. In addition to incorporating a core band including violinist Charlie Bisharat and drummer Charlie Adams, he used a 50-piece orchestra. It is an "expression of a life's work and dreams", featuring intimate piano pieces, quartets and full orchestrations, "combining smooth jazz with contemporary instrumental themes". It reached New Age Voice (NAV)'s "Airwaves Top 30" at No. 15 in July 1997.

== History ==
During his years of worldwide concert tours as keyboardist with Yanni and Sheena Easton, Bradley Joseph released his debut album, Hear the Masses in 1994. Subsequently, Joseph attracted the attention of Narada Productions via the World Wide Web. A representative for Narada came across Joseph's website and downloaded some music. This sparked their interest and resulted in signing Joseph to a multi-record deal.

The outcome was Rapture, Joseph's second album, which was recorded at a number of different studios including Captain and Tennille's studio in Los Angeles and Pachyderm Studio in Cannon Falls, Minnesota.

In addition to using a core band including Charlie Adams on percussion, Charlie Bisharat on violin and Steven Trochlil on clarinet, Joseph brought in a 50-piece orchestra and conducted and wrote all the scores. Michael Debbage of Wind and Wire magazine recalls, "It was the year 1997 and New Age music had already peaked commercially as the interest and exposure seemed to lag. The genres main labels – Narada, Windham Music, and Higher Octave – were beginning to explore worldly themes versus the warm, earthly, acoustic themes that prior artists had established. It appeared that the abundance of new artists was becoming a dying breed. An exception to the rule was Bradley Joseph, who released his first mainstream album Rapture to glorious reviews, and to this day it remains his tour de force."

Joseph used the Yamaha and Bösendorfer pianos for this album. He often references the past when he names his songs and his music is frequently reminiscent of his rural Minnesota roots. His company, Robbins Island Music, [and song] is named after a city park in Willmar, says Anne Polta of the West Central Tribune.

== Critical reception ==
Professional ratings
Review scores
Source	Rating
Allmusic	3/5 stars

Ken Moore of the Naples Daily News cites, "Joseph's music is backed by 15 talented musicians, some playing three or more different instruments that make up a symphony of sounds ranging from quietly pensive mood music to a rich orchestration of classical depth and breadth." It contains "...heavy flowing strings and emotion-filled keyboard melodies, as on 'A Lover's Return'", states the Johnson County Sun, while Ross Boissoneau of Allmusic contradicts saying, "...Joseph has a good ear for melody, but he pretty much refrains from Yanni's trademark sweeping, whooshing synth swells."

A review of Rapture from New Age Voice states, "Joseph is smooth, painting romantic pictures in sound with voices and instruments that escalate from quiet, intimate passages to big, energetic movements. The arrangements are structured so that the trumpet can lead a line out on 'Be Still' signaling an introspective sort of mood. Yet the strings swell on 'The Passage', engulfing the listener in an ocean of sound. Even cuts that start quiet, such as 'Healing the Hollow Man' or 'Blue Rock Road' ebb and flow between quiet moments and crescendos."

John Blake of The Atlanta Journal notes that often New Age music sounds as if it should be played in a supermarket. The songs can sound like musical cotton candy — soft, airy and ultimately uninteresting. "For the most part, Bradley's music doesn't make that mistake." "The music is cinematic, filled with introspective piano solos, swelling violins, and a hypnotic song pacing that allows the listener to daydream."

== Track listing ==
"The Passage"
"Strings swell on 'The Passage', engulfing the listener in an ocean of sound", states New Age Voice

"Be Still"
An arrangement "structured so that the trumpet can lead a line out ... signaling an introspective sort of mood."

"Blue Rock Road"
"Even cuts that start quiet, such as 'Healing the Hollow Man' or 'Blue Rock Road' ebb and flow between quiet moments and crescendos."

"Robbins Island"
Named for a city park in Willmar, Minnesota.

1. "A Lover's Return" – 4:08
2. "Feel" – 4:32
3. "Jewel" – 4:26
4. "Healing the Hollow Man" – 4:12
5. "Blue Rock Road" – 3:13
6. "Robbins Island" – 3:54
7. "Stray" – 6:05
8. "A Stolen Kiss" – 4:08
9. "The Gallery" – 4:30
10. "Be Still" – 2:52
11. "Coastal Highway" – 3:14
12. "Storyteller" – 4:56
13. "The Passage" – 4:18

== Personnel ==
- All songs composed, arranged, and produced by Bradley Joseph.
- Bradley Joseph – keyboards, vocals
- Charlie Adams, Marc Anderson – percussion
- James Anton – electric bass
- Gordy Johnson – string bass
- Daniel Neale, Aron "Pumpkin" Trooien – guitar
- James Wheeler – drums
- David Levin, Clystie Whang – vocals
- Charlie Bisharat – solo violin
- Terry Brau – bass clarinet, trumpet
- Melissa Hasin – solo cello
- Brian Pearson – flute, trumpet
- Jennifer Schumacher – English horn, oboe
- Steven P. Trochlil – clarinet

"Special thanks to the St. Olaf Players."

== Production ==
- Recorded at Pachyderm Studio, Cannon Falls, Minnesota. Engineered by Bob DeMaa and Bradley Joseph.

Additional recording at:

- The "A" room at Creation Audio Recording, Minneapolis. Engineered by Lynn Peterson and Bradley Joseph.
- Rumbo Recorders, Los Angeles. Engineered by Mark Agostino.
- More Core Music, Minneapolis; and Big World Studios, Willmar, MN. Engineered by Bradley Joseph.
- Mixed by Dan Harjung and Bradley Joseph at Secret Sound, Franklin, TN; assisted by engineer Chuck Linder.
- Executive Producer - Dan Harjung
- Mastered by - Treavor Sadler, Narada Media, using Apogee's UV22 digital process.
