= Classic Christmas (Bradley Joseph album) =

Studio album by Bradley Joseph
- Released: October 22, 2008
- Genre: Christmas; Easy listening
- Label: Robbins Island
- Producer: Bradley Joseph

Bradley Joseph chronology
Hymns and Spiritual Songs (2007)	Classic Christmas (2008)	Suites & Sweets (2009)

Classic Christmas is the 15th studio album by Bradley Joseph released in 2008 on the Robbins Island Music label.

While discussing, Classic Christmas, Gerry Grzyb, chairman of the University of Wisconsin–Oshkosh sociology department, states that Joseph's usual approach is to play the carol straight, and then add his own twists. "he's very effective at that—he doesn't stray as far as a jazz or classical organ improviser might, but he does keep the interest up." Grzyb says that the same applies to Joseph's earlier Christmas Around the World album, which he found even more interesting because of the use of other instrumental sounds (added via keyboards).

In a review by Carol Swanson, this album is an hour of "well-executed new age piano...gentle renditions of fourteen holiday favorites". She goes on to say that "Joseph's playing is measured and thoughtful, but never plodding, such as "'We Three Kings'...is elegant in its simplicity, with just a touch of exotic flavors".

== Track listing ==
1. "Angels We Have Heard on High" – 4:58
2. "Oh, Little Town of Bethlehem" – 4:48
3. "O Come All Ye Faithful" – 3:15
4. "The Wassail Song – 3:28
5. "Deck the Halls" – 3:17
6. "O Christmas Tree" – 4:08
7. "We Three Kings" – 6:04
8. "Up on the Housetop" – 4:32
9. "The First Noel" – 3:52
10. "Jingle Bells" – 4:49
11. "Away in a Manger" – 4:19
12. "It Came Upon the Midnight Clear" – 5:10
13. "What Child Is This?" – 4:33
14. "We Wish You a Merry Christmas" – 3:30

== Personnel ==
- All music arranged and performed by Bradley Joseph.
