= Scattered Trees =

American indie rock band

- Origin: Chicago, IL, United States
- Genres: Indie, Rock, Pop
- Years active: 2003-2012
- Label: Roll Call Records/EMI
- Members: Nate Eiesland (lead vocals, guitar); Ryne Estwing (bass, vocals); Alissa Eiesland (vocals, keys); Baron Harper (drums); Jason Harper (keys, guitar, vocals)
- Past members: Justin Eisenbraun (guitar)
- Website: www.scatteredtreesmusic.com

Scattered Trees was an American indie rock band from Chicago, Illinois. The band was on the Roll Call/EMI label before their breakup in 2012.

== Career ==
Scattered Trees began as a solo project for frontman Nate Eiesland, who moved from Brainerd, MN to Chicago in 2003 and began writing one song a month, each titled for the month it was written in.

Upon moving to Chicago, Nate and his now-wife Alissa met brothers Jason and Baron Harper as well as Ryne Estwing and Justin Eisenbraun whilst performing in the same Chicago suburb venues. The band released their debut album, Song For My Grandfather, in 2006. In 2007, they released their Heart of Glass EP through 4AM Records.

The band separated between 2007 and 2009, reforming after Eiesland's father's death, and he began writing songs again.

== Breakup ==
On August 19, 2012, it was announced that the Harper brothers were leaving the band. With scheduled studio recordings in the near future, the remaining members agreed to form a new band entitled ON AN ON. The final concerts were performed as Scattered Trees, though without Jason and Baron Harper.

== Discography ==
- Song For My Grandfather (2006)
- Heart of Glass (4AM Records, 2007)
- Sympathy (Roll Call Records/EMI, 2011)
