= God Shuffled His Feet (song) =

1994 single by Crash Test Dummies

Single by Crash Test Dummies

from the album God Shuffled His Feet
- Released: October 17, 1994
- Length: 5:10
- Label: Arista; BMG
- Songwriter: Brad Roberts
- Producers: Jerry Harrison; Crash Test Dummies

Crash Test Dummies singles chronology
"Afternoons & Coffeespoons" (1994)	"God Shuffled His Feet" (1994)	"The Ballad of Peter Pumpkinhead" (1995)

"God Shuffled His Feet" is a song by Canadian folk rock group Crash Test Dummies and was the fourth and final single from their 1993 album of the same name. The synthesized guitar solo is performed by guest artist Adrian Belew. Released in October 1994, the song reached number 14 on Canada's RPM 100 Hit Tracks chart, topping the Adult Contemporary chart in the process, and peaked at number three in Iceland.

== Music video ==
The music video directed by Tim Hamilton features a group of people gathering in a theatre to hear God speak only to find out that he is a puppet operated by an old man in the back (a la The Wizard of Oz).

== Charts ==
=== Weekly charts ===
Weekly chart performance for "God Shuffled His Feet"
Chart (1994–1995)	Peak position
Australia (ARIA)	70
Canada Top Singles (RPM)	14
Canada Adult Contemporary (RPM)	1
Iceland (Íslenski Listinn Topp 40)	3
Netherlands (Single Top 100 Tip)	7

=== Year-end charts ===
Year-end chart performance for "God Shuffled His Feet"
Chart (1994)	Position
Canada Adult Contemporary (RPM)	58
Iceland (Íslenski Listinn Topp 40)	64
