= Hear the Masses =

Studio album by Bradley Joseph
- Released: 1994
- Genres: Instrumental rock Neoclassical new age
- Length: 42:02
- Labels: More Core (1994); Robbins Island Music (1995)
- Producer: Bradley Joseph

Bradley Joseph chronology
Hear the Masses (1994)	Rapture (1997)

Professional ratings
Review scores
Source	Rating
Allmusic	link
Music Outfitters	(not rated)

Hear the Masses is the debut album by Bradley Joseph, (see 1994 in music), a self-produced and self-published release consisting of 10 original instrumental compositions ranging from upbeat piano to orchestral ballads.

It was recorded between world tours with Yanni and Sheena Easton, and Joseph invited most of the Yanni band to contribute. They include Charlie Adams (drums, percussion); Ric Fierabracci (fretless bass); Jeanette Clinger (vocals), and Grammy-winning violinist Charlie Bisharat. Other guest artists include Larry Preston (guitar), and Terry Brau — featured on numerous Bradley Joseph recordings — playing trumpet, saxophone, and fluegelhorn. "It's Bisharat's virtuostic violin that immediately attracts the listener's attention in the opening of 'Rose Colored Glasses' ...an upbeat song that has driving, forward momentum", states Music Outfitters. The "Gift" begins as a slow, dour march with vocal expressions by Joseph and Jeanette Clinger, but the tune quickly develops into a "buoyant" piano solo by Joseph. "Friday's Child" is a "dynamic blend of piano and sax".

Music from this release has been utilized during The Weather Channel's "Local on the 8s" segments including "Rose Colored Glasses", and "Friday's Child" which is included in the 2008 compilation CD, The Weather Channel Presents: Smooth Jazz II

Joseph often references the past when he names his songs and his music is frequently reminiscent of his rural Minnesota roots. "Wind Farmer" was inspired by childhood visits to a relative's farm near Olivia, says Anne Polta of the West Central Tribune.

== Track listing ==
1. "Rose Colored Glasses" – 3:24
2. "The Gift" – 4:24
3. "Friday's Child" – 4:33
4. "Wind Farmer" – 3:16
5. "Pictures In My Mind" – 2:29
6. "Hear The Masses" – 4:44
7. "The Bridge" – 7:19
8. "Goodbyes" – 3:56
9. "Amala-Dayo" – 2:54
10. "A Single Step" – 4:40

== Credits ==
- Bradley Joseph – keyboards, vocal expressions
- Charlie Adams – drums and percussion
- Charlie Bisharat – violin
- Terry Brau – horns
- Jeanette Clinger – vocal expressions
- Ric Fierabracci – fretless bass
- Larry Preston – guitars

== Production ==
- All compositions written, recorded, and produced by Bradley Joseph.
- Mixed by – Bradley Joseph & Dugan McNeill
- Mixed at – Psychic Dog Studios
- Mastered by – Clearsong
- Creative Direction & Promotion – Dan Jensen
- Art & Design – Pat Carney Studios, Inc.
- Portrait Photography – Ann Marsden
- Makeup – Cheryl Nick
- Inside Cover Photography – John Pederson

== Inscribed quote ==
"Dedicated to my parents -- 'For always trusting my dreams & beliefs. This album is a reflection of your love'".
