= The Journey Continues (Bradley Joseph album) =

Studio album by Bradley Joseph
- Released: November 1, 2003
- Genre: Instrumental; Adult contemporary Easy listening
- Length: 64:10
- Label: Robbins Island
- Producer: Bradley Joseph

Bradley Joseph chronology
One Deep Breath (2002)	The Journey Continues (2003)	Music Pets Love: While You Are Gone (series) (2004–2008)

The Journey Continues is Bradley Joseph's sixth album. A sequel to Solo Journey, this album was written after sound checks during Yanni's Ethnicity World Tour. "Soft piano to calm, compose, and renew".

"At the beginning of 2003, I embarked on my sixth tour with Yanni traveling 27,000 miles throughout North America. It was remarkable to play arenas in 60 of our country's greatest cities including Madison Square Garden in New York Cityand the Los Angeles Hollywood Bowl. The special audiences and beautiful cities inspired me to compose after sound checks, and I began writing my sixth CD, The Journey Continues. What an inspiration it was for me to sit alone on stage in these grand arenas and compose music."

An intermediate piano book for this album was released in 2008.

== Critical reception ==
Professional ratings
Review scores
Source	Rating
Wind and Wire Magazine	link

Reviewing for Wind and Wire Magazine, Michael Debbage writes, "The magical world of movies has a knack for exploring sequels. There is the beauty and beast effect when taking this pathway. The creative beauty allows the viewers to see the continued growth of its characters. The beastly aspect of this exploration is the Hollywood exploitation of an almost guaranteed return on its investment with no regard for its creative progression that usually sees diminishing returns. Bradley Joseph has decided to walk this tightrope by following up with Solo Journey that was released back in 2000. I am glad to report that The Journey Continues is entrenched in beauty, holding up well to its predecessor."

"The Road Ahead"
Joseph uses a chord progression that translates into a strolling rhythm, states Michael Debbage of Wind and Wire Magazine.

"An Ocean Above"
In this song, Joseph once again uses a slower cadence that brings to mind a "dancing but gentle ocean washing over your skin".

"In the Heart of Everyone"
A "richer more robust" sound can be heard on "In The Heart Of Everyone" that uses the lower keys of the ivory.

The "Journey saga", are considered to be "stripped back and basic" by Debbage, with this album featuring "Joseph and his piano with no additional clutter". "There is color in the songs via their understated melodies." In "An Ocean Above", Joseph once again uses a slower cadence that brings to mind a "dancing but gentle ocean washing over your skin". One thing Debbage did notice about the album was the heavy use of the upper register of the piano and was pleased to hear a richer more robust sound on "In the Heart of Everyone" that used the lower keys of the ivory. He also describes "A Light From Home" as "optimistic and lighthearted". The confidant "Within A Painting" has Joseph fluttering on the piano improvising much like his peer Michael Jones. Debbage declared The Journey Continues as one of the top 15 recordings of 2003. "There is no doubting that Bradley Joseph holds up the legacy of Solo Journey in fine fashion. There are no diminishing returns here, just attributes of elegance, grace and beauty."

== Track listing ==
1. "The Road Ahead" – 5:04
2. "A Warm Breeze" – 4:52
3. "The Stranger Within" – 7:20
4. "Letting Go" – 4:34
5. "My Friend" – 4:00
6. "Within A Painting" – 5:24
7. "An Ocean Above" – 4:58
8. "In Peace" – 6:24
9. "A Light From Home" – 5:32
10. "Away From The World" – 4:10
11. "Through Their Eyes" – 3:52
12. "In The Heart Of Everyone" – 4:06
13. "Forgiveness" – 3:24

== Personnel ==
- All music composed, produced, and performed by Bradley Joseph.
- Art and Design – Tony Horning
- Portrait Photography – Buck Holzemer
