= One Deep Breath =

Studio album by Bradley Joseph
- Released: February 14, 2002
- Genre: Instrumental; Adult contemporary Easy listening
- Length: 57:07
- Label: Robbins Island
- Producer: Bradley Joseph

Bradley Joseph chronology
Christmas Around the World (2000)	One Deep Breath (2002)	The Journey Continues (2003)

One Deep Breath is Bradley Joseph's fifth album. It held a position on NAV's top 100 radio chart for over six months.

== Critical reception ==
Professional ratings
Review scores
Source	Rating
Wind and Wire Magazine	link
Solo Piano Publications	link
Instrumental Weekly	link at the Wayback Machine (archived July 6, 2002)
Allmusic	link

Bill Binkelman of Wind and Wire Magazine writes, "One Deep Breath is an album with two distinct 'feels' to it: the more serene new age/ambient soundscapes that bookend the inner tracks and the more radio-friendly and mainstream music in-between. While I doubt fans of Liquid Mind or other mainly electronic new-age music artists would wholly embrace the overt romanticism of piano-led tracks like 'Dancers Waltz' or 'Dreamer's Lullaby', there is definite appeal on the album for fans of adult contemporary piano pieces as well as for lovers of the more minimal approach to new-age music." Reviewing for Solo Piano Publications, Kathy Parsons describes the album as "...a fascinating combination of structured melodic pieces and free-form, ambient compositions". Allmusic's, Jim Brenholts views One Deep Breath as a set of smooth adult contemporary pieces in which Joseph adds "world music flair and inspirational touches". "The vocal expressions by Clystie Whang and Joseph have devotional qualities that weave through the atmospheres and soundscapes smoothly." "One Deep Breath opens with a fairly quiet and unassuming tone, and gradually reveals a highly sophisticated soundscape that keeps your attention for the full duration of the album", states Instrumental Weekly.

"Dance of Life"
"Dance of Life" was inspired by Antonín Dvořák's "Rusalka". Parsons describes "Dance of Life" as being both joyful and pensive - almost anthemic in places. It is a bit more straightforward in its piano presentation, and will probably appeal the most to hardcore fans of solo instrumental music, says Instrumental Weekly.

The opening track, "Is This A Dream?", is a simple but "lovely" piano melody supported by various, understated synth elements. "Wildflowers" has been called "sweeping and romantic", and "rich sonic tapestry". "The wistful piano brings images of brightly-colored wildflowers gracefully bending in a gentle breeze." "A Moments Rest" borders on melancholic, which serves as illustration of the range of emotions to be found on One Deep Breath. "Dance of Life" was inspired by Antonín Dvořák's "Rusalka". Parsons describes it as being both joyful and pensive - almost anthemic in places. It is a bit more straightforward in its piano presentation, and will probably appeal the most to hardcore fans of solo instrumental music, says Instrumental Weekly. Joseph reveals his jazzier side with "Water Voyage", giving way to some "slick synth work" along with "fantastic and moving vocalizations". "Inside the Sky" opens with floating synth chords fused with ethnic percussion samples and twinkling bell trees, but soon develops into a reflective piano tone poem enhanced with discrete use of synth strings and keyboard textures here and there. It is rhythmic and mysterious at the opening, and then becomes a much more ambient and free-form piano solo that floats among the clouds and mists of the sky until the rhythm re-enters, perhaps symbolizing gentle winds. "If I Could Fly" is an "upbeat and positive" four-minute blend of piano and synth with an "almost angelic chorus" providing some "colorful" vocal backgrounds.

"One Deep Breath"
The title track, "One Deep Breath" closes out the album and is the most ambient of everything else to be found here. It is "stunning", both in its execution and how radical a change it is from what has come before.

One Deep Breath closes with its title track and is "breathtaking in its subtle beauty"; it floats and meanders for more than ten minutes, bringing in ocean sounds. It is far and away the most ambient of everything else to be found here, and is "stunning", both in its execution and how radical a change it is from what has come before. Binkelman writes, "Fantastic Liquid Mind-like ultra lush synth washes serenely caress the air while muted background keyboard textures add soft 'coloring' (along with water sounds/waves crashing on the shore). As the lushness wears away, a simple pleasant drone courses underneath a sustained bell-tone, but after a brief music-less (just the waves) interlude, another ambient texture is introduced, spacier and yet also just as beautiful as the earlier passages (again reminiscent of Liquid Mind as those lush choral effects re-emerge). Another interlude with just waves occurs, followed by gentle sparkling high tone bells and lower register warm drones and synth chords. More melodic stretches of elegant synthesizer washes lends an air of contentment to the later stages of the track. As the song concludes, the music fades farther and farther into the background until only the sound of waves remains.".

Parsons comments that One Deep Breath is an exceptionally good CD - especially if you enjoy structure as well as experimentation on one recording. "...All the songs are solid compositions and are performed with sincerity, grace, and an abundance of technique", cites Binkelman.

== Track listing ==
1. "Is This A Dream?" – 3:57
2. "Wildflowers" – 4:34
3. "Dreamers Lullaby" – 5:14
4. "A Moments Rest" – 5:58
5. "Dance Of Life" – 5:26 (Inspired by Antonín Dvořák's Rusalka
6. "Water Voyage" – 7:18
7. "Inside The Sky" – 4:52
8. "If I Could Fly" – 3:56
9. "Dancers Waltz" – 5:02
10. "One Deep Breath" – 10:14

== Personnel ==
- All music composed, produced, and performed by Bradley Joseph.
- Vocal expressions – Clystie Whang, Bradley Joseph
- Art and Design – Tony Horning
