= George Perkins (singer) =

- Born: September 25, 1942; Denham Springs, Louisiana
- Origin: (United States) American
- Died: April 17, 2013 (aged 70) Hammond, Louisiana
- Genres: Soul
- Occupation: Singer

George Perkins (September 25, 1942, Denham Springs, Louisiana – April 17, 2013, Hammond, Louisiana) was an American soul singer, best known for his 1970 hit "Crying In The Streets" which was based on observation of the funeral of Martin Luther King Jr. The song was covered by Buckwheat Zydeco with Ry Cooder on slide guitar. After dropping out of view 1974-1979 he made a comeback in 1980. He died at the age of 70.

== Discography ==
- "Crying in the Streets" Ebb Tide 1970
- "A Man In Love" / "When You Try To Use A Good Man" 1972
- "Baby You Saved Me" / "How Sweet It Would Be" 1972
- "I'm So Glad You're Mine" / "Poor Me"
- "No Need For A Black Man To Cry" / "I Wants To Be Free"
