= Chameleon (American band) =

American rock band

- Origin: Minneapolis, Minnesota, United States
- Genre: Rock
- Years active: late 1970s to early 1980s
- Label: Platinum Records
- Past members: Charlie Adams; Dugan McNeill; Mark Anthony; Johnny Donaldson; Yanni; Peter Diggins; Donny Paulson; Ted Collins

Chameleon was an American rock band active from the late 1970s through the early 1980s. It was founded by Charlie Adams. Chameleon made Billboard charts and was renowned for Adams' two-axis revolving, upside-down drum set, which he played in live concerts and on MTV. The band toured extensively, (sponsored by the Miller Brewing Co.) performing up to 260 shows a year. Band members have included Adams, drums, vocals, and percussion; Yanni, keyboards and synthesizers; Dugan McNeill, lead vocals and bass guitars; Johnny Donaldson, all guitars; Mark Anthony, lead vocals and keyboards; Peter Diggins, lead vocals and main guitars; Donny Paulson, guitars, vocals.

== Discography ==
- Chameleon (1981)
- Techno-color (1982)
- Balance (1983)
- Hologram Sky (1984)
