= Bradley Joseph =

American composer and producer (born 1965)

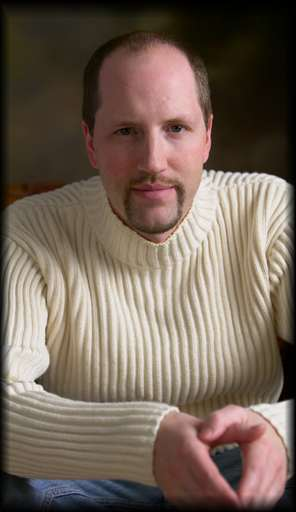

Background information
- Born: September 2, 1965 (age 60); Bird Island, Minnesota, U.S.
- Origin: Willmar, Minnesota, U.S.
- Education: Moorhead State University
- Genres: Contemporary instrumental; soft adult contemporary; smooth jazz; classical music; new age
- Occupations: Composer; arranger; record producer; musician
- Instrument: Keyboards
- Years active: 1983–present
- Labels: Robbins Island Music; Narada/Virgin
- Website: Official Website

Bradley Joseph (born September 2, 1965) is an American composer, arranger, and producer of contemporary instrumental music. His compositions include works for orchestras, chamber ensembles, and solo piano pieces. He has also played various instruments in rock bands throughout the Midwestern United States.

== Early life and education ==
Bradley Joseph was born in 1965 in Bird Island, Minnesota and raised in Willmar, Minnesota. Joseph began studying classical piano at the age of eight. He attended Willmar Senior High School, where he played piano for the school's jazz band and choir, and graduated in 1983.

Joseph attended Moorhead State University as a music major. While attending, he played saxophone and guitar in local bands but left to focus on piano. Later, he began performing with guitarist Dugan McNeill, whose group was signed to PolyGram.

== Career ==
=== Yanni ===
In 1989, Joseph recorded his first demo tape. He sent it to Greek composer Yanni, who subsequently hired Joseph to replace his touring band's keyboardist, John Tesh. Joseph's first show was at the Starplex Amphitheatre in Dallas, where Yanni's band performed with the Dallas Symphony Orchestra in 1990. He subsequently composed, arranged, and performed alongside Yanni for over six years. Joseph played keyboard.

Joseph appeared in the album and concert film Live at the Acropolis.

Between tours, Joseph worked as a studio musician. He also performed on a national keyboard show tour with various musicians. In 2003, he returned for Yanni's 60-city Ethnicity tour.

=== Sheena Easton ===
Joseph performed with Sheena Easton for four years as her co-musical director and lead keyboardist. In March 1995, Joseph appeared with Easton on The Tonight Show with Jay Leno.

=== Solo career ===
In 1994, Joseph released his debut album Hear the Masses.

Joseph then signed a record deal with Narada Productions, a subsidiary of Virgin Records. The result was Rapture, containing piano pieces, quartets, and full orchestral works. It reached ZMR's Airwaves Top 30 at No. 15 in July 1997. The album was recorded at multiple studios, including Captain & Tennille's Studio and Pachyderm Studio. In addition to his core band of Charlie Adams on percussion, Charlie Bisharat on violin, and Steven Trochlil on clarinet, Joseph also brought in a 50-piece orchestra.

==== Robbins Island Music ====
Joseph started Robbins Island Music in 1998, where he began composing, producing, and distributing his own recordings. Solo Journey was released that same year.

Later releases include Christmas Around the World, which reached ZMR's Top 100 Radio Playlist; and One Deep Breath, which remained on ZMR's Top 100 Radio Chart for over six months.

During Yanni's 2003 Ethnicity world tour, Joseph worked on his sixth album, The Journey Continues, a sequel to Solo Journey.

Subsequent releases include For the Love of It, Piano Love Songs, and Hymns and Spiritual Songs. He also produced CD and DVD projects designed for pets as part of the Music Pets Love series, and a four-CD set of Nature Sounds. His compositions are featured in the DVD Isle Royale Impressions, Volume II, which showcases video footage from Isle Royale National Park in Michigan by Carl TerHaar.

In April 2013, Joseph released Paint the Sky, which debuted at No. 15 on ZMR's Top 100 Radio Chart. Joseph described the release as "piano instrumentals with a cinematic feel".

==== Accolades and achievements ====
Joseph was named one of the Ten Outstanding Young Minnesotans (TOYM) of 2004 by the Minnesota Jaycees. In April 2008, he was presented with the WPS Foundation Arts and Academics Hallmarks of Pride award as an alumnus.

His music appears in airlines' in-flight music programs and The Weather Channel

Paint the Sky (2013) was nominated for Best Neo-Classical Album in the 10th Annual ZMR Music Awards.

== Artistry ==
=== Musical style ===
Hear the Masses and Rapture are two of Joseph's best-known full orchestrations, combining smooth jazz with contemporary instrumental themes. A review of Rapture in New Age Voice stated that Joseph "paints romantic pictures in sound with voices and instruments that escalate from quiet, intimate passages to big, energetic movements". In contrast, albums such as Solo Journey and The Journey Continues are described as "stripped back and basic". For the 2002 album One Deep Breath, he combines "structured melodic pieces and free-form ambient compositions", a style that marked a departure from his earlier works.

== Discography ==
=== Studio albums ===
Year	Title	Label
1994	Hear the Masses	More Core / Robbins Island Music
1997	Rapture, Narada	Narada/Virgin
1999	Solo Journey	Robbins Island Music
2000	Christmas Around the World	Robbins Island Music
2002	One Deep Breath	Robbins Island Music
2003	The Journey Continues	Robbins Island Music
2005	For the Love of It	Robbins Island Music
2006	Piano Love Songs	Robbins Island Music
2007	Hymns and Spiritual Songs	Robbins Island Music
2008	Classic Christmas	Robbins Island Music
2008	Music Pets Love Series (2004–2008)	Robbins Island Music
2009	Suites & Sweets	Robbins Island Music
2010	"Rest and Relax" Series: Forest Sounds, Ocean Waves, Thunder, and Nature Sounds with Music	Robbins Island Music
2013	Paint the Sky	Robbins Island Music
2015	Tibetan Monk Chants	Robbins Island Music

=== Credits ===
Year	Album Title	Artist / Label	Notes
1993	In My Time	Yanni / Private Music	Keyboards
1994	Live at the Acropolis	Yanni / Private Music	Keyboards
1999	The Private Years	Yanni / Private Music	Keyboards
2010	The Essential Yanni	Yanni / Masterworks	Keyboards

== See also ==
- List of ambient music artists
