= Dumb and Dumber To (soundtrack) =

2014 film soundtrack album

Dumb and Dumber To (Original Motion Picture Soundtrack)

Soundtrack album by Empire of the Sun
- Released: November 11, 2014
- Genres: Electronic; pop; rock; country music
- Length: 41:24
- Label: WaterTower Music

Dumb and Dumber To (Original Motion Picture Soundtrack) is the soundtrack album to the 2014 film Dumb and Dumber To directed by the Farrelly brothers, the third film in the Dumb and Dumber franchise and the sequel to Dumb and Dumber (1994) and featured Jim Carrey and Jeff Daniels reprising their roles from the first film. The soundtrack was released through WaterTower Music on November 11, 2014, and featured 12 tracks of licensed music as heard in the film.

== Background ==
In June 2013, the Farrelly brothers tweeted that Empire of the Sun, an electronic music duo consisted of Luke Steele and Nick Littlemore, will compose the musical score for Dumb and Dumber To. It was their maiden composition for a feature film. Their participation was confirmed days after the release of the band's sophomore album Ice on the Dune, which the band said that they had a film treatment and were "waiting for that person with a sackful of money to come along and pay for it". Coincidentally, the director duo confirmed the band's involvement through the tweet while they reviewed the album, and the musicians formally met the composer for their involvement.

Eventually, the band began working on the film during the early 2014, and also had spent time with Jim Carrey and the rest of the cast members. While the A-list talent was not the reason, on the band involving in the project, but rather what Steele said that "film is the most powerful medium". He added that the approach while composing an album provides a wide spectrum colors than in a record which had to follow a same thread, Steele also indicated the importance of soundtrack that lubricates the complete sequence, where "It's like when you go out on a first date, you wish could put some chords behind it. The music would really help."

In comparison to approaching a soundtrack as opposed to a studio album, Steele said that it was not how about writing down from the songwriter's perspective but interpreting a character's mind and their surroundings. This was an exciting challenge for the duo, as this had prompted on the reception of whether they could continue their involvement in scoring films. Considering the style of slapstick comedy, Steele felt that he had big pair of shoes to fill in the studio to write comedic music for the characters' antics.

Empire of the Sun recorded two new tracks for the film, besides composing the score and also used the song "Alive" from their 2013 album Ice on the Dune. The accompanying soundtrack featured previously recorded tracks, including a song by The Jane Carrey Band, a group led by Jim's daughter Jane Carrey. Another song by The Jane Carrey Band included in the film, "Breathing Without You", was not included on the album itself. The opening credits are set to Apache Indian's song "Boom Shack-A-Lak", just like in the first film, though not included in the soundtrack.

== Release ==
The soundtrack was released by WaterTower Music (Note: Although Universal Pictures distributed Dumb and Dumber To, the soundtrack was still released through WaterTower Music, Warner Bros. in-house music label over Universal's Back Lot Music as Warner Bros. was initially associated with the project before their exit, and their New Line Cinema company receiving "in association with" credit. (see production)) on November 11, 2014. An original song "Wandering Star" was released as the single from the album on December 4, 2014, three weeks after the film and album's release.

== Track listing ==
No.	Title	Artist	Length
1.	"Alive"	Empire of the Sun	3:25
2.	"She Got a Mind"	Natural Child	4:20
3.	"Right Action"	Franz Ferdinand	3:04
4.	"Mistakes of My Youth"	Eels	4:55
5.	"Cinderella"	Firefall	3:51
6.	"When I'm Alone"	Lissie	3:42
7.	"Me and You"	Jake Bugg	2:56
8.	"On the Dark Side"	John Cafferty & The Beaver Brown Band	2:42
9.	"Wandering Star"	Empire of the Sun	3:16
10.	"Periwinkle Sky"	The Dahls	3:02
11.	"Tonight"	Empire of the Sun	2:55
12.	"Sticky Situation"	The Jane Carrey Band	3:31
Total length:			41:24

== Chart performance ==
Chart (2009)	Peak position
UK Compilation Albums (OCC)	98
UK Soundtrack Albums (OCC)	44
US Top Soundtracks (Billboard)	22
