= Dumb and Dumber (franchise) =

Film series

- Directed by: Peter Farrelly (1, 3); Bobby Farrelly (3); Troy Miller (2)
- Written by: Peter Farrelly; Bobby Farrelly
- Produced by: Various
- Starring: Jim Carrey; Jeff Daniels
- Distributed by: New Line Cinema (1994, 2003); Universal Pictures (2014)
- Country: United States
- Language: English

Dumb and Dumber is a series of comedy films starring Jim Carrey and Jeff Daniels. The films have been released from 1994 to 2014.

== Films ==
Film	U.S. release date	Director(s)	Screenwriter(s)	Story by	Producer(s)
Dumb and Dumber	December 16, 1994	Peter Farrelly	Peter Farrelly, Bobby Farrelly, and Bennett Yellin	Peter Farrelly, Bobby Farrelly, and Bennett Yellin	Charles B. Wessler, Brad Krevoy, and Steve Stabler
Dumb and Dumberer: When Harry Met Lloyd	June 13, 2003	Troy Miller	Troy Miller and Robert Brener	Robert Brener	Oren Koules, Charles B. Wessler, Brad Krevoy, Steve Stabler, and Troy Miller
Dumb and Dumber To	November 14, 2014	Peter Farrelly and Bobby Farrelly	Peter Farrelly, Bobby Farrelly, Sean Anders, John Morris, Bennett Yellin, and Mike Cerrone		Charles B. Wessler, Riza Aziz, Joey McFarland, and Bradley Thomas

Dumb and Dumber story chronology
Original continuity
- Dumb and Dumberer: When Harry Met Lloyd (2003)
- Dumb and Dumber (1994)
- Dumb and Dumber (TV series) (1995–1996)
Alternate continuity
- Dumb and Dumber (1994)
- Dumb and Dumber To (2014)

=== Dumb and Dumber (1994) ===
The first film was released on December 16, 1994. Despite receiving mixed reviews from critics, it was a commercial success and developed a cult following in the years since its release. The success of Dumb and Dumber launched the career of the Farrelly brothers and solidified Carrey's. The film follows the characters of Harry and Lloyd as they travel across the country to Aspen to return a briefcase.

=== Dumb and Dumberer: When Harry Met Lloyd (2003) ===
In 2003, a prequel was theatrically released, entitled Dumb and Dumberer: When Harry Met Lloyd. The film featured a cast and crew different from the previous film (aside from Lin Shaye who reprised her role as Mrs. Margie Neugeboren), and the Farrelly brothers had no involvement in the film's production. It was panned by critics, receiving a 10% rating on Rotten Tomatoes. It was only a minor box office success, grossing approximately $39.2 million worldwide against a $19 million budget, as opposed to the original film's far greater $247 million worldwide gross against a $16–17 million budget.

=== Dumb and Dumber To (2014) ===
The Farrelly brothers returned to make a sequel to Dumb and Dumber. Carrey and Daniels returned to lead the film, and Bobby and Peter Farrelly returned to direct along with original screenwriter Bennett Yellin, and actors reprising their roles from the first film include Brady Bluhm, who played Billy in (Apartment) 4C, and Cam Neely, who played Sea Bass. Dumb and Dumber To was released on November 14, 2014, to dismal critical reviews and a moderate box office.

Unlike the original film, Dumb and Dumber To was not released by Warner Bros. Pictures but rather by Universal Pictures. Despite Warner having no involvement in the film, its New Line Cinema division, which produced the first film and the prequel, was still given studio credit from Universal.

=== Future ===
Peter Farrelly and Jeff Daniels have expressed interest in making a third film. In 2023 it was reported that a sequel to Dumb & Dumber To was in the works starring Carrey and Daniels, however since then there has not been any confirmation of the film's development.

== Television ==
Series	Season	Episodes	First released	Last released	Showrunner(s)	Network(s)
Dumb and Dumber	1	13	October 28, 1995	February 3, 1996	David Feiss	ABC

=== Dumb and Dumber (1995–1996) ===
In 1995, a Hanna-Barbera-produced animated series aired on ABC, as part of its Saturday morning cartoon lineup; Matt Frewer provided the voice of Lloyd, while Bill Fagerbakke voiced Harry. In the cartoon, Harry and Lloyd have reacquired their van, now named "Otto". The cartoon also features a new character, Kitty, a female pet purple beaver who appears to be smarter than both men. The animated series was written by Bennett Yellin, co-writer of the film. The show was short-lived and was shelved after one season.

== Cast and characters ==
- A ^{Y} indicates an actor or actress portraying a younger version of the character.
- A ^{U} indicates the actor or actress was uncredited for their respective role.

Characters	Films			Animated series
Characters	Dumb and Dumber	Dumb and Dumberer When Harry Met Lloyd	Dumb and Dumber To	Dumb and Dumber
Lloyd Christmas	Jim Carrey	Eric Christian Olsen Colin Ford^{Y}^{U}	Jim Carrey	Matt Frewer
Harry Dune	Jeff Daniels	Derek Richardson Lucas Gregory^{Y}	Jeff Daniels Dalton E. Gray^{Y}	Bill Fagerbakke
Sea Bass	Cam Neely		Cam Neely	
Billy in 4C	Brady Bluhm		Brady Bluhm	
Mrs. Margie Neugeboren	Lin Shaye	Lin Shaye		
Fraida Felcher		Julie Costello	Kathleen Turner Carly Craig^{Y}	
Mary Swanson	Lauren Holly			
J.P. Shay	Karen Duffy			
Joe "Mental" Mentalino	Mike Starr			
Nicholas Andre	Charles Rocket			
Special Officer Beth Jordan	Victoria Rowell			
Helen Swanson	Teri Garr			
Detective Dale	Felton Perry			
Jessica Matthews		Rachel Nichols		
Principal Collins		Eugene Levy		
Mrs. Dunne		Mimi Rogers		
Ray Christmas The Janitor		Luis Guzman		
Rita Felcher		Shawnie Costello		
Ice Pick			Bill Murray	
Adele Pinchelow			Laurie Holden	
Dr. Pinchelow			Steve Tom	
Penny Pinchelow			Rachel Melvin	
Travis and Captain Lippencott			Rob Riggle	
Weenie				Tom Kenny
Fingers				Maurice LaMarche
Bunny				Kathy Najimi
Dumbster				Bronson Pinchot

== Reception ==
=== Box office performance ===
Film	Release date	Box office gross			Box office ranking		Budget	Ref.
Film	Release date	North America	Other territories	Worldwide	All time North America	All time worldwide	Budget	Ref.
Dumb and Dumber	December 16, 1994	$127,175,374	$120,100,000	$247,275,374	#386	#444	$16–17 million	
Dumb and Dumberer: When Harry Met Lloyd	June 13, 2003	$26,276,465	$12,991,050	$39,267,515	#2,542		$19–30 million	
Dumb and Dumber To	November 14, 2014	$86,208,010	$83,629,000	$169,837,010	#715		$50 million	
Total		$239,659,849	$216,720,050	$456,379,899				
List indicator: A dark grey cell indicates the information is not available for the film.

=== Critical and public response ===
Film	Critical		Public
Film	Rotten Tomatoes	Metacritic	CinemaScore
Dumb and Dumber	67% (52 reviews)	41 (14 reviews)	B
Dumb and Dumberer: When Harry Met Lloyd	10% (119 reviews)	19 (28 reviews)	C
Dumb and Dumber To	30% (151 reviews)	36 (36 reviews)	B-

== Music ==
=== Singles ===
==== Crash Test Dummies – "The Ballad of Peter Pumpkinhead" ====
"The Ballad of Peter Pumpkinhead"

Single by Crash Test Dummies

from the album Dumb and Dumber soundtrack
- Released: January 1995
- Genre: Alternative rock
- Songwriter: Andy Partridge

Crash Test Dummies singles chronology
"God Shuffled His Feet" (1994)	"The Ballad of Peter Pumpkinhead" (1995)	"He Liked to Feel It" (1996)

The song was covered by Canadian group Crash Test Dummies in 1994 for the soundtrack to the film Dumb and Dumber. Crash Test Dummies' version is notable in that it was their first of two singles to feature Ellen Reid on lead vocals; it differs slightly from XTC's version, omitting the second verse. The video was filmed in Nathan Phillips Square, home to City Hall, in Toronto, Ontario; fans of the band were invited to an open casting by VJs on MuchMusic.

It features Jeff Daniels reprising his role of Harry Dunne from Dumb and Dumber. In the video, Harry falls and gets a Jack-o'-lantern stuck on his head. In his struggle to get it off, he foils a bank robbery and becomes a media sensation. However, he is unfairly found guilty of the bank robbery and narrowly avoids being hanged (he is saved by the pumpkin, which is placed on his head before he's put in the noose). It ends with a spoof of the religious imagery in the original video, as Harry's followers (oblivious to him having survived) venerate him as a martyr and establish the "Church of the Latter-Day Pumpkinheads" where they don Jack-o'-lantern masks, ape Harry's struggle to remove the pumpkin stuck to his head, and take communion of pumpkin seeds and wine sipped from a pumpkin stem.
