= BS2 =

BS2 may refer to:

- NHK BS 2, a former TV channel
- BS2, a BS postcode area for Bristol, England
- BS2, a center drill bit size
- BS/2, the original German name of the OS/2 operating system
- BASIC Stamp 2, a microcontroller
- Blake Snyder Beat Sheet, a storytelling structure; see Save the Cat!: The Last Book on Screenwriting You'll Ever Need
- Brave Saint Saturn, an American Christian rock band
- Brigade Spéciale N°2, a group related to Geheime Feldpolizei, the German secret military police during World War II
- Brilliance BS2, a car
- BS 2, Specification and Sections of Tramway Rails and Fishplates, a British Standard
- BS-II Bharat stage emission standards in India
- Banco BS2, a Brazilian bank

== See also ==
- BS-2A and BS-2B, a Yuri (satellite)
