= Big Blue Bug =

Giant termite statue in Rhode Island

Coordinates: 41°48′25.5″N 71°24′20.0″W

The statue in 2008

The Big Blue Bug, also known as Nibbles Woodaway, is the giant termite mascot of Big Blue Bug Solutions located along I-95 in Providence, Rhode Island. It is claimed to be the world's largest artificial bug at 920 times the size (by length) of an actual termite, standing 9 feet (2.7 m) tall and 58 feet (18 m) long and weighing 4,000 pounds (1,800 kg). It was constructed over a four-day period from wire mesh and fiberglass in late 1980 at a cost of US$20,000 (equivalent to $78,000 in 2025).

== History ==
The Big Blue Bug was built by Avenia Sign Company of North Providence. Anthony Pescarino, Tom Grenga, and Ronald Levesque assembled the sign over the course of a couple of months. Pescarino said: "We had to put the wings together and brought them to Delaine Street to have them coated in fiberglass."

The Bug was fiberglassed by Robert Garafano, Sr. of Olneyville; at Uptown Auto Body on Delaine st. It was assembled on site and then raised to the roof. The Bug was originally painted purple, the color of an actual swarming termite when observed under a microscope, but the paint soon faded to a pale blue, and the landmark became so well known in that condition that it was never repainted to its original color.

The Bug was originally known only as the "Big Blue Bug", a name coined by Providence traffic reporter Mike Sheridan, until 1990, when it received the name "Nibbles Woodaway" in a contest. Geraldine Perry of Tiverton submitted the winning name.

== Recent events ==
The Bug is annually "dressed" for Independence Day, Halloween, the season opener of the Pawtucket Red Sox baseball team (before the team relocated to Worcester, MA in 2021), and Christmas (in lights, reindeer antlers, and a blinking red nose). Since 1990, the company has sold stuffed toys in the Bug's likeness.

On June 20, 2002, the Bug left its home for a five-stop tour. It was refurbished and painted a brighter blue before being returned to the roof of New England Pest Control.

On April 9, 2012, New England Pest Control announced that they would be changing the company's name to "Big Blue Bug Solutions". The bug wore a necktie for the occasion.

In April 2020, in support of the "front line workers" facing COVID-19, the Big Blue Bug put on a surgical mask.

Big Blue Bug Statistics
Species	Subterranean Termite (Reticulitermes flavipes)
Height	9 feet (2.7 m)
Length	58 feet (18 m)
Diameter	6 feet (1.8 m)
Body Length	32 feet (9.8 m)
Four Wings	40 feet (12 m), folded over in pairs
Antennae	7 feet (2.1 m)
Legs	11 feet (3.4 m)
Weight	4,000 pounds (1,800 kg)
Stands	30 feet (9.1 m) above ground

== In popular culture ==
The bug has made numerous media appearances, including:

Films:

- Dumb and Dumber
- Dumb and Dumber To

Television:

- The Today Show
- The Oprah Winfrey Show
- The Daily Show
- Family Guy

Comic strips:

- Zippy the Pinhead
- Breaking Cat News by Georgia Dunn has the lighting of the Big Blue Bug as a subject of several strips.
- Bosquet

Books

- Providence by Geoffrey Wolff
- Roadside America by Mike Wilkins, Ken Smith, and Doug Kirby
- Weird New England by Joseph Citro.

Other:

- It was featured on a state scratch-off lottery ticket in 1997.
