= Steve Bach =

Steve Bach may refer to:

- Steve Bach (politician) (fl. 2010s), American politician who was mayor of Colorado Springs, Colorado
- Steve Bach (musician) (fl. 1980s–2020s), American keyboardist, accordionist, composer, and musical director

== See also ==
- Steven Bach (1938–2009), American writer and lecturer on film
