= Save the Cat!: The Last Book on Screenwriting You'll Ever Need =

2005 book by Blake Snyder

Save the Cat! The Last Book on Screenwriting You'll Ever Need
- Author: Blake Snyder
- Language: English
- Publisher: Michael Wiese Productions
- Publication date: 2005
- Publication place: United States
- Media type: Print (paperback)
- Pages: 194
- ISBN: 978-1-932907-00-1
- OCLC: 920244521

Save the Cat! The Last Book on Screenwriting You'll Ever Need is a 2005 non-fiction book on screenwriting by spec-screenwriter Blake Snyder, exploring plot structure in mainstream film. Snyder's approach has been widely adopted throughout the film industry and the book has remained a bestseller since publication, though it has received criticism for sexism and for offering what is perceived as an overly formulaic view of structure.

== Summary ==
=== Chapter 1: What Is It? ===
Snyder begins by arguing for the importance of developing a logline prior to writing the script. He defines a logline as a one- or two-sentence summary of a film that encapsulates its tone, potential, dilemma, characters, and audience. Snyder states that the ideal logline must satisfy four requirements:

1. Irony – The logline must be ironic and emotionally involving.
2. A compelling mental picture – The logline must imply the entire movie.
3. Audience and cost – The logline must demarcate the target audience and potential production cost.
4. A killer title – The logline must include a title that cleverly communicates the story's substance.

All of this, Snyder suggests, relates to the idea of high-concept, a term describing works that can be easily pitched to potential audiences. Snyder states that the best way to test loglines is by pitching your movies to anyone that will listen and adjusting accordingly.

=== Chapter 2: Give Me the Same Thing . . . Only Different! ===
Snyder stresses the importance of screening movies similar to yours and to analyzing them for their strengths and weaknesses. He suggests that dividing movies into categories based on their story types is more valuable than using traditional genre (e.g. romance or action). The categories that he uses are:

- Monster in the House (examples cited include Jaws, Alien, The Exorcist, and Fatal Attraction)
- Golden Fleece (examples cited include Star Wars, The Wizard of Oz, and Back to the Future)
- Out of the Bottle (examples cited include Groundhog Day, Bruce Almighty, and Freaky Friday)
- Dude with a Problem (examples cited include Die Hard, Titanic, and Schindler's List)
- Rites of Passage (examples cited include Ordinary People, Days of Wine and Roses, and When a Man Loves a Woman)
- Buddy Love (examples cited include Bringing Up Baby, Butch Cassidy and the Sundance Kid, E.T., Rain Man, and Dumb and Dumber)
- Whydunit (examples cited include Citizen Kane, Chinatown, and All the President's Men)
- The Fool Triumphant (examples cited include Amadeus, Forrest Gump, and The Pink Panther)
- Institutionalized (examples cited include Animal House, M*A*S*H, The Godfather, and American Beauty)
- Superhero (examples cited include Gladiator, Dracula, and A Beautiful Mind)

=== Chapter 3: It's About a Guy Who . . . ===
In this section, Snyder discusses character and the importance of finding the right hero for each story. The ideal hero, he argues, experiences the most conflict in the story's situation, has the longest emotional journey, and has a primal goal (e.g. survival, hunger, sex, protection of loved ones).

=== Chapter 4: Let's Beat It Out! ===
Here Snyder introduces what Save the Cat! is most famous for: the Blake Snyder Beat Sheet (or the BS2, as he calls it). The BS2 follows classic three-act structure but is more specific. Snyder refers to each act as thesis, antithesis, and synthesis, respectively.

1. Opening Image (p. 1) – The Opening Image is the first visual of any movie, and it should give an impression of the movie's tone, mood, type, and scope.
2. Theme Stated (p. 5) – A secondary character states the theme of the movie, usually in an offhand manner.
3. Set-up (p. 1–10) – The Set-up, the first ten pages of the script, shows the hero's world before the change that the story will bring. All major characters in the A-story are introduced or hinted at. The set-up should present the "Six Things That Need Fixing"—the things missing or need to be changed in the hero's life, from character flaws to basic needs to wishes. (Snyder states that six is an arbitrary number).
4. Catalyst (p. 12) – The Catalyst is a life-changing moment, something that presents the journey to the hero or makes it impossible for the hero to continue in their current stasis. This is also referred to as the Inciting Incident or the Call to Adventure.
5. Debate (p. 12–25) – During this section, the hero debates what to do about the Catalyst, and sometimes refuses the challenge, only to accept it later.
6. Break into Two (p. 25) – The hero makes the choice to go on the adventure. This propels them into Act II, the antithesis of Act I.
7. B Story (p. 30) – The B story is a break from the main story and carries the theme of the movie—usually in line with the A story but different in scope. It is often a love story, and new characters may be introduced. Snyder argues that the role of the B story here is to give the audience a breather after the Break into Two.
8. Fun and Games (p. 30–55) – The Fun and Games section, the first half of Act Two, provides "the promise of the premise"—the fun heart of the movie, which isn't as concerned with the forward progress of the story. It is often lighter in tone than the rest of the film.
9. Midpoint (p. 55) – The Midpoint is either a false victory or a false defeat, through which the stakes are raised. Often, the All Is Lost beat will inversely correspond to the Midpoint: for example if the Midpoint is a false defeat, the All Is Lost moment will be a false victory.
10. Bad Guys Close In (p. 55–75) – Things begin to get worse for the hero during this section, while the bad guys regroup. The hero faces increasingly complex and seemingly insurmountable obstacles to his or her goal.
11. All Is Lost (p. 75) – This is the lowest beat in the story—the hero's life falls apart, and there is no hope. Often there is a "whiff of death," anything that involves a death (for example, the hint of suicide or the death of a mentor).
12. Dark Night of the Soul (p. 75–85) – This is the darkness before the dawn, when the hero wallows absolute hopelessness—before picking themself up, digging deep and finding a solution.
13. Break into Three (p. 85) – The A and B stories intertwine and help the hero to find the solution. The final act (synthesis) begins.
14. Finale (p. 85–110) – The journey is resolved as the hero applies the lessons they have learned, the old world turns over, a new world is created, and the bad guys are dealt with in ascending order (from minor importance to greater importance). Snyder suggests that it's not enough for the hero to succeed, they must change the world.
15. Final Image (p. 110) – The Final Image mirrors the Opening Image, showing that a change has occurred.

=== Chapter 5: Building the Perfect Beast ===
Snyder introduces his method of story planning, which he refers to as The Board: a cork board or similar divided into four rows (Act One, the first half of Act Two, the second half of Act Two, and Act Three), on which are pinned index cards corresponding to scenes. The writer creates an index card for each scene which are also written emotional change, and conflict. Snyder encourages color-coding these cards based on characters, storylines, and themes.

=== Chapter 6: The Immutable Laws of Screenplay Physics ===
Here Snyder lists tricks and rules that he has collected over the years, including the eponymous Save the Cat rule: the hero must do something that makes the audience like them and want them to win (for example, in Disney's Aladdin, Aladdin shares his stolen food with some hungry kids). Other rules and tricks include The Pope in the Pool (a trick for introducing exposition without boring audiences),

=== Chapter 7: What's Wrong with This Picture? ===
In this section, Snyder offers methods for troubleshooting a finished script by identifying weak points and fixing them.

=== Chapter 8: Final Fade In ===
In the final chapter, Snyder discusses strategies for selling a script and making it in the film industry.

== Sequels ==
Save the Cat! is the first in the Save the Cat! book series, and was followed by two books also written by Blake Snyder: Save the Cat! Goes to the Movies (2007) and Save the Cat! Strikes Back: More Trouble for Screenwriters to Get Into . . . and Out Of (2009).

After Snyder's death in 2009, the series continued with Save the Cat! Blake's Blogs: More Information and Inspiration for Writers (2016), which is a compilation of Blake Snyder's blog posts and other writings on the subject of screenwriting.

The first book in the series not to feature Snyder's writing was Save the Cat! Goes to the Indies, a 2017 book by Salva Rubio that analyzes independent films according to Snyder's principles. It was followed in 2018 by Save the Cat! Writes a Novel: The Last Book on Novel Writing That You'll Ever Need by Jessica Brody.

== Reception ==
Save the Cat! has been commercially successful, and has remained a bestseller on Amazon for fifteen years. As late as 2020, Save the Cat! remained Amazon's number-one bestseller in both the Screenplay and Screenwriting categories. The Blake Snyder Beat Sheet has become "a staple in writing classes," and critics have argued (positively and negatively) that the book differs from other screenwriting books due to "the absolute specificity of Snyder's formula, as well as its widespread adoption by the film industry."

Peter Suderman, writing for Slate magazine, suggested that the book is responsible for a decline in creative storytelling in contemporary film:

"In Save the Cat!, [Snyder] stresses that his beat sheet is a structure, not a formula, one based in time-tested screen-story principles. It's a way of making a product that's likely to work—not a fill-in-the-blanks method of screenwriting. Maybe that's what Snyder intended. But that's not how it turned out. In practice, Snyder's beat sheet has taken over Hollywood screenwriting. Movies big and small stick closely to his beats and page counts. Intentionally or not, it's become a formula—a formula that threatens the world of original screenwriting as we know it."

Suderman goes on to argue that many pre-Snyder blockbusters, such as Jurassic Park, do hit all of Snyder's beats, but out of order and out of proportion. He suggests that the real issue is the film industry's current adherence to Synder's exact beats, order, and page counts, making movies feel formulaic.

Critics have also argued that Snyder's analysis is sexist. Mary M. Dalton, writing in the Journal of Film and Video, described Save the Cat! as "pithy and almost unbelievably sexist in its central assertions." This criticism was echoed by Suderman in his Slate review: "Save the Cat! doesn't go so far as to require that protagonists be men. But . . . It's not an accident that the chapter on creating a hero is called 'It's About A Guy Who . . .' not 'It's About A Person Who . . .'"

Other reviewers have been more positive. Screentalk Magazine described Save the Cat! as "quite simply one of the most practical guides to writing mainstream spec scripts on the market," and Baptiste Charles, writing for Raindance, praised Save the Cat! for being "one of the most to the point books you can get your hands on."
