= Blake Snyder =

American screenwriter and author

- Born: October 3, 1957
- Died: August 4, 2009 (aged 51)
- Occupations: author, educator, screenwriter, consultant
- Years active: 1987–2009
- Known for: Save the Cat!

Blake Snyder (October 3, 1957 – August 4, 2009) was an American screenwriter, consultant, author and educator based in Los Angeles. His screenplays include the comedies Stop! Or My Mom Will Shoot (1992) and Blank Check (1994).

Through his Save the Cat! trilogy of books on screenwriting and story structures, Snyder became one of the most popular writing mentors in the film industry. Snyder led international seminars and workshops for writers in various disciplines, as well as consultation sessions for some of Hollywood's largest studios.

Snyder died unexpectedly August 4, 2009, of what was characterized as either a pulmonary embolism or cardiac arrest. A public memorial was held at the Writers Guild of America, West on September 29, 2009.

== Early life ==
Snyder's father, Kenneth C. T. Snyder, was an Emmy-winning TV producer of many children's shows in the 1960s and 1970s. Among them were The Funny Company, Hot Wheels, animated segments on Sesame Street, Big Blue Marble and Roger Ramjet.

At the age of eight, Snyder was hired by his father as a voice talent for an animated special starring Sterling Holloway. Snyder continued doing children's voices alongside Gary Owens, June Foray and others until his voice changed and he was fired by his producer father.

Snyder went on to earn a B.A. degree in English from Georgetown University, and returned to Los Angeles where he began his career writing for the Disney TV series Kids Incorporated. Snyder began writing full-time as a screenwriter in 1987. He was a member of the Writers Guild of America for over 20 years.

Snyder's first spec screenplay sale was in 1989 for the script Stop! Or My Mom Will Shoot, which sold for $500,000 in a bidding war; the film won the 1992 Golden Raspberry Award for worst screenplay. Million dollar script sales include Blank Check, co-written with Colby Carr for Walt Disney Pictures, and Nuclear Family, co-written with James Haggin for Amblin Entertainment.

== Save the Cat! ==
Snyder's nonfiction book Save the Cat! The Last Book on Screenwriting You'll Ever Need was the number one selling book among screenwriting manuals on Amazon and in 2018 is on its 34th printing. The book describes in detail the structure of the monomyth or hero's journey, providing a by-the-minute pattern for screenwriting.

=== Title ===
The title Save the Cat! was coined by Snyder to describe a decisive moment when the protagonist demonstrates that they are worth rooting for. Snyder writes, "It's the scene where we [first] meet the hero", in order to gain audience favor and support for the main character right from the start. In the opening scene of the movie Frequency, for example, Frank Sullivan, played by Dennis Quaid, is a veteran firefighter who jumps into a manhole to save two workers from a gas explosion. Snyder argues that Frank's casual confidence facing danger makes him interesting to the audience. From this point, the audience is fully invested in Frank's well-being and rooting for him to succeed.

According to Snyder, this crucial element is missing from many of today's movies. He referenced Lara Croft: Tomb Raider – The Cradle of Life (2003) as being a film that focused on making the character Lara Croft "cool" and sexy (via a "new latex body suit for Angelina Jolie") instead of likable. An estimated $95 million was spent on this film, and it only grossed $156.5 million worldwide ($65.6 million in the U.S.). This sequel did not lose money, but it earned considerably less than the original Lara Croft: Tomb Raider (2001), which grossed $274.7 million worldwide ($131.1 million in the U.S.).

=== Premise ===
In his book, Snyder gave greatest emphasis on the importance of structure through his Blake Snyder Beat Sheet or the "BS2" which includes the 15 essential "beats" or plot points that all stories should contain.

Snyder's method expanded the 15 beats further into 40 beats, which are laid out on "The Board." The Board is divided into 4 rows, with each row representing a quarter of the story, namely the 1st Act, the 1st half of the 2nd Act, the 2nd half of the 2nd Act, and the 3rd Act.

Snyder also introduced 10 genres in his book that distinguished how stories are structured. According to Snyder, standard genre types such as Romantic Comedy, Epic or Biography did not say much about the story, only the type of movie it is. Snyder's system explored genre more fully, with categories such as "Monster in the House", "Golden Fleece", "Buddy Love" and others.

=== Criticism ===
The book has been criticized for allegedly leading to formulaic screenplays. While previous screenwriting advice was more conceptual, Save the Cat points to specific pages of the screenplay where beats should happen. Since screenplay pages are analogous to minutes of film, this has been called a minute-by-minute guide to writing a story.

A New York Times article criticized a perceived Hollywood formula. But it questioned whether Save the Cat caused the trend or was inspired by it.

=== Book series ===
In 2007, Snyder wrote Save the Cat! Goes to the Movies. The second book took 50 landmark movies, identified their specific genres, and broke them down into the 15 beats of the BS2.

The third book of Snyder's series, Save the Cat! Strikes Back: More Trouble for Screenwriters to Get Into... and Out Of, was published in November, 2009. This was the last book in the series to be authored by Snyder himself.

The fourth book was a compilation of Blake's blogs and other writings on the subject of screenwriting, titled Save the Cat! Blake's Blogs: More Information and Inspiration for Writers (published in 2016).

The fifth book was written by his student, Spanish screenwriter and novelist Salva Rubio. It is titled Save the Cat! Goes to the Indies, was published in April 2017, and features the analysis of 50 independent, European, auteur and cult films.

The sixth is the first non-screenwriting book, Save the Cat! Writes a Novel: The Last Book on Novel Writing That You'll Ever Need, written by student and young-adult novelist Jessica Brody (published on October 9, 2018).

=== Software ===
As a companion to his books, Snyder developed a story structure software product called Save the Cat! The Last Story Structure Software You'll Ever Need. The software places Snyder's Beat Sheet and Board on an end user's desktop, phone, or tablet. In 2008, Snyder and the software company Final Draft, Inc. specializing in script formatting, became partners in building import/export functions between the two programs. Snyder's company, Blake Snyder Enterprises, LLC, released an iPhone app of the software in November 2009 and an Android app in 2016. Version 4 of the software and apps, which includes new templates for novelists and television writers, was released in the fourth quarter of 2018.

=== Workshops and consultations ===
Snyder developed two weekend workshops for writers, filmmakers and executives. The introductory class, The Beat Sheet Workshop, helped participants come up with the solid structure of the 15 beats, before they embark on the actual writing of the script. In addition, The Beat Sheet Workshop was expanded to be led internationally.

The second workshop, a continuation of the first, called The Board Workshop, had participants take their 15 beats and expand them into 40 cards for a more detailed story structure. Snyder held his workshops all over the United States, Europe and Asia. The workshops were run year round. Snyder also taught his method at such universities as UCLA, Chapman University, Vanderbilt University and the Beijing Film Academy.

The in-person Beat Sheet Workshops continue, taught by "Master Cats" who were mentored by Snyder. The Beat Sheet Workshops expanded with online courses in 2017.

Following the release of his first book, Snyder provided script analysis to studios such as Disney, DreamWorks, Laika and Nelvana.

== Dedications ==
How to Train Your Dragon (DreamWorks, 2010) was dedicated to Snyder. Whispers Under Ground (Gollancz, 2012) by Ben Aaronovitch was dedicated to him as well.

== Filmography ==
- Stop! Or My Mom Will Shoot (1992)
- Blank Check (1994)

== Bibliography ==
- Save the Cat! The Last Book on Screenwriting You'll Ever Need (2005)
- Save the Cat! Goes to the Movies: The Screenwriter's Guide to Every Story Ever Told (2007)
- Save the Cat! Strikes Back: More Trouble for Screenwriters to Get Into… and Out Of (2009)
- Save the Cat! Blake's Blogs: More Information and Inspiration for Writers (2016)
  - Other STC titles:
- Save the Cat! Goes to the Indies: The Screenwriters Guide to 50 Films from the Masters (by Salva Rubio, 2017)
- Save the Cat! Writes a Novel: The Last Book On Novel Writing That You'll Ever Need (by Jessica Brody, 2018)
- Save the Cat! Writes a Young Adult Novel The Ultimate Guide to Writing a YA Bestseller (by Jessica Brody, 2023)
