= Steve Bach (musician) =

American accordionist and musical director

- Born: Steven Bach; New York City, United States
- Origin: Long Island, New York
- Genres: Jazz fusion; EDM; various others
- Occupations: Keyboardist; composer; musical director
- Instruments: Piano; accordion; synthesizers
- Years active: 1970s–present
- Website: stevebach.com

Steve Bach (also known as Steven Bach) is an American keyboardist, accordionist, composer, and musical director. Bach has performed and worked with many well-known musical artists from a wide variety of genres, most notably Stanley Clarke, Robby Krieger, Kitarō, Airto Moreira, Flora Purim, and Sergio Mendes. He was formerly a Cirque de Soleil band director and is the founder of 8 Keys Records, a self-release label record company.

== Early life ==
Steve Bach (born Steven Victor Bach) was born in New York City and raised in Long Island, New York. Since the age of five, he has been playing the accordion and piano, and was drawn to jazz in addition to folk music.

== Career ==
After studying music theory at SUNY Potsdam and Hofstra University, Bach worked as a jazz pianist in New York City. Bach moved to California in 1978, and in 1979 became a keyboardist playing with Stanley Clarke, a well-known American jazz bassist, and played keyboards on Clarkes' 1980 album Rocks, Pebbles and Sand. Bach also performed and toured with Japanese-American new-age music artist Kitarō during the mid 1980s. In the late 1980s, Bach went on international tours playing Brazilian jazz with a famed Brazilian duo consisting of percussionist Airto Moreira and vocalist Flora Purim. Bach also toured with Brazilian musician Sérgio Mendes, who crosses bossa nova with jazz and funk. He also played piano and keyboards for Andy Williams, and also performed on keyboards with Bill Henderson.

In addition, Bach has performed as a pianist with American guitarist Robby Krieger.

With Empire of the Sun, Bach co-wrote the 2013 hit single "Alive" as part of the album Ice on the Dune. The song ranked #79 on Rolling Stone Magazine’s 100 Best Songs of 2013 list.

In 2014, Bach was nominated for the APRA Music Awards (Dance Work of the Year).

From 2007 to 2024, Bach spent time as a band leader and technician for Cirque de Soleil. He continues to play the accordion and keyboards, and still serves as a musical director with Cirque de Soleil.

== Discography ==
Below is a list of selected works by Steve Bach, including songs and albums that he had produced.

=== Albums ===
Albums (as primary artist and producer)

- 1985 – Child’s Play
- 1985 – Holiday
- 1987 – Zero Gravity
- 1988 – More Than A Dream
- 1990 – Nice Moves
- 1992 – City Magic
- 1997 – Now And Then
- 2016 – 8 Keys (8 Keys Records)
- 2017 – Bach Solo (8 Keys Records)
- 2018 – Yes and Know (8 Keys Records)

Album credits

- 1980 – Rocks, Pebbles and Sand (keyboardist; with Stanley Clarke)
- 1988 – The Midnight Sun (with Flora Purim)
- 1990 – What’s Inside (with Richard Elliot)
- 2001 – Ballads (with Richard Elliot)
- 2013 – Ice on the Dune (with Empire of the Sun)
- 2016 – Two Vines (with Empire of the Sun)

=== Selected songs ===
- "Fast Break (Soundwings)"
- "Alive" (co-written with Empire of the Sun)
- "Keep a Watch" (co-written with Empire of the Sun)
- "Just Me and You" (co-written with Richard Elliot)

== Selected publications ==
- Strictly Strings, Pop-Style Solos and Yamaha Pop-Style Solos book series
