= High concept =

Artistic work with easily summarized premise

High concept is a type of artistic work that can be easily pitched with a succinctly stated premise. It can be contrasted with low concept, which is more concerned with character development and other subtleties that are not as easily summarized. The origin of the term is disputed.

== Terminology ==
The term "high concept" was originally used to refer to a film with complex or abstract ideas, but became increasingly used to refer to films with straightforward, easy-to-explain concepts.

High-concept narratives are typically characterized by an overarching "what if?" scenario that catalyzes the following events. Many summer blockbuster movies are built on a high-concept idea, such as "what if we could clone dinosaurs?" as in Jurassic Park.

High-concept narratives differ from analogous narratives. In analogous narratives, a high-concept story may be employed to allow commentary on an implicit subtext. A prime example of this might be George Orwell's Nineteen Eighty-Four, which asks, "What if we lived in a future of totalitarian government?" while simultaneously generating social comment and critique aimed at Orwell's own (real-world) contemporary society.

Similarly, Gene Roddenberry's sci-fi series Star Trek went beyond the high-concept storytelling of a futurist starship crew, by addressing 20th century social issues in a hypothetical and defamiliarizing context. Planet of the Apes (1968) likewise engages in social commentary regarding race relations and other topics from modern human society via the lens of the ape civilization, in part as a response by screenplay co-writer Rod Serling to his experiences of anti-Semitism.

== Characteristics ==
The term is often applied to films that are pitched and developed almost entirely upon an engaging premise with broad appeal, rather than standing upon complex character study, cinematography, or other strengths that relate more to the artistic execution of a production. Extreme examples of high-concept films are Snakes on a Plane and Sharknado, which describe their entire premises in their titles.

A movie described as being "high-concept" is considered easy to sell to a wide audience because it delivers upon an easy-to-grasp idea. This simple narrative can often be summed up with a single iconic image, such as the theme park logo from Jurassic Park. Along with having well-defined genre and aesthetics, high-concept films have marketing guidelines known as "the look, the hook and the book".

- The look of the film is simply how visually appealing it is to the public, usually before its release. Jurassic Park would show the world dinosaurs as they had never been seen before.
- The hook is the story the film is trying to sell to its audience. Everyone wanted to know how dinosaurs could walk the Earth again after being extinct for 65 million years and how they would coexist with people.
- The book can be labeled as all the merchandise made to help promote the film. The merchandise in Jurassic Park was destined to sell well, with people wanting the T-shirts and lunch boxes that were shown for sale within the movie itself, with similar merchandise later to be sold at Universal Studios in the gift shop connected to the Jurassic Park ride.

== Commercial benefits ==
High-concept television series and movies often rely on pre-sold properties such as movie stars to build audience anticipation, and they might use cross-promotional advertising campaigns with links to a soundtrack, music videos, and licensed merchandise such as DVD box sets. They commonly apply market and test screening feedback to alter the narrative (or even, as in the case of Snakes on a Plane, the dialogue) to ensure maximum popularity.

Some commercial blockbuster movies are built as star vehicles for successful music and sports personalities to enter the movie business. In such commercial vehicles, where the onscreen activity is less important than the marketability of the product brand, a high-concept narrative is often used as a "safe" option to avoid the risk of alienating audiences with convoluted or overly taxing plot exposition.

== Examples ==
=== Film ===
- Jaws (1975)
- Back to the Future (1985)
- Aliens (1986)
- Independence Day (1996)
- Cube (1997)
- The Truman Show (1998)
- Armageddon (1998)
- Snakes on a Plane (2006)
- Inception (2010)
- Hobo with a Shotgun (2011)
- The Platform (2019)
- KPop Demon Hunters (2025)

=== Television ===
- The Beverly Hillbillies (1962-1971)
- Gilligan's Island (1964-1967)
- Clone High (2001–2002; revived 2023–2024)
- Dog with a Blog (2012–2015)
- Eaten Alive (2014)
- Designated Survivor (2016-2019)
- Son of Zorn (2016–2017)
- The Good Place (2016–2020)
- That Time I Got Reincarnated as a Slime (2018-present)
- Pantheon (2022–2023)
- Velma (2023–2024)

== See also ==
- Elevator pitch
- Log line
- Save the Cat!
