= Dumb and Dumber To =

2014 film by the Farrelly brothers

- Theatrical release poster
- Directed by: Peter Farrelly; Bobby Farrelly
- Written by: Sean Anders; John Morris; Peter Farrelly; Bobby Farrelly; Bennett Yellin; Mike Cerrone
- Based on: Characters by: Bennett Yellin; Peter Farrelly; Bobby Farrelly
- Produced by: Charles B. Wessler; Bradley Thomas; Bobby Farrelly; Peter Farrelly; Riza Aziz; Joey McFarland
- Starring: Jim Carrey; Jeff Daniels
- Cinematography: Matthew F. Leonetti
- Edited by: Steven Rasch
- Music by: Empire of the Sun
- Production companies: Red Granite Pictures; Conundrum Entertainment
- Distributed by: Universal Pictures (Note: New Line Cinema received a participation stake and "in association with" credit after their parent company Warner Bros. Pictures backed out of distributing the film.)
- Release date: November 14, 2014
- Running time: 109 minutes
- Country: United States
- Language: English
- Budget: $50 million
- Box office: $169.8 million

Dumb and Dumber To is a 2014 American buddy comedy film produced, co-written and directed by the Farrelly brothers. It is the third film in the Dumb and Dumber franchise, and serves as a sequel to the 1994 film Dumb and Dumber. The film stars Jim Carrey and Jeff Daniels as Lloyd Christmas and Harry Dunne, reprising their respective roles 20 years after the events of the first film, and follows the duo as they discover Harry has a daughter, who was set up for adoption as a baby by her single mother, leading them to journey on a cross-country road trip to locate her.

First announced in October 2011, Dumb and Dumber To underwent a turbulent pre-production phase which included, at one point, Carrey briefly withdrawing from the project, and Warner Bros. Pictures exiting the project; Warner Bros.' New Line Cinema division received "in association with" credit, per their participation stake. The project was eventually taken on in 2013 by Red Granite Pictures and the film was shot later that year. Released on November 14, 2014, by Universal Pictures, the film received mixed to negative reviews from critics. But it grossed $36.1 million on its opening weekend and over $169 million worldwide becoming a box office success.

On June 15, 2017, the United States Department of Justice charged that money used to produce the film was stolen from a Malaysian government investment fund. Red Granite Pictures denied knowingly accepting stolen money. Prosecutors also filed a Forfeiture Complaint in federal court to seize the rights of ownership to Dumb and Dumber To as well as the rights to the 2015 film Daddy's Home. Red Granite later made a $60 million settlement.

== Plot ==
For 20 years a catatonic Lloyd Christmas has been committed to a mental institution ever since he discovered Mary Swanson was already married at the end of the first film. During a visit, Lloyd's best friend Harry Dunne pleads with him to snap out of it, then discovers that Lloyd has pranked him by faking his condition the entire time.

Harry reveals he needs a kidney transplant, and learns he cannot get one from his parents because he was adopted as a baby. Harry's dad gives him his mail that has been piling up since he moved out. It includes a 1991 postcard from ex-girlfriend Fraida Felcher, stating she is pregnant and needs Harry to call. Upon contacting her, Fraida reveals that she had a daughter named Fanny, who she gave up for adoption. She once wrote Fanny a letter, only for it to be returned and instructed to never contact her again.

Hoping Fanny can provide a kidney, Lloyd and Harry drive to Oxford, Maryland, where she now lives. Dr. Bernard Pinchelow and his wife Adele are Fanny's adoptive parents. Fanny, who has taken the name Penny, is going to a KEN Convention in El Paso, Texas to give a speech on her father's life work. Bernard had wanted Penny to deliver a package to one of the convention heads but, being dim-witted, she ends up forgetting the package and her cellphone.

Adele is secretly trying to poison Bernard to have his fortune, with the help of her secret lover, family housekeeper Travis Lippincott. Harry and Lloyd arrive to inform the Pinchelows of their situation. Bernard realizes Penny forgot the package, which he says contains an invention worth billions. Adele suggests that Harry and Lloyd deliver the package to Penny. Travis accompanies them, hoping to get the box for himself and Adele. He becomes increasingly annoyed with the duo, and attempts to kill them after they pull a near death-causing prank on him, although he ends up dying in a train collision. Adele hears of the death from Travis's twin brother Captain Lippincott, a former military man who agrees to help her kill Harry and Lloyd.

The duo arrives at the convention, where Harry impersonates Bernard. They are invited to a seminar, but get into an argument when Harry discovers that Lloyd has developed a romantic attraction to Penny, having seen her photo earlier. Lloyd is escorted out of the convention due to not being on the attendance list. He gets a call from Penny and informs her that he is in town with her dad. Lloyd meets her at a restaurant and deduces that he, not Harry, is Penny's father.

Adele arrives at the convention with Lippincott and exposes Harry as a fraud, telling the convention heads that he stole the package. Fraida also arrives and triggers the fire alarm to create a diversion after she and Penny are denied entry. As the building is evacuated, Harry runs into Fraida and Penny, only to have Lippincott and Adele corner them with guns. Lloyd returns, having been to Mexico to have one of his own kidneys removed for Harry. FBI agents also bust in with Bernard, who reveals that he has been aware of Adele's plot and that his package only contains cupcakes. Fraida learns that it was Adele, not Penny, who wrote "do not contact again" on Fraida's letter. Angered by the unraveling of her scheme, Adele attempts to shoot Penny, but Harry takes the bullet for her and is injured. Adele and Lippincott are arrested.

Harry is rushed to a hospital where he reveals that he was pranking Lloyd about needing a kidney. During that moment, the doctor reveals inside Lloyd's cooler is not his kidney, but a pork chop, indicating that Lloyd was scammed. Fraida reveals that Penny's actual biological father is not Harry or Lloyd but their deceased high school friend, Peter "Pee-Stain" Stainer. She also points out they couldn't have been Penny's father as she never had sex with either of them. As the duo leave El Paso, they spot two gorgeous young women walking in their direction. The dimwitted duo then push the two beauties into a bush as a joke and holler "Bush Club". Harry and Lloyd run off and high-five each other.

In a post-credits scene, Harry and Lloyd inadvertently toss their milkshakes onto the windshield of Sea Bass, the trucker whom the duo had scammed in the first film, leading to him angrily bearing down on them in his truck. A false advertisement for Dumb and Dumber For is then shown, with a camouflaged Captain Lippincott appearing from the advert and walking off-screen.

== Cast ==
- Jim Carrey as Lloyd Christmas, Harry's friend and the dumber of the two
- Jeff Daniels as Harry Dunne, the slightly smarter yet unintelligent one and Lloyd's friend
  - Dalton E. Gray as Young Harry
- Rob Riggle as Travis Lippincott and Captain Lippincott, twin brothers, one a landscaper scheming with Adele to secretly kill Dr. Pinchelow, the other, a Black Ops Specialist who was supplying his brother with various poisons
- Laurie Holden as Adele Pinchelow, Dr. Pinchelow's scheming wife
- Don Lake as Doctor Roy Baker
- Kathleen Turner as Fraida Felcher, an ex-whore whom Lloyd and Harry had a past fling with
- Steve Tom as Dr. Bernard Pinchelow, a brilliant scientist who was suffering from ailments
- Rachel Melvin as Penny Pinchelow/Fanny Felcher, Dr. Pinchelow's adopted daughter and Fraida's biological daughter
- Tembi Locke as Dr. Walcott
- Paul Blackthorne as Emergency Room Doctor
- Brady Bluhm as Billy in 4C
- Swizz Beatz as Ninja Leader in Lloyd's fantasy sequence
- Bill Murray as Ice Pick (cameo)
- Derek Holland as patient in the asylum
- Mama June as fantasy wife of Harry
- Cam Neely as Sea Bass, a brutish truck driver whom Lloyd scammed in the original film

== Production ==
=== Development ===
After months of speculation, the Farrelly brothers confirmed in October 2011 that they would make a sequel to Dumb and Dumber. The script was completed the following year in October, and Jim Carrey and Jeff Daniels were expected to reprise their roles, despite the former having temporarily withdrawn his involvement in June due to concerns that Warner Bros. Pictures had shown little enthusiasm for the sequel. In response to these developments, Daniels said he would not do the sequel without Carrey.

Regarding the progress of the sequel, Peter Farrelly explained:

It's going well. We have a great script and now we are just trying to get it made. I love the script. It's exactly like the first one. We pick up 20 years later. We explain what they've done for the last 17 or 18 years. We take off from that and it's just a lot of laughs. It's at Warner Bros., and right now it's being financed outside the studio, but it will be released by Warner Bros. And that's all being worked out right now. If you liked Dumb and Dumber, you'll like this because it's the same and more. It's really fun. It's being made through Warner Bros. but now we have several financiers that are negotiating with the studio and trying to make the best deal. Whichever one does will make the movie. It's going to be made through Warner Bros. and released by Warner Bros. but financed by an outside financer.

Australian band Empire of the Sun composed the score for the film. In June 2013, Warner Bros. decided not to move forward with the sequel but allowed the film to be pitched to other studios. Soon after, Red Granite Pictures, agreed to finance the sequel with a $35 million budget, with Warner Bros. receiving "participation stake". Additionally, Universal Pictures acquired the film's distribution rights in North America, the United Kingdom, Ireland, Australia, New Zealand, Germany, Austria and Spain, while Red Granite sold the film to independent distributors. Warner Bros.'s New Line Cinema division—which produced the first film and its prequel, Dumb and Dumberer: When Harry Met Lloyd—was given a studio credit.

Although Peter Farrelly confirmed the sequel was moving forward, a lawsuit filed by Red Granite Pictures in July sought a declaration that Red Granite owes no contractual obligation to Dumb and Dumber producers Steve Stabler and Brad Krevoy and that the duo are not entitled to any producer fees or credits they claim they're contractually owed on the sequel. In a counter claim, the producers of Dumb and Dumber accused the producers and Red Granite Pictures of racketeering. On July 18, 2014, a request for dismissal was filed in a Los Angeles Superior Court and the case was officially settled. The announcement of the settlement listed the plaintiffs as executive producers, and all claims against Red Granite, Riza Aziz and Joey McFarland of racketeering were withdrawn. The plaintiffs said in a statement: "We apologize for naming Riza Aziz and Joey McFarland as individual defendants rather than just Red Granite".

Besides Daniels and Carrey reprising their roles, Kathleen Turner was cast in the role of Fraida Felcher. Brady Bluhm reprised his role as Billy in 4C for the sequel. Farrelly brothers frequent collaborators Bennett Yellin and Mike Cerrone co-wrote the script. Screenwriting duo Sean Anders and John Morris did work on the script as well.

Although Cam Neely and Boston Bruins left winger Milan Lucic were rumored to appear in the film as Sea Bass and his son respectively, they said that they did not sign on to the film, but they were open to do so. Neely ultimately shot a scene for the film, which appears after the credits. Laurie Holden, Steve Tom, and Rachel Melvin joined the cast of the film as the Pinchelow family. Jennifer Lawrence was rumored to be filming a cameo in the film as a younger Fraida Felcher which was not included in the final cut. Lawrence has said in past interviews that she is a big fan of the original film. Some sources indicate that the scene was filmed, but cut from the film after Lawrence vetoed it, a claim denied by both the Lawrence and Farrelly camps. Bobby Farrelly explained that they tried to work around her schedule, but they were unable to do it.

The film was released on November 14, 2014.

=== Filming ===
Filming for the sequel began on September 24, 2013. Principal photography began in Atlanta. The film crew created sets in different areas of Georgia to stand in for locations in states such as Kansas and Rhode Island. Filming was formally completed on November 25.

== Music ==
The opening credits are set to Apache Indian's song "Boom Shack-A-Lak", just like in the first film.

The soundtrack was released by WaterTower Music on November 11, 2014. Empire of the Sun recorded two new tracks for the film, and used the song "Alive" from their 2013 album Ice on the Dune. The rest of the soundtrack consists of previously recorded tracks, including a song by The Jane Carrey Band, a group led by Carrey's daughter Jane Carrey. Another song by The Jane Carrey Band included in the film, "Breathing Without You", was not included on the album itself.

== Release ==
=== Marketing ===
The theatrical trailer premiered on The Tonight Show Starring Jimmy Fallon on June 10, 2014. In its first week, the trailer had 23.5 million views on YouTube, outpacing nine other trailers, whose combined views numbered 23 million. The international trailer was released on June 25.

On August 15, Universal released two advance posters that spoofed the theatrical release poster for Lucy, another Universal-distributed release that was then in theaters. The two spoof posters, that reversed the "using more than ten percent of the brain" premise of Lucy to imply Harry and Lloyd only used one percent, were made public via Tweets from the Twitter accounts of Jim Carrey and Jeff Daniels. An official TV spot was released on September 25.

=== Home media ===
Dumb and Dumber To was released on Blu-ray and DVD on February 17, 2015.

== Reception ==
=== Box office ===
At the end of its box office run, Dumb and Dumber To accumulated a gross of $86.2 million in North America and $83.6 million in other territories for a worldwide total of $169.8 million, against a budget of $50 million.

==== North America ====
Early analysts predicted that the film could gross around $30–32 million in its opening weekend and as high as $36–40 million in North America.

The film earned $1.6 million from Thursday night previews and $14.2 million on its opening day on Friday. The film topped the box office in its opening weekend earning $38,053,000 from 3,154 theatres at an average of $12,065 per theatre. The opening weekend gross is higher than the $16.1 million debut of the original film ($31 million adjusted for inflation), and is Carrey's biggest debut weekend since Bruce Almighty in 2003 ($67.9 million). The film played 47% under the age of 25 and 55% male. Universal distribution chief Nikki Rocco commented about the opening performance: "This was tricky to market. A lot of these kids weren't born when the first [film] came out. But it has been such a serious time in movies, we had great marketing, mindless humor, and we broadened the audience".

==== Outside North America ====
In its first weekend outside of North America, Dumb and Dumber To made over 13 million dollars. It opened number one in Brazil, Slovenia, Norway, Lebanon, South Africa, Iceland, Croatia, UAE, Uruguay. It opened number two in Poland, Austria, Colombia, Serbia, Spain, Finland, Sweden. It opened number three in Singapore, Germany, Nigeria, Netherlands, Mexico, Egypt. The largest opening was in Brazil with $3,497,325.

Outside North America, Dumb and Dumber To earned $3.2 million from four markets. The highest debut came from Germany ($1.4 million).

=== Critical response ===
On Rotten Tomatoes, Dumb and Dumber To has an approval rating of 31% based on 150 reviews, with an average rating of 4.50/10. The general consensus states, "Dumb and Dumber To does have its moments, but not enough of them—and the Farrelly brothers' brand of humor is nowhere near as refreshingly transgressive as it once seemed". On Metacritic, the film has a score of 36 out of 100, based on 36 critics, indicating "generally unfavorable" reviews. Audiences surveyed by CinemaScore gave the film a grade "B−" on scale of A to F.

I laughed a lot at this movie, possibly even more than I did at the original film, which I enjoyed quite a bit.

— Peter Howell, Toronto Star

J. R. Jones of the Chicago Reader gave the film a positive review: "Seeing the two fiftysomething stars in their idiot haircuts again is a little disconcerting, like watching your favorite old band on a desperate reunion tour, but this sequel to Dumb & Dumber maintains a respectable laugh quotient". Colin Covert of the Star Tribune of Minnesota gave the film one out of four stars and wrote: "The result is simply stupid. This embarrassing revival plays as if the script were written in Comic Sans". Andrew Barker of Variety gave the film a negative review, noting: "Sporadically funny and mostly tedious, this 18-years-too-late sequel nonetheless exhibits a puerile purity of purpose". Joe Neumaier of New York Daily News gave the film zero out of five stars: "From junky production values to the parade of unfunny supporting characters to its lazy energy, Dumb and Dumber To falls on its face". Jason Clark of Entertainment Weekly gave the film a C−: "The ultimate sad realization is not that Dumb & Dumber To doesn't match the original's good-time quotient, but that it might not even be as good as - yikes - Dumb and Dumberer: When Harry Met Lloyd". Claudia Puig of USA Today gave the film one out of four stars: "If there was any doubt that most things in society have been dumbed down in the last couple of decades, Dumb and Dumber To could be exhibit A".

The lengthy gestation period hasn't resulted in an appreciably upgraded experience.

— James Berardinelli, ReelViews

David Ehrlich of Time Out New York gave the film three out of five stars: "Dumb and Dumber To may not be quite as funny as the first one, but it's the funniest thing the Farrellys have made since". A.A. Dowd of The A.V. Club, gave the film D+ and wrote: "A sequel as desperate, in its own "official" way, as the knockoff-brand origin story that previously besmirched the franchise name". Critic Mick LaSalle of San Francisco Chronicle scored the film one out of four stars, asking: "Is this worse for Jim Carrey or Jeff Daniels? That's the sort of question that comes to mind while not laughing at Dumb and Dumber To". Manohla Dargis of The New York Times wrote that "the Farrellys are still not much interested in film as a visual medium, and when Lloyd and Harry aren't smacking each other or dropping their pants, you might as well be listening to a radio play". The Boston Globe's critic Ty Burr gave the film two-and-a-half stars out of four: "Everyone has piled into this dumber, sillier, more consistently funny reprise with an enthusiasm that's infectious, and not in a low-grade medical way". Tom Long of The Detroit News gave the film a B+.

Betsy Sharkey of the Los Angeles Times wrote: "What felt fresh in Peter and Bobby Farrelly's original Dumb and Dumber, with the Carrey-Daniels dense duo channeling the Stooges and Jerry Lewis and something else entirely, feels strangely old-fashioned two decades later". Stephanie Zacharek of The Village Voice wrote that "Dumb and Dumber To is mostly just a kick in the nuts, and not the good kind -- provided there is a good kind". Liam Lacey of The Globe and Mail gave the film two out of four stars and concluded: "Over all, the movie is just funny enough to make you wish it were much better than it is". The Star-Ledger's Stephen Whitty gave the film one and a half out of four stars: "The majority of it isn't just dumb and dumber, or even crude and cruder. At nearly two hours, it's just dull - and duller". David Edelstein of New York magazine wrote: "I reckon four out of every five jokes played to silence at the preview screening. If Dumb and Dumber To were a live comedian, he'd have said, 'Is this an audience or an oil painting?' He'd have left the stage in tears". Wesley Morris of Grantland observed that "the directors Bobby and Peter Farrelly cram the movie with puns and those kinds of sight gags. Almost none of them work". Critic Peter Travers of Rolling Stone gave the film one-and-a-half stars out of four.

For Robbie Collin in The Daily Telegraph it started promisingly:

Within moments, the joke is spent ... Here, as throughout the film, every punchline is followed by a quiet pause for audience laughter, the lengths of which might kindly be described as optimistic. ... There are scattered moments of inspiration ... But far more often, the comedy's just spiteful, sour or sloppily executed—or, in the case of a running joke about the hideous middle-agedness of Kathleen Turner's character, the mother of Harry's daughter, all three at once.

Mark Kermode, writing in The Observer, "counted a mere three chuckles (one of which I'm fairly sure was unintentional), leaving this several smiles shy of even the widely panned 2003 prequel Dumb and Dumberer: When Harry Met Lloyd". The Guardian's Peter Bradshaw found "the movie does deliver some laughs, and the climactic scene in which the two low-IQ boys succeed in infiltrating the equivalent of a TED talk is enjoyably bizarre", but concluded: "It's a rental, rather than a visit to the cinema".

=== Accolades ===
Award	Category	Recipient	Result
Golden Schmoes Awards	Biggest Disappointment of the Year	Dumb and Dumber To	Nominated
Golden Trailer Awards	Best Teaser Poster	Dumb and Dumber To	Nominated
Houston Film Critics Society Awards	Worst Film	Dumb and Dumber To	Nominated
Teen Choice Awards	Choice Movie: Comedy	Dumb and Dumber To	Nominated
Teen Choice Awards	Choice Movie Actor: Comedy	Jim Carrey	Nominated
Teen Choice Awards	Choice Movie: Chemistry	Jim Carrey and Jeff Daniels	Nominated
Women Film Critics Circle Awards	Worst Male Images in a Movie	Dumb and Dumber To	Won

== Future ==
Directors Peter Farrelly and Jeff Daniels have expressed interest in making a third film. In 2023, it was reported that a sequel to Dumb and Dumber To was in the works starring Carrey and Daniels.
