= Celebrate (Empire of the Sun song) =

Single by Empire of the Sun

from the album Ice on the Dune
- Released: 14 February 2014
- Genre: Dance-pop; electropop
- Length: 3:19
- Label: Capitol
- Songwriters: Luke Steele; Nick Littlemore; Daniel Johns; Scott Horscroft; Peter Mayes
- Producers: Empire of the Sun; Peter Mayes; Donnie Sloan

Empire of the Sun singles chronology
"DNA" (2013)	"Celebrate" (2014)	"High and Low" (2016)

Music video
- "Celebrate" on YouTube

"Celebrate" is a song by Australian electronic music duo Empire of the Sun. It was released as the third and final single from their second studio album, Ice on the Dune, on 14 February 2014. It was co-written by the band's members Luke Steele and Nick Littlemore with Daniel Johns, Peter Mayes and Scott Horscroft. It was remixed by various artists and two digital remixes were released in February.

== Reception ==
Marissa Muller from Rolling Stone called the song "the highlight" from the Ice on the Dune album. 4ZZZ said, "EOTS hit the dance floor with this electro-pop single. All the pump, falsetto and Ratatat-esque synths to sink your stereosonic-teeth into."

== Music video ==
The music video was filmed in South Korea in 2014 and saw Luke Steele walking around the streets of Seoul.

James Grebey from Spin magazine said: "It's a pretty upbeat look for a pretty upbeat song."

== Track listing ==
1. "Celebrate" (radio mix) – 3:25
2. "Celebrate" (Tommy Trash Club Mix) – 5:37
3. "Celebrate" (Steve Aoki Remix) – 4:30
