= DNA (Empire of the Sun song) =

Single by Empire of the Sun

from the album Ice on the Dune
- Released: September 5, 2013 (Single release); September 24, 2013 (Remix EP release)
- Genre: Dance-pop; electropop
- Length: 3:54
- Label: Capitol
- Songwriters: Luke Steele; Nick Littlemore; John Hill; Peter Mayes; Donnie Sloan
- Producers: Empire of the Sun; Peter Mayes; Donnie Sloan

Empire of the Sun singles chronology
"Alive" (2013)	"DNA" (2013)	"Celebrate" (2013)

Music video
- "DNA" on YouTube

"DNA" is a song by Australian electronic music duo Empire of the Sun. It was released as the second single from their second studio album, Ice on the Dune on 5 September 2013.

== Track listing ==
Digital download
No.	Title	Length
1.	"DNA"	3:54

Remixes EP
No.	Title	Length
1.	"DNA" (Calvin Harris Remix)	3:37
2.	"DNA" (Alex Metric Remix)	5:41
3.	"DNA" (Brodinski Remix)	4:33
4.	"DNA" (Yuksek Remix)	4:52
5.	"DNA" (Ta-Ku Remix)	3:32
6.	"DNA" (The Aston Shuffle Remix)	6:16

== Charts ==
=== Weekly charts ===
Chart (2013)	Peak position
Belgium (Ultratip Flanders)	26
US Hot Dance/Electronic Songs (Billboard)	26

=== Year-end charts ===
Chart (2013)	Position
US Hot Dance/Electronic Songs (Billboard)	88
