= Power Surge (water ride) =

Defunct water ride

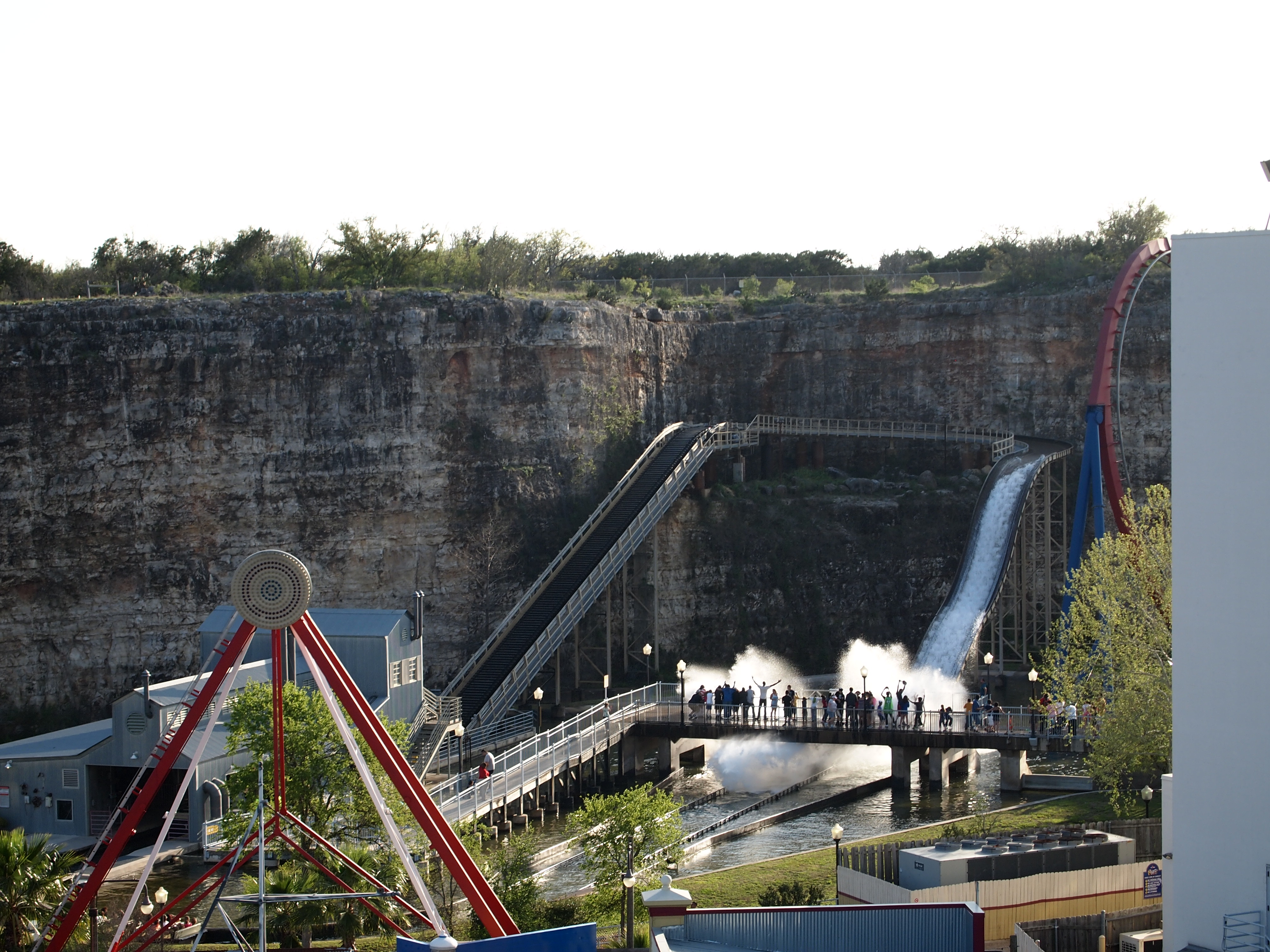

Six Flags Fiesta Texas
- Area: Rockville
- Status: Removed
- Opening date: March 14, 1992
- Closing date: July 23, 2017
- Replaced by: Wonder Woman Golden Lasso Coaster

General statistics
- Type: Shoot the Chute
- Manufacturer: Intamin
- Model: Shoot the Chute
- Height: 50 ft (15 m)
- Length: 808 ft (246 m)
- Speed: 36 mph (58 km/h)
- Duration: 2:34
- Height restriction: 42 in (107 cm)

Power Surge was a shoot-the-chutes water attraction designed by Intamin located at Six Flags Fiesta Texas in San Antonio, Texas that opened with the park on March 14, 1992. In mid-July 2017, park officials announced that it would retire on July 23. Safety issues were not a factor in removing the ride. The ride closed permanently on July 23, 2017.

On August 3, 2017, it was announced that the ride would be replaced with a new roller coaster named Wonder Woman Golden Lasso Coaster. It was the first single rail coaster built by Rocky Mountain Construction, and opened in May 2018. The support structure and other remnants of Power Surge can still be visible from its successor.

== Ride ==
Nestled along a quarry wall that overlooked the Rockville area of the park, Power Surge transported a dozen riders at a time along a channel against an old power plant backdrop. It ended in a steep 50 feet (15 m) plunge, with a double-dip going 36 miles per hour (58 km/h). It operated each year from opening day to Fright Fest.

== In popular culture ==
The ride was featured in the 1994 movie, Blank Check, where Preston Waters (Brian Bonsall) watches the boat coming down the drop while on the bridge, then gets soaked with his cotton candy by the boat splashing down.
