= Brady Bluhm =

American child actor (born Jul 6, 1983)

Brady Bluhm (born July 6, 1983) is an American former child actor. He provided the voice of Christopher Robin in a number of Winnie the Pooh projects from 1997 to 2005, as well as the bit role of Billy in 4C in the Dumb and Dumber franchise, as a child in the original 1994 film, returning to acting for a cameo appearance, at age 30, in the 2014 sequel. He also had a prominent supporting role in the TV series Get a Life.

Bluhm is a former member of the Church of Jesus Christ of Latter-day Saints and served an LDS Mission in Concepción, Chile. Since 2008, after returning from his mission then returning briefly to voice acting, he has worked as a security systems salesman. As of 2019, he resides in Rancho Cucamonga, California with his wife, Abbie, and their two children.

== Filmography ==
=== Film ===
Year	Film	Role	Notes
1990	Burning Bridges	Eli Hollinger	
1994	Dumb and Dumber	Billy in 4C	
1995	The Crazysitter	Jason Van Aresdale	
1996	Alone in the Woods	Justin Rogers	
1997	The Dog of Flanders	Nello	Direct-to-video (voice)
1997	Pooh's Grand Adventure: The Search for Christopher Robin	Christopher Robin	Direct-to-video (voice)
1999	Winnie the Pooh: Seasons of Giving	Christopher Robin	Direct-to-video (voice)
2014	Dumb and Dumber To	Billy in 4C	

=== Television ===
Year	Show	Role	Notes
1989	Doogie Howser, M.D.	Bobby Iger	Episode: "Simply Irresistible"
1990–1991	Get a Life	Bobby Potter	13 episodes (4 appearances, 9 "credit only")
1991	Designing Women	Boy	Episode: "The Emperor's New Nose"
1992	Life Goes On	Boy	Episode: "Confessions"
1992	Empty Nest	Matt	2 episodes
1992	Roseanne	Trick-or-Treater	Episode: "Halloween IV"
1993	The Ben Stiller Show	Kevvy	2 episodes
1993	Walker, Texas Ranger	Archie	Episode: "Family Matters"
1994	Baywatch	Jackson Harris	Episode: "Western Exposure"
1994	Murphy Brown	Timmy	Episode: "Brown in Toyland"
1994	In Search of Dr. Seuss	Marco	TV movie
1995	Star Trek: Voyager	Latika	Episode: "Time and Again"
1998	A Winnie the Pooh Thanksgiving	Christopher Robin	TV movie (voice)
1999	Clueless	Walter	2 episodes
1999	Winnie the Pooh: A Valentine for You	Christopher Robin	Television special (voice)
2001	CSI: Crime Scene Investigation	Alan	2 episodes
2002	Lloyd in Space	Various characters	3 episodes (voice)
2004	Rocket Power	Various characters	Episode: "Summer Breezy/Sammy's Fortune" (voice)
