= Log line =

Brief summary of a television program, film, or book

A log line or logline is a brief (usually one-sentence) summary of a television program, film, short film or book, that states the central conflict of the story, often providing both a synopsis of the story's plot, and an emotional "hook" to stimulate interest. A one-sentence program summary in TV Guide is a log line. "A log line is a single sentence describing your entire story," however, "it is not a straight summary of the project. It goes to the heart of what a project is about in one or two sentences, defining the theme of the project ... and suggest[ing] a bigger meaning." "A logline is a one-sentence summary of the story's main conflict. It is not a statement of theme but rather a premise."

"A logline ... helps content creators simply and easily sell their work in a single sentence, because the emphasis is on what makes their property unique ... the logline provides the content creator with a concise way to focus on the three main anchors of their writing," the protagonist, the protagonist's wants (goal(s) or desire(s)), and what is at stake (risks).

The term was introduced in 1982 to describe an entry in a television programming guide summarizing the plot of a show.

== Elements ==
Narrative elements often referenced in a logline include the setting, protagonist, antagonist, inciting incident, and a conflict and a goal (the conflict's resolution). Change, such as character growth, and action should be suggested. A log line should contain four facts: "the main character, what the main character wants," the villain(s) or obstacle(s), "standing in the way," and, "the unique aspect(s) of the story."

== Examples ==
Charlie Brown is finally invited to a Halloween party; Snoopy engages the Red Baron in a dogfight; and Linus waits patiently in the pumpkin patch for the Great Pumpkin.

— Logline for It's the Great Pumpkin, Charlie Brown

A talented but irresponsible teenager schemes to steal his college tuition money when his wealthy father refuses to pay for him to study acting at Juilliard.

— Logline for How I Paid for College: A Novel of Sex, Theft, Friendship, and Musical Theater

== See also ==
- High concept
- Save the Cat!
