= Memory Run =

- Directed by: Allan A. Goldstein
- Written by: Allan A. Goldstein; David N. Gottlieb
- Starring: Karen Duffy; Matt McCoy
- Release date: 1995
- Running time: 89 minutes
- Country: United States
- Language: English

Memory Run, also known as Synapse, is a 1995 action film set in the year 2015, starring Karen Duffy. It is based on the novel Season of the Witch (1968), published by Jean Marie Stine under her former name Hank Stine.

== Plot ==
The year is 2015 and Big Brother is everywhere. The search for immortality is over. Science has finally achieved the impossible, undermining that most basic aspect of life: Mind, Body and Soul must be united. Those who benefit from this new technology will wake up to a new and youthful beginning - the rest of humankind must live a bad dream and wake up to a living nightmare that goes beyond life, beyond death, and beyond redemption.
