= Cold Feet (1983 film) =

- Directed by: Bruce Van Dusen
- Written by: Bruce Van Dusen
- Produced by: Charles B. Wessler
- Starring: Griffin Dunne
- Cinematography: Benjamin Blake
- Edited by: Sally Menke
- Music by: Todd Rundgren
- Release date: 1983
- Language: English

Cold Feet is a 1983 American comedy film written and directed by Bruce Van Dusen and starring Griffin Dunne.

== Plot ==
Cold Feet is a romantic comedy-drama about a young man named Monty (Griffin Dunne), who is deeply in love with his fiancée, Deirdre (Marissa Chibas). Set in New York City, the film follows Monty as he experiences a severe case of "cold feet" just days before his wedding. Although he is excited about marrying Deirdre, he is overwhelmed by doubts and fears about committing to a lifetime with one person.

== Cast ==
- Griffin Dunne as Tom Christo
- Marissa Chibas as Marty Fenton
- Blanche Baker as Leslie Christo
- Marc Cronogue as Bill
- Kurt Knudson as Louis
- Joseph Leon as Harold Fenton
- Marcia Jean Kurtz as Psychiatrist
- Peter Boyden as Dr. Birbrower
- Dan Strickler as TV Executive
