= Blank Check (film) =

1994 film by Rupert Wainwright

- Theatrical release poster
- Directed by: Rupert Wainwright
- Written by: Colby Carr; Blake Snyder
- Produced by: Tony Shimkin; Gary Adelson; Craig Baumgarten
- Starring: Brian Bonsall; Karen Duffy; Miguel Ferrer; James Rebhorn; Tone Lōc; Jayne Atkinson; Michael Lerner
- Cinematography: Bill Pope
- Edited by: Jill Savitt; Hubert de la Bouillerie
- Music by: Nicholas Pike
- Production company: Walt Disney Pictures
- Distributed by: Buena Vista Pictures Distribution
- Release date: February 11, 1994
- Running time: 93 minutes
- Country: United States
- Language: English
- Budget: $10 million
- Box office: $30.8 million

Blank Check (in the United Kingdom originally released as Blank Cheque) is a 1994 American comedy film directed by Rupert Wainwright and starring Brian Bonsall, Karen Duffy, Miguel Ferrer, James Rebhorn, Tone Lōc, Jayne Atkinson and Michael Lerner. It was released on February 11, 1994, by Walt Disney Pictures. The film follows a boy who receives a blank check and uses it to buy a house under an alter ego but is soon being searched for by several members of the bank he cashed it under.

The film received negative reviews but grossed $30.8 million domestically and has become a 1990s cult classic due to its pure kid-wish-fulfillment premise.

== Plot ==
11-year-old Preston Waters laments his relative lack of money compared to his two entrepreneurial older brothers and his white collar father, Fred, an office worker who is very cheap. Preston regularly experiences humiliating situations including having his brothers, 16-year-old Damian and 15-year-old Ralph, invade his bedroom to use as an office for their home business, as well as attending a birthday at an amusement park yet only having enough money for the smaller rides.

On his birthday, Preston receives a blank check from his grandmother. Fred fills the amount out for $11 and Preston takes it to the bank to open an account but is told that he requires $200 minimum. On his way home, he gets involved in a bike accident with escaped convict Carl Quigley, who had just left a Zero Halliburton briefcase containing $1,000,000 in stolen cash in the care of bank president Edward H. Biderman to be laundered and retrieved by an associate the next day. Afraid of drawing attention from the police, Quigley hastily hands Preston a signed blank check and flees the scene.

Preston uses his brothers' computer to fill out the check himself for $1,000,000 ($2,260,323 in current dollar terms) and attempts to cash it the next day. He is taken to Biderman, who believes Preston is the associate named "Juice" that Quigley told him he was sending. Believing this is part of Quigley's plan, Biderman fills Preston's backpack with $1,000,000 in clean money and Preston leaves the bank just as the real Juice arrives for the money. An angered Quigley sets out to find Preston with Juice hoping to reclaim his stolen money and threatens Biderman's family with death unless he comes along. Meanwhile, Preston goes on a spending spree, purchasing a large house and a limousine service with a chauffeur named Henry, and then fills the house with toys, gadgets, and electronics all in the name of a mysterious employer he creates named "Macintosh", after his brothers' computer. Preston uses a computer program called MacSpeak as the voice of Mr. Macintosh when he needs to conduct business over the phone, otherwise Preston presents himself as Mr. Macintosh's assistant.

Shay Stanley, a teller from the bank who is really an undercover FBI agent that is investigating Biderman for money laundering, seeks out Preston and his employer Mr. Macintosh, after the realtor who sold the house to Macintosh deposits $300,000 cash with her bank. Suspicious of the sudden flow of cash that has come through Biderman's bank, she follows the trail to Preston/Macintosh. Denied a meeting with Macintosh, Preston claims that he handles some of Macintosh's financial affairs, and the two end up going on a business date. Later, Preston throws an expensive birthday party for himself and Macintosh, which he later finds out he can't pay for since he only has $332.17 left in his account.

Still checking on the computer, Fred shows up to the party. He admits to Macintosh (Preston hidden behind a chair) that he doesn't want to lose Preston, and requests that he lets him go early to celebrate his birthday. When Preston tells the planner that Macintosh has left and there is no more money, she shuts the party down, leaving Preston alone in the empty house. Quigley, Biderman, and Juice arrive, only to find out Preston has spent all of it in six days. Preston escapes, and the three pursue him throughout the property. Although Preston manages to fend off his pursuers by using his various purchases, they eventually catch up to him, but the FBI shows up with Shay in time to save him.

Quigley announces that he is Macintosh, thinking that assuming the false identity would grant him the new life he was seeking after escaping prison. However, the FBI arrest Quigley for numerous crimes they intended to charge Macintosh with, along with Biderman and Juice as accomplices. Preston bids Henry farewell and shares a goodbye kiss with Shay before returning to his family to celebrate his birthday, now understanding that money cannot buy happiness and that family is what matters most.

== Cast ==
- Brian Bonsall as Preston Waters / Mr. Macintosh
- Karen Duffy as Shay Stanley
- Miguel Ferrer as Carl Quigley
- Michael Lerner as Edward Biderman
- Tone Lōc as Juice
- James Rebhorn as Fred Waters
- Jayne Atkinson as Sandra Waters
- Rick Ducommun as Henry
- Debbie Allen as Yvonne
- Chris Demetral as Damian Waters
- Michael Faustino as Ralph Waters
- Alex Zuckerman as Butch

== Production ==
In April 1993, it was reported that Walt Disney Pictures had acquired Blake Snyder and Colby Carr's spec script Blank Check about a 9-year-old boy who is mistakenly given a signed blank check and fills it out for $1 million. The deal was secured two days after the script went out with the duo's representation sending the script in backpacks filled with fake money to high profile executives and producers such as Frank Marshall and Kathleen Kennedy at Paramount Pictures, Gale Anne Hurd at Universal Pictures, Cary Woods and Robert N. Fried at TriStar Pictures, and Michael Harpster at New Line Cinema. The following month, it was reported that Disney was planning to film the script in August of that year with a budget of around $10 million. Rupert Wainwright was hired as director in his feature debut having previously directed music videos for N.W.A and MC Hammer as well as the 1991 television film Dillinger, and said the aim was to cater to the same age range as Home Alone in the hopes of replicating its success.

Blank Check was filmed in Austin, San Antonio, and Dallas. The castle house that Preston buys was filmed at the Pemberton Castle (Fisher Gideon House) at 1415 Wooldridge Drive in Austin, a Texas Historical Landmark, which is now owned by filmmaker Robert Rodriguez. The theme park in the beginning of the movie was Six Flags Fiesta Texas; several of the park's attractions, including The Rattler and Power Surge, were filmed in this movie.

The bank featured in the movie is in the historic Alamo National Bank Building. The bank lobby was featured and it has a 23-story office tower above it. The building opened in 1929, and today houses the Drury Plaza Hotel.

== Reception ==
=== Box office ===
Blank Check debuted at number 3 at the US box office behind Ace Ventura: Pet Detective and The Getaway with $5.4 million in its opening weekend. The film grossed $30.8 million in the United States and Canada.

=== Critical reception ===
On the review aggregator website Rotten Tomatoes, 9% of 11 critics' reviews are positive, with an average rating of 3.3/10. Metacritic, which uses a weighted average, assigned the film a score of 42 out of 100, based on 9 critics, indicating "mixed or average" reviews. Audiences polled by CinemaScore gave the film an average grade of "A−" on an A+ to F scale.

Peter Rainer of the Los Angeles Times stated that what was "missing from this film is any trace of the joy in simple pleasures. Preston isn't a very imaginative child; he's a goodies gatherer." Janet Maslin of The New York Times said that it "looks like the best bet for family audiences in a season short on kiddie oriented entertainment. And it's a movie that no parents in their right minds should let children see."

The Chicago Tribune stated that "[w]ith its contrived plot, its MTV-inspired montages and its blatant shilling for products, it is film as hard sell, and it comes with a decidedly suspect warranty. Its mercantile instincts are so primary it looks like an infomercial."

==== Kissing controversy ====
Blank Check is controversial for a romantic scene featuring 11-year old Bonsall and 31-year old Duffy

The appropriateness of a scene depicting a kiss between Preston and Shay near the end of the film has been called into question, particularly with Shay's job as an agent with the FBI. The scene follows from an exchange where Shay asks Preston to "give [her] a call in, say, 10 years," to which Preston attempts to negotiate a shorter time, resulting in the compromise of 6 years. This would make Preston only 17 at the time of the reunion. Brian Bonsall was 11 years old at the time of filming, while Karen Duffy was 31.

In January 2017, Blank Check was made available on Netflix in the United States, which led many critics to review the film anew. Observer's Dana Schwartz claimed the kissing scene left her feeling "totally grossed out", while Kylie Queen from WJBQ described the act as "borderline pedophilia". Writing for PinkNews, Lily Wakefield criticized the Disney+ streaming service for not featuring the Love, Simon spinoff series Love, Victor, deeming it to be "too adult", but making Blank Check available to view with the kissing scene still intact.

Bonsall has looked back upon the film fondly and disagreed with calls for it to be removed from Disney+. Bonsall's mother Kathleen clarified that no abuse went on on set, claiming "You don’t need to worry about a THING NOT YOURS SON. [sic]"

=== Year-end lists ===
- 1st worst – Melinda Miller, The Buffalo News
- Worst (not ranked) – Bob Ross, The Tampa Tribune
