= Alive (Empire of the Sun song) =

Single by Empire of the Sun

from the album Ice on the Dune
- Released: 15 April 2013
- Recorded: 2009–2012
- Genre: Electropop; dance-pop
- Length: 3:24
- Label: Capitol
- Songwriters: Luke Steele; Nick Littlemore; Jonathon Sloan; Peter Mayes; Steven Bach
- Producers: Empire of the Sun; Donnie Sloan; Peter Mayes

Empire of the Sun singles chronology
"Half Mast (Slight Return)" (2010)	"Alive" (2013)	"DNA" (2013)

Music video
- "Alive" on YouTube

"Alive" is a song by Australian electronic music duo Empire of the Sun. It was released on 15 April 2013 as the lead single from their second studio album, Ice on the Dune (2013).

The single was certified platinum both by the Australian Recording Industry Association and the Federation of the Italian Music Industry.

== Track listing ==
"Alive" – remixes
No.	Title	Length
1.	"Alive" (Zedd Remix)	3:46
2.	"Alive" (David Guetta Remix)	5:56
3.	"Alive" (M4SONIC Remix)	3:29
4.	"Alive" (Mat Zo Remix)	5:40
5.	"Alive" (Zedd Extended Remix)	4:43
6.	"Alive" (Gold Fields Remix)	5:20

== Music video ==
The music video for the song has acquired widespread notice. Directed by Alex Theurer and Charles Scott from Kelvin Optical, Inc., a division of J. J. Abrams' Bad Robot Productions. It features science fiction costumes and was filmed in Bryce Canyon National Park and the redwoods of California.

The animation starting at (0:45) depicts both singers standing on a rock tower, which is Spider Rock in Canyon de Chelly located on the Navajo Nation in Arizona

== Usage in media ==
It is featured in the football video game FIFA 14, the films Dumb and Dumber To, Paranoia, Endless Love, Alpha and Omega 4: The Legend of the Saw Tooth Cave, The Hero of Color City, Tony Robbins: I Am Not Your Guru, Bring Her Back and Jexi, and the TV shows Camp, The Vampire Diaries and The Voice, The song was playing in some stadiums.

== Charts ==
=== Weekly charts ===
Chart (2013)	Peak position
Australia (ARIA)	22
Austria (Ö3 Austria Top 40)	16
Belgium (Ultratip Bubbling Under Flanders)	13
Belgium (Ultratip Bubbling Under Wallonia)	13
Czech Republic Airplay (ČNS IFPI)	44
France (SNEP)	32
Germany (GfK)	39
Ireland (IRMA)	39
Israel (Media Forest)	2
Mexico Ingles Airplay (Billboard)	43
Netherlands (Single Top 100)	94
Slovenia (SloTop50)	27
Switzerland (Schweizer Hitparade)	25
UK Singles (OCC)	83
US Dance Club Songs (Billboard)	1
US Dance/Mix Show Airplay (Billboard)	13
US Hot Rock Songs (Billboard)	26

=== Year-end charts ===
Chart (2013)	Position
Italy (FIMI)	51
US Dance/Mix Show Airplay (Billboard)	44
US Hot Rock Songs (Billboard)	78

== Certifications ==
Region	Certification	Certified units/sales
Australia (ARIA)	5× Platinum	350,000^{‡}
Brazil (Pro-Música Brasil)	Gold	30,000^{‡}
Canada (Music Canada)	Platinum	80,000^{‡}
Italy (FIMI)	Platinum	30,000^{*}
New Zealand (RMNZ)	Platinum	30,000^{‡}
United Kingdom (BPI)	Silver	200,000^{‡}
United States (RIAA)	Gold	500,000^{‡}
^{*} Sales figures based on certification alone.^{‡} Sales+streaming figures based on certification alone.

== See also ==
- List of number-one dance singles of 2013 (U.S.)
