= Karen Duffy =

American model, actress (born 1962)

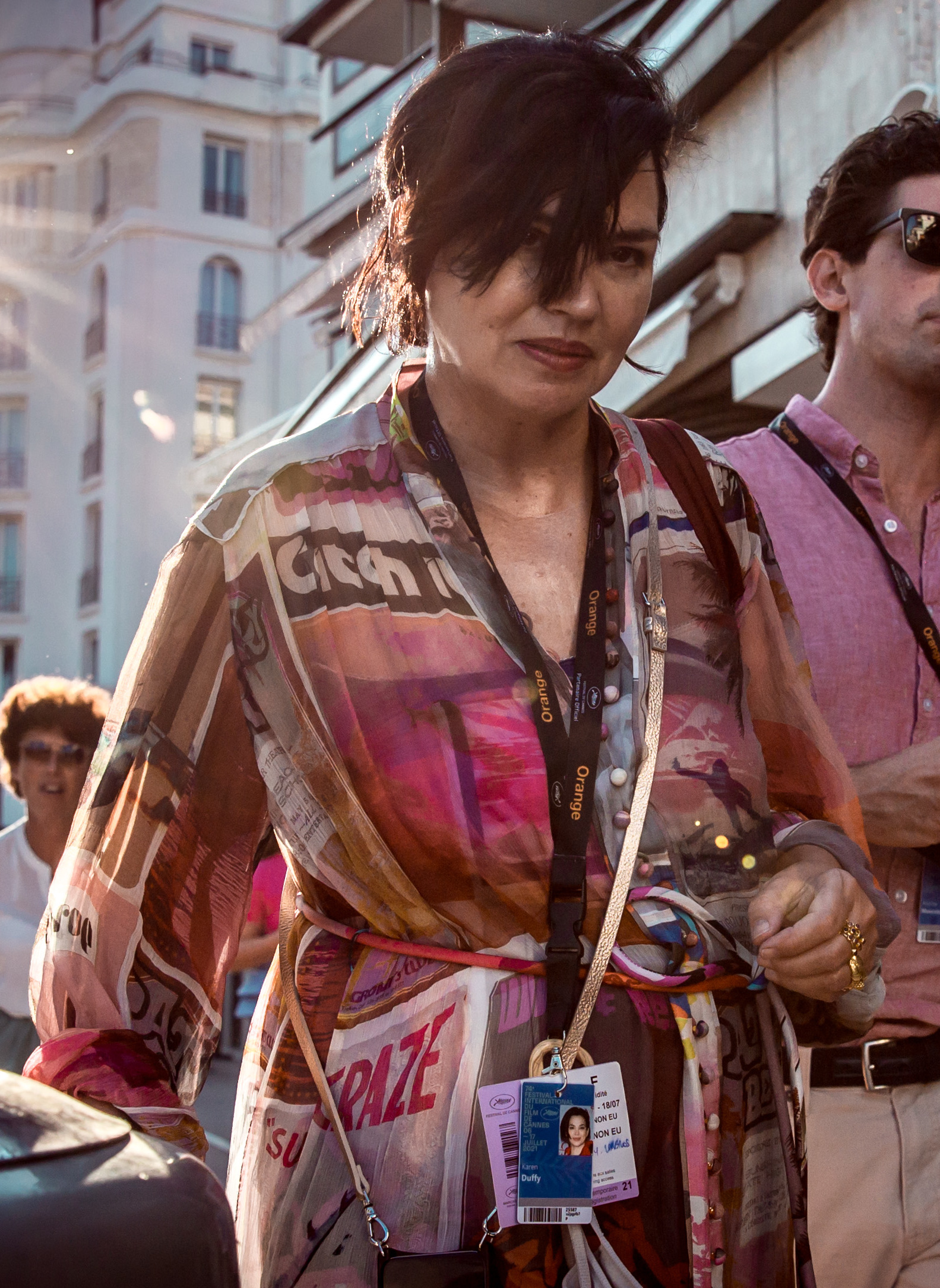
- Duffy in 2021
- Born: May 23, 1962 (age 64); New York, New York, U.S.
- Education: University of Colorado at Boulder
- Occupations: Writer, model, actress, television personality
- Years active: 1989–present
- Spouse: John Lambros (m. 1997)
- Children: 1

Karen "Duff" Duffy (born May 23, 1962) is an American writer, model, television personality, and actress. She is a certified hospital chaplain, a former Coney Island Mermaid Queen, and one of People Magazine's "50 Most Beautiful Women" in 1993. In 1995, Duffy was diagnosed with a rare form of the disease sarcoidosis called neurosarcoidosis. Now retired from acting, Duffy has written two books about her experience living with chronic pain and is a member of the Alliance for the Ethical Treatment of Pain Patients.

== Early life ==
Duffy was raised Catholic, and is of Irish ancestry. She attended Park Ridge High School in Park Ridge, New Jersey, graduating in 1979. She received a bachelor's degree in recreational therapy from the University of Colorado Boulder.

== Film and television career ==
By 1989, Duffy was modeling and appearing in television commercials. Her big break came when she auditioned and was selected as a VJ for the MTV network in the early 1990s, working at the network from 1991 - 1995 under the name "Duff." She appeared in small roles in a handful of films including Dumb and Dumber and Blank Check, and by 1995 was working as a correspondent for documentary filmmaker Michael Moore on his television shows TV Nation and The Awful Truth. She also was a Revlon "Charlie Girl" as well as the face of Almay Cosmetics, and co-hosted the pay-per-view television event, Elvis: The Tribute from the Memphis Pyramid in 1994 with Kris Kristofferson.

In 2006, Duffy hosted House of Tiny Terrors on TLC. On July 7, 2007, she appeared on the Live Earth telecast on the Bravo Channel as a co-host at Giants Stadium, East Rutherford, New Jersey.

In 2008, Duffy began working with New York City's NYC Media on a series of emergency preparedness videos. The videos, which mimic the style of the network TV show Secrets of New York, help raise awareness of the perils of natural disasters and preventative actions families should take to prepare for them.

== Writing and speaking on sarcoidosis ==
In 1995, Duffy was diagnosed with a rare form of the disease sarcoidosis called neurosarcoidosis. Her brain and spinal cord were affected, leaving her partially paralyzed.

Duffy is the author of the New York Times bestselling memoir Model Patient: My Life as an Incurable Wise-Ass. In her latest book, Backbone: Living With Chronic Pain Without Turning Into One, she describes her ongoing incurable disease and constant pain, using humor and acceptance of her condition to cope. She was inspired to write the second book by Lord Byron, who wrote "Always laugh when you can, it is cheap medicine."

Her articles, on a range of subjects, have appeared in media outlets, including The New York Times and Oprah Magazine. She spoke at the 2018 US Pain Foundation annual gala.

== Personal life ==
She married John Lambros in 1997. They have one son, who was born via surrogate in 2003. On Boston comedian Ken Reid's podcast, Duffy stated she's a devout Catholic.

== Filmography ==
| Year | Title | Role | Notes |
|---|---|---|---|
| 1991 | McBain | Crack Den Girl | Film Debut |
| 1991 | 29th Street | Maria Rios | |
| 1992 | Malcolm X | Sophia's Friend | |
| 1993 | Who's the Man? | Officer Day | |
| 1993 | Last Action Hero | Herself | |
| 1994 | Blank Check | Shay Stanley | |
| 1994 | Reality Bites | Elaina (actress) | |
| 1994 | Dumb and Dumber | J.P. Shay | |
| 1996 | Memory Run | Celeste/Josette | |
| 1997 | Nothing Sacred | Cassandra Krauser | |
| 1997 | Fool's Paradise | DJ | |
| 1997 | Meet Wally Sparks | Reporter #3 | |
| 1998 | Celebrity | TV Reporter at Premiere | |
| 1999 | The 24 Hour Woman | Margo Lynn | |
| 2002 | A Smile Gone, But Where | Woman | |
| 2006 | Crafty | Host | TV movie |
| 2009 | Fantastic Mr. Fox | Linda Otter | Voice |
Television
| Year | Title | Role | Notes |
| 1991 | Fade to Black | Unknown Role | Unknown episode(s) |
| 1997 | The Big Easy | Wanda Fallon | 1 episode |
| 1998–2000 | Pepper Ann | Sketch (voice) | 3 episodes |
| 2018 | The Real Housewives of New York City | Herself | 1 episode (10.07 "On An Island") |

== Bibliography ==
- Karen Duffy. Model Patient: My Life as an Incurable Wise-Ass. 2001. ISBN 0-06-095727-1.
- Karen Duffy. A Slob in the Kitchen. 2004. ISBN 1-4000-5115-0.
- Karen Duffy. Backbone: Living With Chronic Pain Without Turning Into One. ISBN 1628727950
