= Charles B. Wessler =

American film producer

- Born: May 16, 1955 (age 71); United States
- Occupation: Film producer
- Notable work: There's Something About Mary

Charles B. Wessler (born May 16, 1955) is an American film producer best known for his collaborations with the Farrelly brothers.

== Career ==
Wessler's first job was as a production assistant on the film Can I Do It... 'Til I Need Glasses? (1977). He was also a production assistant for George Lucas on The Empire Strikes Back (1980) and Return of the Jedi (1983).

Wessler spent time working at The Ladd Company for Alan Ladd Jr. and at Zoetrope Studios with Francis Ford Coppola. He soon moved on to produce specials for HBO where he hired Peter Farrelly and Bennett Yellin to write a script for the 1987 special, Paul Reiser Out on a Whim. Wessler, Peter Farrelly and Bobby Farrelly went on to develop several scripts together. Their first feature film was Dumb and Dumber (1994) for New Line Cinema. In 1998, he was nominated for the Golden Globe Award for Best Motion Picture – Musical or Comedy for producing There's Something About Mary.

Wessler's other producing credits include It's Pat, Bushwhacked, Me, Myself & Irene, Shallow Hal and Stuck on You and The Heartbreak Kid (2007). His 2010s films included Hall Pass, The Three Stooges (2012), Movie 43 (2013), Dumb and Dumber To (2014).

In 2018 Wessler produced Green Book, directed by Peter Farrelly. The film won numerous awards, including: the Toronto International Film Festival's People Choice Award, Golden Globe Award for Best Motion Picture - Musical or Comedy, Producers Guild of America Award for Best Theatrical Motion Picture, honoree of American Film Institute Movies Of The Year, and the Academy Award for Best Picture.

== Filmography ==
=== Film ===
Year	Film	Credit
1983	Cold Feet	
1994	It's Pat	
1994	Dumb and Dumber	
1995	Bushwhacked	
1997	The Locusts	Executive producer
1998	There's Something About Mary	
2000	Me, Myself & Irene	Executive producer
2000	Bachelor #2	
2001	Shallow Hal	
2003	Dumb and Dumberer: When Harry Met Lloyd	
2003	Stuck on You	
2007	The Heartbreak Kid	Executive producer
2011	Hall Pass	
2012	The Three Stooges	
2013	Movie 43	
2014	Dumb and Dumber To	
2018	Green Book	
2021	Palmer	

Miscellaneous crew

Year	Film	Role	Notes
1977	Can I Do It... 'Til I Need Glasses?	Production assistant	
1979	Chilly Scenes of Winter	Production assistant	
1980	The Empire Strikes Back	Production assistant	
1982	Hammett	Production aide	
1983	Return of the Jedi	Production assistant	Uncredited

Actor

Year	Film	Role	Notes
2013	Movie 43	Himself	Uncredited

As writer

Year	Film
2003	Stuck on You

Thanks

Year	Film	Role
1992	A League of Their Own	Thanks
2017	Fun Mom Dinner	Special thanks
2019	The Last Laugh	Special thanks

=== Television ===
Year	Title	Notes
1985	From Here to Maternity	Television pilot
1987	Paul Reiser: Out on a Whim	Television special

Miscellaneous crew

Year	Title	Role
1995−96	Dumb and Dumber	Creative consultant

As director

Year	Title
2002	Nero Wolfe
