= Dumb and Dumberer: When Harry Met Lloyd =

2003 American comedy film directed by Troy Miller

- Theatrical release poster
- Directed by: Troy Miller
- Screenplay by: Troy Miller; Robert Brener
- Story by: Robert Brener
- Based on: Characters by Peter Farrelly; Bennett Yellin; Bobby Farrelly
- Produced by: Oren Koules; Charles B. Wessler; Brad Krevoy; Steve Stabler; Troy Miller
- Starring: Eric Christian Olsen; Derek Richardson; Cheri Oteri; Luis Guzmán; Elden Henson; William Lee Scott; Mimi Rogers; Eugene Levy
- Cinematography: Anthony B. Richmond
- Edited by: Lawrence Jordan
- Music by: Eban Schletter
- Production companies: Burg/Koules Productions; Dakota Pictures; Avery Pix
- Distributed by: New Line Cinema
- Release date: June 13, 2003
- Running time: 85 minutes
- Country: United States
- Language: English
- Budget: $19 million
- Box office: $39.3 million

Dumb and Dumberer: When Harry Met Lloyd is a 2003 American buddy comedy film directed by Troy Miller from a screenplay by Miller and Robert Brener. It is the second installment in the Dumb and Dumber franchise and a prequel to the 1994 film Dumb and Dumber. Depicting the original film's characters during their high school years, it stars Derek Richardson and Eric Christian Olsen in the title roles. The film was released by New Line Cinema on June 13, 2003, to negative reviews and grossed $39.3 million against a $19 million budget.

== Plot ==
In 1986, Harry Dunne finally gets his chance to go to regular high school. At the same time, Lloyd Christmas has been adopted and exchanged several times until he is finally accepted by the school janitor, Ray. Harry bumps into Lloyd on the way to school and, like destiny, they instantly became best friends. Lloyd introduces Harry to his "friend" Turk, the school bully, who lives for torturing him. After putting Lloyd in a trash can, he hoists them up a flagpole.

Meanwhile, the corrupt Principal Collins is seeking a way to get a chunk of money to buy a condo in Waikīkī, for him and his girlfriend, Ms. Heller, the school's cafeteria lady. Seeing Harry and Lloyd up the flagpole, Principal Collins decides to establish a fake "special needs" class to swindle $100,000 from a former special needs student, Richard Moffit. Harry and Lloyd are thrilled to help, unaware of the real reason, and thus find themselves signing up people they consider "special" enough for the class. These include a reluctant Turk; Toby, who broke his leg and arm in a skateboarding accident—and whom Lloyd sees as a "little crippled boy"; Toby's gorgeous girlfriend, Terri; geeky Lewis, whom Harry and Lloyd believe is a centaur after seeing him half-dressed in his horse mascot uniform; Cindy, aka "Ching-Chong", a Chinese exchange student who later becomes Turk's girlfriend; and Carl, a badly injured football player obsessed with his sport. Ms. Heller becomes the fake class's teacher and holds it in Ray's tool shed.

Jessica Matthews, a headstrong reporter for the school paper, is suspicious of Principal Collins' sudden contribution. Inviting Harry over for dinner, she asks him for information. He, believing she is flirting with him, turns to Lloyd for courtship tips. A disaster involving Jessica's bathroom and a melted chocolate bar that looks like feces makes her father, Walter, freak out, inadvertently directing her attention to Lloyd. Soon, Harry and Lloyd fight over Jessica, which causes them to break off their friendship. They shortly make amends upon realizing they are nothing without each other. They take a chest from Principal Collins' office, which contains evidence of every scam he and Ms. Heller ever pulled, which could put them away for years.

The next day, Principal Collins finds the chest missing, and Ms. Heller falsely accuses Jessica of taking it. As a result, Principal Collins prank calls Jessica’s parents to keep her at his house overnight to interrogate her. Meanwhile, the special needs class builds a George Washington float for the Thanksgiving parade. However, after Harry and Lloyd discover the evidence in the chest, they transform the float to look like Principal Collins. After the class sees the evidence, they agree to use his likeness for the float instead. They also have the float pulled by the class' special bus.

Before bringing out the float, they call the police. During the parade, the superintendent of the school district has a police detective disguise himself as Richard Moffit, so Principal Collins will take the grant. The special needs class float proves that Principal Collins and Ms. Heller are thieves by playing their recordings over loudspeakers. Before Principal Collins and Ms. Heller can escape with the money, they are arrested by the police. Jessica is grateful for Harry and Lloyd and regards them as heroes, but just as in the original film, the duo's advances to Jessica are in vain, as she has a boyfriend. He commends Harry and Lloyd for exposing Collins and Heller's plot and rides off with Jessica.

Harry and Lloyd vow never to fight and risk their friendship over a woman, but as they head home, they are approached by Fraida Felcher and her twin sister, Rita, in a red Ferrari 308 GTS, who offer to take them to visit a new girls' college. After Harry and Lloyd debate over which girl they want, Lloyd declines the offer to settle the debate, so Fraida and Rita furiously drive off, splattering Harry with mud in the process. Walter accidentally hits Harry with his Mercedes-Benz W126, resulting in Harry getting the windshield and hood covered with mud. Walter recognizes Harry and as he frantically thinks his car is covered in feces, Harry and Lloyd casually walk away at the end of the film.

== Cast ==
- Derek Richardson as Harry Dunne
  - Lucas Gregory as young Harry Dunne
- Eric Christian Olsen as Lloyd Christmas
  - Colin Ford as young Lloyd Christmas
- Rachel Nichols as Jessica Matthews, Harry and Lloyd's crush who makes out with Mrs. Dunne during a make out contest for Lloyd in his dream
- Eugene Levy as Principal Collins
- Mimi Rogers as Mrs. Dunne, Harry's mother who makes out with Jessica during a make out contest for Lloyd in his dream
- Luis Guzman as Ray Christmas, the Janitor and Lloyd's father
- Cheri Oteri as Ms. Heller, Principal Collins' girlfriend
- Bob Saget as Walter Matthews, Jessica's father
- Julia Duffy as Mrs. Matthews, Jessica's mother
- Elden Henson as Turk "the school bully"
- Shia LaBeouf as Lewis
- William Lee Scott as Carl
- Michelle Krusiec as Cindy "Ching-Chong"
- Josh Braaten as Toby
- Teal Redmann as Terri
- Lin Shaye as Margie Neugeboren
- Julie Costello as Fraida Felcher
- Shawnie Costello as Rita Felcher
- Timothy Stack as doctor
- Brian Posehn as convenience store clerk Big "A"
- Vahe Manoukian as security guard

== Production ==
Much of the film was filmed in Atlanta. Many of the school scenes were filmed at Walton High School in Marietta and at the Atlanta International School in Fulton County. The Farrelly brothers, who co-wrote and directed the original Dumb and Dumber, had no involvement in this film whatsoever, nor did Jim Carrey or Jeff Daniels, who played Lloyd and Harry in the original film. Although Peter Farrelly has never seen the prequel, he went on record as saying that he holds no ill will against the film and wished the filmmakers well on it.

Following the success of South Park, co-creators Trey Parker and Matt Stone were originally slated to write the script for the film, but due to scheduling conflicts, by 2000 they opted out of the project and returned their salary to New Line Cinema. Adam Brody wanted to play the role of Lloyd Christmas.

== Release ==
=== Home media ===
Dumb and Dumberer: When Harry Met Lloyd was released on DVD and VHS on November 11, 2003 by New Line Home Entertainment.

== Reception ==
=== Box office ===
In its opening weekend, the film grossed $10.8 million in 2,609 theaters in the United States and Canada, ranking in sixth place behind Finding Nemo, 2 Fast 2 Furious, Bruce Almighty, Rugrats Go Wild and Hollywood Homicide. By the end of its run, Dumb and Dumberer: When Harry Met Lloyd grossed $26.3 million domestically and $13 million internationally for a worldwide total of $39.3 million, against a $19 million budget.

=== Critical reception ===
Review aggregation website Rotten Tomatoes gives it a 10% rating based on reviews from 119 critics, with an average score of 2.8/10. The site's critical consensus states: "This lame prequel induces more groans than laughs. Rent the original instead". Metacritic gives the film a score of 19 out of 100, based on reviews from 28 critics, indicating "overwhelming dislike".

=== Accolades ===
Award	Date of ceremony	Category	Recipients	Result
Golden Raspberry Awards	February 28, 2004	Worst Remake or Sequel		Nominated
Golden Raspberry Awards	February 28, 2004	Worst Screenplay	Robert Brener and Troy Miller	Nominated
Golden Raspberry Awards	February 28, 2004	Worst Screen Couple	Eric Christian Olsen and Derek Richardson	Nominated
Stinkers Bad Movie Awards	2004	Worst Picture		Nominated
Stinkers Bad Movie Awards	2004	Most Painfully Unfunny Not Canon Comedy		Nominated
