= Dalton E. Gray =

American actor (born 1997)

- Born: Dalton Edward Gray; June 4, 1997 (age 28); Houston, Texas, U.S.
- Occupation: Actor
- Years active: 2010–present

Dalton E. Gray (born June 4, 1997) is an American actor best known for his role as Mike in American Horror Story: Freak Show and Jack Colson for two seasons on HBO's Treme. In 2012, Dalton made his film debut in the WWE Studios produced thriller film No One Lives. In 2014, Dalton played a young Harry Dunn, Jeff Daniels' character, in Dumb and Dumber To. He also appeared in Revolution.

== Early life ==
Born to Cary and Lynnette Gray, Gray was raised in Katy, where he attended Katy Elementary, Katy Junior High, and one year at Katy High School, then went on to graduate from K-12 at the age of 16. He has one sister, Katy. Before Gray started acting, he was a national level motocross champion, winning over 200 1st place titles. After an injury and Gray being unable to race, he decided to give acting a try.

== Career ==
In 2012, after a few short films, Dalton made his film debut in the WWE Studios produced thriller film No One Lives. He then booked the role as Jack Colson, son of New Orleans detective Terry Colson (David Morse), in seasons 3 & 4 of HBO's Treme. In 2014, he played a young Harry Dunn in the film Dumb and Dumber To and starred in American Horror Story: Freak Show as Mike.

== Personal life ==
In 2015, Gray was seriously injured by an alleged drunk driver in Katy, Texas.

== Filmography ==
=== Film ===
Year	Title	Role	Notes
2010	Initiation	Older Brother/ Bully	Short film
2011	To Calm A Rage	Charlie	Short film
2011	A. B. Zone: An Anti-Bullying Film for Kids	Brett	
2012	No One Lives	Younger Son	
2012	Dr. Oscar Griffith: Hollywood Psychiatrist	The Actor /Daniel	
2014	The Rolling Road	Andy Botteril	
2014	My Time to Die	Frank	
2014	I Lack	Ryan	
2014	Dumb and Dumber To	Young Harry Dunne	
2015	The Alchemy of Thieves	Peter	Short film
2015	Lazer Team	Young Adam	
2015	Flay	River Cain	
2015	InvoluntAria	Jonathan	Pre-production
2015	1 Interrogation	Jack Jones	Post-production
2016	America, Land of the Free?	Jim Tabor	Pre-production

=== Television ===
Year	Title	Role	Notes
2010	My Generation	Jake	2 episodes
2012–2013	Treme	Jack Colson	Season 3 and 4
2013	Revolution	Andy	Episode: "Bone in the USA"
2014	American Horror Story: Freak Show	Mike	Episode: "Edward Mordrake"
2015	Stunted	Trent	Pilot for NBC Playground
2015	NCIS: New Orleans	Chas	Episode: "Foreign Affairs"
2015	Scream Queens	Red Devil	Episode: "The Final Girl(s)"
2018	Cloak & Dagger	Benny	2 episodes

== Awards and nominations ==
Year	Award	Category	Nominated work	Result
2015	36th Young Artist Awards	Best Performance in a TV Series – Guest Starring Young Actor 15-21	American Horror Story: Freak Show	Nominated
