= Dumb and Dumber =

1994 comedy film by Peter Farrelly

- Theatrical release poster
- Directed by: Peter Farrelly
- Written by: Peter Farrelly; Bobby Farrelly; Bennett Yellin
- Produced by: Charles B. Wessler; Brad Krevoy; Steve Stabler
- Starring: Jim Carrey; Jeff Daniels; Lauren Holly; Karen Duffy; Mike Starr; Charles Rocket; Teri Garr
- Cinematography: Mark Irwin
- Edited by: Christopher Greenbury
- Music by: Todd Rundgren
- Production companies: Katja Motion Picture Corporation; Krevoy/Stabler/Wessler Production
- Distributed by: New Line Cinema
- Release date: December 16, 1994
- Running time: 106 minutes
- Country: United States
- Language: English
- Budget: $17 million
- Box office: $247.3 million

Dumb and Dumber is a 1994 American road buddy comedy film directed by Peter Farrelly, who cowrote the screenplay with his brother Bobby and Bennett Yellin. It is the first installment in the Dumb and Dumber franchise. Starring Jim Carrey and Jeff Daniels, it tells the story of Lloyd Christmas (Carrey) and Harry Dunne (Daniels), two unintelligent but well-meaning friends from Providence, Rhode Island, who set out on a cross-country road trip to Aspen, Colorado, to return a briefcase full of money to its owner, unaware it was left as a ransom. Lauren Holly, Karen Duffy, Mike Starr, Charles Rocket, and Teri Garr play supporting roles.

The film was released by New Line Cinema on December 16, 1994. It received mixed reviews from critics, but was a commercial success, grossing $247.3 million against a $17 million budget. The success of Dumb and Dumber launched the career of the Farrelly brothers, established the range of the heretofore dramatically acclaimed Daniels as a gifted comedic actor and revitalized his Hollywood career, and solidified Carrey's reputation as one of the most prominent actors of the 1990s. It has since developed a cult following. The film also spawned an animated TV series, a 2003 prequel, and a 2014 sequel.

== Plot ==
Lloyd Christmas and Harry Dunne are two good-hearted but dimwitted best friends and roommates living in Providence, Rhode Island. Lloyd, a chip-toothed limousine driver, is instantly smitten with his passenger Mary Swanson, who is flying to Aspen, Colorado. She leaves a briefcase in the airport and Lloyd attempts to return it, unaware it contains ransom money she has left for criminals Joe "Mental" Mentalino and J. P. Shay. Mary's plane has already departed, and Lloyd falls out of the jetway.

Fired for leaving the scene of an accident, Lloyd returns home to learn that Harry, a dog groomer, has also been fired for showing up late to a dog show with the dogs covered in food. Mental and Shay follow Lloyd home, but he and Harry mistake the crooks for debt collectors and flee, returning later to find Harry's parakeet has been decapitated by Mental who intended it as a threat, but Harry mistakenly believes the bird's head fell off due to old age. Lloyd convinces Harry that they should return Mary's briefcase, and they set off for Aspen in Harry's dog-styled van.

Mental poses as a hitchhiker and is picked up by Harry and Lloyd, who annoy him with their childish antics. Stopping for lunch, Mental plans to slip the duo rat poison pills, but they prank him by putting chili peppers in his burger, aggravating his stomach ulcer. Mistaking the pills for his medication, they inadvertently kill him with the poison but continue their trip.

At a gas station, Harry flirts with fellow Aspen-bound driver Beth, and unwittingly saves Lloyd from being assaulted by Sea Bass, a trucker they tricked at a diner earlier. Police wait to intercept the duo on the road to Colorado, but Lloyd takes a wrong turn and drives all night through Nebraska. Harry gives up on the journey, but Lloyd persuades him to continue after trading their van for a minibike.

The duo arrives in Aspen but cannot find Mary, and a frustrated Harry attacks Lloyd, breaking open the briefcase and discovering the money, which they use on a hotel suite and lavish spending spree. They read in the newspaper that Mary and her family are hosting a charity gala, where a nervous Lloyd asks Harry to talk to her on his behalf. However, Harry agrees to go skiing with Mary instead, lying to Lloyd that he arranged a date for him.

While Harry and Mary have an enjoyable time together, Lloyd waits at the hotel bar and encounters Beth. Visiting Mary's home, he realizes that Harry lied to spend the day with her himself. In retaliation, Lloyd serves him coffee laced with laxatives, causing Harry to have diarrhea in Mary's broken toilet, while Lloyd reintroduces himself to Mary. Taking her to the hotel to return the briefcase, he confesses his love for her, but she rejects him.

Nicholas Andre, a friend of the Swanson family, arrives, from whom Lloyd learns that Mary has a husband named Bobby, and that the money was for him, revealing himself as the mastermind behind the kidnapping. Nicholas holds them at gunpoint and is furious to discover that Harry and Lloyd spent the ransom, replacing it with IOUs. Harry arrives and after a brief confrontation with Lloyd over Mary is shot by Nicholas, and plays dead before ineptly returning fire. An FBI team bursts in, led by Beth, revealing that she's an agent on the kidnappers' case and prepared Harry with a bulletproof vest and gun. Nicholas and Shay are arrested, and Mary and Bobby are reunited, much to Lloyd's dismay.

With their trip rendered pointless and their hopes for the trip crushed, Harry and Lloyd travel home on foot, after all their purchases were confiscated and their minibike broke down. They encounter a busload of bikini models on a national tour, but ignorantly reject an offer to be their "oil boys". Harry tells Lloyd that they will get their "break" one day, and they play a game of tag as they walk back to Rhode Island.

== Cast ==
- Jim Carrey as Lloyd Christmas: A goofy, chip-toothed slacker who has been fired from several jobs. He has a crush on Mary Swanson, unaware that she is already married
- Jeff Daniels as Harry Dunne: Lloyd's ditzy and air-headed best friend and roommate who has been fired from his current job. He has a crush on Mary too, but is also unaware that Mary has a husband
- Lauren Holly as Mary Swanson: A wealthy but troubled heiress whose husband Bobby has been kidnapped.
- Charles Rocket as Nicholas Andre: A greedy, wealthy resident of Aspen, Colorado and the mastermind behind Bobby's kidnapping
- Mike Starr as Joe Mentalino: A henchman for Nicholas Andre. He has a stomach ulcer and regularly takes medication for it
- Karen Duffy as J.P. Shay: A henchwoman of Nicholas Andre
- Teri Garr as Helen Swanson: Mary's stepmother
- Felton Perry as Detective Dale
- Harland Williams as the motorcycle police officer
- Victoria Rowell as Beth Jordan (credited as "Athletic Beauty"): An FBI agent masquerading as a talkative young woman moving to Aspen to get away from her boyfriend
- Cam Neely as Sea Bass: A hot-tempered trucker who gets into frequent confrontations with Lloyd and Harry on their way to Aspen. Their first encounter was at a diner in Pennsylvania
- Joe Baker as Barnard
- Brad Lockerman as Bobby Swanson: Mary's kidnapped husband
- Lin Shaye as Mrs. Margie Neugeboren (referred to by Harry as "Mrs. Noogieburger"), dog owner and client of Harry's.
- Hank Brandt as Karl Swanson, Mary's father
- Brady Bluhm as Billy in 4C, a blind and young boy who uses a wheelchair, to whom Lloyd sold some of his and Harry's belongings, including Harry's headless parakeet. He appears on A Current Affair when Harry and Lloyd arrive in Aspen
- Connie Sawyer as elderly lady
- Cos Kattou - Salt Catcher
- Peter Edward Dutton - Wheelchair Mechanic

== Production ==
John Hughes conceived the film before he sold it to the Farrelly brothers and asked for his name to be removed from the writing credits. His concept was named Ski Nuts and was about "two dumb guys in Aspen". The Farrelly brothers had been trying for years to get their first movie made. Director Peter's agent encouraged him to make a movie himself, alongside his brother Bobby.

=== Casting ===
The Farrelly brothers did not know who Jim Carrey was; they were only told that he was "the white guy" on In Living Color. Only after a screening of Carrey's first major acting role, Ace Ventura: Pet Detective, did they become interested in casting him. Based on the box office success of Ace Ventura, Carrey was able to negotiate a salary of $7 million for this film.

Nicolas Cage, who was proposed to be Carrey's co-star, tried to negotiate a $2 million increase in his fee but New Line Cinema decided against casting him and signed Jeff Daniels instead. Cage said he turned it down to do Leaving Las Vegas instead. Daniels was only paid around $50,000. New Line Cinema originally did not want Daniels in the film, as he was known only for his dramatic work at the time. However, the Farrellys and Carrey wanted Daniels for the part. Although New Line Cinema agreed to their demands, Daniels was offered the low salary in the hopes it would discourage him from signing on to the film. Daniels ultimately accepted the role, despite his agent reportedly dissuading him out of fears it would kill his career.

100 actors turned down the role of Lloyd, including Steve Martin and Martin Short. According to Splitsider, Gary Oldman and Cage were the original choices for Lloyd and Harry. Chris Elliott and Rob Lowe were both also considered for the role of Harry. Lauren Holly was cast as she heard Carrey and Daniels were going to be in the film. Carrey's chipped tooth was genuine, resulting from a fight with a classmate in his childhood, but he had since had it capped. He simply had the crown temporarily removed from that tooth to portray Lloyd.

=== Filming ===
Scenes taking place in Aspen were filmed in Breckenridge, Colorado and Park City, Utah. The Stanley Hotel in Estes Park, Colorado was transformed into the "Danbury Hotel" for the filming of the movie. The "Danbury Hotel" bar scene and staircase shot were the shots filmed there. The scenes filmed in the snow were shot at Copper Mountain Resort, Colorado. Some of the external street scenes were filmed in Salt Lake City, and the airport scene was filmed at Salt Lake City International Airport. Some scenes from the beginning of the film were shot on location in the Providence metropolitan area, including shots of the skyline and the Big Blue Bug; scenes from the beginning of their road trip were shot in locations in Cumberland, Rhode Island. Parts of the film were also shot in Ogden, Utah and American Fork Canyon.

== Music ==
The score for Dumb and Dumber was composed by Todd Rundgren, whose 1978 song "Can We Still Be Friends?" was used in the film. The original soundtrack to the film was released by RCA Records on November 22, 1994. The soundtrack album's first single, "New Age Girl" by Deadeye Dick, was a chart hit, reaching number 27 in the US, while the music video for the Crash Test Dummies' version of "The Ballad of Peter Pumpkinhead" featured Jeff Daniels reprising his role of Harry.

== Reception ==
=== Box office ===
Dumb and Dumber opened at No. 1 in its opening weekend, earning $16.4 million. It went on to gross $127,175,374 in the United States, and $247,275,374 worldwide, and topping the holiday season film gross.

=== Critical response ===
Rotten Tomatoes, a review aggregator, reports that 69% of 54 surveyed critics gave Dumb and Dumber a positive review. The site's consensus reads: "A relentlessly stupid comedy elevated by its main actors: Jim Carrey goes bonkers and Jeff Daniels carries himself admirably in an against-type performance". On Metacritic, which assigns a rating out of 100 to reviews from film critics, it has a score of 41 based on reviews from 14 critics, which indicates "mixed or average" reviews. Audiences polled by CinemaScore gave the film an average grade of "B" on an A+ to F scale.

Roger Ebert of The Chicago Sun-Times gave the film two of four stars, saying parts of the film were uneven. But he praised the performances of Carrey and Daniels, dubbing the former a "true original", and he also wrote how the dead parakeet joke "made me laugh so loudly I embarrassed myself. I just couldn't stop". Stephen Holden of The New York Times called Carrey "the new Jerry Lewis", and Peter Stack of the San Francisco Chronicle called it "riotous", "rib-splitting", and gave the film praise for being both a crude and slapstick comedy and a "smart comedy" at the same time.

=== Accolades ===
Although Dumb and Dumber did not secure any major American film awards, it was successful at the 1995 MTV Movie Awards. Carrey won for Best Comic Performance, Carrey and Holly (a couple who would later endure a short-lived marriage) won for Best Kiss, and Carrey and Daniels were nominated for Best On-Screen Duo. In 2000, readers of Total Film magazine voted Dumb and Dumber the fifth greatest comedy film of all time. The film ranks 445th on Empire's 2008 list of the 500 greatest movies of all time.

=== Year-end lists ===
- 7th – David Stupich, The Milwaukee Journal
- Worst films (not ranked) – Jeff Simon, The Buffalo News
- 2nd worst – Sean P. Means, The Salt Lake Tribune
- Top 10 worst (listed alphabetically, not ranked) – Mike Mayo, The Roanoke Times
- Dishonorable mention – Dan Craft, The Pantagraph

== Other media ==
=== Animated series ===
In 1995, a Hanna-Barbera-produced animated series aired on ABC, as part of its Saturday morning cartoon lineup; Matt Frewer provided the voice of Lloyd, while Bill Fagerbakke voiced Harry. In the cartoon, Harry and Lloyd have reacquired their van, now named "Otto". The cartoon also features a new character, Kitty, a female pet purple beaver who appears to be smarter than both men. The animated series was written by Bennett Yellin, co-writer of the film, and was cancelled after one season.

=== Prequel ===
In 2003, a prequel was theatrically released, entitled Dumb and Dumberer: When Harry Met Lloyd. The film featured a cast and crew different from the previous film, and the Farrelly brothers had no involvement in the film's production. It was panned by critics, receiving a 10% rating on Rotten Tomatoes. It grossed approximately $39.2 million worldwide against a $19 million budget, as opposed to the original film's far greater $247 million worldwide gross against a $17 million budget.

=== Sequel ===
The Farrelly brothers returned to make a sequel to Dumb and Dumber. The sequel, titled Dumb and Dumber To, was shot in the fall of 2013. Carrey and Daniels returned, with Bobby and Peter Farrelly directing, along with original screenwriter Bennett Yellin. Actors reprising their roles from the first film include Brady Bluhm, who played Billy in (Apartment) 4C, and Cam Neely, who played Sea Bass. Dumb and Dumber To was released on November 14, 2014. Compared to the original film, Dumb and Dumber To was met with mixed reviews from critics, although it did well commercially. Dumb and Dumber To was not released by Warner Bros. Pictures (who now owns New Line Cinema), but rather by Universal Pictures. New Line was given studio credit from Universal.
