= Ice on the Dune =

Studio album by Empire of the Sun
- Released: 14 June 2013
- Recorded: November 2011 – 2013
- Studios: Linear Recording (Sydney); Forgotten Valley (Lower Mangrove, Australia); The Dungeon (Perth); The Muse (London); The Chateau (Coromandel Peninsula, New Zealand); Downtown Music (New York City); Circle House (Miami); Sear Sound (New York City); Avatar (New York City); Sage and Sound (Los Angeles); Westlake (Los Angeles); Nick's 9th Street (New York City); Pulse (Los Angeles); John Hills (Los Angeles)
- Genres: Synth-pop; electropop; disco; Eurodance; glam rock
- Length: 42:52
- Label: Capitol
- Producers: Empire of the Sun; Peter Mayes; Donnie Sloan

Empire of the Sun chronology
Walking on a Dream (2008)	Ice on the Dune (2013)	Two Vines (2016)

Singles from Ice on the Dune
- 1. "Alive" Released: 15 April 2013; 2. "DNA" Released: 5 September 2013; 3. "Celebrate" Released: 14 February 2014

Ice on the Dune is the second studio album by Australian electronic music duo Empire of the Sun, released on 14 June 2013 by Capitol Records. The album was met with generally positive reviews from music critics, with many commenting on the progression of the group's sound from their debut album.

A trailer for the album debuted on 11 March 2013; it was produced by Kelvin Optical, a production division of Bad Robot, and was directed by J. D. Dillard. Along with this, the band released a fictional story related to the album which described a world looked over by an "Emperor" and a "Prophet".

The lead single "Alive" premiered on 15 April 2013, and the album became available to pre-order on iTunes the same day. The music video for the song, filmed in Bryce Canyon National Park in Utah, was directed by Charles Scott and Alex Theurer and also produced by Kelvin Optical. Both "DNA" and "Celebrate" appeared as follow-up singles.

To promote the album, the duo played a series of US festival dates, and returned to Australia on 30 May to perform at the Sydney Opera House for Vivid Sydney. The duo performed on Jimmy Kimmel Live! on 18 June, marking their first television appearance in the US. The duo also performed at the Australian Splendour in the Grass festival in late July.

The album's cover art, designed by Aaron Hayward and David Homer from Sydney studio Debaser, won an Artisan Award prior to the ARIA Music Awards of 2013, held on 1 December. In addition, the album was nominated for Best Pop Release, Engineer of the Year (Peter Mayes) and Producer of the Year (Steele, Littlemore, Mayes and Jonathan Sloan). Empire of the Sun were also nominated for Best Group for the album, but did not win.

== Music ==
=== Themes ===
"The centre and the small hours in between the highlight and the Bacchanalian party of 'Alive' and 'DNA' and all these very out-there, almost camp moments, then to that quiet moment within the centre, and then we kind of unroll out of there to the dawn of the new day, to 'Keep a Watch'. So I feel that the record, it does have an evening, or an arc journey to it."

— Littlemore, on the flow and concept of the album

In an interview with MetroLyrics, Nick Littlemore explained that the writing of the album was influenced by frequent touring and travel and the "tyranny of distance", primarily from family. He described the song "I'll Be Around" as "a nice message to each other—to Luke and I, and then to our loved ones and our families and to the audience, that 'we will be around'".

In the same interview, Littlemore again reinforced the impact of distance, stating, "When we came back together, initially it felt like a secret affair and it was great, but then as you run deeper into that relationship again, there were things that we communicated to each other." Elaborating, he said, "We [communicate through] the nature of song. [...] I think there was a large part of what we were writing about was distance and longing, and I guess some way of kind of sending out a message to the wider world, like that there is a force field that protects all of us and no matter where you are, if you feel for someone and they're in your heart, then you're always with them in some sense."

Expanding on the meaning behind the album's title to Pigeons and Planes, Luke Steele spoke of it as being "like an invisible hummingbird with that lyric and melody came in. Ice on the dune. And no one really knew what it meant. It was like ice on the dune and while we were shooting the first video in that canyon, there were these ginormous dunes with slithers of ice. It was serendipitous like ice on the dune." Despite being unable to answer what he wanted listeners to take away from the record, Steele did comment that "the beauty of it is what people get from it [...] People just need to have an open mind when they listen to music."

=== Songs ===
The album opens with the instrumental track "Lux", which several critics likened to a Danny Elfman composition with an orchestral and cinematic quality. The song was composed by Henry Hey, whom Littlemore met in New York City through producer Phil Ramone. The second track, "DNA", was released as a promotional single around the time of the album's release and contains disco hallmarks as well as "breezy acoustic strumming and throbbing synths". Its verses are driven by acoustic guitars and "melodic synth lines", before bass-heavy chords are introduced into its chorus, according to MTV News. Critics termed lead single and third track "Alive", a synth-pop-based song with elements of house, "catchy", with Neil Ashman of Drowned in Sound labelling it as "life-affirming electro-fuzz". It was also stated to have a "schoolyard" quality. The Observer called both it and following song "Concert Pitch" "deliriously upbeat confections". Sarah H. Grant of Consequence of Sound likened "Concert Pitch" to a "dance-floor tantrum inspired by the many Neil Tennant had himself", and the song was also said to contain a "punchy disco pulse and wistfully breathy chorus". In an interview with Moshcam, Steele said the song reminded him of Bruce Springsteen and Tom Petty; he composed the song in a Santa Monica hotel room after experiences while in New York: "I had a real [...] breakdown [...] I was just so confused about [my] whole position in [...] my entertainment/musical life", pointing out this as the reason for the opening lyric "I don't wanna be so complicated".

Title track "Ice on the Dune", a Eurodance-inspired song with "wistful choruses", was especially praised by Kevin Catchpole of PopMatters, who observed it as having "'80s" vocals and opined it was fitting as the title of the album. Tim Sendra of AllMusic felt it had soft rock influences. Following track "Awakening" was also said to contain a disco sound and a "Donna Summer thump", while "I'll Be Around", a midtempo ballad, was declared "ethereal" and "reverb-swamped". Steele was praised for his "delicate vocal approach" to the song, which Ashman judged was "oddly redolent of Mew". The primarily instrumental "Old Flavours" was pointed out for its tropical infusions and disco influences. "Celebrate" is an electronic rock song set to a dance beat with robotic Auto-Tuned vocals, which was described as a "throbbing Madonna-inspired club jam". Subsequent cut "Surround Sound" was called "incredibly bouncy and fun", and was especially marked for its lyrical content, containing such lines as "Let's push through four dimensions/'Til our brains turn to jelly" and "Meditate with no thinking/Eternally". Both "Celebrate" and "Disarm" were singled out as being "EDM at its warmest-sounding". Multiple album reviews noted several songs' similarity to Daft Punk tracks, especially "Awakening" and "Celebrate". Several were noted to have sounds reminiscent of dubstep according to NME, notably "Concert Pitch", "Awakening" and "Old Flavours"; Grant of Consequence of Sound felt much of the album is stylistically rooted in new wave. Another comparison made was album closer "Keep a Watch", which features a gospel choir, to David Bowie, often in a negative context. AllMusic's Tim Sendra proclaimed it an "OTT ballad that ends the album in an overwrought splash of powdery tears", and Ashman also noted it to be a "poised piano ballad" which lapsed into "overblown histrionics".

== Critical reception ==
Professional ratings
Aggregate scores
Source	Rating
Metacritic	68/100
Review scores
Source	Rating
AllMusic	4.5/5 stars
Drowned in Sound	6/10
The Guardian	3/5 stars
The Independent	4/5 stars
NME	4/10
The Observer	4/5 stars
Pitchfork	5.6/10
PopMatters	8/10
Rolling Stone	2.5/5 stars
Slant Magazine	3.5/5 stars

Ice on the Dune received generally positive reviews from music critics. At Metacritic, which assigns a normalised rating out of 100 to reviews from mainstream publications, the album received an average score of 68, based on 20 reviews. Tim Sendra of AllMusic wrote that the album "ends up being everything a good modern pop record should be, and then some. The songs have super-sharp choruses, incessantly listenable arrangements built on acoustic, electric, and programmed instruments, and icy-cold but immediate beats", commending the duo for their "skill at crafting perfect pop" and concluding, "Modern pop doesn't get any better than this." Kevin Catchpole of PopMatters commented that "Empire of the Sun has delivered a well-blended mix of disco, electropop and just plain fun that evokes the greats without copying them outright. That's not an easy trick to pull off, but they do it well and continue towards a bright future with this release." The Independent called the album "[g]orgeous" and described it as a "seamless suite of elegiac synth-pop, with fairydust-flecked melodies, a perpetually peaking bass end, chord changes that reach into your heart, and fantasising falsetto vocals." Phil Mongredien of The Observer remarked that the album "takes [Walking on a Dream's] template—naggingly catchy pop given a euphoric dance twist—and marries it to an even stronger set of songs", adding that "the second half finds them in more restrained—but no less winning—mood".

Slant Magazine's Kevin Liedel characterised the album as "both maddeningly bizarre and bewitching, often at the same time" and wrote, "Eschewing any signs of trendy alienation, Empire of the Sun would rather just go alien." The Guardian's Alexis Petridis praised the duo as being "extremely good at writing euphoric pop melodies" and dubbed Ice on the Dune "a pretty impressive pop album", but stated that "it's hard not to wonder what might have been had just a bit of the fanciful imagination that goes into the visual side of Empire of the Sun been allowed to seep in." Drowned in Sound's Neil Ashman felt that the duo are "seemingly too content to stick to their template" and faulted the album for "the lack of any standout tracks like [...] 'Walking on a Dream' and 'We Are the People'", concluding, "Perhaps with a little more nuance they can exploit the potential of their partnership to be one of the most intriguing electro-pop duos around—but on Ice on the Dune that potential remains unrealised." Jayson Greene of Pitchfork noted that the album is "certainly bigger, and more purposefully stadium-scaled, than its predecessor", while commenting that the duo's "stuff floats off, and the synths carry the whiff not of a beach breeze but of a department-store escalator." Jon Dolan of Rolling Stone expressed, "The vintage-Daft Punk cheese platter 'Celebrate' and album-ending Bowie joke 'Keep a Watch' are foamy fun, but too often Ice on the Dune just feels like a lobotomy on the dance floor." Mark Beaumont of NME opined that the album's "saving grace is Steele's airy falsetto", but dismissed his contributions, writing, "In trying to reinvent himself as a Bowie-esque future-glam Pop Star, he's been sucked into the sub-Gaga blandness of mainstream music, his aesthetic so costume-party comical it's an unknowing pastiche that takes itself far more seriously than even he seems to realise."

The album was named the best pop album of 2013 by iTunes Australia. In addition, Dave DiMartino and Lyndsey Parker of Yahoo! Music both named Ice on the Dune the best album of 2013.

== Commercial performance ==
Ice on the Dune debuted at number 20 on the Billboard 200, number five on the Top Rock Albums chart, and number two on the Top Dance/Electronic Albums chart, selling 16,000 copies in its first week. As of September 2016, the album had sold 73,000 copies in the United States.

== Track listing ==
No.	Title	Writer(s)	Length
1.	"Lux"	Luke Steele; Nicholas Littlemore; Henry Hey	1:25
2.	"DNA"	Steele; Littlemore; John Hill; Peter Mayes; Jonathan Sloan	3:54
3.	"Alive"	Steele; Littlemore; Mayes; Sloan; Steven V. Bach	3:24
4.	"Concert Pitch"	Steele; Littlemore; Mayes; Sloan	3:40
5.	"Ice on the Dune"	Steele; Littlemore; Mayes; Sloan	3:25
6.	"Awakening"	Steele; Littlemore; Mayes; Sloan	3:45
7.	"I'll Be Around"	Steele; Littlemore; Mayes; Sloan	4:30
8.	"Old Flavours"	Steele; Littlemore; Mayes; Sloan	3:54
9.	"Celebrate"	Steele; Littlemore; Mayes; Sloan; Daniel Johns; Scott Horscroft	3:19
10.	"Surround Sound"	Steele; Littlemore; Mayes; Sloan	3:17
11.	"Disarm"	Steele; Littlemore; Sloan	3:51
12.	"Keep a Watch"	Steele; Littlemore; Mayes; Bach	4:28
Total length:			42:52

Amazon MP3 Germany exclusive bonus track
No.	Title	Length
13.	"Alive" (Gold Fields Remix)	5:14

== Personnel ==
Credits adapted from the liner notes of Ice on the Dune.

=== Musicians ===
- Henry Hey – orchestral arrangements (track 1)
- Brian Kilgore – percussion (tracks 1, 7, 12); magic (tracks 1, 12)
- Constance Hauman – vocals (track 1)
- Ben Witt – guitar (tracks 2, 4, 5)
- Steven V. Bach – keyboards (track 3); piano (track 12)
- Liam Gerner – guitar (tracks 3, 5, 6)
- Daniel Johns – vocals (track 9)
- Felix Bloxsom – drums (track 10)
- Jerry Barnes – bass (tracks 10, 12)
- Tawatha Agee – choir (track 12)
- Everett Bradley – choir (track 12)
- Sharon Bryant – choir (track 12)
- Dennis Collins – choir (track 12)
- Catherine Russell – choir (track 12)

=== Technical ===
- Empire of the Sun – production (all tracks)
- Peter Mayes – production, engineering (all tracks); mixing (tracks 1, 4, 6–8, 10–12)
- Roy Hendrickson – engineering (all tracks)
- Donnie Sloan – production (all tracks)
- Serban Ghenea – mixing (tracks 2, 3)
- Mark "Spike" Stent – mixing (track 5)
- Jason Cox – mixing (track 9)
- Steve Smart – mastering (tracks 5, 7)
- Karen Thompson – mastering (tracks 1–4, 6, 8–12)

=== Artwork ===
- Dave Homer – cover artwork
- Mathematics – additional artwork

== Charts ==
=== Weekly charts ===
Chart (2013)	Peak position
Australian Albums (ARIA)	3
Australian Dance Albums (ARIA)	1
Austrian Albums (Ö3 Austria)	37
Belgian Albums (Ultratop Flanders)	40
Belgian Albums (Ultratop Wallonia)	35
Croatian Albums (HDU)	39
Dutch Albums (Album Top 100)	53
French Albums (SNEP)	26
German Albums (Offizielle Top 100)	34
Greek Albums (IFPI)	32
Irish Albums (IRMA)	26
Italian Albums (FIMI)	41
New Zealand Albums (RMNZ)	16
Norwegian Albums (VG-lista)	25
Scottish Albums (Official Charts)	31
Swiss Albums (Schweizer Hitparade)	7
UK Albums (Official Charts)	24
US Billboard 200	20
US Top Alternative Albums (Billboard)	4
US Top Dance Albums (Billboard)	2
US Top Rock Albums (Billboard)	5

=== Year-end charts ===
Chart (2013)	Position
Australian Dance Albums (ARIA)	14
US Top Dance/Electronic Albums (Billboard)	21

== Certifications ==
Region	Certification	Certified units/sales
Australia (ARIA)	Gold	35,000^{‡}
^{‡} Sales+streaming figures based on certification alone.

== Release history ==
Region	Date	Label	Ref.
Australia	14 June 2013	Capitol	
United States	18 June 2013	Astralwerks	
Germany	21 June 2013	Universal	
Netherlands	21 June 2013	EMI	
Ireland	21 June 2013	Virgin EMI	
United Kingdom	24 June 2013	Virgin EMI	
France	24 June 2013	EMI	
Italy	25 June 2013	EMI	
Poland	25 June 2013	Universal	
Sweden	26 June 2013	Universal	
