= Live at the Royal Albert Hall (The Cinematic Orchestra album) =

Live album by the Cinematic Orchestra
- Released: 14 April 2008
- Venue: Royal Albert Hall
- Genres: Nu jazz, electronica, downtempo
- Label: Ninja Tune (UK)
- Producer: The Cinematic Orchestra

The Cinematic Orchestra chronology
Ma Fleur (2007)	Live at the Royal Albert Hall (2008)	To Believe (2019)

Alternative cover
- Cover of U.S. edition

Professional ratings
Review scores
Source	Rating
Tiny Mix Tapes	link

Live at the Royal Albert Hall is a live album by the Cinematic Orchestra, released in the UK on 14 April 2008 on Ninja Tune Records. The original concert was performed on 2 November 2007 at The Royal Albert Hall in London.

== Track listing ==
1. "All That You Give" (originally on Every Day)
2. "Child Song" (originally on Ma Fleur)
3. "Flite" (originally on Every Day)
4. "Familiar Ground" (featuring Heidi Vogel) (originally on Ma Fleur)
5. "To Build a Home" (featuring Grey Reverend) (originally on Ma Fleur)
6. "Prelude" (originally on Ma Fleur)
7. "Breathe" (featuring Heidi Vogel) (originally on Ma Fleur)
8. "Man With The Movie Camera" (originally on Man with a Movie Camera)
9. "Time & Space" (featuring Lou Rhodes) (originally on Ma Fleur)
