= Alternately Deep =

Compilation album by Roots Manuva
- Released: March 13, 2006
- Studios: Dada Studios; Waterloo Bridge Studios; Unit L Studios; The Garden; Ceasefire Studios; Rhythm Station (Brixton); Plan B Studios
- Genre: UK rap
- Length: 45:50
- Label: Big Dada
- Producers: Colossus; Lotek; Roots Manuva; Steve Dub (add.); The Easy Access Orchestra

Roots Manuva chronology
Back to Mine: Roots Manuva (2005)	Alternately Deep (2006)	Slime & Reason (2008)

Professional ratings
Review scores
Source	Rating
AllMusic	3.5/5 stars
Gigwise	3.5/5 stars
MusicOMH	3/5 stars
Now	3/5 Ns
Prefix	6/10

Alternately Deep is a compilation album of remixes, b-sides and unreleased songs from the Awfully Deep sessions by British rapper and record producer Roots Manuva. It was released on 13 March 2006 via Big Dada Recordings. Beside Manuva himself, it was also produced by The Easy Access Orchestra, Colossus and Wayne "Lotek" Bennett, with additional production by Steve Dub. It features contributions from Ricky Ranking and Hazel Sim.

Composed of twelve tracks, the album includes previously released song "Double Drat", which was available only via Roots Manuva's website since 2004, and an alternate version of Colossus' own track "You a Grown Man Now" (retitled as "Grown Man"). The song "No Love" appeared in video games Need for Speed: Carbon and Test Drive Unlimited.

The album peaked at number 8 on the Official Hip Hop and R&B Albums Chart and number 13 on the Official Independent Albums Chart in the United Kingdom.

== Track listing ==
No.	Title	Writer(s)	Producer(s)	Length
1.	"No Love"	Rodney Hylton Smith	Roots Manuva; Steve Dub (add.)	3:53
2.	"Seat Yourself (Miami Mix)" (featuring Ricky Ranking)	Smith; Ricardo McKenzie	Roots Manuva	4:00
3.	"Double Drat"	Smith	Roots Manuva; Steve Dub (add.)	3:40
4.	"Nobody's Dancing"	Smith; Ralph Lamb; Andrew Michael Ross	Roots Manuva; The Easy Access Orchestra	3:58
5.	"Things We Do"	Smith; Lamb; Ross	The Easy Access Orchestra; Roots Manuva (add.); Steve Dub (add.)	3:17
6.	"Check It (Remix)"	Smith	Roots Manuva; Steve Dub (add.)	4:15
7.	"Get U High"	Smith	Roots Manuva; Steve Dub (add.)	3:24
8.	"Colossal Insight (Jammer Remix & Revox)"	Smith		3:08
9.	"Mean Street"	Smith	Roots Manuva; Steve Dub (add.)	5:07
10.	"Pep My Game"	Smith	Roots Manuva	2:52
11.	"This World Is Mine (Plan B Studio Version)"	Smith; Wayne Bennett	Roots Manuva; Lotek	4:15
12.	"Grown Man"	Smith; Charlie Tate	Colossus	4:01
Total length:				45:50

== Charts ==
Chart (2006)	Peak position
UK R&B Albums (Official Charts)	8
UK Independent Albums (Official Charts)	13
