= To Believe =

2019 studio album by the Cinematic Orchestra

Studio album by the Cinematic Orchestra
- Released: 15 March 2019
- Recorded: 2016–2018
- Genres: Electronic; downtempo; nu jazz; modern classical
- Length: 53:32
- Labels: Ninja Tune; Domino
- Producers: Dominic Smith; Jason Swinscoe

The Cinematic Orchestra chronology
Ma Fleur (2007)	To Believe (2019)

Singles from To Believe
- 1. "To Believe" Released: 20 October 2016; 2. "A Caged Bird / Imitations of Life" Released: 15 January 2019; 3. "A Promise" Released: 13 February 2019

Professional ratings
Aggregate scores
Source	Rating
Metacritic	82/100
Review scores
Source	Rating
AllMusic	3.5/5 stars
Clash	9/10
Exclaim!	9/10
The Guardian	3/5 stars
The Independent	4/5 stars
MusicOMH	3.5/5 stars
The Observer	5/5 stars
Q	8/10

To Believe is the fifth studio album by the British group the Cinematic Orchestra. It was released on 15 March 2019 through Ninja Tune and Domino. It is the group's first album in 12 years following Ma Fleur (2007), and was supported by a tour in the second quarter of 2019.

As with the group's previous work, it is jazz-inspired and features guests from the "global soul and jazz scene". The lead single, "A Caged Bird/Imitations of Life" featuring Roots Manuva, was released as a limited 12-inch single in independent record stores in January 2019.

== Background ==
Along with collaborations with Moses Sumney, Roots Manuva, Tawiah, Grey Reverend, Heidi Vogel and Dorian Concept, To Believe featured string arrangements by Miguel Atwood-Ferguson. The album was said to feature a "widescreen touch" that "draws on the power" of the band's catalogue by Clash. It was mixed by Tom Elmhirst at Electric Lady Studios in New York.

== Track listing ==
No.	Title	Length
1.	"To Believe" (featuring Moses Sumney)	5:27
2.	"A Caged Bird / Imitations of Life" (featuring Roots Manuva)	6:54
3.	"Lessons"	9:06
4.	"Wait for Now / Leave the World" (featuring Tawiah)	7:11
5.	"The Workers of Art"	6:16
6.	"Zero One / This Fantasy" (featuring Grey Reverend)	7:03
7.	"A Promise" (featuring Heidi Vogel)	11:35
Total length:		53:32

== Charts ==
Chart (2019)	Peak position
Australian Digital Albums (ARIA)	20
Belgian Albums (Ultratop Flanders)	24
Belgian Albums (Ultratop Wallonia)	47
Dutch Albums (Album Top 100)	32
French Albums (SNEP)	87
German Albums (Offizielle Top 100)	42
Lithuanian Albums (AGATA)	53
Scottish Albums (Official Charts)	12
Swiss Albums (Schweizer Hitparade)	37
UK Albums (Official Charts)	19
UK Dance Albums (Official Charts)	1
