= Late Night Tales: The Cinematic Orchestra =

2010 compilation album by the Cinematic Orchestra

Compilation album by The Cinematic Orchestra
- Released: 14 June 2010
- Genre: Electronic
- Label: Night Time Stories
- Producer: Jason Swinscoe
- Compiler: Jason Swinscoe

The Cinematic Orchestra chronology
The Crimson Wing: Mystery of the Flamingos OST (2009)	Late Night Tales: The Cinematic Orchestra (2010)	The Cinematic Orchestra presents In Motion #1 (2012)

Late Night Tales chronology
Late Night Tales: Snow Patrol (2009)	Late Night Tales: The Cinematic Orchestra (2010)	Late Night Tales: Midlake (2011)

Late Night Tales: The Cinematic Orchestra is a mix album compiled by British nu-jazz and electronic outfit the Cinematic Orchestra. It was released on 14 April 2010 as part of the Late Night Tales series. The mix includes tracks from artists such as Flying Lotus, Thom Yorke, Steve Reich, St Germain and Burial. It also features an exclusive studio version of their cover of Fontella Bass' song "Talking about Freedom".

== Track listing ==
No.	Title	Artist(s)	Length
1.	"Auntie's Harp (Rebekah Raff Remix)"	Flying Lotus	2:27
2.	"Three Hours"	Nick Drake	2:52
3.	"The Rain"	Eddie Gale	1:55
4.	"You're Goin' Miss Your Candyman"	Terry Callier	4:20
5.	"Behold the Day"	The Freedom Sounds featuring Wayne Henderson	2:59
6.	"Living Beats"	DJ Food	0:19
7.	"Aht Uh Mi Hed"	Shuggie Otis	4:27
8.	"Black Swan"	Thom Yorke	3:58
9.	"Restaurant"	The Cinematic Orchestra	0:19
10.	"Electric Counterpoint"	Steve Reich	1:21
11.	"Jóga"	Björk	3:02
12.	"Cumulus"	Imogen Heap	2:59
13.	"Rose Rouge"	St. Germain	5:22
14.	"See Line Woman (See Line Woman Vocal)"	Songstress	5:41
15.	"La Ritournelle"	Sebastien Tellier	8:10
16.	"Dog Shelter"	Burial	2:13
17.	"South American Getaway"	Burt Bacharach	3:10
18.	"Talking About Freedom (Exclusive Cover Version)"	The Cinematic Orchestra	5:22
19.	""The Happy Detective" (Part 3) (Exclusive Spoken Word Piece)"	Will Self	1:44

== Personnel ==
Mastering Engineer: Allen Farmelo
