= Bleeds (Roots Manuva album) =

Studio album by Roots Manuva
- Released: 30 October 2015
- Genre: Hip-hop
- Length: 40:40
- Label: Big Dada

Roots Manuva chronology
4everevolution (2011)	Bleeds (2015)

Professional ratings
Aggregate scores
Source	Rating
Metacritic	80/100
Review scores
Source	Rating
Clash	8/10 stars
Exclaim!	8/10
The Guardian	3/5 stars
NME	4/5 stars
The Observer	3/5 stars

Bleeds is the ninth studio album by English rapper Roots Manuva. It was released on 30 October 2015 on the Big Dada label.

== Critical reception ==
At Metacritic, which assigns a weighted average score out of 100 to reviews from mainstream critics, the album received an average score of 80% based on 17 reviews, indicating "generally favorable reviews".

In a positive review for Exclaim!, Kyle Mullin wrote that "His rhymes are so layered and rapid that they are all but indecipherable, giving them endless rewind value," further stating that "these features make Bleeds a dense, dark, demanding listen. But patient, socially conscious audiences will not only find it compelling, but galvanizing too." Noel Gardner of NME gave the album 4 stars out of 5, writing, "To borrow one of his old album titles, this is awfully deep."

== Track listing ==
No.	Title	Length
1.	"Hard Bastards"	5:18
2.	"Crying"	3:03
3.	"Facety 2:11"	2:43
4.	"Don't Breathe Out"	3:20
5.	"Cargo"	4:15
6.	"Stepping Hard"	5:19
7.	"Me Up!"	3:46
8.	"One Thing"	3:48
9.	"I Know Your Face"	5:22
10.	"Fighting For?"	3:46

== Charts ==
Chart (2015)	Peak position
UK Albums (Official Charts)	51
