= Man with a Movie Camera (The Cinematic Orchestra album) =

2003 studio album by the Cinematic Orchestra

Studio album by the Cinematic Orchestra
- Released: 26 May 2003
- Recorded: November 2002
- Genres: Nu jazz, electronica, downtempo
- Length: 60:55
- Labels: Ninja Tune, ZEN78 (LP), ZENCD078 (CD), ZENDV078 (DVD)
- Producer: The Cinematic Orchestra

The Cinematic Orchestra chronology
Every Day (2002)	Man with a Movie Camera (2003)	Ma Fleur (2007)

Professional ratings
Review scores
Source	Rating
AllMusic	3/5 stars
Billboard	(favourable)
The Guardian	4/5 stars
Pitchfork	(6.0/10)
PopMatters	(?)

Man with a Movie Camera is a 2003 soundtrack album by the Cinematic Orchestra, released on 26 May 2003 on Ninja Tune. The album contains re-workings and thematic reprises of some of the music from the band's previous album, 2002's Every Day, including the track "Man with a Movie Camera" and an instrumental version of "All Things to All Men" entitled "All Things".

Man with a Movie Camera comprises the soundtrack to a re-released version of the then ground-breaking 1929 silent documentary film of the same name from Soviet director Dziga Vertov.

== Overview ==
The Cinematic Orchestra were commissioned to record the score to play as the opening event in Porto, Portugal's year as European Capital of Culture in 2001.

The first live performance took place in the Coliseu do Porto theatre in May 2000 as part of that year's Porto Film Festival, and was met with a standing ovation from the audience of more than 3,500 people. The songs have since been performed at film festivals all over the world.

In November 2002, the band, along with a string section and percussionist Milo Fell, recorded the album over a two-day period at Whitfield Street Recording Studio in London.

A DVD of the same name was given a limited release in 2003. It included Vertov's original film allied to The Cinematic Orchestra's soundtrack, and a "making of" documentary as well as some live performances and music videos from the band.

== Track listing ==
1. "The Projectionist" – 0:06
2. "Melody" – 0:20
3. "Dawn" – 4:00
4. "The Awakening of a Woman (Burnout)" – 10:20
5. "Reel Life (Evolution II)" – 6:57
6. "Postlude" – 1:45
7. "Evolution (Versao Portuense)" – 5:47
8. "Work It! (Man with the Movie Camera)" – 8:05
9. "Voyage" – 0:22
10. "Odessa" – 2:05
11. "Theme de Yoyo" – 2:20
12. "The Magician" – 2:26
13. "Theme Reprise" – 2:53
14. "Yoyo Waltz" – 1:17
15. "Drunken Tune" – 4:50
16. "The Animated Tripod" – 1:12
17. "All Things" – 6:06

== Samples and inspiration ==
- The track "Work It! (Man with a Movie Camera)" bears strong thematic similarities to music composed by Bernard Herrmann for the film The 7th Voyage of Sinbad (1958), in particular, a scene in which Sinbad arrives in Baghdad.
- "Theme de Yoyo" is a cover version of the Art Ensemble of Chicago track from the film and album Les Stances a Sophie.

== Influence on popular culture ==
- The song "Awakening of a Woman (Burnout)" appeared on an episode of the first season of the anime series Immortal Grand Prix.

== See also ==
- Substrata (album)
