= The Key (Speech Debelle song) =

Single by Speech Debelle

from the album Speech Therapy
- Released: 2009
- Genre: Hip hop
- Length: 3:00 (Album Version); 2:58 (Radio Edit)
- Label: Big Dada
- Songwriters: Corynne Elliot; Leigh Ryan

Speech Debelle singles chronology
"Searching" (2009)	"The Key" (2009)	"Go Then, Bye" (2009)

Music video
- "The Key" on YouTube

"The Key" is a song by Speech Debelle, released as the second single from the album Speech Therapy. The album won the 2009 Mercury Prize.

== Critical reception ==
Tareck Ghoneim of Contactmusic.com commented that the song highlights "her unique voice and MC flow as well as her insightful and reflective lyrics" while using a clarinet to create "a truly refreshing and sophisticated sound that is street to the high street."

== Track listings ==
- UK CD single
1. "The Key" (Radio Edit) - 2:58
- iTunes single
1. "The Key" - 3:01
2. "The Key" (Instrumental) - 2:59

== Nominations ==
Year	Category	Genre	Recording	Result
UK Music Video Awards
2009	Best Budget – Pop, Dance, Urban	Music Video	The Key	Won
