= Slime & Reason =

Studio album by Roots Manuva
- Released: 1 September 2008
- Genre: Hip-hop
- Length: 54:29
- Label: Big Dada
- Producer: Toddla T

Roots Manuva chronology
Alternately Deep (2006)	Slime & Reason (2008)	4everevolution (2011)

Singles from Slime & Reason
- 1. "Buff Nuff" Released: 7 July 2008; 2. "Again & Again" Released: 25 August 2008; 3. "Let the Spirit" Released: 27 October 2008; 4. "Do Nah Bodda Mi" Released: 29 June 2009

Professional ratings
Aggregate scores
Source	Rating
Metacritic	76/100
Review scores
Source	Rating
AllMusic	3.5/5 stars
BBC	favorable
Billboard	favorable
The Independent	4/5 stars
MusicOMH	4/5 stars
NME	7/10 stars
The Observer	5/5 stars
Pitchfork	7.1/10
PopMatters	6/10 stars
The Times	4/5 stars

Slime & Reason is the sixth studio album of original material by Roots Manuva. It was released on 1 September 2008 on the Big Dada label. Hip Hop Connection magazine named it Album Of The Year 2008.

A limited-edition version of the album included a bonus CD, entitled Slime & Version, consisting of dub mixes by Wrongtom.

In 2009 it was awarded a silver certification from the Independent Music Companies Association which indicated sales of at least 30,000 copies throughout Europe.

== Critical reception ==
At Metacritic, which assigns a weighted average score out of 100 to reviews from mainstream critics, the album received an average score of 76% based on 16 reviews, indicating "generally favorable reviews".

== Track listing ==
No.	Title	Length
1.	"Again & Again"	4:06
2.	"C.R.U.F.F."	3:53
3.	"Do Nah Bodda Mi"	3:14
4.	"Let the Spirit"	4:37
5.	"Kick Up Ya Feet"	3:43
6.	"A Man's Talk"	3:46
7.	"Buff Nuff"	2:15
8.	"It's Me Oh Lord"	3:32
9.	"2 Much 2 Soon"	5:23
10.	"Do 4 Self"	3:10
11.	"The Show Must Go On"	6:07
12.	"I'm a New Man"	3:04
13.	"Well Alright"	3:57
14.	"The Struggle"	3:48

Limited edition bonus disc
No.	Title	Length
1.	"Again & Again & Again"	3:35
2.	"I'm a New Man (A New Version)"	2:51
3.	"A New Dub"	3:02
4.	"9 Dubs a Year"	3:15
5.	"Do Bodda Mi (in Digital)"	3:18
6.	"Dub for the Worms"	3:18
7.	"…And Again"	2:33

== Charts ==
Chart	Peak position
UK Albums (OCC)	22
