= All Things to All Men (song) =

"All Things To All Men"

Song by The Cinematic Orchestra featuring Roots Manuva

from the album Every Day
- Released: 27 April 2002
- Genre: Nu jazz; jazz rap; downtempo
- Length: 11:04
- Label: Ninja Tune
- Songwriters: John Barry; Phil France; Carolyn Leigh; Rodney Smith; Jason Swinscoe
- Producers: Phil France; Jason Swinscoe

All Things To All Men is a song by the Cinematic Orchestra, featuring vocals from English rapper Roots Manuva and an instrumental composition from Welsh musician Rhodri Davies. It is the sixth and longest track on the Cinematic Orchestra's second studio album, Every Day (2002).

== Composition ==
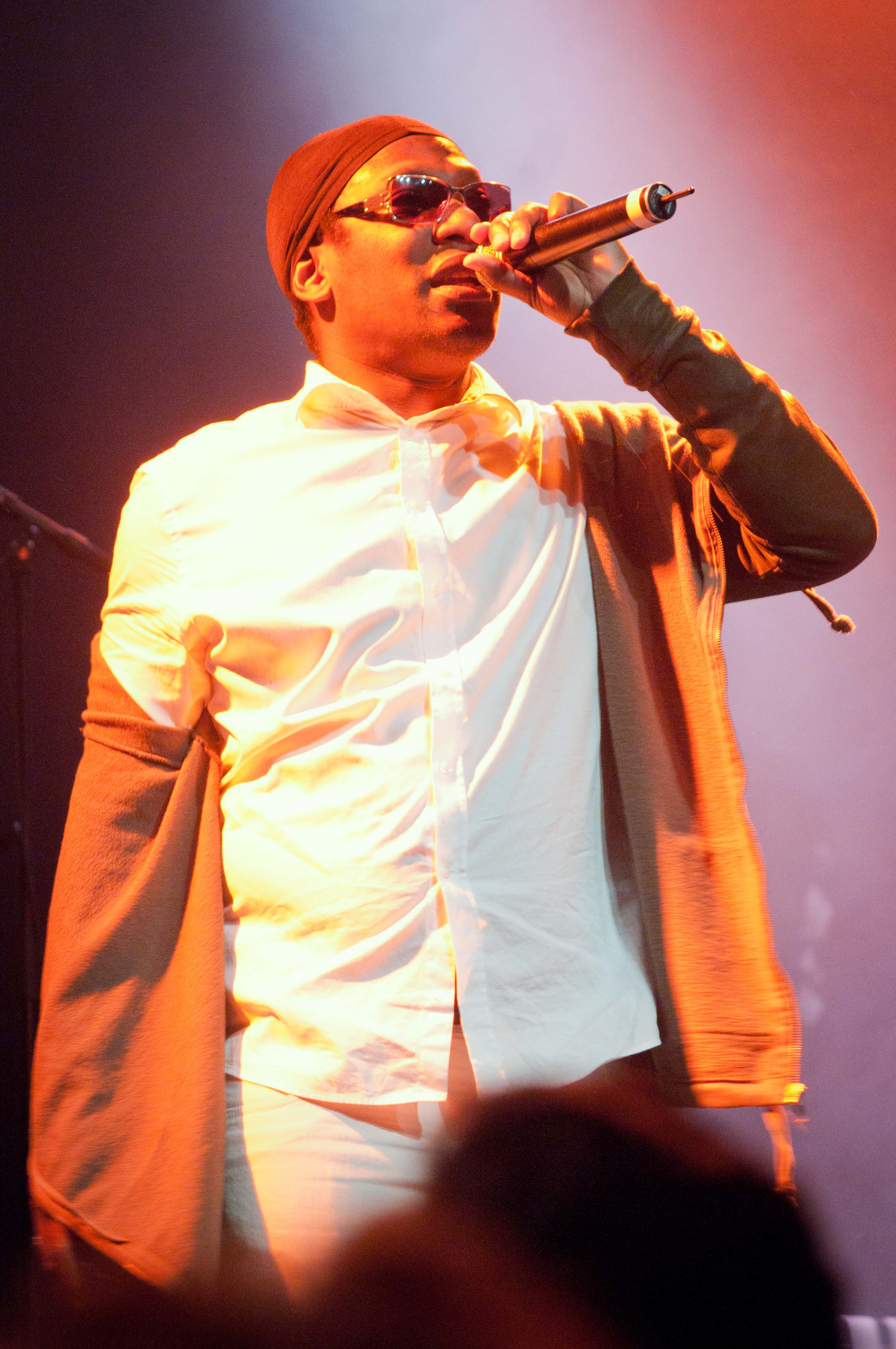
British rapper Roots Manuva provides vocals for the track.

The track begins with a sampling from composer John Barry's soundtrack from the 1968 motion picture Petulia. After different instrumental variations and the addition of a bass rhythm, the track introduces rapper Roots Manuva with a 4 minute long segment over the original sampling. In his lyrics, he references the TARDIS, a fictional spacecraft used in the popular science fiction television series Doctor Who, as well as American singer-songwriter Michael Jackson. The track then tones down in intensity to a piano riff, and eventually finishing with a Harp solo by Welsh musician Rhodri Davies. At just over 11 minutes long at extended length, it is the longest track on the album Every Day.

== Reception ==
John Bush of the online music guide service AllMusic describes the track as a "magisterial, spoken-word quasi-autobiography." Paul Cooper of Pitchfork said the song is "contemplative, doubting, restless. For the performance of his career, Roots Manuva drops his Stockwell rudie schtick for a philosophical self-examination that never descends into navel-gazing or therapy-babble." In a review for Every Day for BBC Music, Peter Marsh describes the track as "a cooly [sic] minimalist atmospheric funk workout complete with typically off beat rhymes from Roots Manuva and a lovely, kora-like Rhodri Davies harp solo."

The song has been used in various different programmes and films, including the closing soundtrack to the 2006 drama film Kidulthood, the television series Hustle, soap opera Hollyoaks and the documentary series Wonders of the Solar System. The song was used as an outro in the third part of When They See Us.

== Personnel ==
- Electric bass – Phil France
- Harp – Rhodri Davies
- Piano (acoustic) – John Ellis
- Produced by – Phil France and Jason Swinscoe
- Recorded by – Jamie Finch
- Soprano Saxophone – Tom Chant
- Vocals – Rodney Smith (Roots Manuva)
- Written by – Phil France, Jason Swinscoe, Carolyn Leigh, John Barry, Roots Manuva
