= Dub Come Save Me =

Remix album by Roots Manuva
- Released: 8 July 2002
- Genres: Hip-hop; dub
- Length: 41:04
- Label: Big Dada
- Producers: Hylton Smythe; Lord Gosh; Skillamanjaro

Roots Manuva chronology
Run Come Save Me (2001)	Dub Come Save Me (2002)	Awfully Deep (2005)

Professional ratings
Review scores
Source	Rating
AllMusic	4.5/5 stars
Exclaim!	mixed
NME	4/5 stars

Dub Come Save Me is a remix album by English hip-hop musician Roots Manuva. It is a re-working of his second studio album, Run Come Save Me. It was released on Big Dada in 2002.

== Track listing ==
No.	Title	Producer(s)	Length
1.	"Man Fi Cool"	Hylton Smythe	3:59
2.	"Highest Grade Dub"	Lord Gosh	3:46
3.	"Revolution 5" (featuring Chali 2na and Wayne Paul)	Lord Gosh	4:12
4.	"Styles Dub"	Lord Gosh	4:25
5.	"Tears"	Hylton Smythe	4:03
6.	"Dreamy Days SFA Dub" (remixed by Super Furry Animals)	Skillamanjaro	4:22
7.	"The Lynch"	Lord Gosh	3:54
8.	"Brand New Dub"	Lord Gosh	5:33
9.	"UK Warriors" (featuring Riddla)	Lord Gosh	2:54
10.	"Witness Dub"	Lord Gosh	3:56

== Charts ==
Chart	Peak position
US Reggae Albums (Billboard)	12
UK Albums (OCC)	75
