= Juice Aleem =

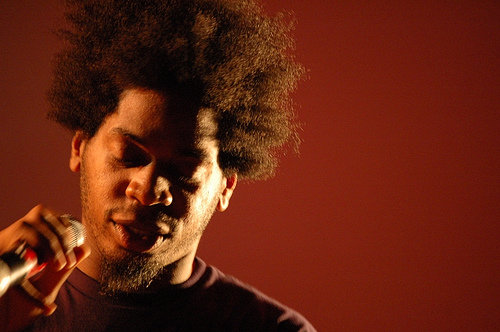

Background information
- Also known as: A.R.E.(2), Alpha Prhyme, A. Edmead
- Origin: Birmingham, England
- Genres: Hip hop, electronica, grime, big beat
- Occupations: Rapper, vocalist, producer
- Instruments: Vocals, rapping
- Years active: 1996–present
- Label: Big Dada
- Website: www.juicealeem.com

Juice Aleem is a British rapper.

== Biography ==
After putting years of energy into the Birmingham hip hop scene, Juice's "Ghetto Grammer" freestyle rap sessions started featuring such other future stars as Ty, Skinnyman and MPHO. In 1996 Will Ashon started up his new Ninja Tune-backed label Big Dada and planned a roster of performers. Bandit of Birmingham's MSI/Asylum crew told Ashon about Aleem. Ashon was impressed with the music and agrees to have Aleem on board. This resulted in the first release of the now iconic record label.

In 1997 Juice featured on Big Dada's first ever release, Misanthropic, under the pseudonym "Alpha Prhyme", a collaboration between himself and Luke Vibert.

As a regular compere and host for Ninja Tune and their events, Aleem ended up working with the veterans of the label, Coldcut, and touring with them around Russia, China, New Zealand, Luxembourg, Korea, Japan, Thailand and Ukraine. Juice is a regular collaborator with artist, producer, emcee Kid Acne.

Juice is co-founder of future-thinking collective Afroflux, and is a member of hip-hop crew Shadowless and experimental rap group Exillians alongside rapper/producer Mike Ladd and Senegalese multidisciplinary artist T.I.E. He is also member of UK rap supergroup Full Metal Rabid which released its debut album 'Rabbit Cuts: Volume 1' in March 2026.

In April 2026 Juice released his EP "Everyting Shiny" produced by Ebu Blackitude.

== Discography ==
=== Albums ===
- Jerusalaam Come, Big Dada Recordings, 2009
- Voodu StarChild, Gamma Proforma, 2017

=== Singles and other releases ===
- "Nanotech Pilots" (12"), Big Dada Recordings, 1997
- Radio Skool: Old New & True, Big Dada Recordings, 2002 (mix CD)
- Gosh! Mix No.2 (CDr), Big Dada Recordings, 2003
- Moveup (CDs, maxi), NovaMute, 2003
- "Heel & Toe" (12", W/Lbl, promo), Marine Parade, 2005
- "Pearl Shot" (12"), Marine Parade, 2005
- First Lesson (CDs, promo), Big Dada Recordings, 2009
- Warriors, Gamma Proforma, 2016

=== Guest appearances ===
- Dynamism (CD, album) The Plan Ninja Tune 1999
- Equilibrium (album) Big Dada Recordings 1999
- Showtime (12", Promo) Big Dada Recordings 2000
- The Plan / Dedicated (Single) Ninja Tune 2000
- Xen Cuts (3xCD) Showtime Ninja Tune 2000
- Bold (album) Lonely Boy (Hard Bossa..)F Communications 2001
- Communicate (12") Bound Big Dada Recordings 2001
- Genetic World (CD) Animal Man, Free, EMI Music(France) 2001
- Music First (2xCD, Comp) Lonely Boy PIAS France 2001
- Serene Bug (CD) North Westerly Winds/Bad News Records 2001
- Extra Yard (The Bouncement Revn.) Big Dada Recordings 2002
- French Sounds (CD) Lonely Boy Catalogue 2002
- In The Red (album) The Living I Ninja Tune 2002
- Lie Low (CD) Lie Low, Zero Gravity Big Dada Recordings 2002
- Dance Crazy, Till A Meal Gets Rotten / Moveup ROMZ 2003
- Director's Cut (album, 2XLP, CD) Moveup, NovaMute 2003
- Moveup (12", Single) NovaMute 2003
- Now & Them (album) Heel 'n' Toe Marine Parade 2003
- Buss (Maxi) Moveup (MAH VIP Mix) NovaMute 2004
- FabricLive. 16 (CD, mixed) Heel 'N' Toe / Fabric (London) 2004
- Futurism Ain't Shit To Me Lonely Boy (Hard Bossa / Kyo 2004
- Master-View (album) Distorted Minds / Ninja Tune 2004
- Merry KissKissMas Melon Farmers / Move Up / Aerosolik 2004
- Needs Must / Capricorn Four (7") Needs Must Surface 2004
- The Ride (Maxi) (Luciano's Danc... NovaMute 2004
- Thirst (album) (2 versions) Thirst NovaMute 2004
- You Can Be Special Too (album) Pearl Shot/Marine Parade 2004
- DJ Face Off (CD) Thirst (Luciano's Dan..DJ Magazine 2005
- Distorted Minds (CD, Enh) Ninja Tune 2005
- Live From The Breadline /Chasin', How It Feels Big Dada 2005
- Total Kaos 05 (CD) Hell 'N' Toe Kaos Records 2005
- Ultra Music Festival (CD) Heel & Toe Ultra Records 2005
- Y4K (CD) Crooked-Bassbin Twins / Distinct'ive Breaks 2005
- Bassbin Twins v.Marine Parade - Heel&Toe /Marine Parade 2006
- Universally Dirty (2xLP) Big Dada Recordings 2006
- You Don't Know Ninja Cuts / DJ Food's MaskMix / Ninja Tune 2008
