= Freedom of speech (disambiguation) =

Freedom of speech is the freedom to speak without censorship or limitation.

Freedom of Speech may also refer to:

- Freedom of Speech (painting), a 1943 painting by Norman Rockwell

== Albums ==
- The Iceberg/Freedom of Speech... Just Watch What You Say!, a 1989 album by Ice-T
- Free Speech (album), a 1970 album by Eddie Harris
- Freedom of Speech (mixtape), by Freeway
- Freedom of Speech (Speech Debelle album)
- Freedom of Speech, a mixtape by Ghetto (now known as Ghetts)

== Songs ==
- "Freedom of Speech", a song by Ice-T, performed with his band Body Count
- "Freedom of Speech", a song by Iceberg Slimm
- "Freddom of Speech", a song by J. Cole from D-Day: A Gangsta Grillz Mixtape
