= IG Culture =

British broken beat musician

IG Culture is a London musician and performer and pioneer of the broken beat movement. His production features rhythms and hybrids of several musical styles such as jazz-fusion, funk and soul.

== Musical career ==
IG Culture first became known as a member of the hip-hop duo Dodge City Productions in 1990. After the demise of that outfit, he founded an independent record label One Drop Interouter which released four albums. Later, he worked with the People label and founded the Main Squeeze label. He now runs the CoOp presents label with Alex Phountzi.

IG Culture produced Jazz Brat, an album by Japanese jazz artist Monday Michiru in 1995, and appeared on the Roots Manuva album Brand New Second Hand in 1999. In 2001, he compiled and released a various-artists album called Inspirations album followed by a 2-CD set of the same name in 2003. He also produced tracks from the Les Nubians album One Step Forward including the title track released in 2003.

== New Sector Movements ==
Circa 2000, IG Culture founded the New Sector Movements project. While predominantly consisting of work by Culture himself, the project also serves as a collective featuring a number of broken beat artists. New Sector Movements signed with Virgin Records and its debut release was the 2001 EP No Tricks, which was followed by the Download This album later the same year. In 2004 the project released its second album Turn It Up, this time credited to NSM.

== Discography ==
- The Clarity EP (1992) as Dodge City Productions
- No Tricks EP (2001) with New Sector Movements
- Download This (2001) with New Sector Movements
- Inspirations (2001)
- Inspirations (2CD) (2003)
- Turn It Up (2004)
- Zen Badizm (2008) available only in Japan
- Soulful Shanghai (2012)
- These Times (2023) with New Sector Movements
