= All Things to All Men =

All Things to All Men may refer to:

- A phrase from the First Epistle to the Corinthians
- "All Things to All Men" (song), 2002 song by The Cinematic Orchestra featuring Roots Manuva
- All Things to All Men (film), 2013 British film
