= Speech Therapy (album) =

Studio album by Speech Debelle
- Released: 1 June 2009
- Recorded: Melbourne, Australia; London, UK
- Genre: Alternative hip hop; jazz rap
- Length: 51:16
- Label: Big Dada
- Producer: Wayne "Lotek" Bennett; Plutonic Lab; Mike Lindsay; Ciaran "DreaKey" Fahy; Speech Debelle (co).

Speech Debelle chronology
Speech Therapy (2009)	Freedom of Speech (2012)

Singles from Speech Therapy
- 1. "Searching" Released: 10 November 2008; 2. "The Key" Released: 15 March 2009; 3. "Go Then, Bye" Released: 25 May 2009; 4. "Better Days" Released: 27 July 2009; 5. "Spinnin'" Released: 14 September 2009

"Speech Therapy"
Excerpt of title track

Speech Therapy is the debut album from British rapper Speech Debelle. It was awarded the British Mercury Prize in 2009.

== Creation ==
The album was released in the United Kingdom on 31 May 2009. The album was led by a white label limited release of "Searching". Thereafter the album had three singles released, "The Key", "Better Days" featuring Micachu, "Go Then, Bye" and finally "Spinning".

Recorded mostly in Australia, the album was created by Debelle, Wayne Lotek and Plutonic Lab (who produced "The Key" and "Better Days") and Big Dada founder Will Ashon, the album documented her formative years in London. She has cited her biggest influences on the album as Tracy Chapman and Meshell Ndegeocello. Unlike many other hip hop albums, the tracks eschew the use of samples and rely instead on live instrumentals.

== Reception ==
"The Key" won Best Budget Video for Pop, Dance, Urban at the UK Music Video Awards in 2009.

Debelle's single from the Speech Therapy, "Spinnin" has been re-worked by Tinchy Stryder and Dionne Bromfield and will be used as one of the official anthems of the 2012 Summer Olympics in London. In March 2011 she performed three songs from the album for Canal Street TV in France.

=== Mercury Prize ===
On 21 July 2009 Speech Therapy was announced as one of the twelve shortlisted albums for the year's Mercury Music Award. She became the first woman to win the award in seven years. Speech Therapy was considered an upset to more well-known competitors including The Horrors, Florence and the Machine, Kasabian and Friendly Fires.

Speech Therapy won Speech Debelle the 2009 Mercury Prize, becoming the first hip hop artist since Dizzee Rascal in 2003 to win the award. After the win, sales of Speech Therapy were comparatively low to other Mercury winners, selling only around 3,000 copies at the time of winning the prize. Since her win, the album's sales totalled at 15,000 as of 2012.

Although this is still a low sales increase for a prize winner, the market for British hip-hop (not including Grime) is comparably small to other genres; this amount is more than other independent British hip hop artists, such as Akala. The album peaked on the UK Albums Chart at 65.

== Reviews ==
Professional ratings
Review scores
Source	Rating
Allmusic	3.5/5 stars
The Guardian	3/5 stars
The Independent	3/5 stars
NME	(8/10)
The Observer	(favourable)
Pitchfork Media	(7.5/10)
Q	3/5 stars
The Sunday Times	4/5 stars
The Times	5/5 stars

In a review of the album, The Guardian said "Debelle's songs are vulnerable, open, unafraid. The overall sound...is full of light and air, acoustic guitars and pianos. There is a gracious, almost stately air to the record, yet the songs still sound entirely joyous." Paul Macinnes of The Guardian wrote "There's something intriguing about Speech Debelle, with a voice both husky and sweet, and a back story that's emotive if unclear." Macinnes also nominated Speech Therapy as his favourite album of 2009. OHM Monthly cited Speech's work as "biggest thing in UK hip-hop for many a long year". The Times praised the production of the album and named it the 76th best album of the 2000s.

In the US, Pitchfork gave a favorable review and praising her relaxed, conversational delivery. According to Pitchfork, "Some hip-hop fans will likely write her off because the usual American rap signifiers-- samples, seething synths, bombastic beats, and buckets of braggadocio-- play scant part in her artistic agenda."

== Track listing ==
No.	Title	Writer(s)	Length
1.	"Searching"	C. Elliot; W. Bennett; T. Bennett	3:33
2.	"The Key"	C. Elliot; L. Ryan	3:00
3.	"Better Days" (featuring Micachu)	C. Elliot; L. Ryan; M. Levi	4:00
4.	"Spinnin"	C. Elliot; M. Lindsay	3:37
5.	"Go Then, Bye"	C. Elliot; C. Fahy	4:29
6.	"Daddy's Little Girl"	C. Elliot; W. Bennett; P. Marks; D. McLean	3:52
7.	"Bad Boy"	C. Elliot; W. Bennett; C. Dalton	4:20
8.	"Wheels in Motion" (featuring Roots Manuva)	C. Elliot; W. Bennett; R. Smith; D. McLean	3:28
9.	"Live & Learn"	C. Elliot; M. Lindsay	3:29
10.	"Working Weak"	C. Elliot; W. Bennett; C. Dalton	3:20
11.	"Buddy Love"	C. Elliot; W. Bennett; P. Marks	4:12
12.	"Finish This Album"	C. Elliot; W. Bennett; S. Stocking	5:11
13.	"Speech Therapy"	C. Elliot; W. Bennett; A. Boot	4:45
