= Too Cold =

Single by Roots Manuva

from the album Awfully Deep
- Released: 21 March 2005
- Genre: Hip hop
- Length: 3:58
- Label: Big Dada
- Songwriters: Rodney Smith; Andrew Michael Ross; Ralph Lamb
- Producers: Roots Manuva; The Easy Access Orchestra

Roots Manuva singles chronology
"Colossal Insight" (2005)	"Too Cold" (2005)	"Buff Nuff" (2008)

"Too Cold" is a 2005 single by British rapper Roots Manuva. It was released as a single from Awfully Deep. It peaked at number 39 on the UK Singles Chart. Prefix magazine characterized the track for its "plodding gothic beat and sing-along self-inflective chorus". The song's string-laced production has been compared to a "West End musical".

== Track listing ==
CD edition
No.	Title	Length
1.	"Too Cold (Radio Edit)"	3:03
2.	"Too Cold (Sa-Ra Radio Edit)"	3:37
3.	"Too Cold (Nightmares on Wax Radio Edit)"	4:42
4.	"Too Cold (Go! Team Radio Edit)"	3:25
5.	"No Love"	4:01

12 inch edition: side A
No.	Title	Length
1.	"Too Cold (Original)"	3:03
2.	"Too Cold (Instrumental)"	3:03
3.	"Too Cold (Acapella)"	3:03

12 inch edition: side B
No.	Title	Length
1.	"Too Cold (Sa-Ra Remix)"	3:37
2.	"Too Cold (Nightmares on Wax Remix)"	4:42
3.	"Too Cold (Go! Team Remix)"	3:25

== Charts ==
Chart	Peak position
UK Singles (OCC)	39
