= Witness (1 Hope) =

Single by Roots Manuva

from the album Run Come Save Me
- Released: July 1, 2001
- Recorded: 2001; Blow Yard Studios (London, England)
- Genre: Hip hop; dancehall
- Length: 4:15
- Label: Big Dada; Ninja Tune
- Songwriter: Rodney Smith
- Producer: Smith

Roots Manuva singles chronology
| "Motion 5000" (1999) | "Witness (1 Hope)" (2001) | "Dreamy Days" (2001) |

Music video
- "Witness (1 Hope)" on YouTube

"Witness (1 Hope)" (better known as "Witness the Fitness") is a song by British rapper Roots Manuva, released as the first single from his second studio album Run Come Save Me (2001). A hip hop song with influences of dancehall and funk music and an electronically-inspired bass line, it contains lyrical references to Roots Manuva's British cultural roots with a melody that deliberately resembles the theme song to TV show Doctor Who. Record labels Big Dada and Ninja Tune released "Witness (1 Hope)" in various formats during July 2001.

The song was a minor commercial success in the United Kingdom, where it briefly appeared on the UK Singles Chart and peaked at number 45 in August 2001. It won acclaim from music critics for the sonically diverse production, along with Roots Manuva's embrace of British cultural tropes, as opposed to the American cultural dominance seen throughout hip hop at the time. A music video for "Witness (1 Hope)" directed by Mat Kirkby, which features Roots Manuva taking part in a sports day at his previous, real-life primary school, also won praise for its humorous and original plot.

== Background and composition ==
The song's production contains a "huge, electronic bass line" influenced by "stuttering, organic funk" and Jamaican dancehall, as well as a "pummelling low end" and "pulsating, throbbing rhythms" similar to those found in the work of production group Organized Noize. Roots Manuva deliberately engineered the base line as a "rickety... squelchy stamp of noise" as a protest against the poor quality of many sound systems used in music clubs at the time, and the melody was intended to mimic the theme song to the television programme Doctor Who. Roots Manuva's rapping, which he described as "talk[ing for] three minutes over the top of [the production]", consists of "relentless, loping rhymes" that contrast with the "righteousness" of his Jamaican heritage with many references to British culture, such as eating cheese on toast and drinking the alcoholic beverage bitter.

== Release and reception ==
"Witness (1 Hope)" was first released to CD, 12-inch and 7-inch vinyl as well as digital retailers in the United Kingdom on 1 July 2001 via record label Ninja Tune. Fellow label Big Dada began distributing it themselves as a 12-inch single on 23 July 2001, as well as a CD maxi single on 30 July 2001. It entered the UK Singles Chart on the chart dated 4 August 2001, but left the chart after only two further weeks on it, during which time it peaked at number 45.

The song received acclaim from many music critics, who praised the song's complex production and Roots Manuva's embracing of his own culture, in contrast to the American themes dominating hip hop music at the time. Christian Hopwood of BBC Music praised the lyricism and noted that it was "hard to imagine any MC from the West Side issuing forth... [such] lactose truth[s]", whilst AllMusic's John Bush lauded it as "the best British rap single since Tricky's 'Aftermath'" (1994). Nin Chan of RapReviews cited its backing track as an example of the "absolutely sterling" production found on Run Come Save Me, and claimed that it would "incite bouts of hip-shaking on any dancefloor".

In a retrospective review, Robin Howells of The Quietus described the song as a "manifestation of UK hip-hop's anxieties about identity (mainly in relation to US rap) by proxy" since the impact of British grime musicians in popular culture had made it "easy to take Britishness – and more specific local identity – as a given". Colin McKean, writing for the same publication, felt that the song was "so colossal it would always overshadow the album that bore it, no matter how good the album was".

== Music video ==
The music video for "Witness (1 Hope)", directed by Mat Kirkby, depicts Roots Manuva returning to his real-life former primary school, Woodmansterne Primary School, and competing in their sports day in a "revenge fantasy" for having never been good at sport during his time there. As he wins every single event, the initially impressed children become angry at his success.

The video was also received positively: NME remarked that "Witness (1 Hope)" "deserves to live in eternity for its video alone", calling it "hilarious" and also commented on how Roots Manuva's desire in the video to "rework the past and make new sense of his surroundings" is a theme found throughout the music of Run Come Save Me. Adam Buxton of The Guardian called it "joyful" whilst praising the plot, describing it as a "simple idea married to a great track", and the "terrific performances" of both Roots Manuva (whom he called "cool, handsome and funny") and the children. Roots Manuva, who devised the plot for the video himself, would remark in 2005 that "I've never since been able to do a video that has impacted on people as much" as the video for "Witness (1 Hope)" had.

== Usage in media ==
"Witness (1 Hope)" appears in the episode "Throw to the Wolves" of Season 4 of the show, The Circle. The song also appears in the 2006 film Children of Men and in the first episode of teen series Skins and an IKEA advert in 2020. It also appears in an episode of the show Ted Lasso.

== Formats and track listings ==
- CD single, 12" vinyl single and digital download (United Kingdom)
1. "Witness (1 Hope)" – 4:15
2. "Witness (1 Hope)" (Part 2 In the Flesh Mix) – 3:58
3. "Son of the Soil" – 4:10
- 7" vinyl single (United Kingdom)
1. "Witness (1 Hope)" – 4:15
2. "Witness (1 Hope)" (Walworth Road Rockers Dub)" – 3:55

== Charts ==
| Chart (2001) | Peak position |
|---|---|
| UK Dance (OCC) | 1 |
| UK Hip Hop/R&B (OCC) | 11 |
| UK Indie (OCC) | 5 |
| UK Singles (OCC) | 45 |
