= Every Day (album) =

Studio album by the Cinematic Orchestra
- Released: 27 April 2002
- Studios: Four Seasons Media Productions (St. Louis, Missouri); Blows Yard Studios (London); AIM Studios (London); Moolah Rouge Studios (Stockport)
- Genres: Nu jazz; downtempo
- Length: 60:14
- Label: Ninja Tune
- Producers: Phil France; Jason Swinscoe

The Cinematic Orchestra chronology
Remixes 98–2000 (2000)	Every Day (2002)	Man with a Movie Camera (2003)

Professional ratings
Review scores
Source	Rating
AllMusic	4/5 stars
Pitchfork	(8.6/10)

Every Day is the second studio album by the Cinematic Orchestra. It was released through Ninja Tune on 27 April 2002 in Japan and 13 May 2002 elsewhere. It was re-released in November 2003 with two additional tracks. It was written and produced by band members Phil France and Jason Swinscoe. In 2010, it was awarded a gold certification from the Independent Music Companies Association, which indicated sales of at least 100,000 copies throughout Europe.

== Track listing ==
1. "All That You Give" (feat. Fontella Bass) – 6:10
2. "Burn Out" – 10:13
3. "Flite" – 6:35
4. "Evolution" (feat. Fontella Bass) – 6:38
5. "Man with the Movie Camera" – 9:09
6. "All Things to All Men" (feat. Roots Manuva) – 11:04
7. "Everyday" – 10:18

Additional tracks on re-release:

8. "Oregon" – 3:54
9. "Horizon" (feat. Niara Scarlett) – 4:44

Additional tracks on 20th Anniversary Edition:

10. "Semblance" – 2:41
11. "Flite" (Original Version) – 6:57

== Samples and inspiration ==
- The album's longest track, "All Things to All Men", samples John Barry's original soundtrack to the 1968 film Petulia.
- The track "Man with the Movie Camera" bears strong thematic similarities to music composed by Bernard Herrmann for the film The 7th Voyage of Sinbad (1958), in particular, a scene in which Sinbad arrives in Baghdad.
- "Flite" borrows from Eberhard Weber's piece "Quiet Departures" ("Fluid Rustle", 1979).

== Alternate releases ==
- In Japan, the album was released on Beat Records a couple of weeks earlier than the original UK album. It contained nine tracks: the seven from the original release plus "Oregon" and a track called "Semblance".

== Release history ==
Country	Date
Japan	27 April 2002
United Kingdom	13 May 2002
United States	28 May 2002
