= 4everevolution =

Studio album by Roots Manuva
- Released: 3 October 2011
- Genre: Hip-hop
- Length: 65:09
- Label: Big Dada
- Producer: Gibbs King

Roots Manuva chronology
Slime & Reason (2008)	4everevolution (2011)	Bleeds (2015)

Professional ratings
Aggregate scores
Source	Rating
Metacritic	75/100
Review scores
Source	Rating
AllMusic	4/5 stars
BBC	favorable
Blurt Magazine	5/5 stars
Clash	8/10
Cokemachineglow	74%
Drowned in Sound	8/10
MusicOMH	3/5 stars
NME	3.5/5 stars
The Observer	3/5 stars
PopMatters	6/10

4everevolution is the eighth studio album by the English rapper Roots Manuva. It was released on 3 October 2011 on the Big Dada label.

== Critical reception ==
4everevolution was met with "generally favorable" reviews from critics. At Metacritic, which assigns a weighted average rating out of 100 to reviews from mainstream publications, this release received an average score of 75 based on 19 reviews.

In a review for AllMusic, critic reviewer Jon O'Brien wrote: "4everevolution, shows he [Manuva] can still summarize the state of the nation more succinctly in one line that most MCs half his age manage over the course of an entire album. 4everevolution is an appropriately titled, subtle progression which proves that intelligent hip-hop and accessible urban pop don't have to be mutually exclusive." Reef Younis of Clash said: "The production is crisp and varied; Roots' warm vocal typically hits with soul without being too forcefully firebrand and constant changes in style and tempo gives 4Everevolution the energy to see it through." At Drowned in Sound, Al Horner noted that it was Manuva's "most assured and compelling listen to date."

== Track listing ==
4everevolution track listing
No.	Title	Length
1.	"First Growth"	3:08
2.	"Here We Go Again" (featuring Spikey T)	3:59
3.	"Skid Valley"	2:46
4.	"Who Goes There?"	2:55
5.	"Watch Me Dance"	4:05
6.	"Revelation"	4:17
7.	"Wha' Mek?"	4:40
8.	"Takes Time"	3:13
9.	"Beyond This World"	2:33
10.	"Go Champ"	2:20
11.	"Get the Get" (featuring Rokhsan)	2:41
12.	"Crow Bars"	2:54
13.	"The Throws of It"	7:04
14.	"Noddy"	3:51
15.	"Much Too Plush"	3:13
16.	"The Path" (featuring Rokhsan)	3:14
17.	"Banana Skank"	2:35
18.	"Snakebite" (bonus track)	2:31
19.	"Bust It" (bonus track)	2:52
20.	"It's On" (bonus track)	2:55

== Personnel ==
Musicians

- Roots Manuva – primary artist, bass, violin
- Harry Bennett – drums
- Larry Blackmon – vocals
- Hannah Caughlin – vocals
- Mark Shaffer – guitar
- Bob Earland – drums
- Amazirée – vocals
- Rokhsan – vocals
- The Banana Klan – choir vocals

Production

- Roots Manuva – mixing, producer
- Bob Earland – engineer, mixing
- Theo Gordon – engineer
- Patrick McMahon – engineer, mixing
- Kevin Metcalfe – mastering
- Gibbs King – producer, engineer

== Charts ==
Chart	Peak position
UK Albums (OCC)	59
