= Motion (The Cinematic Orchestra album) =

Studio album by the Cinematic Orchestra
- Released: 27 September 1999
- Genres: Electronic, downtempo, trip hop
- Length: 51:09
- Labels: Ninja Tune, ZEN45 (LP), ZENCD045 (CD), ZENCD45X (Japan CD)

The Cinematic Orchestra chronology
Motion (1999)	Remixes 98–2000 (2000)

Motion is the debut studio album by the Cinematic Orchestra, released on 27 September 1999 on Ninja Tune. The album's concept came from core band member, Jason Swinscoe, who had amassed various samples - drum patterns, basslines and melody samples - that had inspired and influenced him. He then presented them to a group of musicians to learn and then improvise around. The resulting draft tracks were then re-mixed on computer by Swinscoe to create the finished album.

In 2012, it was awarded a double silver certification from the Independent Music Companies Association which indicated sales of at least 40,000 copies throughout Europe.

== Critical reception ==
Professional ratings
Review scores
Source	Rating
AllMusic	4/5 stars
Pitchfork	(6.7/10)

Stanton Swihart, writing for AllMusic, stated:

...the songs on Motion are by turns eerie, lush, edgy, expansive, gritty, intensely powerful, and gorgeous. Sometimes an album comes along that forces you to reconfigure and re-evaluate all of the assumptions you had previously made about music in order to realize how vast and endless the possibilities are; this is one of those albums.

Additionally, the album's success led to the band being asked to perform at the 1999 Director's Guild Awards ceremony for the presentation of the Lifetime Achievement Award to film director Stanley Kubrick.

== Track listing ==
All tracks written and produced by Jason Swinscoe, except where noted.

No.	Title	Length
1.	"Durian" (written and produced by Jason Swinscoe and Eva Katzenmaier)	7:00
2.	"Ode to the Big Sea"	5:42
3.	"Night of the Iguana"	13:21
4.	"Channel 1 Suite"	5:50
5.	"BlueBirds"	5:06
6.	"And Relax!"	4:55
7.	"Diabolus"	9:15
8.	"Channel 1 Suite (Hefner mix)" (Japanese version bonus track)	4:41
9.	"Ode to the Big Sea (Four Tet mix)" (Japanese version bonus track)	7:30

== Personnel ==
- Jason Swinscoe – producer
- Tom Chant – soprano sax, alto sax, acoustic piano, electric piano
- Jamie Coleman – flugelhorn, trumpet
- Phil France – acoustic bass, electric bass
- T. Daniel Howard – drums
- Eva Katzenmaier – producer
- Alex James – acoustic piano, electric piano (Now music teacher at Rochester Independent College)
- Saidi Kanba – percussions
