= Brand New Second Hand =

Studio album by Roots Manuva
- Released: 22 March 1999
- Genres: Reggae; hip-hop; dub
- Length: 65:05
- Label: Big Dada
- Producers: Roots Manuva; IG Culture; Hylton Smythe; Wayne Bennett; J.T.; Jam El; V.R.S.

Roots Manuva chronology
Brand New Second Hand (1999)	Run Come Save Me (2001)

Singles from Brand New Second Hand
- 1. "Juggle Tings Proper" Released: 22 February 1999; 2. "Motion 5000" Released: 5 July 1999

Brand New Second Hand is the debut studio album by English hip-hop musician Roots Manuva. It was released on Big Dada in 1999.

== Critical reception ==
Professional ratings
Review scores
Source	Rating
AllMusic	4/5 stars
Alternative Press	3/5
The Guardian	4/5 stars
Melody Maker	4.5/5 stars
NME	8/10
Pitchfork	9.5/10
The Rolling Stone Album Guide	4/5 stars
Spin	7/10

Paul Cooper of Pitchfork gave the album a 9.5 out of 10, saying, "I find Roots Manuva's delivery addictive, compelling, and, above all, heartfelt." In 2014, Oscar Rickett of Vice said, "It's hard to believe it's been 15 years since this album was made. He added, "It's easier to believe that nothing as good as it has ever come out of the UK hip-hop scene."

NME named it the 37th best album of 1999.

== Track listing ==
No.	Title	Producer(s)	Length
1.	"Movements"	Roots Manuva	4:12
2.	"Dem Phonies"	IG Culture	4:26
3.	"Juggle Tings Proper"	Roots Manuva	5:04
4.	"Inna"	Hylton Smythe	4:31
5.	"Soul Decay"	Wayne Bennett	3:49
6.	"Baptism"	Roots Manuva	4:21
7.	"Strange Behaviour"	Hylton Smythe	3:52
8.	"Organ Skit"		0:16
9.	"Big Tings Gwidarn"	Roots Manuva	4:42
10.	"Sinking Sands"	Wayne Bennett	4:10
11.	"Wisdom Fall"	Roots Manuva	3:10
12.	"Roots-Fi Discotheque Skit"		0:31
13.	"Clockwork"	Roots Manuva, J.T.	3:57
14.	"Cornmeal Dumpling"	Roots Manuva, Jam El	5:27
15.	"Fever"	V.R.S.	4:00
16.	"Oh Yeah..."	Roots Manuva	3:18
17.	"Motion 5000"	Roots Manuva	5:11

== Credits ==
=== Co-vocalists ===
- IG Culture on "Dem Phonies"
- Wildflower on "Baptism"
- Seanie T. on "Big Tings Gwidarn"
- Sober Now on "Sinking Sands
- Thomas E on "Cornmeal Dumpling"

=== Miscellaneous ===
Turntables on "Soul Decay"

- Jodi

Guitar on "Fever"

- Richard Molyneaux

String instruments on "Motion 5000"

- Isabelle Dunn and Stella Page

== Charts ==
Chart	Peak position
UK Independent Albums (OCC)	30
UK R&B Albums (OCC)	18

== Certifications ==
Certifications for Brand New Second Hand
Region	Certification	Certified units/sales
United Kingdom (BPI)	Silver	60,000^{^}
^{^} Shipments figures based on certification alone.
