= To Build a Home =

2007 single by the Cinematic Orchestra featuring Patrick Watson

Single by The Cinematic Orchestra featuring Patrick Watson

from the album Ma Fleur
- B-side: Grey Reverend Version; "Child Song"
- Released: 29 October 2007
- Recorded: 2006
- Studio: Chung King Studios (New York, NY)
- Genre: Chamber pop
- Length: 6:11
- Label: Ninja Tune; Domino
- Songwriters: Phil France; Jason Swinscoe; Patrick Watson
- Producer: Jason Swinscoe

The Cinematic Orchestra singles chronology
"Man with the Movie Camera" (2003)	"To Build a Home" (2007)	"Breathe" (2007)

"To Build a Home" is a song by English electronic music group the Cinematic Orchestra, with vocals and piano performed by Canadian singer-songwriter Patrick Watson. It was released as the second single from the group's third studio album, Ma Fleur (2007), on 29 October 2007.

The song's music video was a short narrative film that also included the song "Breathe" and ran to over 12 minutes. Shot on location in Cumbria, the video was premiered on Channel 4, featuring the actors Peter Mullan and Julia Ford, and directed by animator Andrew Griffin.

== Composition ==
"To Build a Home" is a piano ballad that serves as the opening track to its companion album, Ma Fleur, though it serves as the closing track on the Domino-released versions of the album. It features vocals from Canadian singer-songwriter Patrick Watson, who also has writing credits on the song alongside Phil France and Jason Swinscoe of the Cinematic Orchestra. Watson also performed piano for the song.

The instrumental begins with about three to four piano chords looped, building up to a more loud and grand point, introducing strings. During this portion of the instrumental, Watson sings over both the piano and strings, eventually climaxing with falsetto vocals. Lyrically, the song deals with Watson wanting to create a house for him and his lover. What happens with the house is unknown, resulting it to be merely metaphorical in place of a resting place for the two.

== Release and reception ==
The song was first released on 29 October 2007 as a 7" vinyl single by Ninja Tune in the United Kingdom. It was backed with a cover version of the song performed by Grey Reverend. A 7" single was also released in the U.S. by the Domino Recording Company's U.S. division, which was backed with "Child Song". In 2015, the song peaked at number 96 on the French Singles Chart.

"To Build a Home" had a positive reception from music critics. Critics often saw Watson's vocal performance as a highlight on the song. For The Observer, Stuart Nicholson wrote that "Swinscoe transforms three- and four-chord vamps into something special." For Drowned in Sound, Shain Shapiro regarded the vocals as "bellowing [and] haunting", while Tyler Fisher of Sputnikmusic said that Watson "nearly steals the show". Maggie Fremont of Vulture called it "one of the most emotional songs ever performed."

"To Build a Home" has been used in several different television shows and films, including Suits (Season 2 Episode 5), This Is Us,Tinker Tailor Soldier Spy, One Tree Hill, Grey's Anatomy, Criminal Minds, Friday Night Lights, Orange Is the New Black, 9-1-1, Schitts Creek, Skam France, The Gifted, Scenes from a Marriage, and The Big C.

In March 2008 the song was used in an acclaimed Australian TV advert for the soft drink brand Schweppes. At the 2018 Winter Olympics, figure skaters Julian Yee and Dmitri Aliev used the song in their respective performances. It was reported in February 2022 that the song had been streamed over 374 million times.

== Track listing ==
- Ninja Tune (ZEN7 200; UK 7" vinyl single)

Side A
No.	Title	Length
1.	"To Build a Home"

Side B
No.	Title	Length
1.	"To Build a Home" (Grey Reverend Version)

- Domino (DNO 148; U.S. 7" vinyl single)

Side A
No.	Title	Length
1.	"To Build a Home" (edit)

Side B
No.	Title	Length
1.	"Child Song"

== Personnel ==
Personnel adapted from Ma Fleur liner notes.

Performers

- Izzi Dunn – strings
- Phil France – double bass
- Jote Oshan – strings
- Stella Page – strings
- Antonia Pagulatos – strings
- Patrick Watson – vocals, piano

Technical personnel

- Phil France – assistant engineer, string arrangements
- Steve Hodge – mixer, recording engineer
- Andy Marcin-Kowski – assistant engineer
- Stella Page – string arrangements
- Dominic Smith – assistant engineer
- Jason Swinscoe – mixer, producer

== Charts ==
Chart (2012–2013)	Peak position
France (SNEP)	96

== Certifications ==
Region	Certification	Certified units/sales
Australia (ARIA)	Gold	35,000^{‡}
Canada (Music Canada)	4× Platinum	320,000^{‡}
Denmark (IFPI Danmark)	Gold	45,000^{‡}
Italy (FIMI)	Platinum	70,000^{‡}
New Zealand (RMNZ)	2× Platinum	60,000^{‡}
Spain (Promusicae)	Platinum	60,000^{‡}
United Kingdom (BPI)	Platinum	600,000^{‡}
United States (RIAA)	2× Platinum	2,000,000^{‡}
^{‡} Sales+streaming figures based on certification alone.
