= Crooze FM =

- Belgium
- Broadcast area: Flanders and Brussels
- Frequencies: Until 2017: 104.2 MHz (Antwerp); 106.5 MHz (Brussels); 106.4 MHz (Ghent)

Programming
- Language: Dutch
- Format: Smooth Jazz, Jazz, Soul

Ownership
- Owner: Frank Leysen

History
- First air date: 2004
- Last air date: 15 May 2024; 2 years ago

Links
- Webcast: Listen live
- Website: Official website at the Wayback Machine (archived 2024-07-10)

Crooze FM (styled CROOZE.fm, later CROOZE.eu) was a Belgian Jazz radio station created in 2004, broadcasting in Antwerp, Brussels and Ghent and specialized in mainly Jazz, Soul and Lounge. Other genres played regularly on Crooze FM included R&B music, Nu-jazz, Funk, Deep House and Chill.

In 2004 and 2005, Crooze FM was elected in the Radiovisie.be Radio Awards. In 2004 as Best Newcomer and in 2005 Crooze won the awards Best Radiostation and Best Website.

Crooze became an internet-only station in 2017. In 2022, it was taken over by Raf Geudens and began broadcasting on one of Belgium's national DAB+ multiplexes. However, the station had few listeners and little advertising, and it was not rated by CIM. The last broadcast by Crooze was on 15 May 2024.

By early 2026, its web streams and website no longer appeared to be operational. A fan project NUCROOZE was later launched to preserve the station's musical spirit and programming legacy.
