= Remixes 98–2000 =

Remixes 98-2000

Remix album by the Cinematic Orchestra
- Released: 13 November 2000
- Genres: Electronic, downtempo
- Length: 49:04
- Label: Ninja Tune

The Cinematic Orchestra chronology
Motion (1999)	Remixes 98-2000 (2000)	Every Day (2002)

Professional ratings
Review scores
Source	Rating
AllMusic	link
Pitchfork	6.7/10 link

Remixes 98–2000 is a 2000 album released by the Cinematic Orchestra. It is a remix album, and the tracks are a combination of songs recorded by the band, remixed by other people and songs by other people, remixed by The Cinematic Orchestra.

== Track listing ==
1. "Moving Cities (The Cinematic Orchestra remix)" - Faze Action – 7:50
2. "Channel 1 Suite (Tom Tyler remix)" - The Cinematic Orchestra – 5:15
3. "The Fear Theme (The Cinematic Orchestra's re-interpretation)" - Kenji Eno – 5:48
4. "Guauanco (The Cinematic Orchestra's extended version)" - Les Gammas – 7:35
5. "Panoramica (The Cinematic Orchestra remix)" - Piero Umiliani – 6:27
6. "Vilderness (The Cinematic Orchestra remix)" - Nils Petter Molvær – 6:21
7. "Re-Arrange (The Cinematic Orchestra remix)" - DJ Krust – 9:48

The vinyl release of the album included one additional track:

8. "Ode To The Big Lizard (The Cinematic Orchestra Chameleon mix)" - Tom Tyler
