= Ma Fleur =

2007 studio album by the Cinematic Orchestra

Studio album by the Cinematic Orchestra
- Released: 7 May 2007
- Length: 48:51 (US version)
- Labels: Ninja Tune; Domino
- Producer: Jason Swinscoe

The Cinematic Orchestra chronology
Man with a Movie Camera (2003)	Ma Fleur (2007)	Live at the Royal Albert Hall (2008)

Singles from Ma Fleur
- 1. "Breathe" Released: 9 April 2007; 2. "To Build a Home" Released: 29 October 2007

Professional ratings
Review scores
Source	Rating
AllMusic	3/5 stars
BBC	(unfavourable)
BBC Collective	5/5 stars
Drowned in Sound	8/10 stars
The Guardian	4/5 stars
The Observer	4/5 stars
Okayplayer	3/5 stars
Pitchfork	(6.4/10)
PopMatters	9/10 stars
URB	4/5 stars

Ma Fleur ("my flower" in French) is the fourth full-length release and third proper studio album by the Cinematic Orchestra, released on 7 May 2007. The North American version of the album contains 10 tracks in a different sequence from the UK version and omits "Child Song". The song "To Build a Home" was used in an award-winning 2008 Schweppes Lemonade advertisement called "Burst" and in the 2010 Australian-French film The Tree, and the similar shorter song "That Home" in the trailer for 2011 film Another Earth.

== Track listing ==
=== UK release ===
CD

1. "To Build a Home" – 6:11 (with Patrick Watson)
2. "Familiar Ground" – 4:34 (with Fontella Bass)
3. "Child Song" – 5:14
4. "Music Box" – 5:03 (with Patrick Watson and Lou Rhodes)
5. "Prelude" – 2:43
6. "As the Stars Fall" – 5:55
7. "Into You" – 3:02 (with Patrick Watson)
8. "Ma Fleur" – 4:32
9. "Breathe" – 6:33 (with Fontella Bass)
10. "That Home" – 1:43 (with Patrick Watson)
11. "Time and Space" – 8:42 (with Lou Rhodes)

Vinyl
Side A

1. "To Build a Home"
2. "Familiar Ground"
3. "That Home"

Side B

4. "Child Song"
5. "Music Box"
6. "Ma Fleur"

Side C

7. "Prelude"
8. "As the Stars Fall"
9. "Into You"

Side D

10. "Breathe"
11. "Time and Space"

=== US release (Domino) ===
1. "That Home"
2. "Familiar Ground"
3. "Ma Fleur"
4. "Music Box"
5. "Time and Space"
6. "Prelude"
7. "As the Stars Fall"
8. "Into You"
9. "Breathe"
10. "To Build a Home"

== Certifications ==
Region	Certification	Certified units/sales
United Kingdom (BPI)	Silver	60,000^{‡}
^{‡} Sales+streaming figures based on certification alone.
