= Beloved One =

Studio album by Lou Rhodes
- Released: 2006
- Genre: Folk
- Label: Infinite Bloom, Cooking Vinyl

Lou Rhodes chronology
Beloved One (2006)	Bloom (2007)

Professional ratings
Review scores
Source	Rating
Allmusic	link

Beloved One is Lou Rhodes' first solo album, released in 2006. It was shortlisted for the 2006 Nationwide Mercury Music Prize. It was recorded at Ridge Farm studios. In April 2007, the album was re-released by Cooking Vinyl Records (USA), adding three bonus tracks.

== Track listing ==
1. "Each Moment New"
2. "Tremble"
3. "Treat Her Gently"
4. "Fortress"
5. "No Re-run"
6. "Beloved One"
7. "Save Me"
8. "Inlakesh"
9. "To Survive"
10. "Why"
11. "Deep" (It is a hidden track; i.e. not listed on the album cover.)
