= Bloom (Lou Rhodes album) =

Studio album by Lou Rhodes
- Released: October 1, 2007
- Genre: Folk
- Label: A&G

Lou Rhodes chronology
Beloved One (2006)	Bloom (2007)	One Good Thing (2010)

Bloom is Lou Rhodes' second solo album, released in 2007.

Opening track "The Rain" was released as a single, backed with "Gabriel", an acoustic version of the song by Rhodes' former band Lamb, and "Satellite", a cover version of Elliott Smith's song from his second album.

The album was positively received by the BBC and WalesOnline.

== Track listing ==
1. "The Rain"
2. "Greatness in a Speck of Dust"
3. "Icarus"
4. "Never Loved a Man (Like You)"
5. "All We Are"
6. "Chase All My Winters Away"
7. "This Love"
8. "They Say"
9. "Sister Moon"
10. "Bloom"
