= Dodge City Productions =

Dodge City Productions (DCP) were a British hip hop/acid jazz group based in London formed by IG Culture (real name Ian Grant) and DJ Dodge (real name Roger Drakes). They were one of the leaders of the acid jazz movement, and also received acclaim and success for their remixes, usually done as "City Lick". The group split in the early 1990s, and both members went to have further success in the music industry as solo artists.

== History ==
The group formed in 1991, and signed to the 4th & Broadway record label, their first release being the single "Ain't Going For That" (1992). Further singles followed, and then the group released their debut album Steppin' Up and Out (4th and Broadway, 1993). At this time, the British scene was split between the hardcore music of groups like Hardnoise and Gunshot and the more jazz influenced style of groups like the Young Disciples or Outlaw Posse. DCP had strong ties to the British hip hop scene, and the album featured guest vocals from Bello B of Outlaw Posse and MCM of Caveman.

The group were also much in demand as remixers, providing remixes under the name of "City Lick" for respected artists like Gang Starr and Digital Underground. Both Grant and Drakes continued to have successful remixing careers long after the DCP partnership was dissolved, following the release of their debut album.

== Later careers ==
Following the split of DCP, Grant decided that he wanted to try his hand at running a record label for British artists, an idea that he had had whilst still a member of the group. This started with the creation of the One Drop Interrouter label, and led to Grant becoming well known both as label runner, producer and artist in his own right. He has worked under a variety of pseudonyms in his career, but usually retains the name IG Culture.

Drakes, meanwhile, continued to remix and produce under the DJ Dodge name, travelling all over the world and gaining residencies in many respected clubs. He was the official DJ with Trevor Nelson's MTV Lick parties for five years, and was nominated for the Best Club DJ MOBO award three years running. In 1999 he received a Mobo best Producer nomination for the top 20 hit by Beverley Knight 'Made It back' He also received an Urban Music Seminar contribution award in 2000. Most recently, he has gained a monthly residency at the Ministry of Sound and also his own radio show on Smooth FM. He also records and produces for his own record label, Baby Angel Recordings.

== Discography ==
=== Album ===
- 1993 Steppin Up and Out 4th & Broadway

=== Singles/EPs ===
- 1991 "Ain't Goin For That"
- 1992 The Clarity EP (The Road in Front of Me)
- 1992 "As Long As We're Around"
- 1992 "Unleash Your Love"
