= Awfully Deep =

Studio album by Roots Manuva
- Released: 28 January 2005
- Genre: Hip-hop
- Length: 51:27 (original); 74:42 (limited edition)
- Label: Big Dada
- Producers: Roots Manuva (Lord Gosh); The Easy Access Orchestra; Blackitude; Wayne Bennett; Steve Dub

Roots Manuva chronology
Dub Come Save Me (2002)	Awfully Deep (2005)	Back to Mine: Roots Manuva (2005)

Singles from Awfully Deep
- 1. "Colossal Insight" Released: 17 January 2005; 2. "Too Cold" Released: 21 March 2005

Awfully Deep is a studio album by British alternative hip-hop artist Roots Manuva, released in 2005 by Big Dada.

A limited-edition version of the CD was released, which included a second disc entitled The Noodle Pack: Demos, Versions and Exclusives.

In October 2011, it was awarded a double silver certification from the Independent Music Companies Association (IMPALA), which indicated sales in excess of 40,000 copies throughout Europe.

== Critical reception ==
Professional ratings
Aggregate scores
Source	Rating
Metacritic	80/100
Review scores
Source	Rating
AllMusic	3/5 stars
Blender	3/5 stars
Entertainment Weekly	B+
The Guardian	5/5 stars
Mojo	4/5 stars
NME	9/10
Pitchfork	6.4/10
Q	4/5 stars
Spin	C+
Uncut	4/5 stars

Awfully Deep garnered positive reviews from music critics. At Metacritic, which assigns a normalised rating out of 100 to reviews from mainstream critics, the album received an average score of 80 based on 19 reviews, indicating "generally favorable reviews".

David Peschek of The Guardian gave high praise to the mixture of dancehall, electronic and two tone used throughout the production and Manuva's self-deprecating delivery that's devoid of any "dreary machismo" used by his US contemporaries, concluding that "Smith has crafted an album that is deft, addictive and profoundly musical, and it feels like a fresh-minted classic." A writer for Tiny Mix Tapes praised Smith's electronic dub production and lyricism for having a more "intense, oppressive feel" throughout the album despite a dip in quality in the second half, concluding that "Still, this is great stuff, the music is often awesomely original, and you feel yourself willing Smith on to beat his demons. 'Nuff said." Pitchfork contributor Tom Breihan commented how the record was similar to Radiohead's Kid A, noting how Manuva goes from "street-rap relevance to navel-gazing experimentation" through slow and methodical production and lyrical vocalisation, concluding that "Manuva has the force, vision, and charisma to remain relevant, to keep ahead of the game. He's too good to let the world pass him by, but that's exactly what will happen if he continues to disappear inside himself." Jonah Weiner, writing for Blender, noted how the album goes back and forth from "comically paranoid fantasies ("Awfully Deep", "Too Cold")" to tracks with a "political edge ("Mind to Motion", "The Falling")", calling it "protest music gone gleefully psycho." John Bush of AllMusic said, "Overall, Roots Manuva may have a lot to say during the verses, but when his choruses consist of little more than a repeated line shouted over and over ("Awfully Deep," "Too Cold"), listeners won't be hanging around long enough to decipher his verses."

== Track listing ==
No.	Title	Producer(s)	Length
1.	"Mind 2 Motion"	Lord Gosh	4:46
2.	"Awfully Deep"	Lord Gosh	4:02
3.	"Cause 4 Pause" (featuring DJ MK)	Lord Gosh	1:11
4.	"Colossal Insight"	Lord Gosh	3:45
5.	"Too Cold" (featuring Hazel Sim and DJ MK)	Roots Manuva; The Easy Access Orchestra	3:58
6.	"A Haunting"	Roots Manuva; The Easy Access Orchestra	3:57
7.	"Rebel Heart" (featuring Marshmello)	Roots Manuva	3:33
8.	"Chin High" (featuring DJ MK)	Roots Manuva	5:25
9.	"Babylon Medicine"	Blackitude	3:16
10.	"Pause 4 Cause"	Lord Gosh; Steve Dub	1:28
11.	"Move Ya Loin" (featuring Lotek)	Wayne Lotek	3:12
12.	"Thinking"	Lord Gosh	4:48
13.	"The Falling"	The Easy Access Orchestra	3:52
14.	"Toothbrush"	Lord Gosh	4:14

Limited edition bonus disc
No.	Title	Length
1.	"Chin High (Manuvadelics Version)" (featuring Ricky Rankin & DJ MK)	5.12
2.	"Too Cold (Demo Version)"	3.27
3.	"Colossal Insight (Manoustic at Reading)" (featuring Ricky Rankin & DJ MK)	3.59
4.	"Rebel Heart" (Manuvadelics Version)" (featuring Ricky Rankin & DJ MK)	3.18
5.	"The Falling (Demo Version) / This World Is Mine (Demo Version)"	7.19

== Charts ==
Chart	Peak position
UK Albums (OCC)	24
