= Freedom of Speech (Speech Debelle album) =

Studio album by Speech Debelle
- Released: 13 Feb 2012
- Recorded: London, UK
- Genre: Hip Hop
- Length: 53:02
- Label: Big Dada; BD193
- Producer: Kwes.

Speech Debelle chronology
Speech Therapy (2009)	Freedom of Speech (2012)

Singles from Freedom of Speech
- 1. "Studio Backpack Rap" Released: 9 November 2011; 2. "I'm With It" Released: 20 February 2012

Professional ratings
Aggregate scores
Source	Rating
Metacritic	62/100
Review scores
Source	Rating
AllMusic	4/5 stars
MTV	5/5 stars

Freedom of Speech is the second album by British rapper Speech Debelle. The record was recorded in London, United Kingdom and produced entirely by Kwes. It was her second album release on Big Dada Recordings.

== Reception ==
At Metacritic, which assigns a weighted average score out of 100 to reviews from mainstream critics, Freedom of Speech received an average score of 62% based on 17 reviews, indicating "generally favorable reviews".

The album prompted Trebuchet Magazine to describe Debelle as 'a fiery, if naïve, seeker of justice and truth', and said "she has a cracked lusciousness to her voice that strongly recalls Martina Topley-Bird's most meltingly sexy moments on Tricky's Maxinquaye."

MTV gave the album 5/5 stars, and said, "What makes this a truly great hip hop album is that her words, piling up on one another, take on the quality of incantations — and that those incantations take on a life of their own." According to AllMusic in a review, "Speech Debelle is now the most interesting and possibly the most exciting British MC on the scene."

== Track listing ==
No.	Title	Writer(s)	Producer(s)	Length
1.	"Studio Backpack Rap"	Elliot, C; Sey, Kwesi	Kwes.	4:01
2.	"Live for the Message"	Elliot, C; Sey, K; McKoy, J	Kwes.	3:51
3.	"Blaze Up a Fire" (featuring Roots Manuva and Realism)	Elliot, C; Richards, D; Sey, K; Smith, R	Kwes.	4:19
4.	"Elephant in the Living Room"	Elliot, C; Ryan, L; Sey, K	Kwes.	4:02
5.	"X Marks The Spot"	Elliot, C; O' Fathaigh, C	Kwes.	3:49
6.	"Angel Wings"	Elliot, C; O' Fathaigh, C	Kwes.	3:29
7.	"Shawshank Redemption"	Elliot, C; Sey, K	Kwes.	4:23
8.	"I'm With It"	Elliot, C; White, F	Kwes.	3:43
9.	"The Problem"	Elliot, C; Sey, K; Wynter, L	Kwes.	4:15
10.	"Collapse"	Elliot, C; Sey, K	Kwes.	5:04
11.	"Eagle Eye" (featuring Realism)	Elliot, C; Richards, D; Sey, K	Kwes.	4:53
12.	"Sun Dog"	Elliot, C; Sey, K	Kwes.	7:13
Total length:				53:02
