= Will Ashon =

- Born: 1969 (age 56–57); Leicester, England
- Genres: Hip hop
- Occupations: Journalist, record label executive, novelist
- Label: Big Dada
- Website: Big Dada Recordings

Will Ashon (born 1969) is an English writer and novelist, former music journalist and founder of the Big Dada imprint of Ninja Tune records.

Ashon was educated at Countesthorpe Community College and Balliol College, Oxford. In the mid-1990s he worked as a music journalist specialising in hip hop for publications including Trace, Muzik and Hip Hop Connection. In 1997 he started the record label Big Dada in conjunction with Ninja Tune, signing and releasing albums by artists including Roots Manuva, Diplo, Speech Debelle and Wiley.

His works of fiction include three novels titled Clear Water (2006), The Heritage (2008) and The Passengers (2022) (all published by Faber and Faber). Strange Labyrinth, a non-fictional exploration of Epping Forest, was published in 2017, and a collection of dialogues titled Not Far from the Junction, published by London independent publisher Open Pen. He left Big Dada in February 2014. In 2019 he returned to the subject of hip hop and released a "genre defying" book about the Wu-Tang Clan's debut album entitled Chamber Music: Enter the Wu-Tang (in 36 Pieces).
