= Run Come Save Me =

Studio album by Roots Manuva
- Released: 13 August 2001
- Genre: Hip-hop
- Length: 57:53
- Label: Big Dada
- Producers: Wayne Bennett; Lord Gosh; Al Mono; Hylton Smythe; Skillamanjaro

Roots Manuva chronology
Brand New Second Hand (1999)	Run Come Save Me (2001)	Dub Come Save Me (2002)

Singles from Run Come Save Me
- 1. "Witness (1 Hope)" Released: 23 July 2001; 2. "Dreamy Days" Released: 8 October 2001

Run Come Save Me is the second studio album by English hip-hop musician Roots Manuva. It was released on Big Dada in 2001.

== Critical reception ==
Professional ratings
Review scores
Source	Rating
AllMusic	4.5/5 stars
The Guardian	4/5 stars
Muzik	4/5
NME	8/10
Pitchfork	4.1/10
Q	4/5 stars
The Rolling Stone Album Guide	4/5 stars
Spin	7/10

John Bush of AllMusic wrote, "Roots Manuva handled every type of song with flowing confidence and a bemused air, whether it was a club jam or a message track." Alex Needham of NME called it "Brit-rap's finest hour to date." Christian Hopwood of BBC Music felt that the album "should be lauded for its degree of musical invention and individual approach to the genre".

Q listed it as one of the best 50 albums of 2001.

== Track listing ==
No.	Title	Producer(s)	Length
1.	"No Strings..."		1:25
2.	"Bashment Boogie" (featuring Ricky Rankin)	Wayne Bennett	3:19
3.	"Witness (1 Hope)"	Lord Gosh	4:15
4.	"Join the Dots" (featuring Chali 2na)	Al Mono	3:59
5.	"Black Box Interlude"		0:22
6.	"Ital Visions"	Hylton Smythe	4:42
7.	"Kicking the Cack"	Lord Gosh	3:36
8.	"Dub Styles" (featuring The Lingalong Tecknishun)	Lord Gosh	2:40
9.	"Trim Body"	Lord Gosh	3:35
10.	"Artical"	Lord Gosh	3:21
11.	"Hol' It Up" (featuring Riddla)	Lord Gosh	2:48
12.	"Stone the Crows"	Hylton Smythe	3:21
13.	"Sinny Sin Sins"	Hylton Smythe	3:36
14.	"Evil Rabbit"	Hylton Smythe	3:24
15.	"Swords in the Dirt" (featuring Niara, Danny Vicious, Rodney P, Blackitude, Big P, and Skeme)	Wayne Bennett	4:40
16.	"Highest Grade" (featuring Seanie T)	Lord Gosh	4:05
17.	"Dreamy Days"	Skillamanjaro	4:45

== Charts ==
Chart	Peak position
UK Albums (OCC)	33

== Certifications ==
Certifications for Run Come Save Me
Region	Certification	Certified units/sales
United Kingdom (BPI)	Gold	100,000^{^}
^{^} Shipments figures based on certification alone.
