= One Good Thing =

Studio album by Lou Rhodes
- Released: 2010
- Genre: Folk
- Label: Motion Audio
- Producer: Lou Rhodes, Andy Barlow

Lou Rhodes chronology
Bloom (2007)	One Good Thing (2010)

One Good Thing it the third solo album released by English singer-songwriter Lou Rhodes. It was released in early 2010, following a reunion tour of Rhodes with her previous band Lamb.

== History ==
The album was written and recorded during Lou Rhodes' 2009 reunion tour with her previous band Lamb. The album was the first recorded collaboration since 2004 between Rhodes and her former band co-member, Andy Barlow, who also co-produced the album. The album has been described as "incredibly intimate, introspective and emotional". Another reviewer describes the album as "Rhodes essentially pick(ing) up where her 2007 album, Bloom, left off, using guitar and strings elegantly but sparingly, to underscore excerpts from her diary of the past three years." The song "Janey" refers to the death of her sister.

== Track listing ==
All songs written by Lou Rhodes.

No.	Title	Length
1.	"One Good Thing"	3:37
2.	"There For the Taking"	3:45
3.	"The More I Run"	2:39
4.	"It All"	4:09
5.	"Janey"	3:35
6.	"Circles"	3:28
7.	"Magic Day"	3:27
8.	"The Ocean"	5:34
9.	"Melancholy Me"	3:25
10.	"Baby"	2:31
11.	"Why Wait For Heaven"	4:05

== Credits ==
=== Musicians ===
- Andy Barlow – drums, bass, Fender Rhodes
- Stephen Junior – guitar, slide guitar
- Danny Keane – cello
- Stella Page – violin
- Antonia Pagulatos – string arrangements, violin
- Michael Pagulatos – string arrangements, viola
- Lou Rhodes – drums, bass, guitar, tambourine, vocals
- Jon Thorne – double bass

=== Other ===
- Andy Barlow – engineer, mixing, producer, recording
- Craig Besant – photography
- Gordon Biggins – management
- John Davis – mastering
- Dilip Harris – production input
- Desmond Lambert – recording
- Rebecca Millar – photography
- Lou Rhodes – composer, photography, producer
