= Groovera =

- Broadcast area: Internet radio

Programming
- Format: Chill-out
- Affiliations: Independent

History
- First air date: 2003

Groovera (or Groovera New Modern Radio) was an independent, high quality multi-channel, commercial-free, listener-supported, freemium web-based radio station dedicated to "chill-out music". Non-stop smooth ultra-modern music 24/7. Groovera was founded in 2005 by Timothy James Quigley (July 30, 1970 - July 16, 2020), widely known as Tommy Ohmz, in his Seattle, Washington, living room initially as FrostByte Groove Lounge introducing three channels: flagship channel Jet City Lounge an elegant mix of fine mid-tempo chill-out music, Audio Popsicle a tasty swirl of chilled pop music and Low Mercury a deep mix of mellow chilled electronica. Specifically, Groovera featured mixes of downtempo, future lounge, nu-jazz, vaporwave, ambient pop, trip hop, psybient and neo-soul, as well as other related and contributing genres. Groovera went offline temporarily in May 2012 then announced on Facebook on June 19, 2012 that Groovera had resumed operation introducing three new channels: Exotic Lounge chill for sun chasing world travelers, Chill Surreal the dreamy, tinted side of chill-out music and Soul Nouveau chilled neo-soul from around the globe. Groovera introduced the VIP Lounge in March 2016 as a way to reward Groovera's contributors and supporters. Groovera New Modern Radio came to an official halt on the eve of what would have been the founder and general manager Tommy Ohmz's 50th birthday, July 29, 2020, 12:08:13 pm. Tommy Ohmz was in the process of renewing the Groovera Trademark with his California-based attorney at the time of his untimely passing. As of February 2021, the Groovera web site is listed as "under construction". Groovera is no longer in operation. Groovera. New Radio. Cool Modern Grooves. True.

== History ==
Groovera, originally known as "OverXposure.FM", began in Seattle on August 23, 2003, as a web radio stream called FrostByte Groove Lounge. OverXposure.FM underwent brand transition in September 2006 and became Groovera (pronounced "groov-AIR-ah"), a portmanteau combining the words "groove" and the Latin word vera meaning "true" or "pure". As part of the brand transition, the FrostByte Groove Lounge name was retired and the channel rotation divided into the currently existing channels Jet City Lounge and Low Mercury. The foundations of Ambient Popsicle and forthcoming channel Jazz ala Mode were extracted from the FrostByte Groove Lounge rotation in April 2004. Groovera radio channels first appeared on iTunes Radio in February 2007. Groovera appears to have ceased operations by February 2021.

== Groovera music channels ==
Groovera features six distinct chillout-only music channels designed to appeal to different styles of "chill-out music":

- Jet City Lounge: A mix of instrumental lounge, downtempo, nu-jazz, and brokenbeat, with intermittent vocals. This is the channel that was previously known as FrostByte Groove Lounge.
- Audio Popsicle (formerly Ambient Popsicle): A mix of alternative pop, lounge, vocal downtempo, nu-jazz, ambient pop, trip hop, neo soul, synthpop and deep house.
- Low Mercury: A mix of instrumental downtempo, chill-out, psybient, illbient, ambient dub, ambient techno, nu-jazz, and IDM, featuring the occasional select vocal track. Formerly the evening rotation of FrostByte Groove Lounge.
- Chill Surreal: The dreamy, trippy, shadowy side of vocal lounge music (dream pop, trip hop, ethereal pop, alternative adult contemporary & chilled gothic pop)
- Soul Nouveau: European-styled neo-soul, funky lounge and nu-jazz
- Exotic Lounge: Music for sun-chasing world travelers
