= Speech Debelle =

British rapper (born 1983)

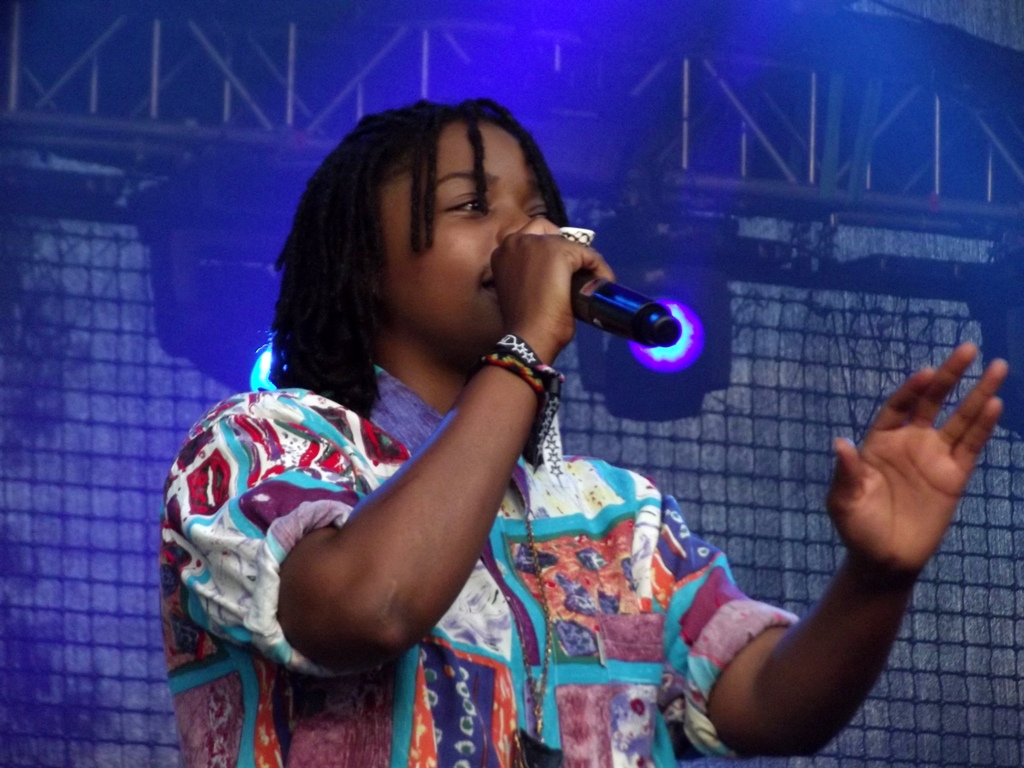
- Debelle performing in 2012

Background information
- Born: Corynne Elliot; 17 March 1983 (age 43)
- Origin: London, England
- Genre: Hip hop
- Occupations: Rapper; singer; songwriter
- Instruments: Vocals
- Years active: 2008–present
- Label: Big Dada
- Website: speechdebelle.com

Corynne Elliot (born 17 March 1983), better known as Speech Debelle, is a British rapper formerly signed to the Big Dada record label. She was the winner of the 2009 Mercury Prize for her debut album Speech Therapy.

Debelle's single from Speech Therapy, "Spinnin" has been re-worked by Tinchy Stryder and Dionne Bromfield and was used as one of the official anthems of the 2012 Summer Olympics in London.

She has also been politically and socially active with a number of charities and movements, and hosted the BBC documentary Hidden Homeless in 2012.

== Early life ==
Corynne Elliot was born in 1983 in London, England, and was raised by her mother in a middle-class Jamaican household in London. She attended Harris City Academy in Croydon and at age 9 began writing poetry. While she wanted to be a singer, she disliked her singing voice when younger, so decided to try rapping at age 13 and at age 16 writing became an emotional outlet for her. Debelle drew inspiration from Michael Jackson and in particular the song "Human Nature", as well as Blackstreet, Mary J. Blige, TLC and reggae music. She left home after arguing with her mother at the age of 19, and for three years Debelle lived in London in either homeless hostels or with friends. While estranged from her mother at the time, she has said she did keep in regular contact. Now reconciled with her mother, Speech cites these years as formative in developing her ambition and material.

== Speech Therapy (2009) ==
Debelle returned to her mother's house at age 23 and began calling record labels. In November 2007 she was signed by Big Dada records, a small imprint of Ninja Tune. She has said the label helped her develop artistically, and gave her complete creative control of her music. Debelle's debut album, Speech Therapy, was released in the United Kingdom on 31 May 2009. The album was led by a white label limited release of "Searching". Thereafter the album had three singles released, "The Key", "Better Days" featuring Micachu, "Go Then, Bye" and finally "Spinning". Recorded mostly in Australia, the album was created by Debelle, Wayne Lotek and Plutonic Lab (who produced "The Key and "Better Days"), and Big Dada founder Will Ashon, the album documented her formative years in London. She has cited her biggest influences on the album as he biggest inspiration for the first album was Tracy Chapman and Meshell Ndegeocello. Unlike many other hip hop albums, the tracks eschew the use of samples and rely instead on live instrumentals.

"The Key" won Best Budget Video for Pop, Dance, Urban at the UK Music Video Awards in 2009.

In 2009, she performed at Glastonbury Festival. Her 2009 Glastonbury appearance was also accompanied with her first live TV performance of "Searching". As the broadcast was made the day after Michael Jackson died, after the song she gave her sentiments to a formative figure to her artistry. Later in the year during an interview with The Guardian, when asked what/who she could bring back to life, she answered Michael Jackson.

Debelle's single from the Speech Therapy, "Spinnin" has been re-worked by Tinchy Stryder and Dionne Bromfield and will be used as one of the official anthems of the 2012 Summer Olympics in London. In March 2011 she performed three songs from the album for Canal Street TV in France.

=== Mercury Prize ===
Speech Therapy won the 2009 Mercury Music Award and was reported as being an upset to more well-known competitors such as Florence and the Machine and Kasabian. After the win, sales of Speech Therapy were comparatively low to other Mercury winners with reported total sales by 2012 of being 15,000 copies. The album peaked on the UK Albums Chart at 65. Debelle criticised the Big Dada record label for indequately marketing the album and was reported to have dropped them. Nevertheless Debelle reunited with them in 2011 to work on her second album entitled Freedom of Speech.

=== Reception ===
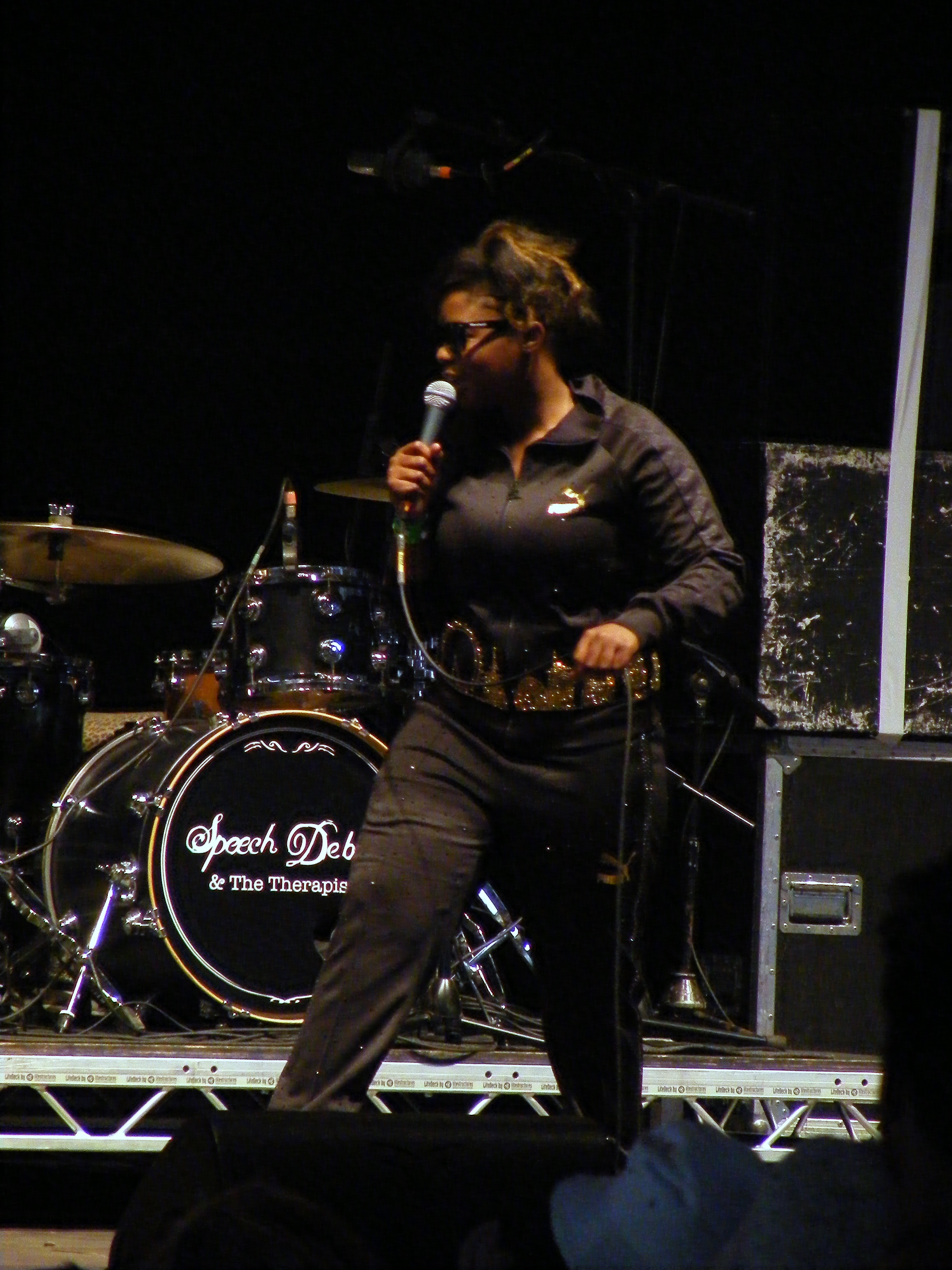
Debelle playing at the Bestival Festival 2009

OHM Monthly cited Speech's work as "biggest thing in UK hip-hop for many a long year". The Times praised the production of the album and named it the 76th best album of the 2000s.

In the US, Pitchfork gave a favourable review and praising her relaxed, conversational delivery. According to Pitchfork, "Some hip-hop fans will likely write her off because the usual American rap signifiers-- samples, seething synths, bombastic beats, and buckets of braggadocio-- play scant part in her artistic agenda."

In a review of the album, The Guardian said "Debelle's songs are vulnerable, open, unafraid. The overall sound...is full of light and air, acoustic guitars and pianos. There is a gracious, almost stately air to the record, yet the songs still sound entirely joyous." Paul Macinnes of The Guardian wrote "There's something intriguing about Speech Debelle, with a voice both husky and sweet, and a back story that's emotive if unclear." Macinnes also nominated Speech Therapy as his favourite album of 2009.

== Musical collaborations ==
In March 2010 Speech Debelle teamed up with Bonobo to co-write and sing on the song "Sun Will Rise", taken from Ninja Tune's 'XX' Boxset.

In August 2011, Speech gave away a new track, "Blaze Up A Fire", via her SoundCloud page. The track features Roots Manuva and Realism. The track deals with uprising events in countries including Egypt and Libya, but Debelle has stated the song has even more pertinence to the 2011 England riots.

== Freedom of Speech (2012) ==
In February 2012, Debelle released her follow-up album, Freedom of Speech, via Big Dada Recordings. It featured the aforementioned "Blaze Up a Fire" as well as lead single "Studio Backpack Rap."

MTV gave the album 5/5 stars with AllMusic in a review (4/5 stars) stating "Speech Debelle is now the most interesting and possibly the most exciting British MC on the scene." The album has garnered mixed reactions from the BBC, who concluded that "anyone who wasn't convinced by her debut is going to find far more to take issue with", and the Independent rating the album 3/5.

== Later music ==
Debelle release her third album entitled Tantil Before I Breathe in 2017 and her fourth album called Sunday Dinner On A Monday in 2023 (both self-released).

== Social and political activism ==
In August 2009, Debelle performed at Africa Express in Paris, an event set up by Blur and Gorillaz front-man Damon Albarn.

In 2009, Debelle appeared alongside Gary Barlow, David Arnold and Jimmy Carr for a CARE charity concert in aid of youth education. She was also invited to 10 Downing Street to celebrate "British Talent", in association with the Talent and Enterprise Taskforce.

In 2010, she was a guest speaker at the Progressive London conference alongside Ken Livingstone, Sadiq Khan MP, and other notable academics. The annual conference explores and discusses the application of liberal politics to the benefit of London. She joined with the National Union of Students to Support Ken Livingstone's "save EMA" pledge.

Her liberal stance on ethnic diversity was also lent to the Hope Not Hate campaign. Debelle also teamed up with Saatchi & Saatchi on the User Voice campaign, giving disadvantaged youth a platform in Parliament.

In early 2011 Debelle took part in a photography project set up by Oxfam and photographer Martin Parr, which help spread awareness about climate change.

She began teaming up with Chuka Umunna the MP for Streatham on her community work to speak about the importance of voting. She has also volunteered with Barnardo's to promote youth inclusion through a project to deliver an alternate Christmas Day video message to their elders on YouTube, as well as writing about gender equality for the VSO Godmothers blog. On 4 October 2011 Debelle was part of the Young Voter's Question Time panel during the Conservative Party Conference in Salford.

She hosted a BBC documentary about homeless youth called Hidden Homeless in 2012. She has been a patron of HOPE Not Hate.

In 2013 Debelle curated The Strength and Vulnerability Bunker, an exhibition at the Southbank Centre, London, presented by the Koestler Trust who exhibit art works by prisoners, detainees and ex-offenders. In 2015 she co-curated Re:Form, also presented by the same trust. This time her co-curators were Jeremy Deller, Carol Ann Duffy and Hot Chip and the category theme was 'journey'.

== Employment tribunal case with Arts Council England ==
In January 2025, it was reported that Debelle had been ordered by an employment tribunal to pay £9,870 in costs to Arts Council England after losing a discrimination case deemed "vexatious and unreasonable."

== Discography ==
Studio albums

Year	Album details
2009	Speech Therapy: Released: 1 June 2009; Label: Big Dada; Formats: 2LP, CD, Digital download
2012	Freedom of Speech: Released: 13 February 2012; Label: Big Dada; Formats: 2LP, CD, Digital download
2017	tantil before i breathe: Released: 17 March 2017; Label: Self-released; Formats: Digital download
2023	Sunday Dinner On A Monday: Released: 9 June 2023; Label: Monday Sessions Records (self); Formats: 2LP, CD
