= Lou Rhodes =

English musician

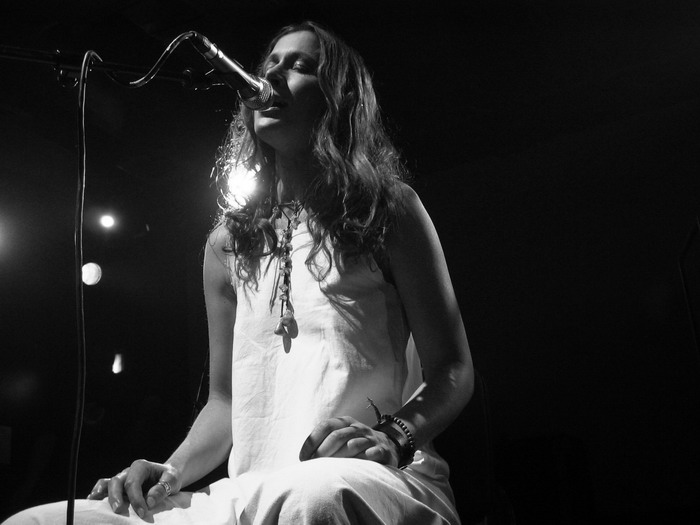
- Rhodes in 2006

Background information
- Born: Louise Ann Rhodes
- Origin: Manchester, England
- Genres: Acoustic, folk, experimental
- Occupation: Singer-songwriter
- Instruments: Vocals, guitar, cello
- Years active: 1994–present
- Labels: Infinite Bloom; A&G Records; Ninjatune Records
- Member of: Lamb; Kiiōtō

Lou Rhodes is an English singer and songwriter from Manchester, now living in Wiltshire. In addition to providing vocals and lyrics for the band Lamb, Rhodes has released four solo albums: Beloved One, Bloom and One Good Thing and theyesandeye. Rhodes has collaborated with 808 State, A Guy Called Gerald, Funkstörung, Pale 3, Sugizo, Plump DJs, Sheila Chandra, Eliza Carthy, Art of Noise, and The Cinematic Orchestra on Ma Fleur and the soundtrack to The Crimson Wing: Mystery of the Flamingos.

In 2023, Rhodes formed new project Kiiōtō with Rohan Heath. The band's debut album, As Dust We Rise, was released in July 2024 on Nude Records.

== Career ==
Originally from Manchester, Rhodes was born to a folk-singer mother, Annie Burton. She grew up around the English folk scene and worked as a photographer in the early 1990s. Rhodes met sound engineer Andy Barlow through a friend and recorded a demo tape together, forming the band Lamb. It resulted in a six-album deal with Mercury Records in 1995. In 2004, Rhodes and Lamb collaborator Barlow split and both began to pursue solo ventures.

Rhodes started her own record label, Infinite Bloom, at the beginning of 2006, to issue her debut solo album Beloved One, which was shortlisted for the Nationwide Mercury Music Prize the same year. This album explored the folk side of Rhodes's music, which was previously undisplayed while performing in Lamb, although songs such as "Fortress" are reminiscent of her times playing in Lamb. She has been described as following a Nick Drake path as a singer-songwriter. In February 2006, she performed together with other female folk singers at the Daughters of Albion event, which was broadcast by BBC 4. Rhodes has performed at Glastonbury Festival a number of times.

In April 2007, her debut was re-released in the US through Cooking Vinyl Records, adding three bonus tracks. Rhodes' second album Bloom was released through A&G Records on 1 September 2007. It featured Emre Ramazanoglu (drums) and Stephen Junior (guitar). On 24 September 2007, she released the first single from Bloom, called "The Rain". In October 2007, Rhodes began a tour to promote the album, however the tour was cut short after the death of her sister.

In 2009, Lamb reunited for a tour. followed by the album 5. in 2010. During this same period, Rhodes recorded her third album, One Good Thing, in the space of two weeks. Largely acoustic, the 11 songs were recorded with the assistance of Barlow at his studio. The album was released in March 2010 and distributed by Ninja Tune.

In anticipation of her fourth album release, Rhodes released the singles "All The Birds" in April, and "All I Need" in June 2016. A month later, the album theyesandeye was released through Nude Records. Part financed through Pledge Music, the 11 songs were co-produced by Simon Byrt. It includes a cover of the song "Angels" originally performed by The xx. Other contributors include Ian Kellet (guitars), Nikolaj Bjerre (drums), Danny Keane (strings) and Tom Moth (harp).

=== Musical style ===
Although Lamb is famous for blending electronica with jazz and elements of drum and bass, Rhodes's solo work is more organic and rooted in folk music. Rhodes expressed a doubt that she will ever return to electronica. She combines finely tuned acoustic guitars—the essence of almost every arrangement—with violin, double bass, and rich percussion. Lyrically, her songs can be described as extremely romantic, soulful and very personal, this is how Rhodes explains the last album's lyrics:

Sometimes I think, "My God, I keep writing all these love songs," and I really struggle with that. I think I'm a bit of an emotional junkie, you know? It seems to be what consumes me. The heart never ceases to provide me with subject matter. I don't know why that is. Someone asked me the other day, "Are you in love with being in love?" And I couldn't really answer that question.

=== Author ===
Lou Rhodes is also a published author. Her children's picture book, The Phlunk (Lou Rhodes/Tori Elliott), published by Strata Books in 2012, received good reviews. Follow-up The Phlunk's Worldwide Symphony appeared in 2015. In 2012, Rhodes also contributed an essay to The First Time I Heard The Smiths, part of an ongoing series where musicians/writers tell their stories of first hearing the music of an iconic artist or band.

=== Collaborations ===
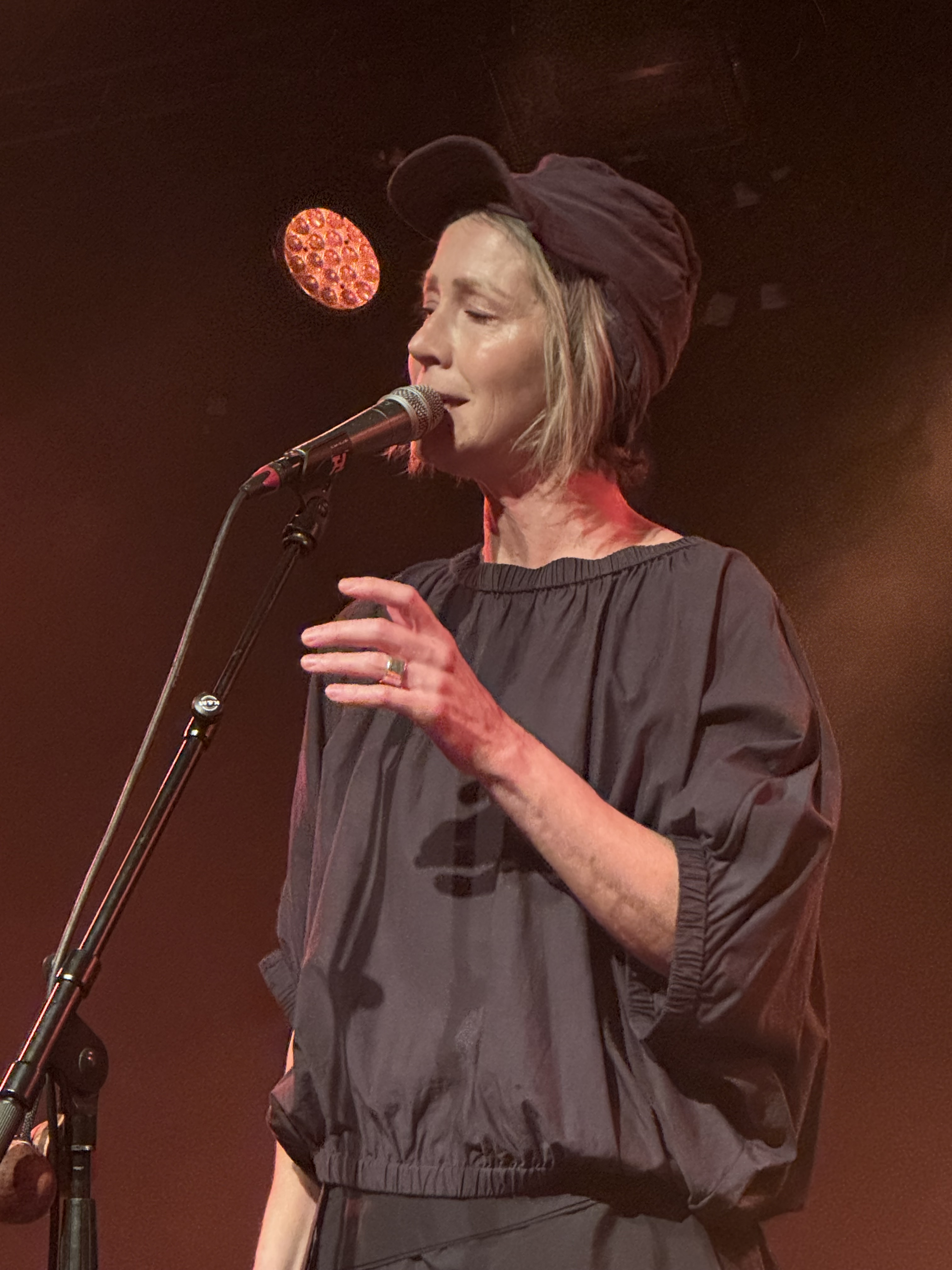
Rhodes performing with Kiiōtō in Amsterdam, the Netherlands in September 2025

Besides her solo work, Rhodes has provided vocals for a number of other artists. In 1996, she featured on the track "Azura" on the 808 State album Don Solaris. Released as a single, it reached no. 79. In 1997, she provided a vocal for the song "Kanon" on the album Truth? by the Japanese guitarist Sugizo. She also co-wrote and featured on the song "Humanity" on the A Guy Called Gerald album Essence, released in 2000. The same year, she also featured on the soundtrack for the film The Princess and the Warrior, performing the song "Escape (Afraid of No One)". In 2004, she featured on the album Disconnected by Funkstörung,

== Personal life ==
Lou Rhodes was married to Crispin Robinson and has two sons. She lives in rural Wiltshire, England.

== Discography ==
=== Albums ===
- 2006: Beloved One (Infinite Bloom Recordings)
- 2007: Bloom (A&G Records)
- 2010: One Good Thing (Motion Audio, distributed by Ninja Tune)
- 2016: theyesandeye (Nude Records) UK number 100

=== Singles ===
- 2006: "Tremble"
- 2007: "The Rain" (A&G Records)
- 2010: "There for the Taking" (Motion Audio)

=== Books ===
- 2013: The Phlunk (ISBN 9780957369016)
- 2014: The Phlunk's Worldwide Symphony (ISBN 9780957369023)
