= The Cinematic Orchestra =

British nu jazz group

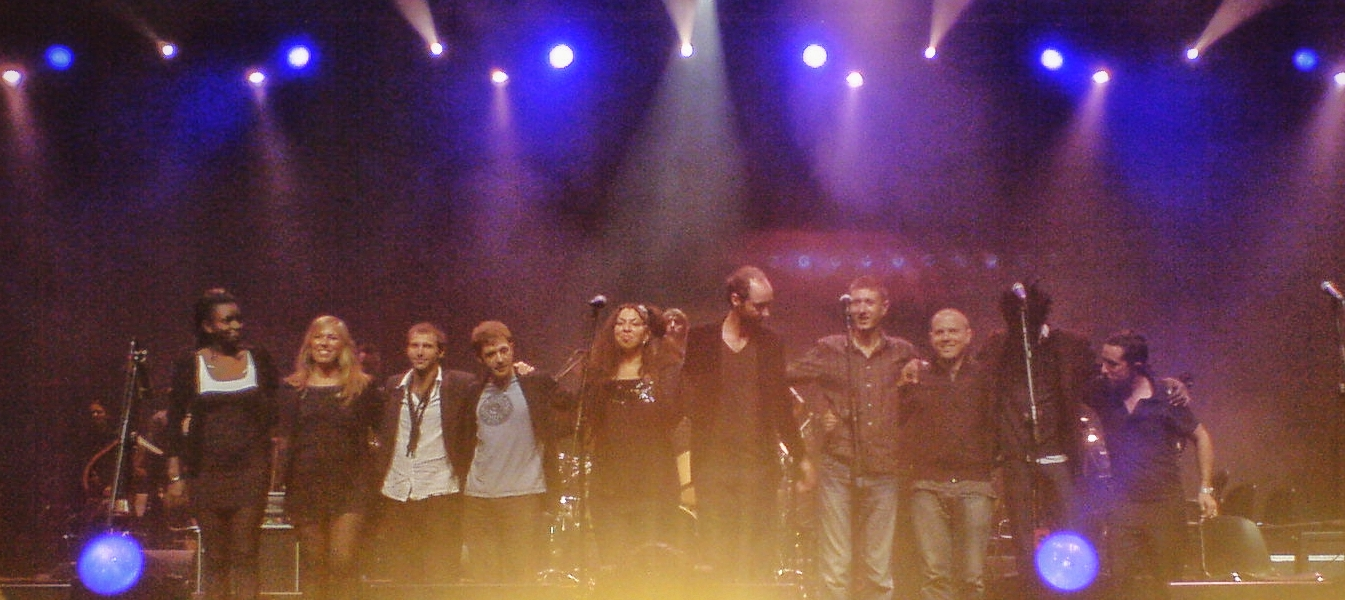
- The Cinematic Orchestra in 2009

Background information
- Origin: London, England
- Genres: Nu jazz; electronic; downtempo; modern classical
- Years active: 1999–present
- Labels: Ninja Tune; Domino
- Members: Jason Swinscoe; Phil France; Luke Flowers; Tom Chant; Nick Ramm; Stuart McCallum
- Past members: Jamie Coleman; T. Daniel Howard; Federico Ughi; Alex James; Patrick Carpenter; Clean Sadness; John Ellis
- Website: cinematicorchestra.com

The Cinematic Orchestra is a British nu jazz and downtempo music group created in 1999 by Jason Swinscoe and later involving his music collaborator Dominic Smith. The group is signed to independent record label Ninja Tune.

The Cinematic Orchestra have produced four studio albums, Motion (1999), Every Day (2002), Ma Fleur (2007) and To Believe (2019), and two film soundtrack albums, Man with a Movie Camera (2003) and The Crimson Wing: Mystery of the Flamingos (2009).

In addition to Swinscoe, the band includes former DJ Food member PC (Patrick Carpenter) on turntables, Luke Flowers on drums, Tom Chant on saxophone, Nick Ramm on piano, Stuart McCallum on guitar, Phil France on double bass. Former members include Jamie Coleman (trumpet), T. Daniel Howard (drums), Federico Ughi (drums), Alex James (piano), and Clean Sadness (synthesizer, programming). Heidi Vogel (vocals) appears as a regular collaborator.

Swinscoe and Carpenter have also recorded together under the band name Neptune.

== Style ==
The Cinematic Orchestra's sound, in both live and studio contexts, employs a live band which improvises along with a turntablist and electronic elements such as samples provided by Swinscoe. In their studio releases Swinscoe will often remix the live source material to produce a combination of live jazz improvisation with electronica, such that it is difficult to tell where the improvisation ends and the production begins.

== History ==
Swinscoe first formed a group called Crabladder in 1990, whilst studying Fine Art at Cardiff College, releasing one official single on his own Power Tools label.

The Cinematic Orchestra's debut album, Motion, was released in 1999. The critical success of that album led to them being asked to perform at the Director's Guild Awards ceremony for the presentation of the Lifetime Achievement Award to film director Stanley Kubrick.

The band were asked by the organisers of the Porto European City of Culture 2001 festival to write a new score to Dziga Vertov's classic 1929 Soviet Union film Man with a Movie Camera, to be performed live in accompaniment with a showing of the silent film. The work differed from the band's usual compositions due to its live performance, ruling out the post production work that was present on Motion. The Cinematic Orchestra toured the work and later released it as an album. Many of the compositions originally created for that album, Man with a Movie Camera, were later adapted from live form (adding in vocal tracks and electronic elements, among other changes) for their next album, Every Day. It reached #54 in the UK Albums Chart in May 2002.

In 2006, the band contributed a cover of Radiohead's "Exit Music (For a Film)" for the Radiohead tribute album Exit Music: Songs with Radio Heads as its title track and closing track. In this piece the band slowed down the tempo of the original, divided the timbre into four sections beginning with saxophone, to the classical guitar, to the electric guitar, ending the piece with the same simple acoustic guitar rhythm as the original.

The Cinematic Orchestra released the album Ma Fleur in May 2007. Several songs feature Patrick Watson, Fontella Bass, or Lou Rhodes on vocals, with Rhodes and Watson sharing vocals on one song.

The Cinematic Orchestra recorded the soundtrack to the Disneynature film The Crimson Wing: Mystery of the Flamingos, released in France in December 2008 (originally as Les ailes pourpres: Le mystère des flamants). The score was produced by the band and Steve McLaughlin. The score was performed live with the London Metropolitan Orchestra at Union Chapel, Islington in September 2009 and won the award for Best Original Score for a Documentary Film at the Jackson Hole Wildlife Film Festival in Wyoming, USA in October 2009.

Ninja Tune invited the Cinematic Orchestra to perform at the twentieth anniversary gala performance of the label at the Royal Albert Hall in November 2010.

In 2011, the Cinematic Orchestra commissioned a series of compositions for avant-garde short films that were performed at the Barbican Centre under the auspices of its curating a series entitled "In Motion" (also featuring Dorian Concept with saxophonist Tom Chant, Grey Reverend, and Austin Peralta). It subsequently released the album In Motion #1 in 2012.

In 2015, they created their own version of Melanie De Biasio's track "I'm Gonna Leave You" for the album Gilles Peterson presents - No Deal Remixed.

Their fourth studio album, To Believe, was released in March 2019.

== Song appearances ==
"To Build a Home", from the album Ma Fleur and featuring the vocals of the Canadian singer-songwriter Patrick Watson, has been used extensively in film and television. In 2008, the song was used for the Chivas Regal Live with Chivalry advertisement. It has also been featured in the films Trinidad, The Tree, Polytechnique, and the 2011 shorts Rapha Continental and This Is Brighton.

It was also featured in August 2013 for an extended trailer of the upcoming third series of Homeland on Showtime. It appeared in the 2009 documentary Ingredients: Who's Your Farmer? about the local food movement. The song's slow, melancholy melody provided an easy, smooth transition from the first half of the documentary to the next. In 2012, the song was used in a video named "The Most Astounding Fact", in which science communicator Neil deGrasse Tyson answers a question posed by a Time magazine reader. The video was edited by freelance videographer Max Schlickenmeyer who posted it to YouTube, where it garnered more than 9 million views. In 2013, the song was used in an advertisement for Guinness featuring wheelchair basketballers.

A shorter version of the song "That Home", with a slightly different composition, has also been used on occasion, such as an episode of Teen Wolf, in an episode of Suits, in the trailer for the 2011 film Another Earth and in the ABC drama Defying Gravity. It also featured in the season seven finale of the FOX dance competition So You Think You Can Dance. It was also featured as one of the dance performance songs in the 2012 film Step Up Revolution.

== Discography ==
=== Studio albums ===
Title	Details	Peak chart positions				Certifications
Title	Details	UK	BEL (Fl)	FRA	SWI	Certifications
Motion	Released: 27 September 1999; Label: Ninja Tune; Format: Digital download, CD	—	—	—	—	
Every Day	Released: 27 April 2002; Label: Ninja Tune; Format: Digital download, CD	54	—	124	—	
Ma Fleur	Released: 7 May 2007; Label: Ninja Tune, Domino; Format: Digital download, CD	44	37	71	94	BPI: Silver
To Believe	Released: 15 March 2019; Label: Ninja Tune, Domino; Format: Digital download, CD	19	24	87	37	
"—" denotes an album that did not chart or was not released.

=== Soundtrack albums ===
Title	Details
Man with a Movie Camera	Released: 26 May 2003; Label: Ninja Tune; Format: Digital download, CD
The Crimson Wing: Mystery of the Flamingos	Released: 26 October 2008; Label: Ninja Tune; Format: Digital download, CD

=== Live albums ===
Title	Details
Live at the Big Chill	Released: August 2007; Label: Ninja Tune; Format: Digital download, CD
Live at the Royal Albert Hall	Released: 14 April 2008; Label: Ninja Tune; Format: Digital download, CD

=== Remix albums ===
Title	Details
Remixes 98–2000	Released: 13 November 2000; Label: Ninja Tune; Format: Digital download, CD

=== Mix albums ===
Title	Details
Late Night Tales: The Cinematic Orchestra	Released: 14 June 2010; Label: Late Night Tales; Format: Digital download, CD

=== Other albums ===
Title	Details
The Cinematic Orchestra presents In Motion #1	Released: 2012; Label: Ninja Tune; Format: Digital download, CD
The Swimmer (Phil France album)	Released: 2013; Label: Ninja Tune; Format: Digital download, CD

=== Singles ===
Title	Year	Peak chart positions	Certifications	Album
Title	Year	FRA	Certifications	Album
"Diabolus"	1999	—		Motion
"Channel 1 Suite" / "Ode to the Big Sea"	1999	—		Motion
"All That You Give" (featuring Fontella Bass)	2002	—		Every Day
"Horizon" (featuring Niara Scarlett)	2002	—		Every Day
"Man with the Movie Camera"	2002	—		Every Day
"To Build a Home" (featuring Patrick Watson)	2007	96	BPI: Platinum; MC: 4× Platinum; RIAA: 2× Platinum	Ma Fleur
"Breathe"	2007	—		Ma Fleur
"Arrival of the Birds"	2008	—		Non-album singles
"Entr'acte"	2011	—		Non-album singles
"Manhatta"	2011	—		Non-album singles
"To Believe" (featuring Moses Sumney)	2016	—		To Believe
"A Caged Bird / Imitations of Life" (featuring Roots Manuva)	2019	—		To Believe
"A Promise" (featuring Heidi Vogel)	2019	—		To Believe
"—" denotes a single that did not chart or was not released.
