= Lyzza =

Brazilian artist and DJ

Lyzza, stylized as LYZZA, is a Brazilian artist, Music Producer and DJ.

== Background ==
As a teenager she enrolled in a DJ workshop class at Amsterdam community-centre Studio Nowhere, which encouraged her to keep pursuing music. In 2016 she started as a Ball Culture DJ in Amsterdam and eventually started touring around the club scene in Europe. As an electronic pop artist, she released four EPs and a mixtape and has been associated with the avant-pop genre as well as "post-PC Music".

Lyzza has cemented her presence in the avant-garde music world and her career has taken her across high-profile festivals such as Sonar, Melt!, Pukkelpop, Montreux Jazz Festival and Primavera Sound, the last performance resulting in Pitchfork recognising her as one of the “Best of Primavera Sound 2018.” Lyzza has produced music for Emel Mathlouthi and has made remixes for Linn Da Quebrada and American musician John Frusciante/ Trickfinger his experimental electronic label Evar Records.

Lyzza has cited Nicki Minaj's Pink Friday: Roman Reloaded (2012) as an influence, explaining how "Roman Reloaded taught me you don’t have to censor yourself, there’s not that many rules to the artistic creation of music." Lyzza has stated that she found her SoundCloud community with Ariel Zetina, Jasmine Infiniti, LSDXOXO, among others.

In 2022, Lyzza released her mixtape Mosquito on the label Big Dada, an imprint of Ninja Tune. The mixtape featured a collaboration with Spanish artist La Zowi. and Zambian - Canadian rapper and producer and 2020 Polaris Music Prize-winner Backxwash

Since 2023, Lyzza has expanded her artistry and debuted her first gallery-exhibited soundpiece 'Echo's' at The Serpentine Gallery as part of 'Third World:The Bottom Dimension', a multi-part project, exhibition and free-for-all PC Video Game conceptualised by artist and collaborator Gabriel Massan. Gabriel was the youngest artist to have their own solo-exhibition and Lyzza was the youngest artists ever showcased at the gallery, earning them a collaborative cover for Fact Magazine's S/S 2023 Issue.
