= Roots Manuva =

British rapper and producer (born 1972)

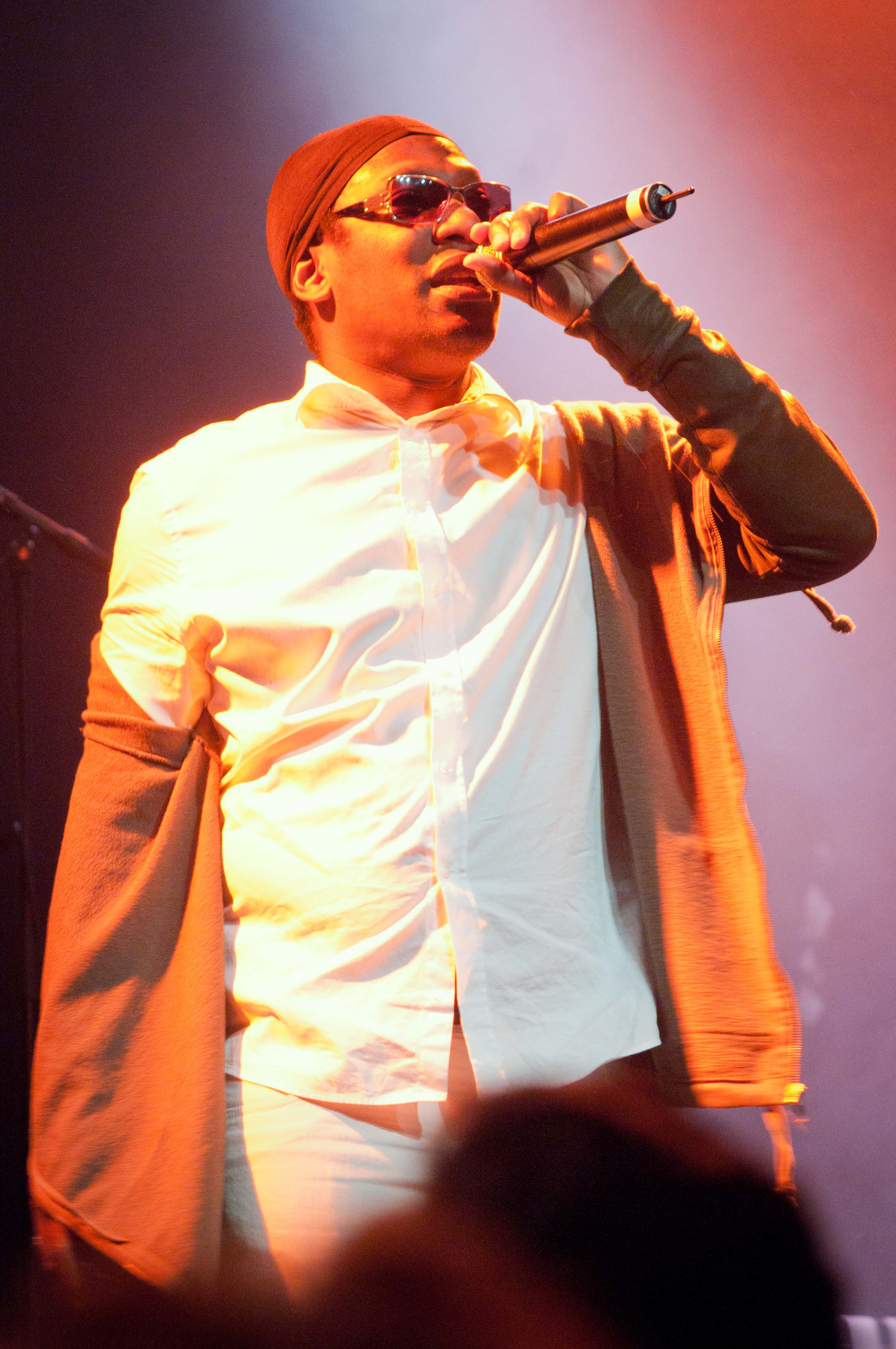
- Roots Manuva performing at a concert in Auckland in 2012.

Background information
- Also known as: Lord Gosh; Hylton Smythe; Rodrick Manuva; Brigadier Smythe; Cecil P.Y.L.M.; Pim Pimpernel; Chubb
- Born: Rodney Smith; 9 September 1972 (age 54)
- Origin: Stockwell, London
- Genres: Alternative hip-hop; trip hop; dub; electronic
- Occupations: Vocalist; rapper; producer; remixer
- Instrument: Vocals
- Years active: 1994–2018; 2021–present (active); 2018–2021 (hiatus)
- Labels: Big Dada; Banana Klan
- Website: rootsmanuva.co.uk

Rodney Hylton Smith (born 9 September 1972), better known by his stage name Roots Manuva, is a British rapper and producer. Since his debut in 1994, he has produced numerous albums and singles on the label Big Dada, achieving commercial success with albums Run Come Save Me and Slime & Reason. He has been described as "one of the most influential artists in British music history." His most recent studio album, Bleeds, was released in October 2015.

== Biography ==
Smith grew up around Stockwell, London, England. His parents were from a small village in Jamaica where his father was a preacher and tailor. He spent much of his early life in poverty and this and his strict Pentecostal upbringing had an influence on his music as can be heard in many of his tracks such as "Sinny Sin Sins" and "Colossal Insight".

Of his early discovery of music he says:

It was as a kid. Before I even knew what a sound system was. I was walking past Stockwell skateboard park and there was this sound being set up. They were probably just trying out their speakers. I was with my mum, holding my mum's hand. And I remember my mum being quite intimidated by the whole affair. Such a barrage of bass coming from it! And these dodgy-looking blokes standing beside it just admiring the sound of their bass. It's just a bass thing. A volume thing. I don't know if I rose-tint the memories, but I remember it sounded so good, so rich. It's not like today when we go to clubs and it hurts. It was more of a life-giving bass.

Smith made his recorded debut in 1994 as part of IQ Procedure through Suburban Base's short-lived hip-hop imprint Bluntly Speaking Vinyl. He debuted as Roots Manuva the same year on Blak Twang's "Queen's Head" single, before releasing his own single, "Next Type of Motion" the following year through the same label, the Sound of Money. 1996 saw the release of his collaborations with Skitz ("Where My Mind Is At"/"Blessed Be The Manner") on 23 Skidoo's Ronin label. The release of "Feva" on Tony Vegas' Wayward imprint followed in 1997. This was also the year that saw the first releases from Big Dada, a collaboration between Coldcut's Ninja Tune label and hip-hop journalist Will Ashon.

Released for Coldcut's renowned experimental/hip-hop label Ninja Tune in 1998, some of his music may be seen as a predecessor of grime. The following year he released his debut album, Brand New Second Hand. A reference to his family's modest lifestyle, the title is a phrase his mother used for presents he got as a youngster that were pre-used. The single "Witness (1 Hope)", from his second album Run Come Save Me, with its lyrical flow and heavy shuffling squelch bass (allegedly a result of Smith trying to copy the Doctor Who theme) is a UK rap anthem. He had such an impact on the UK rap scene that The Times said that "his is the voice of urban Britain, encompassing dub, ragga, funk and hip-hop as it sweeps from crumbling street corners to ganja-filled dancehalls, setting gritty narratives against all manner of warped beats." Manuva was rewarded for his breakthrough with a MOBO as Best Hip Hop Act that year.

== Hiatus ==
In 2018, Manuva was hospitalised for six months due to suffering from a subdural hematoma. The brain injury left him with memory loss and reduced mobility in his left leg.

== Discography ==
=== Studio albums ===
List of studio albums, with selected chart positions and certifications
Title	Album details	Peak chart positions				Certifications
Title	Album details	UK	FRA	IRL	NOR	Certifications
Brand New Second Hand	Released: 22 March 1999; Label: Big Dada; Formats: CD, LP	167	—	—	—	BPI: Silver
Run Come Save Me	Released: 13 August 2001; Label: Big Dada; Formats: CD, LP	33	140	—	—	BPI: Gold
Dub Come Save Me	Released: 8 July 2002; Label: Big Dada; Formats: CD, LP, digital download	75	—	—	—	
Awfully Deep	Released: 28 January 2005; Label: Big Dada; Formats: CD, LP, digital download	24	110	30	31	
Alternately Deep	Released: 13 March 2006; Label: Big Dada; Formats: CD, LP, digital download	139	—	—	—	
Slime & Reason	Released: 25 August 2008; Label: Big Dada; Formats: CD, LP, digital download	22	127	48	—	
Duppy Writer	Released: 6 September 2010; Label: Big Dada; Formats: CD, LP, digital download	109	—	—	—	
4everevolution	Released: 3 October 2011; Label: Big Dada; Formats: CD, LP, digital download	59	—	—	—	
Bleeds	Released: 30 October 2015; Label: Big Dada; Formats: CD, LP, digital download	51	—	—	—	
"—" denotes a recording that did not chart or was not released in that territory.

=== EPs ===
- Next Type of Motion (1995)
- Awfully De/EP (24 October 2005)
- Banana Skank EP (21 January 2013)
- "Stolen Youth EP" (6 August 2013)

=== Live albums ===
- Live from London (iTunes) (15 August 2008)

=== Singles ===
- "Juggle Tings Proper" (22 February 1999)
- "Motion 5000" (5 July 1999)
- "Witness (1 Hope)" (23 July 2001) UK No. 45
- "Dreamy Days" (8 October 2001) UK No. 53
- "Yellow Submarine" (14 October 2002)
- "Colossal Insight" (17 January 2005) UK No. 33
- "Too Cold" (21 March 2005) UK No. 39
- "Buff Nuff" (30 June 2008)
- "Again & Again" (25 August 2008) – featured on the EA TRAX soundtrack for the EA Sports videogame Fight Night Round 4
- "Let the Spirit" (27 October 2008)
- "Do Nah Bodda Mi" (29 June 2009)
- "It's On (Banana Klan)" (28 April 2011)
- "Here We Go Again (feat. Spikey Tee)" (3 October 2011)
- "Don't Breathe Out" (22 September 2015)

=== Guest appearances ===
- Amon Tobin – "Saboteur mix," also known as "Saboteur -- Roots Manuva version" (from Ninja Tune compilation Xen Cuts)
- Antipop Consortium - "NY to Tokyo" (from Fluorescent Black)
- Audio Bullys – "Made Like That" (feat. Roots Manuva & Mr Fox) (from Generation)
- Blak Twang – "Queen's Head" (from Dettwork S.E. promo); "Shhhoosh" (from 19 Long Time)
- Breakage – "Run 'Em Out"
- The Cinematic Orchestra – "All Things to All Men" (from Every Day); "A Caged Bird / Imitations of Life" (from To Believe)
- Cornish Waters – "Look to Myself for Faith" (from UK Hustlerz – The Return, under the pseudonym Brigadier Smythe)
- Coldcut – "True Skool" (from Sound Mirrors) UK No. 61, "Only Heaven" (from Only Heaven EP)
- DJ Mentat – "Rugged Wid' It" (with Seanie T)
- DJ Shadow – "GDMFSOB (UNKLE Uncensored mix)" (from "Mashin' on the Motorway")
- DJ Skitz – "Inner City Folk" and "Fingerprints of the Gods" (from Countryman)
- Dobie – "Connectivity" (from The Sound of One Hand Clapping)
- Freq Nasty – "Boomba Clatt" (from Bring Me the Head of Freq Nasty)
- Fun Lovin' Criminals – "Keep on Yellin'" (from Classic Fantastic)
- Gorillaz – "All Alone" (from Demon Days alongside Martina Topley-Bird)
- The Herbaliser – "Lord Lord" (from Take London); "Starlight" (from Very Mercenary)
- INORAN – "Rat Race" (from Sou)
- Jamie Cullum – "Love for $ale" (from "Momentum")
- Jungle – "You Ain't No Celebrity" (from "Volcano")
- King Kooba – "Barefoot" (from Indian Summer)
- Killa Kela – "Here Comes The Submarines feat. Roots Manuva" (from Elocution)
- Leftfield – "Dusted" (from Rhythm and Stealth) UK No. 28
- Lotek HiFi – "Move Ya Ting" (from Mixed Blessings)
- The Maccabees – "Empty Vessels"
- Massive Attack - "Dead Editors" (from Ritual Spirit EP)
- Morcheeba – "Blaze Away" (from Blaze Away)
- Mr. Scruff – "Jus Jus" (from Keep It Unreal), "Nice Up The Function" (from Ninja Tuna)
- N'fa – "My Style" (from Cause An Effect)
- New Flesh for Old – "Norbert & Cecil" (from Understanding, under the pseudonym Cecil P.Y.L.M. Pim Pimpernel)
- Reachout – "For Whom the Heart Beats" (from The Bristo Sq. EP)
- Ty – "Oh U Want More?" (from Upwards) UK No. 65 (also "So U Want Morre? (refix)" on Upwards new edition)
- Saian Supa Crew – "Hey Yo My Man"
- Speech Debelle - "Blaze Up a Fire" (from Freedom of Speech)
- Colossus – "Thrupenny Bits" (from "West Oaktown") (OmRecords 2002 – pseudonym Hylton Smythe)
- Nightmares on Wax – "70s 80s (Up Bringing Mix) (feat. Roots Manuva, LSK, Rodney P and Tozz 180)" (from "70s 80s" single)
- The Herbaliser – "Something Wicked (Roots Manuva's Haunted House Dub)" (limited free release from Ninja Tune website to celebrate forthcoming Ninja Tune boxset).
- DELS – "Capsize" (from GOB – 2011)

=== Other ===
- Badmeaningood Vol.2 (7 October 2002) (19 tracks selected by Rodney Smith for the Badmeaningood series.)
- Back to Mine: Roots Manuva (24 October 2005) (18 tracks selected by Smith for the Back to Mine series.)
- The Blacknificent 7 – Riding Thru Da Undaground! (collaboration with Seanie T, Rodney P, Skeme, Est'elle, Karl Hinds, Jeff3)
- Black Whole Styles – "Uranium 235" (with Drunken Imoortals & New Flesh) & "Feel Da Panic"
- Extra Yard: The Bouncement Revolution – "Dreamy Days(Loteck Productions) featuring Ricky Rankin, "Born Again" featuring Wildflower, "Witness The Swords" featuring Fallacy, Rodney P, Blackitude, Big P & Skeme, "Bashment Boogie"
- Sound01: A Big Dada Sampler – "Skiver's Guide" featuring Black Twang & Gamma

== Other information ==
- "Witness (1 Hope)" appeared in the 8th episode of season 2 of Ted Lasso, as psychologist Sharon was biking to her office.
- "Witness (1 Hope)" was played in the UK game show Total Wipeout international special episode.
- "Witness" (1 Hope) was also featured in the 2006 film Children of Men.
- "Awfully Deep" was used as a background track in series 2 of TFI Friday.
- "Witness (1 Hope)" was used as part of the soundtrack for Big Up Production's video of Chris Sharma's ascent of the bouldering problem called "Witness the Fitness" (V15).

== Awards and nominations ==
- 2016: Berlin Music Video Awards, nominated in the Best Director category for 'CRYING'
