= Jason Swinscoe =

British musician

- Born: 1972 (age 53–54)
- Origin: Cardiff, Wales
- Genres: nu jazz, downtempo
- Occupations: musician, DJ, producer
- Instruments: piano, guitar, sampling
- Years active: 1990–present
- Label: Ninja Tune
- Member of: The Cinematic Orchestra

Jason Swinscoe (born January 1972) is a British jazz musician, DJ and producer, founder and leader of The Cinematic Orchestra.

== Biography ==
Swinscoe began learning to play the guitar at the age of six; however, he received no formal musical education. He studied visual arts at the Cardiff School of Art & Design. In 1990, he formed the band Crabladder in Cardiff. In 1994, he became a DJ at Heart FM, a pirate radio station in south London. He then began working at the Ninja Tune label, where he developed an interest in genres such as electronic music, abstract hip-hop, nu jazz, drum and bass, ambient and chillout. In 1999, he founded the group The Cinematic Orchestra, which brought him the greatest recognition. He also performed with the band Neptune.

He lived for several years in Los Angeles, New York and Paris. He is the father of three daughters.
