= Nu jazz =

Musical genre

Nu Jazz
- Stylistic origins: Jazz; acid jazz; jazz fusion; soul; smooth jazz; electronica; free jazz; house; electronic; jazz rap; techno; EDM; dance
- Cultural origins: Early 1990s, United States, United Kingdom, Japan, France, Germany, Norway, Mexico, and Brazil

Other topics
- Electro swing; trip hop

Nu jazz (also spelt nü jazz or known as jazztronica, or future jazz) is a genre of jazz and electronic music. The music blends jazz elements with other musical styles, such as funk, electronic music, and free improvisation.

Nu jazz typically ventures further into the electronic territory than does its close cousin, acid jazz. Nu jazz can be very experimental in nature and can vary widely in sound and concept. The sound departs further from its blues roots than acid jazz does, and instead explores electronic sounds and ethereal jazz sensualities. "The star of Nu jazz is the music itself and not the individual dexterity of the musicians," writes Sunday People.

== History ==
Nu jazz began with the use of electronic instruments in the 1970s, with contributions from artists like Miles Davis, Herbie Hancock, and Ornette Coleman. Herbie Hancock's work in the early 1980s, particularly his collaboration with Bill Laswell on the album Future Shock, played a pivotal role in defining the genre by incorporating electro and hip-hop rhythms. By the late 1980s, many hip-hop musicians were exploring jazz-rap, including groups like Gang Starr, The Roots, A Tribe Called Quest, and Nas. Concurrently, in the 1980s, numerous house musicians drew inspiration from jazz, especially post-bop and jazz-funk.

In the mid-1990s and early 2000s, downtempo artists such as Jazztronik, St Germain, Trüby Trio, DJ Takemura, Perry Hemus, and Jazzanova delved deeper into jazz. During the same period, producers of intelligent dance music, including notable names like Squarepusher and Spring Heel Jack, and later London Elektricity and Landslide, also showed interest in nu jazz. Techno musicians like Carl Craig and his Innerzone Orchestra project demonstrated interest in the genre. Figures from hardcore and breakcore scenes, such as Alec Empire, Nic Endo, and Venetian Snares, experimented with a harsher and more noisy variant of nu jazz. A decade later, some dubstep producers, like Boxcutter, also explored electronic jazz.

While maintaining traditional jazz forms, pianist Bugge Wesseltoft and trumpeter Nils Petter Molvær are known for their improvisations in the nu jazz style. The Cinematic Orchestra is recognized for incorporating traditional jazz elements into their musical productions alongside electronic elements. St Germain, a prominent figure in nu jazz, even sold 1.5 million copies of his album "Tourist."

== See also ==
- Broken beat
- Groovera New Modern Radio
- Saint-Germain-des-Prés Café, popular series of nu-jazz compilations
- Chillout

== Sources ==
- "A Flourish of Jazz", Time Magazine article, including mention of the use of electronics in jazz fusion.
