= Big Dada =

British independent record label

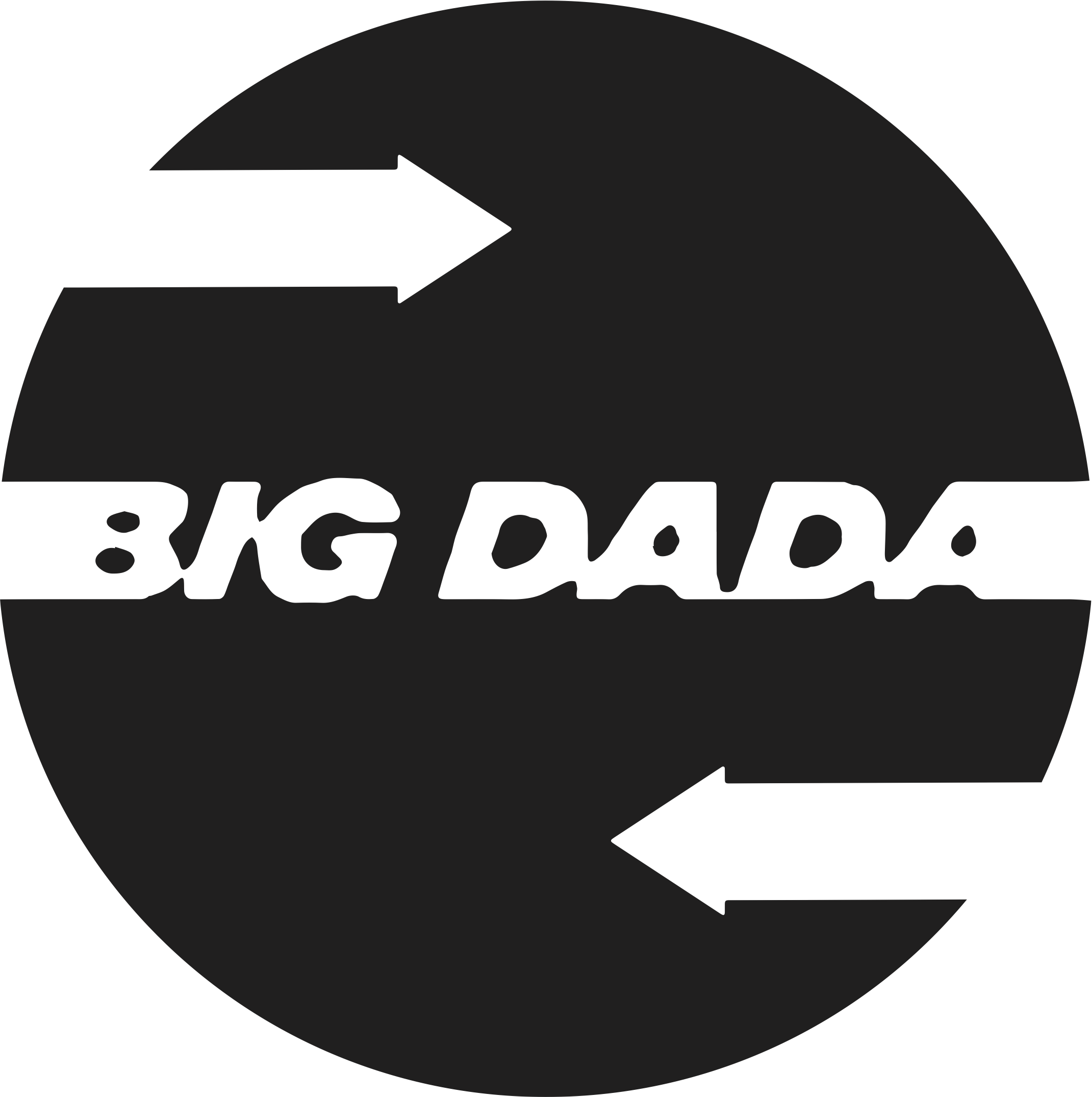
- Founded: 1997; 29 years ago
- Founder: Will Ashon
- Distributor: Ninja Tune
- Genre: Hip-hop, dub, grime, electronic dance music
- Country of origin: United Kingdom
- Location: London
- Official website: bigdada.com

Big Dada is a British independent record label imprint distributed by Ninja Tune. It was started by reputed hip-hop journalist Will Ashon in 1997. It is best known for marketing of prominent British hip-hop artist Roots Manuva, poet and playwright Kae Tempest, grime pioneer Wiley, rapper and designer DELS and Mercury Prize winners Speech Debelle and Young Fathers.

== History ==
Big Dada's first release was Alpha Prhyme's 12-inch single Misanthropic, a collaboration between Luke Vibert and Juice Aleem in 1997. Over the following years, the label has released over one hundred and fifty records and garnered considerable critical acclaim, being described by Observer Music Monthly as "the very best underground hip hop label".

Big Dada's first logo (1997–2012, 2017)

Big Dada's second logo (2013–2016)

In 2007, Big Dada released the compilation Well Deep to celebrate their tenth anniversary. NME said the label was "not only a platform for the British urban underground but also attracts some of the most progressive wordsmiths and beat-scientists in the whole world... Big Dada are still pushing things forward." As the quote suggests, Big Dada is not exclusively a label for British acts. Their roster has also featured contributions from American hip-hop artists including Bigg Jus, Busdriver, and Mike Ladd, as well as French hip-hop group TTC. They also released debut albums by both Diplo and Spank Rock, as well as the comeback album from grime legend Wiley, who was so pleased with the record deal they offered that he recorded "50/50" in tribute.

On 8 September 2009, Speech Debelle won the 2009 Barclaycard Mercury Prize for her debut album Speech Therapy produced by Wayne Lotek. It is the label's third nomination, after Roots Manuva's Run Come Save Me in 2002 and Ty's Upwards in 2003. On 30 October 2014, Young Fathers won the 2014 Barclaycard Mercury Prize for their debut album Dead. It was the label's joint fourth nomination alongside Everybody Down by Kae Tempest and second Mercury Prize winning album.

Roots Manuva, one of the label's best-known artists, signed a new deal with the label in 2011. In the 2007 documentary for the label Well Deep, he said, "It's been a lovely relationship over the years... Big Dada's unique and it will always be unique because it's a philosophy, y'know? It's unique because it dares to stick its neck out and it's run by people who genuinely love music. It's not just a record label, it's a movement."

In 2021 Big Dada relaunched "as a label run by Black, POC & Minority Ethnic people for Black, POC & Minority Ethnic artists."

== Roster (current) ==
- Congo Natty
- Hype Williams
- Lyzza
- Kae Tempest
- King Geedorah (MF Doom)
- Onyx Collective
- Rahill
- PVA
- Roots Manuva
- Sampa the Great
- Two Fingers
- Visionist
- WEN
- Yaya Bey
- Young Fathers

== Roster (alumni) ==
- Anti-Pop Consortium
- Baishe Kings
- Busdriver
- Bang On!
- Cadence Weapon
- Cell Broco
- cLOUDDEAD
- Darq E Freaker
- DELS
- Diplo
- Dobie
- Elan Tamara
- FARAI
- Gamma
- Infesticons
- Infinite Livez
- Wiley
- Jammer
- Juice Aleem
- K-The-I???
- Kai Whiston
- Kail
- Kutmah
- Lotek Hifi
- Majesticons
- New Flesh
- NMS / Bigg Jus / Orko Eloheim
- Offshore
- Paris Suit Yourself
- Part 2
- Roseau
- Run the Jewels (Killer Mike & El-P)
- Samuel
- Spank Rock
- Speech Debelle
- Sticky
- Thavius Beck
- Thunderheist
- Tre Mission
- TTC
- Ty
- Visions
- XRABIT +DMG$

== Compilation discography ==
- Black Whole Styles (1998)
- SOUND01: A Big Dada Sampler (2001)
- Extra Yard: The Bouncement Revolution (2002)
- Well Deep: Ten Years of Big Dada Recordings (2007)

== See also ==
- List of record labels
- List of independent UK record labels
