= Psycho (soundtrack) =

Psycho: Music from and Inspired by the Motion Picture

Soundtrack album by Various Artists
- Released: December 1, 1998
- Genre: Film soundtrack
- Length: 49:26
- Label: Geffen GEFD-25313
- Producer: Brian Grazer, Dave Hernandez, David Simoné (executive producers)

Professional ratings
Review scores
Source	Rating
Entertainment Weekly	(B)
MSNBC	

Psycho: Music from and Inspired by the Motion Picture is the soundtrack album to the 1998 remake of Psycho. The record was released on December 1, 1998 by Geffen Records.

== Background ==
The album includes three adaptations of Bernard Herrmann's score to the original by Danny Elfman. Elfman's adaptation was later released on a separate album. The only released recordings of the original score are new performances by other orchestras, although the 1975 recording was conducted by the composer, Bernard Herrmann. The rest of the album is made up of songs by rock, metal, country, trip hop, and drum and bass artists.

Many of the songs were recorded for the album. Five songs sample the actual film: "Once Is Not Enough" repeats a number of Norman Bates and Marion Crane's lines from the 1998 version, and "Honeymoon Suite", "Madhouse", "All of My Life", and "In the End" all sample Bernard Herrmann's score to the original film.

Two songs are cover versions: "Psycho", written by Leon Payne and here performed by Teddy Thompson, was previously recorded by Elvis Costello and Beasts of Bourbon, and "Psycho Killer", performed here by James Hall, was originally performed by Talking Heads.

Only two of the songs were already released by their respective artists at the time of the album's release: Rob Zombie's "Living Dead Girl" on his album Hellbilly Deluxe, and Girls Against Boys' "Psycho Future" on their album Freak*on*ica (both also Geffen releases).

"Screaming" was later released by Pet Shop Boys as a B-side to their 1999 single "I Don't Know What You Want But I Can't Give It Anymore", and "Fly" was later included on Lamb's 1999 album Fear of Fours.

"Madhouse" was the last song recorded by Mono before the band broke up.

== Track listing ==
1. "Prelude" (Bernard Herrmann) – Danny Elfman
2. "Living Dead Girl" (Rob Zombie, Scott Humphrey) – Rob Zombie
3. "Once Is Not Enough" (Howie B.) – Howie B.
4. "Psycho" (Leon Payne) – Teddy Thompson
5. "Screaming" (Neil Tennant, Chris Lowe, Tom Stephan) – Pet Shop Boys
6. "Psycho Future" (GVSB) – Girls Against Boys
7. "Honeymoon Suite" (Rob Garza, Eric Hilton) – Thievery Corporation
8. "The Murder" (Herrmann) – Danny Elfman
9. "Madhouse" (Martin Virgo) – Mono
10. "Psycho Killer" (David Byrne, Tina Weymouth, Chris Frantz) – James Hall
11. "All of My Life" (Steve Earle) – Steve Earle
12. "Fly" (Andy Barlow, Louise Rhodes) – Lamb
13. "In the End" (Justin Robertson, Roger Lyons) – Lionrock
14. "The Finale" (Herrmann) – Danny Elfman
