= 5 (Lamb album) =

Studio album by Lamb
- Released: 5 May 2011
- Length: 44:28
- Label: Strata
- Producer: Andy Barlow

Lamb chronology
Best Kept Secrets: The Best of Lamb 1996–2004 (2004)	5 (2011)	Backspace Unwind (2014)

Singles from 5
- 1. "Build a Fire" Released: 5 November 2011; 2. "Butterfly Effect" Released: 13 August 2012

5 is the fifth studio album by English electronic music duo Lamb, released on 5 May 2011 by Strata, after a five-year hiatus.

== Recording and production ==
5 was the first album of new material to be recorded by Lamb following their reformation in 2009.

== Critical reception ==
Professional ratings
Review scores
Source	Rating
The Daily Telegraph	4/5 stars
Mixmag	4/5
Mojo	4/5 stars
Q	4/5 stars
Uncut	3/5 stars

Writing that Lamb had returned from their hiatus as "a different animal", The Daily Telegraph's James Lachno observed that "the industrial electronic beats of old are stripped back" and that lead singer Lou Rhodes's "forlorn, breathy purr" is given greater emphasis on 5, whose sound Lachno described as "a more folk-influenced take on Portishead's down-tempo elegance." In Mixmag, Stephen Worthy praised 5 as Lamb's best album since their 1996 self-titled debut, finding that "as ever, Rhodes' voice, folky, soaring and sweet, acts as a magical counterpoint" to producer Andy Barlow's "intense, emotional digital soundbed." Peter Kane of Q commented that 5 juxtaposes "Barlow's imaginative programming and Rhodes's existential angst ... to particularly powerful effect".

The Independent, however, said that little had changed since Lamb's split, with the band still sounding "middle-class" and unthreatening, although Rhodes's voice was sounding more like that of Stevie Nicks.

== Track listing ==
All tracks are written by Andy Barlow and Lou Rhodes, except where noted.

No.	Title	Length
1.	"Another Language"	4:18
2.	"Butterfly Effect"	3:43
3.	"Build a Fire"	3:43
4.	"Wise Enough"	4:46
5.	"Existential Itch"	2:23
6.	"Strong the Root"	3:51
7.	"Rounds"	4:12
8.	"She Walks"	3:06
9.	"Last Night the Sky"	3:42
10.	"The Spectacle"	4:14
11.	"Back to Beginning" (with Damien Rice; writers: Barlow, Rhodes, Rice, Carrie Tree)	3:32
12.	"The Spectacle (Reprise)"	3:14
Total length:		44:28

Limited edition bonus CD
No.	Title	Length
1.	"Dischord"	2:26
2.	"Back to Beginning" (with Damien Rice; writers: Barlow, Rhodes, Rice, Tree)	3:20
3.	"Strong the Root" (instrumental)	3:42
4.	"Last Night the Sky" (instrumental)	3:26
5.	"Rounds" (demo)	3:15
6.	"Butterfly Effect" (instrumental)	3:47
7.	"Strong the Root" (acapella)	3:30
8.	"Wise Enough" (instrumental)	4:33
9.	"The Spectacle (Reprise)"	3:14
Total length:		31:13

Notes

- "The Spectacle" contains 20 seconds of silence at the end of the track.
- "The Spectacle (Reprise)" is not listed on the back cover of the physical releases.
- Disc one of the limited edition omits "Back to Beginning" and "The Spectacle (Reprise)" and features them as track 2 and track 9, respectively, on disc two.

== Personnel ==
Credits are adapted from the album's liner notes.

Musicians

- Andy Barlow – beats, synthesizers, samplers, keyboards
- Lou Rhodes – vocals, guitar
- Danny Keane – string arrangements (tracks: 4, 9, 10); Rhodes piano (track 7); additional piano (track 10)
- Jon Thorne – double bass (tracks: 3–7, 10, 11)
- Yoav – additional guitar (track 3)
- Stuart Ryan – guitar (track 7)
- Damien Rice – vocals (track 11)
- Nikolaj Bjerre – drums (track 11)
- Carrie Tree – guitar (track 11)
- String section (tracks: 4, 9, 10)
  - Everton Nelson, Emil Chakolov, Emlyn Singleton, Nina Foster, Max Baillie, Chris Worsey, Jon Thorne, Danny Keane, Oli Langford

Production

- Andy Barlow – production; mixing (tracks: 1, 2, 4–9, 10, 11)
- Simon Changer – engineering (tracks: 4, 9, 10)
- Ali Staton – mixing (tracks: 3, 9, 10); additional mixing (track 11)
- Dave Greenberg – mastering

Design

- Lou Rhodes – design, booklet photography
- Nick Tomlinson – design, booklet photography
- Notion23 – design
- Claudia Crobatia – cover photography

== Charts ==
Chart (2011)	Peak position
Belgian Albums (Ultratop Flanders)	51
UK Dance Albums (OCC)	15
