= 5/1 =

5/1 may refer to:

- May 1 (month-day date notation)
- January 5 (day-month date notation)
- A form of quintuple meter
