= Best Kept Secrets: The Best of Lamb 1996–2004 =

Greatest hits album by Lamb
- Released: 21 June 2004
- Length: 71:27
- Label: Mercury
- Producer: Guy Sigsworth

Lamb chronology
Between Darkness and Wonder (2003)	Best Kept Secrets: The Best of Lamb 1996–2004 (2004)	5 (2011)

Professional ratings
Review scores
Source	Rating
AllMusic	4/5 stars

Best Kept Secrets: The Best of Lamb 1996–2004 is the greatest hits collection of British trip hop group Lamb.

== Track listing ==
1. "Cotton Wool"
2. "God Bless"
3. "Gold"
4. "Angelica"
5. "Górecki"
6. "Little Things"
7. "B Line"
8. "Lullaby"
9. "Bonfire"
10. "Heaven"
11. "One"
12. "Gabriel"
13. "Til the Clouds Clear"
14. "Wonder"
15. "Please"
16. "Stronger"

The pregap hidden track "Wonder (Instrumental Version)" can be found before the first track on the CD.

== Charts ==
Chart performance for Best Kept Secrets: The Best of Lamb 1996–2004
Chart (2004)	Peak position
Australian Albums (ARIA)	65
Belgian Albums (Ultratop Flanders)	24
