= Górecki (song) =

"Gorecki"

Single by Lamb

from the album Lamb
- Released: 17 March 1997
- Recorded: 1996
- Genre: Trip hop
- Length: 6:30
- Label: Fontana
- Songwriters: Lou Rhodes, Andrew Barlow

Lamb singles chronology
"God Bless" (1996)	"Gorecki" (1997)	"B Line" (1999)

"Górecki" is a 1997 single by Lamb from their eponymous debut album.

The song samples the second movement of Henryk Górecki's Third Symphony, the Symphony of Sorrowful Songs.

The song peaked at No. 30 on the UK singles chart.

Both tracks "Ear Parcel" and "Lullaby" would later appear on Fear of Fours.

A cover of the song by Chicane was released on 24 November 2017, followed by remixes on 22 December 2017.

== Track listing ==
=== CD1 ===
1. "Górecki" – 6:30
2. "Górecki (instrumental)" – 6:00
3. "Ear Parcel" – 7:49
4. "Lullaby" – 3:35

=== CD2 ===
1. "Górecki" – 6:30
2. "Górecki (edit)" – 3:39
3. "Trans Fatty Acid (Kruder & Dorfmeister Session mix)" – 9:00
4. "Merge (Jimpster's Jam mix)" – 5:43

=== 12" ===
1. "Górecki" – 6:30
2. "Ear Parcel" – 7:49
3. "Trans Fatty Acid (Kruder & Dorfmeister Session mix)" – 9:00

=== 12" single-sided promo ===
1. "Górecki (Global Communication Remix)" – 9:46

Both "Górecki (Global Communication Remix)" and "Trans Fatty Acid (Kruder & Dorfmeister Session mix)" were later included on the "Lamb Remixed" compilation (2005).
