= Between Darkness and Wonder =

Studio album by Lamb
- Released: 3 November 2003
- Genre: Trip hop
- Length: 45:32
- Label: Mercury (UK); Koch Records (US)
- Producer: Lamb

Lamb chronology
What Sound (2001)	Between Darkness and Wonder (2003)	Best Kept Secrets: The Best of Lamb 1996–2004 (2004)

Professional ratings
Aggregate scores
Source	Rating
Metacritic	67/100
Review scores
Source	Rating
AllMusic	3/5 stars
Entertainment Weekly	B+
Filter	84%
The Guardian	2/5 stars
Hot Press	9 1/2/10
The Independent	4/5 stars
Mojo	4/5 stars
Q	4/5 stars
Rolling Stone	3/5 stars
Uncut	3/5 stars

Between Darkness and Wonder is Lamb's fourth album, released in 2003.

== Track listing ==
All tracks were written by Andrew Barlow and Lou Rhodes (as "Lou Robinson"), except where noted. String arrangements by David Campbell.

No.	Title	Length
1.	"Darkness"	4:59
2.	"Stronger"	3:14
3.	"Sugar 5" (Barlow, Rhodes, Jon Thorne, Nikolaj Bjerre, Oddur Mar Runarsson)	3:54
4.	"Angelica" (featuring a sample of the Clair de Lune, part of the Bergamasque Suite of the French composer Claude Debussy))	3:41
5.	"Till the Clouds Clear" (Barlow, Rhodes, Thorne, Runarsson, Bjerre, Pall Bjorgvin Bergthorsson)	4:28
6.	"Wonder"	5:21
7.	"Sun" (Barlow, Rhodes, Bjerre, Thorne, Runarsson)	3:00
8.	"Learn" (Barlow, Rhodes, Sarah Liew, Liz Liew)	2:12
9.	"Please" (Barlow, Rhodes, Thorne, Runarsson)	4:33
10.	"Open Up"	4:48
11.	"Hearts and Flowers"	5:22

== Charts ==
Chart performance for Between Darkness and Wonder
Chart (2003)	Peak position
Australian Albums (ARIA)	59
Belgian Albums (Ultratop Flanders)	20
Portuguese Albums (AFP)	13
Swiss Albums (Schweizer Hitparade)	82
UK Albums (OCC)	96
