= Quintuple meter =

Musical meter of five beats

Quintuple meter or quintuple time is a musical meter characterized by five beats in a measure, whether variably or equally stressed.

Like the more common duple, triple, and quadruple meters, it may be simple, with each beat divided in half, or compound, with each beat divided into thirds. The most common time signatures for simple quintuple meter are 5/4 and 5/8; compound quintuple meter is most often written in 15/8.

== Notation ==
15/8 as five bars of 3/8

15/8 as three bars of 5/8

Simple quintuple meter can be written in 5/4 or 5/8 time, but may also be notated by using regularly alternating bars of triple and duple meters, for example 2/4 + 3/4. Compound quintuple meter, with each of its five beats divided into three parts, can similarly be notated using a time signature of 15/8, by writing triplets on each beat of a simple quintuple signature, or by regularly alternating meters such as 6/8 + 9/8.

Another notational variant involves compound meters, in which two or three numerals take the place of the expected numerator. In simple quintuple meter, the 5 may be replaced as 2+3/8 or 2+1+2/8 for example. A time signature of 15/8, however, does not necessarily mean the music is in a compound quintuple meter. It may, for example, indicate a bar of triple meter in which each beat is subdivided into five parts. In this case, the meter is sometimes characterized as "triple quintuple time".

It is also possible for a 15/8 time signature to be used for an irregular, or additive, metrical pattern, such as groupings of 3+3+3+2+2+2 eighth notes or, for example in the Hymn to the Sun and Hymn to Nemesis by Mesomedes of Crete, 2+2+2+2+2+3+2, which may alternatively be given the composite signature 8+7/8.

Similarly, the presence of some bars with a 5/4 or 5/8 meter signature does not necessarily mean that the music is in quintuple meter overall. The regular alternation of 5/4 and 4/4 in Bruce Hornsby's "The Tango King" (from the album Hot House), for example, results in an overall nonuple meter (5+4 = 9).

== History ==
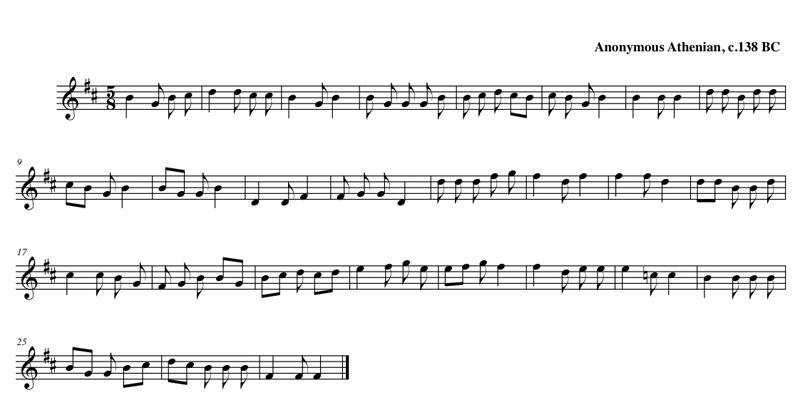
Transcription of the opening of the First Delphic Hymn, by Athenaeus, son of Athenaeus

Before the 20th century, quintuple time was rare in European concert music, but is more commonly found in other cultures.

=== Ancient Greek music ===
Rhythm in ancient Greek music was closely tied to poetic meter, and included what are understood today as quintuple patterns. The two Delphic Hymns from the second century BC both provide examples. The First Delphic Hymn, by Athenaeus, son of Athenaeus, is in the quintuple Cretic meter throughout. The first nine of the ten sections of the Second Hymn, by Limenius, are also in Cretic meter.

In addition to the Cretic meter, which consisted of a long-short-long pattern, ancient Greek music had seven other quintuple meters: Bacchic (L-L-S), Palimbacchic (or antibacchic: S-L-L), four species of Paeanic (L-S-S-S, S-L-S-S, S-S-L-S—which is a composite of pyrrhic and trochee—and S-S-S-L), and hyporchematic (S-S-S-S-S).

=== Asia, Transcaucasia, and the Middle East ===
Arabic theorists already in the early Abbasid period (AD 750–900) described modal rhythmic cycles (īqā‘āt), that included quintuple meters, though taxonomies and terminology vary amongst writers. The first figure to describe these rhythms was Abū Yūsuf Ya‘qūb al-Kindī (ca 801–ca 866), who divided them into two broad categories, ṯẖaqīl ("heavy", meaning slow) and khafīf ("light", meaning quick). Two of his ṯẖaqīl modes—ṯẖaqīl thānī ("second heavy", S-S-L-S) and ramal (L-S-L)—and one khafīf mode are quintuple. The most important writers of the later Abbasid period (AD 900–1258) were Abū Naṣr al-Fārābī (d. 950) and Ibn Sīnā (d. 1037). Al-Fārābī elaborated the rhythmic system established a century earlier by another important early Abbasid musician, Isḥāq al-Mawṣilī, who had based it on local traditions, without any knowledge of classical Greek music theory. Isḥāq's and al-Fārābī's system consisted of eight rhythmic modes, the third and fourth of which were quintuple: called ṯẖaqīl thānī ("second heavy"), and khafīf al-ṯẖaqīl thānī ("second light heavy"), both of which are short-short-short-long, in slow and fast tempo, respectively. This terminology and these definitions continued to be found as late as the 12th century in Muslim Spain, for example in a document by Abd-Allāh ibn Muḥammad ib al-Ṣīd al-Baṭaliawsī.

In the Moroccan Malḥūn repertory (an urban song style closely associated with Andalusian music), 5/8 rhythms are sometimes introduced into the basic meter of 2/4. Turkish classical music employs a system of rhythmic modes (called usul), which include units ranging from two to ten time units. The five-beat meter is called türk aksağı.

The traditional music of Adjara in Western Georgia includes an ancient war-dance called Khorumi, which is in quintuple meter.

The cyclically repeating fixed time cycles of Carnatic and Hindustani classical music, called tālas, include both fast and slow quintuple patterns, as well as binary, ternary, and septenary cycles. In the Carnatic system, there is a complex "formal" system of tālas which is of great antiquity, and a more recent, rather simpler "informal" system, comprising selected tālas from the "formal" system, plus two fast tālas called Cāpu. The slow quintuple tāla, called Jhampā is from the formal system, and consists of a pattern of 7+1+2 beats; the fast quintuple tāla is called khaṇḍa Cāpu or ara Jhampā, and consists of 2+1+2 beats. However, the pattern of beats marking the rotation of the cycle does not necessarily indicate the internal rhythmic organization. For example, although the Jhampā tāla, in its most common miśra variety, is governed by 2+1+2, the most characteristic rhythm of melodies in this tāla is (2+3) + (2+3).

The tālas in Hindustani music are somewhat more complicated. To begin with, they are not systematically codified, but rather comprise a miscellany of patterns from a number of different repertories. Secondly, the counting units (mātrā) of each tāla are grouped into segments called vibhāg, which constitute slower "beats" of from 1 1/2 to 5 of those counting units. Third, in addition to the sounded vibhāg, marked by hand-claps (tālī), there are also vibhāg marked only by a wave of the hand—the so-called khālī beats. The two quintuple tālas in these repertories are Jhaptāl—2+3+(2)+3—and Sūltāl—2+(2)+2+2+(2). Both are measured by ten mātrā units, but Jhaptāl is divided into four unequal vibhāg (the third being a khālī beat) in two halves of five mātrā each, and Sūltāl is divided into five equal vibhāg, the second and fifth of which are khālī.

The kasa repertory of traditional Korean court music often employs cycles in quintuple time, even though Korean traditional music terminology has no specific term for it. This repertory can be traced back in some cases to the fifteenth century. Quintuple meter is also occasionally found in folk music, with perhaps the most well-known example being the Eotmori (엇모리) rhythm (장단) often employed in Sanjo. Quintuple is the oldest surviving traditional Korean meter.

=== Australia ===
Quintuple meter occurs as a variation in some women's dance songs of indigenous Australians, where a 5/8 measure is occasionally inserted into songs with a basic duple or four-beat pattern.

=== The Americas ===
Traditional dance songs of the Yupik of Alaska are accompanied by frame drums, beaten with a long thin wand, most commonly in a 5/8 crotchet–dotted crotchet (quarter–dotted quarter) pattern.

=== European folk music ===
Many European folk and traditional repertories also feature quintuple meter. This is particularly true of Slavic cultural groups. The Bulgarian "paidushko" dance, for example, is in a fast 5, counted 2+3. In north-eastern Poland (especially in Kurpie, Masuria, and northern Podlaskie), five-beat bars are frequently found in wedding songs, with rather slow tempos and not accompanied by dancing. Traditional Russian wedding songs also are in quintuple time. The Poles and Russians share this proclivity for quintuple meter with the Finns, Sami people, Estonians, and Latvians. In Finland, the Kalevalaic "runometric" songs are the most distinctive feature of folk music, and the most common melody of these epic songs is in quintuple meter. This melody was described in the oldest study of runo singing in 1766, but first published in a musical transcription only about 20 years later. One South Slavic example is recorded in a manual published in 1714 by the Venetian dancing master Gregorio Lambranzi. It is a forlana titled "Polesana", probably meaning "From Pola", a city in Istria—today a part of Croatia but a Venetian possession until 1947. Although Lambranzi notated this dance in 6/8 time, its recurring phrase structure shows it to be in compound-quintuple time, so that its correct form is actually written in 15/8.

Greek folk music is also characterized by rhythms in asymmetrical meters. The repertory of the Peloponnese, for example, includes the Doric tsakonikos from Doric-speaking (see Tsakonian language) Kynouria in 5/4 time. The Epirus region of Northern Greece also has dance melodies in a slow 5 (2–3).

Spanish folk music is also noted for the use of quintuple meter, particularly well-known examples being the Castilian rueda and the Basque zortziko, but it is also found in the music of Extremadura, Aragon, Valencia, and Catalonia. Some types of the folk dances collectively referred to as gavottes, and stemming from Lower Brittany in France are in 5/8 meter, though 4/4, 2/4, and 9/8 are also found. In the Alsatian region of Kochersberg, a peasant dance called the Kochersberger Tanz is in 5/8 time, and is similar to a dance of the Upper Palatinate in Bavaria called Der Zwiefache or Gerad und Ungerad, because it alternates even and uneven bars (2/8 and 3/8).

=== European art music ===
==== Medieval and Renaissance ====
In European art music it became possible only in the 14th century to notate quintuple rhythms unambiguously, through the use of minor or reversed coloration. In some instances from the late-14th-century Ars subtilior period, quintuple passages occur which are long enough to regard as an established meter. For example, in the secunda pars of an anonymous two-voice Fortune (MS Paris, Bibliothèque Nationale ital. 568, fol. 3), a "clear and definite rhythm" in the upper part creates a 5/8 meter set against the 6/8 of the lower part. The earliest complete European compositions in quintuple time, however, appear to be seven villancicos in the Cancionero Musical de Palacio, which were composed between 1516 and 1520. Notation of the quintuple meter in these seven pieces is achieved in various ways:

- Juan del Encina uses the mensuration 5/1 in "Amor con fortuna", but in "Tan buen ganadico", he uses a signature of ^{3²}_{5²} (1496).
- Juan de Anchieta uses 5/1 (tempus perfectum, proportio quintupla), in both "Con amores, mi madre" (1465), and "Dos ánades, madre".
- The anonymous "Pensad ora'n al" uses the mensuration 5/2.
- "Las mis penas madre" by Pedro de Escobar and "De ser mal casada" by Diego Fernández (d. 1551) both use just the proportion sign 5/2.

Other examples from the 16th century include the In Nomine "Trust" by Christopher Tye, the "Qui tollis" section of Jacob Obrecht's Missa "Je ne demande", the "Sanctus" from the Missa Paschalis by Heinrich Isaac, and the final "Agnus Dei" of Antoine Brumel's Missa "Bon temps". Keyboard examples from this period include the first half of an English setting of the offertory Felix namque from about 1530, and a passage in no. 41 of the Libro de tientos (1626) by Francisco Correa de Arauxo.

==== Baroque and Classical ====
In the Baroque and Classical eras quintuple meter is, if anything, even less frequently encountered than in the Renaissance. One possible example is the ritornello that precedes and follows Orfeo's aria "Vi ricorda" in act 2 of Claudio Monteverdi's L'Orfeo. The notation is problematic, however, and while several editors (Robert Eitner, Vincent d'Indy, Hugo Leichtentritt, and Carl Orff) have transcribed it in quintuple meter, others interpret it differently. The verses of Giovanni Valentini's madrigal Con guardo altero, published in Musiche a doi voci (1621) is composed in 5/4. Johann Heinrich Schmelzer included a 5/4 section of 27 measures in his Harmonia à 5, composed by at least 1668. Two brief passages of 5/8 occur in the "mad scene" (act 2, scene 11) from Handel's opera Orlando (1732), first at the words "Già solco l'onde" ("Already I am cleaving the waves") when the demented hero believes he has embarked on Charon's boat on the Styx, and then again two bars later. Charles Burney found this whole scene admirable, as a portrait of Orlando's madness, but observed that "Handel has endeavoured to describe the hero's perturbation of intellect by fragments of symphony in 5/8, a division of time which can only be borne in such a situation". Burney's German contemporary, Johann Kirnberger, also felt that "No one can repeat groups of five and even less of seven equal pulses in succession without wearisome strain".

Another exceptional 18th-century example is an entire aria composed in 5/4 time, "Se la sorte mi condanna" found in Andrea Adolfati's opera Arianna (1750), but the English theater composer William Reeve, with the last movement of his Gypsy's Glee (1796), to the words "Come, stain your cheeks with nut or berry" (in 5/4 time) is credited with having composed an example in true quintuple time, "for instead of the usual division of the bar into two parts, such as might be expressed by alternate bars of 3/4 and 2/4, or 2/4 and 3/4, there are five distinct beats in every bar, each consisting of an accent and a non-accent. This freedom from the ordinary alternation of two and three is well expressed by the grouping of the accompaniment, which varies throughout the movement…".

==== 19th century ====
There appear to have been several motivations for composers to use quintuple time: firstly to demonstrate technical skill, as in the Tye and Correa de Arauxo examples, and secondly to produce an atmospheric effect, or to suggest unease or unusual excitement, as in Handel's Orlando. In the 19th century, a third motivation arises with the rise of nationalistic music, which often invokes folk-music elements. In any case, quintuple time becomes much more frequent (though still not common) in the 19th century. Early examples include Fugue 20 (Allegretto) from Anton Reicha's Trente-six fugues for piano (1805), the tenor aria "Viens, gentille dame" from act 2 of François-Adrien Boieldieu's opera La dame blanche (1825), and the third movement (Larghetto, con molta espressione), from Frédéric Chopin's Piano Sonata No. 1 in C minor, Op. 4 (1828). Although Reicha's fugue probably falls into the category of technical skill, the composer does mention taking as a model for the meter the Alsatian Kochersberger Tanz.

Nationalistic influence is clearer in the operas of the Russian composer Mikhail Glinka: the "Nuptial chorus and scene" from act 3 of the opera A Life for the Tsar (1834–1836) was the first time a composer of art music set the pentasyllabic hemistichs of Russian wedding songs in quintuple meter instead of adapting it to a more conventional one. In his next opera, Ruslan and Ludmila (1837–1842) Glinka repeated the effect in the opening of act 1, where the chorus sings an epithalamium to Lel', the Slavonic god of love, once again in quintuple time. Later Russian examples are found in Tchaikovsky's folk-song settings: Fifty Russian Folk Songs for piano four-hands (1868–1869), Children's Ukrainian and Russian Folksongs (book 1: 1872, book 2: 1877), and Sixty-Six Russian Folk Songs for voice and piano (1872), where quintuple meter is notated by regularly alternating signatures, usually 3/4 and 2/4. Also Nikolai Rimski-Korsakov's Russian Easter Festival Overture initial theme is in 5/2.

Shorter passages also occur in the music of Hector Berlioz: La tempête (1830), later incorporated into Lélio as the finale, has "quintuple metre for a whole section, notated in compound duple; 'bars' of 15/4 are defined by a recurring rhythmic pattern and by accents (six 'bars' covering bars 289–306 in the 6/4 notation)", and the "Combat de ceste" (No. 5), from Les Troyens (1856–1858), has "an attractive 5/8 section, only eight bars long". The outer sections of the scherzo from Alexander Borodin's unfinished Third Symphony are in 5/8 time, interrupted six times in bars 36–38, 69–71, 180–182, 218–220, 352–354, and 392–394 with a three-bar group in 2/4. The central trio section, b. 235–313 is in 3/4 time.

From around the middle of the century, there is Carl Loewe's ballad for voice and piano, "Prinz Eugen, der edle Ritter", Op. 92 (to the poem by Ferdinand Freiligrath, 1844), which is in 5/4 time throughout, Ferdinand Hiller's Piano Trio No. 4, Op. 64 (1855) and Rhythmische Studien for piano, a String Trio by K. J. Bischoff, which was awarded a prize by the Deutsche Tonhalle in 1853, and Benjamin Godard's Violin Sonata No. 4, Op. 12 (1872) which includes a scherzo in 5/4 time throughout. The piano virtuoso Charles-Valentin Alkan showed an interest in unusual rhythmic devices, and composed at least four keyboard pieces in quintuple time: the first three of the Deuxième recueil d'impromptus, Op. 32, no. 2 (1849), Andantino, Allegretto, and Vivace (the fourth and last piece in this collection is in septuple meter), and a 5/4 "Zorzico dance" episode in the Petit Caprice, réconciliation, Op. 42 (1857). In opera, Wagner, inserted several 5/4 bars in "Tristan, der Held, in jubelnder Kraft", in act 3 of Tristan und Isolde (1856–1859). Another instance from around this same time is found in Anton Rubinstein's "sacred opera" Der Thurm zu Babel (The Tower of Babel), Op. 80 (1868–1869). In Johannes Brahms's late collection of six vocal quartets, Op. 112, the second piece, "Nächtens", is entirely in 5/4. At the very end of the century, Alban Berg used 5/4 meter throughout his song-setting of Theodor Storm's poem, "Schließe mir die Augen beide" (1900).

Three of the best-known examples of quintuple meter in the symphonic repertoire are from late in the neoromantic (or post-romantic) period, which reaches from the mid-19th century through World War I: the second movement of Tchaikovsky's Symphony No. 6 in B minor, "Pathétique", Op. 74 (1893) (described by one author as the very first example of quintuple meter in Western classical music), Rachmaninoff's The Isle of the Dead, Op. 29 (1908), and the opening movement, "Mars, the Bringer of War" of The Planets (1914–1916) by Gustav Holst. (The final movement, "Neptune, the Mystic", is also in quintuple meter, but this is less well known.) The first theme of Tchaikovsky's Symphony No. 6, mvmt. II is shown below.

The Finnish composer Jean Sibelius used a pattern of quintuple meter in the third movement of Kullervo (1891–1892), where "the orchestra maintains a pattern of five beats in a bar, while the chorus elongates its lines to phrases of fifteen, ten, eight, and twelve beats, respectively". These are Karelian rhythms, reflecting nationalism in Sibelius's music. He used these quintuple meters as well in several male-chorus works: "Venematka" (no. 3 from Six Partsongs, Op. 18, 1893), the third movement, "Hyvää iltaa, lintuseni", from Rakastava, Op. 14 (1894), and "Sortunut ääni" (no. 1 from Six Partsongs, Op. 18, 1898).

In 1895, the British composer Samuel Coleridge-Taylor wrote the second movement, "Serenade", of his Fantasiestücke, Op. 5, for string quartet in 5/4 time. A little more than ten years later, the Scottish composer Robert Ernest Bryson wrote a string-orchestra fantasy titled Vaila in 5/4 time.

In the piano repertoire, the "Promenade", from Modest Mussorgsky's Pictures at an Exhibition (1874), has five versions, in each of which 5/4 is mixed with other meters, regularly or irregularly:

1. 5/4 alternates with 6/4 for eight bars, then two of 6/4 and one pair of 5/4 + 6/4, ending with twelve bars of 6/4
2. 5/4 alternates regularly with 6/4 throughout (effectively 11/4)
3. regular alternation of 5/4 and 6/4 until the final two bars, which are 5/4 and C
4. irregular mixture of 5/4, 6/4, and 7/4, with a single 3/4 bar at the end
5. four pairs of regularly alternating 5/4 and 6/4, then an irregular mixture of 5/4, 6/4, and 7/4 to the end.

The opening measures are shown below:

To this same period (and to the Russian tradition) also belongs "Prizrak" (Phantom), in 5/8 time, which is No. 4 of Sergei Prokofiev's Four Pieces for Piano, Op. 3 (1911).

These examples are all simple quintuple time. Compound quintuple meter is less frequent, but an instance is found in the middle section of the third movement, "Andante grazioso", of Brahms's Piano Trio No. 3 in C minor, Op. 101 (1886), which is in 15/8 with 9/8 turnarounds. "Fêtes", the second movement of Claude Debussy's Nocturnes for orchestra (1892–1899), also has a recurring passage of two 15/8 bars, embedded in a context of mainly compound triple (9/8) bars. The seventh of Florent Schmitt's Eight Short Pieces for piano four-hands (1907–1908), "Complainte", is in 15/8 with occasional bars of 9/8 inserted. The first section of Nikolai Medtner's Piano Sonata Op. 25 No. 2 in E minor ("Night Wind"), which is from 1911, is "perhaps the most extended piece of music in 15/8 time in existence".

==== 20th century ====
The common occurrence of quintuple meter in many folk-music traditions caused an increase in its appearance in the works of composers with nationalistic tendencies in the early 20th century. Examples are the Prelude in the Unison from George Enescu's Orchestral Suite No. 1, Op. 9 (1903), "In Mixolydian Mode", "Bulgarian Rhythm (2)", and the third of "Six Dances in Bulgarian Rhythm", nos. 48, 115, and 150 from Béla Bartók's Mikrokosmos (1926, 1932–1939), the "Chanson épique", no. 2 from Maurice Ravel's song cycle Don Quichotte à Dulcinée (1932–1933), and the first theme group of Carlos Chávez's Sinfonía india (1935–1936), which is predominantly in 5/8 time, but mixed with other meters. Another impulse for the use of quintuple meter was to evoke pagan and specifically Ancient Greek culture. The 5/4 meter of the bacchanalian "Danse générale" concluding Ravel's ballet Daphnis et Chloé (1909–1912) is a particularly well-known example. In his First Symphony, the Sinfonía de Antígona (1933), Carlos Chávez reworked incidental music he had composed in 1932 for a production of Sophocles' Antigone in the adaptation by Jean Cocteau. In this symphony Chávez made extensive use of the Greek paeonic (or cretic) meter, notated in 5/8 time in the score. The fourth and last movement of Ravel's String Quartet is mostly in 5/8 and 5/4 time, alternating several times with 3/4 time.

A fourth example from Ravel is a particularly intense, if brief use of quintuples for symbolic purposes. This is Frontispice for two pianos (1918), written at the request of Ricciotto Canudo to accompany a philosophical meditation on World War I, titled S.P. 503, le poème du Vardar. Canudo's title bears the numerical designation of the postal sector of his combat division, and Ravel used the numbers as the basis of his composition. Five staves of music, "'progressing' vertically from flats through naturals to sharps, are played by five hands (three players) in meters of 15/8 (i.e., ^{(3×5)}_{(3+5)}) and 5/4".

The Basque setting of Pierre Loti's play Ramuntcho made the inclusion of Basque traditional melodies in the incidental music composed for it in 1907 by Gabriel Pierné a natural choice. Pierné included at the end of act 2 an arrangement of the Basque anthem Gernikako Arbola by José María Iparraguirre, which is in zortziko rhythm, but he also quotes traditional zortziko melodies, as well as imitating their quintuple rhythms, in the opening "Ouverture sur des thèmes populaires basques" as well as in the "Rapsodie basque" that serves as an interlude between the first and second tableaux of act 2. Pierné, who was attracted to quintuple meter as part of a broader taste for exoticism, also employed quintuple meter in his Piano Quintet, Op. 41 (1917), and in the Fantaisie basque, Op. 49 (1927), for violin and orchestra. The outer sections of the second movement of the Quintet are in 5/8 time, and marked "Sur une rythme de Zortzico", while the contrasting central section superimposes 20/8 on 4/2 time, in "quadruple quintuple" meter. In the Fantaisie, a long section near the beginning is in 5/8 time, and is marked "Rythme de Zortzico".

Igor Stravinsky's name is often associated with rhythmic innovation in the 20th century, and quintuple meter is sometimes found in his music—for example, the fugato variation in the second movement of his Octet (1922–1923) is written almost uniformly in 5/8 time. Much more characteristically, however, quintuple bars in Stravinsky's scores are found in a context of constantly changing meters, as for example in his ballet The Rite of Spring (1911–1913), where the object appears to be the combination of two- and three-note subdivisions in irregular groupings.

Stravinsky, "Sacrificial Dance" (excerpt), from The Rite of Spring

This treatment of rhythm subsequently became so habitual for Stravinsky that, when he composed his Symphony in C in 1938–1940, he found it worth observing that the first movement had no changes of meter at all (though the metrical irregularities in the third movement of the same work were amongst the most extreme in his entire output).

So many other composers followed Stravinsky's example in the use of irregular meters that the occasional occurrence of quintuple-time bars becomes unremarkable from the 1920s onward. Entire movements with a constant five-to-a-bar rhythm are less-often encountered. An example is the second-movement "Lament" of the Double Concerto for Two Violins and Orchestra, Op. 49 (1929), by Gustav Holst. One particularly notable pre–World War II quintuple-meter composition is the popular first movement, "Aria (Cantilena)" (1938), of the Bachianas Brasileiras no. 5 by Heitor Villa-Lobos (the second movement was added only in 1945). The opening and closing parts of this aria for soprano and orchestra of cellos is predominantly in 5/4, and the middle section is entirely in that meter.

Written during the war, the third movement, Andante calmo, of Benjamin Britten's String Quartet No. 1 (1941) is in 5/4. The Ludus Tonalis by Hindemith (1942) has several instances of quintuple meter: its Preludium and retrograde-inverted Postludium each have a Solenne, largo section in 15/8; Fugue II in G is in 5/8; and though Fugue VIII in D is notated in 4/4, its music is predominantly in 5/4, so shifts one beat forward each measure with respect to its notated meter. The Passacaglia for piano (1943) by Walter Piston is in quintuple meter.

In the post-war period, Gian Carlo Menotti used a quintuple-meter funeral march as an instrumental transition to the final scene of his opera The Consul (1950), and Britten set "Green Leaves Are We, Red Rose Our Golden Queen", the opening chorus from his opera Gloriana, Op. 53 (1952–1953, rev. 1966), in 5/4 time. Dmitri Shostakovich set Fugues 12, 17, and 19 from his Twenty-Four Preludes and Fugues for piano, Op. 87 (1950–1951) entirely in 5/4 time, and also interspersed this time signature with other meters in Preludes 9, 20, and 24, and in Fugues 15 and 16 from the same collection. Fugue No 17 in A♭ major follows in the Slavic tradition of "naturally" flowing music in five time.

Quintuple meter is sometimes employed to characterize particular variations of works in variation form. Examples include the third movement, "Variations on a Ground", from the Double Concerto for Two Violins and Orchestra, Op. 49 (1929), by Gustav Holst (11th and 18th variations in 5/4), "Variation IV: Più mosso" (in 5/8 time), in Part I of The Age of Anxiety: Symphony No. 2 (1949) by Leonard Bernstein. Britten composed his Canticle III ("Still Falls the Rain"), Op. 55 (1954), in variation form, with the "Theme", "Variation IV", and "Variation VI" all in 5/4. In a similar fashion, extended single-movement compositions may set off large sections by using contrasting meters. Quintuple meter is used in this way by Rob du Bois in his Concerto for Two Violins and Orchestra (1979), where bars 160–175 and 227–277 are in 5/8.

In the minimal music that emerged in the late 1960s, quintuple meter is not often encountered. A rare exception is found in an early work by Steve Reich, Reed Phase (1966), which is built on the constant repetition of a five-note basic unit in steady eighth notes.

Reich was not satisfied with the result, largely because of the failure of the meter to produce the kind of rhythmic ambiguity found in the 12-beat patterns he came to favour:

which can divide up in very different ways; and that ambiguity as to whether you're in duple or triple time is, in fact, the rhythmic life-blood of much of my music. In this way, one's listening mind can shift back and forth within the musical fabric, because the fabric encourages that. But if you don't build in that flexibility of perspective, then you wind up with something extremely flat-footed and boring.

Reich's 1979 Octet (originally scored for two pianos, string quartet, and two wind players who perform on both flutes and clarinets), revised and rescored as Eight Lines) is entirely in quintuple time.

=== Jazz and popular music ===
A survey of American popular music found that the most common accent pattern used in quintuple meter is strong-weak-weak-medium-weak.

==== Musical theatre ====
Until after the Second World War, quintuple time was virtually unheard of in the American genres of jazz and popular music. When in 1944, Stravinsky was commissioned by Billy Rose to compose a fifteen-minute dance component to be incorporated into his Broadway revue, The Seven Lively Arts, Stravinsky composed Scènes de ballet, to be choreographed by Anton Dolin. Rose was enthusiastic about the new score when initially he saw the piano reduction made by Ingolf Dahl, but later was dismayed by the sound of the orchestra, and offended the composer by telegraphing the suggestion that Stravinsky should allow the scoring to be "retouched" by Robert Russell Bennett, who "orchestrates even the works of Cole Porter". Whole sections of the score had to be cut for the Philadelphia premiere, because the New York pit musicians, accustomed to the conventions of Broadway musicals of that period, were unable to manage the 5/8 bars that feature in Stravinsky's score.

A dozen years later, things were changing in musical theater in New York. Leonard Bernstein's Candide opened on Broadway in December 1956, and featured a variety of meters that Billy Rose's musicians would have found as impossible as Stravinsky's. In act 1, the quartet "Universal Good" is a chorale in 5/4 time, and the main verses of "Ballad of Eldorado" in act 2 are in 5/8, with turnarounds in 7/8 or 3/4 + 7/8. Mary Rodgers's 1959 Once Upon a Mattress featured the 5/4 song "Sensitivity". Later examples in musical theater include the song "Everything's Alright", from Jesus Christ Superstar (1971), by Andrew Lloyd Webber, which is mainly in 5/4, and "Ladies in Their Sensitivities" from Stephen Sondheim's Sweeney Todd (1979), which is in 5/8. Sondheim also alternates 5/4 with 4/4 (at the passage beginning "Living like a shut-in") and 5/4 and 6/4 (at "All I ever dreamed I'd be") in the song "In Buddy's Eyes' from Follies (1971).

==== Jazz ====
In 1914, American ragtime composers James Reese Europe and Ford Dabney composed and recorded a dance tune in 5/4 called "Castles' Half and Half", based on a dance created by Vernon and Irene Castle (described as a "hesitation waltz"). Additional tunes in 5/4 were also composed by others in 1914 to accompany the dance.

In 1959, the Dave Brubeck Quartet released Time Out, a jazz album with music in unusual meters. It included Paul Desmond's "Take Five", in 5/4 time. Brubeck had studied with the French composer Darius Milhaud, who in turn had been strongly influenced by Stravinsky, and is credited with the systematic introduction of asymmetrical and shifting rhythms that sparked a far-reaching surge of interest in jazz and popular music in the 1960s.

The 1960 Max Roach album We Insist! contains three tracks making use of 5/4.

Starting in 1964, the trumpeter and band leader Don Ellis sought to fuse traditional big-band styles with rhythms borrowed from Indian and Near Eastern music; this was largely initiated by his UCLA ethnomusicology studies with Indian percussionist and sitar player Harihar Rao and his contact with Turkish-American music producer Arif Mardin. For example, one of his largest works, Variations for Trumpet, is divided into six sections with meters including 5/4, 9/4, 7/4, and 32/8. Two other Ellis compositions are entirely in 5/4 time: "Indian Lady" and "5/4 Getaway".

In 1966, the popular American television drama series Mission: Impossible began a seven-season run with the 5/4 "Theme from Mission: Impossible" by Lalo Schifrin.

In 1968, Leonard Feather interviewed pianist Johnny Guarnieri in DownBeat magazine; Guarnieri had spent the last few years working up arrangements of jazz standards changed to a 5/4 rhythm. Guarnieri stated "I can forsee 5/4, within the next few years, sweeping the world completely". Shortly afterwards, Guarnieri released an album on BET records called Breakthrough in 5/4, which consisted of original compositions in 5/4, jazz standards changed to 5/4, as well as a version of Yesterday in 5/4.

==== Rock ====
In the late 1960s, quintuple meters began to appear with some frequency in rock music; exploration of meters other than 4/4 became one of the hallmarks of progressive rock. One of the earliest examples is "Grim Reaper of Love" by The Turtles (May 1966). Another early example is the instrumental that ends the George Harrison song "Within You Without You" (from the 1967 Beatles' LP "Sgt. Pepper's Lonely Hearts Club Band"); isolated 5/4 bars also occur in the Beatles' songs "Happiness Is a Warm Gun" and "Across the Universe". The Byrds' LP The Notorious Byrd Brothers (recorded in the second half of 1967, and released in January 1968) contained two songs using quintuple meter, "Get to You" and "Tribal Gathering".

Under the influence of Brubeck, Keith Emerson of Emerson, Lake & Palmer began exploring unusual meters at about this same time. His first quintuple-meter piece was "Azrael, the Angel of Death", written in 1968, and the meter cropped up again three years later in the opening instrumental section, "Eruption", of the title track and some later passages from the album Tarkus.

The Grateful Dead song "Playing in the Band" was provisionally originally titled "The Main Ten", because it is performed in 10/4.

Frank Zappa frequently played in 5; two documented examples are "Flower Punk" from 1968 (a repeating pattern of 4 bars of 5 followed by 4 bars of 7) and "Five Five Five" (bars of 5/8 combined with bars of 5/4). Zappa also had a hand signal to cue the band to switch to a quintuple meter during a live performance.

== Examples in popular music ==
Title	Artist	Year	Notes
"Aliens"	Coldplay	2017	
"Azrael (Angel of Death)"	The Nice	1967	written by Keith Emerson, released as a bonus track on the 1999 release of The Thoughts of Emerlist Davjack
"Bahlawan"	Mira Awad	2015	5/8
"Bane's theme" (from The Dark Knight Rises)	Hans Zimmer	2012	
"Black Widow Spider"	Dr. John	1969	from the album Babylon. Described as inspired by Dave Brubeck's "Take Five".
"Caesar's Palace Blues"	U.K.	1979	5/4; from the album Danger Money.
"Closure"	Taylor Swift	2020	from the album Evermore.
"Countdown"	Dave Brubeck	1962	
"Dance of the Little Fairies"	Sky	1980	
"Divinize"	Rosalía	2025	5/4; from Lux (Rosalía album)
"Do What You Like"	Blind Faith	1969	5/4
"Donkey Carol"	John Rutter	1976	5/8; a Christmas carol.
"English Roundabout"	XTC	1982	from English Settlement
"Face Dances, Pt. 2"	Pete Townshend	1982	5/4
"15 Step"	Radiohead	2007	from In Rainbows
"5/4"	Gorillaz	2001	5/4
"5-4=Unity"	Pavement	1994	
"Morning Bell"	Radiohead	2000	from Kid A
"Five"	Lamb	1999	from Fear of Fours
"Five Five Five"	Frank Zappa	1981	bars of 5/8 combined with bars of 5/4
"From Eden"	Hozier	2014	5/4
"Get to You"	The Byrds	1968	recorded late 1967, for The Notorious Byrd Brothers
"Grim Reaper of Love"	The Turtles	1966	
"Halloween Theme (main title)"	John Carpenter	1978	from Halloween
"Happiness Is a Warm Gun"	The Beatles	1968	written by John Lennon and Paul McCartney
"Here Come The Bastards"	Primus	1991	5/4; from Sailing the Seas of Cheese
"Icon"	OHMME	2018	5/4
"In Her Eyes"	Josh Groban	2006	5/4; from the Awake
"The Incredits"	Michael Giacchino	2004	main theme for The Incredibles 5/4
"Isengard Theme" (from The Lord of the Rings film trilogy)	Howard Shore	2002	
"Kamisama no Shitauchi"	Akeboshi	2005	5/4
"Last Night"	Vanessa Hudgens	2008	
"Living in the Past"	Jethro Tull	1969	5/4
"River Man"	Nick Drake	1969	5/4
"Seven Days"	Sting	1993	3+2/4
"Soft Mistake"	Lamb	1999	from Fear of Fours
"Turn the World Around"	Harry Belafonte	1977	5/4
"Tribal Gathering"	The Byrds	1968	recorded late 1967, for The Notorious Byrd Brothers
"Wind"	Akeboshi	2002	5/4
"Within You Without You"	The Beatles	1967	written by George Harrison; recorded on Sgt. Pepper's Lonely Hearts Club Band
"WTF?"	OK Go	2010	5/4

=== Partially in quintuple time ===
- "Alphys" (from Undertale) by Toby Fox – last movement is in 5/4
- "Animals" by Muse.
- "Cleopatra" by Weezer. Alternates 5/4 with 4/4
- "Come On! Feel the Illinoise! (Part I: The World's Columbian Exposition – Part II: Carl Sandburg Visits Me in a Dream)" from Illinois (2005) by Sufjan Stevens (5/4 and 4/4).
- "Down And Out" by Genesis (5/4).
- "Electro" by Sungazer has a section towards the end in 5/16, which the band's bassist Adam Neely mentioned on tour in London.
- "ENDYMION" (from Dance Dance Revolution A) by fallen shepherd ft. RabbiTon Strings (5/4).
- "Erotomania" (part I of III of the suite called "A Mind Beside Itself") from Awake, by Dream Theater. Begins with 5/4 + 5/4 + 5/4 + 9/8, then 5/4 + 5/4 + 5/4 + 3/4 + 3/4 + 2/4, then 11/8 + 10/8 etc.
- "Vs. Ridley" (from Super Metroid) by Minako Hamano. Song starts in 5/4 but goes to 4/4 and then 3/4. Second part reverses this by going to 3/4 then 4/4.
- "The Fixer" by Pearl Jam. The song begins in 5/4 but most of it is in 6/4 and 4/4.
- "Four Sticks" by Led Zeppelin. Verses alternate 5/4 and 3/4 passages; choruses are in 3/4.
- "Five Magics" by Megadeth. Predominantly in 4/4 with sections in both 5/8 and 5/4.
- "The Grudge" by Tool.
- "The Hammer" from Matilda the Musical by Tim Minchin: begins in 5/4.
- "Happy Jack" by the Who. Verses partly in 5/4.
- "Innuendo" by Queen.
- "Larks Tongues In Aspic" by King Crimson (partially in 5/4 and 5/8).
- "Lorca" by Tim Buckley, from the 1970 album Lorca.
- "Moon" by Björk (17/8 and 5/8).
- "Mother" (from The Wall) and "Two Suns in the Sunset" (from The Final Cut), both by Pink Floyd (5/4).
- "My Wave" by Soundgarden, verse in 5/4.
- "Neon Pattern Drum" by Jon Hopkins has "5/4 and 4/4 time signatures operat[ing] simultaneously".
- "953" by Black Midi
- "The Number of the Beast" by Iron Maiden
- "Og det bli'r sommer igen" by Lars Lilholt Band; bar 3 is in 5/4.
- "Overground" by Siouxsie and the Banshees.
- Percolator by Stereolab is in 5/4 throughout. This is referenced in the alternate set list title for the song of Take 5 1/2
- "Pray You Catch Me" by Beyoncé, James Blake, and Kevin Garrett, alternating 2/4 + 3/4.
- "Prequel to the Sequel" by Between the Buried and Me has some scattered bars in 5/8 and other time signatures.
- "Question!" by System of a Down (5/4).
- "Red" by King Crimson, from the album Red (5/8).
- "The River" by King Gizzard & the Lizard Wizard is in 5/4 until the final verse, which switches to 4/4 through the outro.
- "Refractions in the Plastic Pulse" by Stereolab has a section in 5/4.
- "Rosetta Stoned" by Tool.
- "Sound Chaser" by Yes, main theme in 5/4.
- "Kid Gloves" by Rush.
- "Streamline" by System of a Down, the majority of the chorus is in 5/4 while the rest of the song is written in 6/4
- "TWX in 12 Bars" by Donald Swartz, the theme for the TV program Wall Street Week with Louis Rukeyser.
- While most of "Voglio vederti danzare" by Franco Battiato is in 4/4, the first bar of each chorus is in 5/4.
- "We Are the Involuntary" by Underoath has some bars that can be transcribed in 5/4.
- "White Room" by Cream. An opening in 5/4 , which is used twice later in the song, as a bridge and an interlude.
- "YYZ" by Rush opens in 5/4 using a musical interpretation of the Toronto Pearson International Airport IATA identifier code using Morse code.

== Sources ==
- Anon. n.d.(a). "The Trees by Rush". Songfacts 2011 website. (Accessed 1 January 2011)
- Anon. n.d.(b) "Cream—White Room: Clapton 1—Overdriven Guitar". Songsterr.com (accessed 20 February 2019).
- Anon. n.d.(c). "The 2nd Law". Discography World (Accessed 2 August 2013).
- Anon. n.d.(d). One Hundred Best Tracks of the Sixties: No. 66, Nick Drake, River Man NME 60 Years of New Music website (accessed 30 January 2015).
- Anon. n.d.(e). "Question! by System of a Down". Songfacts website (accessed 2 November 2019).
- Anon. n.d.(f). "Breakthrough in 5/4". "Discogs.com" webpage; contains images of front and back of LP cover. Accessed 20 January 2021.
- Anon. 2008. "RZA, Los Lonely Boys have new CDs". Billboard (accessed 12 May 2015).
- Anon. 2009a. "Erotomania–Guitar Tab". Guitar World (archive from 20 July 2010).
- Anon. 2009b. Liner notes for the album Save the Turtles: The Turtles Greatest Hits. CD recording. Manifesto Records. Flo and Eddie Inc.
- Anon. 2016. "From Eden: Hozier". Genius.com (accessed 9 September 2016).
- Anon. 2007–2015. "Innuendo". Queen Songs: Recording and Songwriting (accessed 25 August 2015).
- Apel, Willi. 1951. "Anent a Ritornello in Monteverdi's Orfeo". Musica Disciplina 5:213–222.
- Apel, Willi. 1961. The Notation of Polyphonic Music 900–1600, fifth edition, revised and with commentary. The Medieval Academy of America Publication no. 38. Cambridge, Massachusetts: The Medieval Academy of America.
- Archibald, Bruce. 1992. "Consul, The". The New Grove Dictionary of Opera, 4 vols., edited by Stanley Sadie. London: Macmillan Press Limited.
- Asplund, Anneli. 1985. "Runometriska sånger". Sumlen: Årsbok för vis- och folkmusikforskning: 23–52.
- Banks, Tony, Phil Collins, and Mike Rutherford. 1978. "Down and Out" (sheet music). GelringLimited; Hit & Run Music (Publishing) Limited.
- Bartók, Béla. 1940. Mikrokosmos: Progressive Piano Pieces = Pièces de piano progressives = Zongoramuzsika a kezdet legkezdetétöl, 6 vols. New York and London: Boosey & Hawkes.
- Belafonte, Harry; Freedman, Robert (1975). "Turn the World Around". Musicnotes.com.
- Bennett, Dan. 2008. The Total Rock Bassist: A Fun and Comprehensive Overview of Rock Bass Playing. Includes CD with demonstration tracks. Van Nuys, CA: Alfred Publishing Co.
- Berg, Alban. 1955. Zwei Lieder/Two Songs. [Two settings of "Schließe mir die Augen beide", by Theodor Storm. English version by Eric Smith.] Vienna: Universal Edition.
- Bernstein, Leonard. 1993. The Age of Anxiety: Symphony No. 2, for piano and orchestra, after W. H. Auden, revised version, full score, corrected edition. [New York]: Jalni Publications, Inc., Boosey & Hawkes.
- Bernstein, Leonard. 1994. Candide: A Comic Operetta in Two Acts, Scottish Opera edition of the opera-house version (1989). Book by Hugh Wheeler, based on the satire by Voltaire; lyrics by Richard Wilbur, with additional lyrics by Stephen Sondheim, John Latouche, Dorothy Parker, Lillian Hellman, and Leonard Bernstein; edited by Charles Harmon. [New York]: Jalni Publications, Inc.; Boosey & Hawkes.
- Beyoncé, James Blake, and Kevin Garrett. 2016. "Pray You Catch Me". [S.l.]: WB Music Corp/Sony/ATV Musi9c Publishing/Roc Nation.
- Bois, Rob du. 1979. Concert voor twee violen en orkest. Amsterdam: Donemus.
- Borodin, Alexander. n.d. Symphony No. 3, completed and edited by Alexander Glazunov. Leipzig and Bonn: M. P. Belaieff; Zürich and London: Ernst Eulenberg, Ltd.
- Bowden, Sean L. 2018. "Max Roach and M'Boom: Diasporic Soundings in American Percussion Music". DMA Dissertation. University of California at San Diego.
- Brahms, Johannes. [1891]. Sechs Quartette für Sopran, Alt, Tenor, Bass mit Pianoforte, Op. 112. Leipzig: Edition Peters.
- Brahms, Johannes. 1972. Trios, für Klavier, Violine und Violoncello, nach Eigenschriften, Erstausgaben und Handexemplaren des Komponisten hrsg. von Ernst Herttrich; Fingersatz der Klavierstimme von Hans-Martin Theopold. Munich: G. Henle Verlag.
- Britten, Benjamin. 1956. Canticle III ('Still Falls the Rain'), Op. 55, for tenor, horn, and piano. Words by Edith Sitwell. London, Paris, Bonn, Cape Town, Sydney, Toronto, Buenos Aires, New York: Boosey & Co., Ltd.
- Browne, David. 2001. Dream Brother. New York: Harper Collins.
- Butcher, Pauline. 2011. Freak Out! My Life with Frank Zappa. London: Plexus Press.
- Burney, Charles. 1789. A General History of Music, from the Earliest Ages to the Present Period. To Which Is Prefixed, a Dissertation on the Music of the Ancients, second edition, 4 vols. London: Printed for the author and sold by T. Becket, J. Robson, and G. Robinson.
- Chávez, Carlos. 1948. Sinfonía de Antígona. G. Schirmer's Edition of Study Scores of Orchestral Works and Chamber Music, No. 45. New York: G. Schirmer, Inc.
- Chávez, Carlos. 1950. Sinfonía India. G. Schirmer's Edition of Study Scores of Orchestral Works and Chamber Music, No. 56. New York: G. Schirmer, Inc.
- Chevalier, Dominique. 1986. Viva Zappa. New York: St Martin's Press.
- Chianis, Sotirios, and Rudolph M. Brandl. 2001. "Greece, §IV: Traditional Music". The New Grove Dictionary of Music and Musicians, second edition, edited by Stanley Sadie and John Tyrrell. London: Macmillan Publishers.
- Chopin, Frédéric. 1976. Sonaten, kritisch revidiert von Herrmann Scholtz, Neue Ausgabe von Bronislaw von Pozniak. Frankfurt and New York: C.F. Peters.
- Cohen, Jonathan. 2009. "Pearl Jam: The 'Backspacer' Audio Q&As". Billboard (8 September) (Accessed 13 August 2013).
- Condit, Jonathan. 1978. "Uncovering Earlier Melodic Forms from Modern Performance: The Kasa Repertoire". Asian Music 9, no. 2 (Korean Music Issue): 3–20.
- Craft, Robert. 2007. "Igor Stravinsky (1882–1971): Later Ballets". Liner booklet to Stravinsky, Later Ballets: Jeu de cartes, Danses concertants, Scènes de ballet, Variations, Capriccio for Piano and Orchestra, 4–8. Mark Wait (piano), Philharmonia Orchestra, London Philharmonic Orchestra, Twentieth Century Classics Ensemble, Orchestra of St Lukes; Robert Craft, cond. CD recording. Naxos 8.557506.
- Cunningham, Martin, and Jaume Aiats. 2001. "Spain, §II: Traditional and Popular Music". The New Grove Dictionary of Music and Musicians, second edition, edited by Stanley Sadie and John Tyrrell. London: Macmillan Publishers.
- Debussy, Claude. 1941. Nocturnes. Hampton Miniature Scores, vol. 7 (Berlioz, Bizet, Debussy), 69–96. New York: Edward B. Marks Music Corporation.
- Dibben, Nikki. 2011. "Moon: Analyse". www.bjork.fr (Accessed 8 May 2012).
- Dickow, Robert H. 2002. "Ellis, Don(ald Johnson)". The New Grove Dictionary of Jazz, second edition, edited by Barry Kernfeld. 3 vols. London: Macmillan Publishers. ISBN 0-333-69189-X.
- Doe, Paul (ed.). 1988. Elizabethan Consort Music: II. Musica Britannica 45. London: Stainer and Bell, published for the Musica Britannica Trust.
- Dolidze, Leah, Christian Hannick, Dali Dolidze, Grigol Chkhikvadze, and Joseph Jordania. 2001. "Georgia". The New Grove Dictionary of Music and Musicians, second edition, edited by Stanley Sadie and John Tyrrell. London: Macmillan Publishers.
- Drozdowski, Ted. 2011. "Soundgarden's Meanest 10 Tunes". Gibson Lifestyle (18 March) (Accessed 22 May 2011).
- Eddie, William Alexander. 2007. Charles Valentin Alkan: His Life and His Music. Aldershot, England; Burlington, Vermont: Ashgate. ISBN 1-84014-260-X.
- Emerson, Keith, Greg Lake, and Carl Palmer. 1980. "Tarkus". [S.l.]: Manticore Music Ltd.
- Engel, Carl. 1876. Musical Myths and Facts, vol. 1 (of 2). London: Novello, Ewer, & Co.
- Everett, Walter. 2008. The Foundations of Rock: From "Blue Suede Shoes" to "Suite: Judy Blue Eyes". New York: Oxford University Press. ISBN 978-0-19-531023-8.
- Feather, Leonard. 1968. "Johnny Guarnieri's New Bag". DownBeat Magazine, v 35, #9.
- Fenlon, Sean. 2002. The Exotic Rhythms of Don Ellis. DMA diss. Baltimore: Johns Hopkins University, Peabody Institute. ISBN 0-493-60448-0.
- Film Score Junkie. 2013. Musical Themes in the Dark Knight Trilogy, Part 5 of 6: The Dark Knight Rises. FilmMusicNotes.com blogsite (accessed 25 August 2015).
- Fishko, Sara. 2008. "Playing Five Beats to the Measure". NPR Music Articles. npr.org (accessed 12 May 2015).
- Fripp, Robert, interviewed by Dave Mandl. 1991. "Interview with Robert Fripp Reflex Magazine.
- Fujita, Tetsuya, Yuji Hagino, Hajime Kubo, and Goro Sato (transcribers). 1993. The Beatles Complete Scores. London: Hal Leonard Publishing Corporation. ISBN 0-7935-1832-6.
- Future Music. 2016. "Classic Album: Lamb on Fear of Fours". musicradar.com (accessed 5 February 2020).
- García Morillo, Roberto. 1960. Carlos Chávez: vida y obra. México: Fondo de Cultura Económica. ISBN 968-16-0222-6.
- Glinka, Mikhail. 1907. Жизнь за царя [Zhizno za tsaria], foreword by Nikolai Rimsky-Korsakov and Alexander Glazunov. Leipzig: M. P. Belaieff.
- Godard, Benjamin. 1880. Violin Sonata No. 4, Op. 12. Bote & Bock.
- Gutmann, Peter. 2003. "Peter Ilyich Tchaikovsky: Symphony #6 ("Pathetique")" Classical Notes (accessed 2008-03-23).
- Hansell, Sven, and Carlida Steffan. 2001. "Adolfati, Andrea". The New Grove Dictionary of Music and Musicians, second edition, edited by Stanley Sadie and John Tyrrell. London: Macmillan Publishers.
- Harris, Steve. 1982. "The Number of the Beast" (sheet music). [USA]: Zomba Music Publishers Limited.
- Heartz, Daniel. 1999. "A Venetian Dancing Master Teaches the Forlana: Lambranzi's Balli teatrali". The Journal of Musicology 17, no. 1 (Winter):136–151.
- Heisel, Scott. 2014. "Weezer: Everything Will Be Alright in the End". Alternative Press (7 October; archive from 10 October 2014, accessed 10 October 2014).
- Helmore, Rev. Thomas. 1879. "Accent". A Dictionary of Music and Musicians (A.D. 1450–1889) by Eminent Writers, English and Foreign, 2 vols, edited by George Grove, 1:12–18. London: Macmillan.
- Hepokoski, James. 2001. "Sibelius, Jean". The New Grove Dictionary of Music and Musicians, second edition, edited by Stanley Sadie and John Tyrrell. London: Macmillan Publishers.
- Hiley, David. 2001. "Quintuple Metre". The New Grove Dictionary of Music and Musicians, second edition, edited by Stanley Sadie and John Tyrrell, vol. 20:682–683. London: Macmillan Publishers.
- Hindemith, Paul. 1942. Ludus Tonalis. Mainz: B. Schott's Söhne.
- Holst, Gustav. 1973. Double Concerto, Op. 49, for two violins and orchestra. Revised edition by Imogen Holst. London: Curwen Edition, Faber Music Ltd.; New York: G. Schirmer Inc. First published in 1930 by J Curwen & Sons Ltd.
- Holst, Gustav. 1979. The Planets: Suite for Large Orchestra, Op. 32. New edition prepared by Imogen Holst and Colin Matthews. Hawkes Pocket Scores 22. London: Boosey & Hawkes.
- Holmes, David (26 May 2016). "The 10 Best Sufjan Stevens Songs – 1. 'Come On! Feel The Illinoise! (Part I: The World's Columbian Exposition – Part II: Carl Sandberg Visits Me In A Dream)'". Stereogum.
- Hornsby, B[ruce]. R[andall]. 1995. "The Tango King" (sheet music). [N.p.]: WB Music Corp. and Basically Zappo Music.
- Horowitz, Mark Eden, and Stephen Sondheim. 2010. Sondheim on Music: Minor Details and Major Decisions, second edition. Lanham, Maryland; Plymouth, UK: Scarecrow Press. ISBN 978-0-8108-7436-7 (cloth); ISBN 978-0-8108-7437-4 (ebook).
- Howard, Patricia. 1969. The Operas of Benjamin Britten: An Introduction. New York and Washington: Frederick A. Praeger, Publishers.
- Hudson, Barton. 2001. "Brumel [Brummel, Brommel, Brunel, Brunello], Antoine". The New Grove Dictionary of Music and Musicians, second edition, edited by Stanley Sadie and John Tyrrell. London: Macmillan Publishers.
- IrishDrummerGuy. 2011. "Vinnie Colaiuta Explains Sting's Seven Days". YouTube (19 December) (Accessed 24 March 2013).
- Johnston, Thomas F. 1989. "Song Categories and Musical Style of the Yupik Eskimo". Anthropos 84, nos. 4–6:423–431.
- Karger, Dave. 1996. "They Shot, He Scored: We Talk with the Composer About His Decades-Long Career". Entertainment Weekly (7 June). (Accessed 16 March 2011)
- Katzif, Mike. 2008. "Five More in 5/4". NPR Music website (accessed 27 October 2019).
- Kernfeld, Barry. 2002. "Beat" The New Grove Dictionary of Jazz, second edition, edited by Barry Dean Kernfeld. 3 vols. London: Macmillan Publishers; New York: Grove's Dictionaries Inc.. ISBN 1-56159-284-6; ISBN 0-333-69189-X.
- Kirnberger, Johann Philipp. [1776] 1982. The Art of Strict Musical Composition, translated by David Beach and Jirgen Thym, with an introduction and explanatory notes by David Beach. Music Theory Translation Series 4. New Haven and London: Yale University Press. ISBN 0-300-02483-5.
- Kkunurashima. [2006]. Akeboshi: Profile. J-Music Ignited.com (archived from the original on 24 February 2008, accessed 22 October 2010)
- Kroetsch, Terence R. 1996. "A Baroque Model in the Twentieth Century: The Preludes and Fuges, Opus 87 of Dmitri Shostakovich". MA thesis. London, Ontario: The University of Western Ontario.
- Kulash, Damian Joseph; Go, O. K. (20 September 2010). "WTF?". Musicnotes.com.
- Led Zeppelin (musical group). 1973. Led Zeppelin Complete. New York: SuperHype Publishing.
- Lee, Hye-ku (I, Hye-gu). 1981. "Quintuple Meter in Korean Instrumental Music". Asian music: Journal of the Society for Asian Music 13, no. 1: 119–129.
- Lilholt, Lars. n.d. "Og de blir sommer igen". LarsLilholtBand.dk (accessed 25 August 2015).
- Little, Meredith Ellis. 2001. "Gavotte". The New Grove Dictionary of Music and Musicians, second edition, edited by Stanley Sadie and John Tyrrell. London: Macmillan Publishers.
- Lloyd Webber, Andrew (music), and Tim Rice (lyrics). 1970. Jesus Christ Superstar, vocal score, selections. New York: Universal—MCA Music; Miami: Warner Bros. Publications. ISBN 0-88188-541-X.
- Loewe, Carl. [ca. 1900]. "Prinz Eugen, der edle Ritter: Ballade", Op. 92: Scores at the International Music Score Library Project, edited and revised by Hugo Hartmann. Adolf Kunz's Musikalische Volksbibliothek No. 5699-700. Leipzig: Adolf Kunz's Musikverlag.
- Macan, Edward. 1997. Rocking the Classics: English Progressive Rock and the Counterculture. New York: Oxford University Press. ISBN 978-0-19-509888-4.
- Macdonald, Hugh. 2001. "Alkan [Morhange], (Charles-)Valentin". The New Grove Dictionary of Music and Musicians, second edition, edited by Stanley Sadie and John Tyrrell. London: Macmillan Publishers.
- Martyn, Barrie. 1998. Medtner: The Complete Piano Sonatas (Media notes). Marc-André Hamelin. London: Hyperion Records. CDA67221/4.
- Masson, Georges. 2001. "Pierné, (Henri Constant) Gabriel". The New Grove Dictionary of Music and Musicians, second edition, edited by Stanley Sadie and John Tyrrell. London: Macmillan Publishers.
- Mawer, Deborah. 2000a. "Musical Objects and Machines". In The Cambridge Companion to Ravel, edited by Deborah Mawer, 47–70. Cambridge: Cambridge University Press. ISBN 0-521-64026-1 (cloth) ISBN 0-521-64856-4 (pbk).
- Mawer, Deborah. 2000b. "Ballet and the Apotheosis of the Dance". In The Cambridge Companion to Ravel, edited by Deborah Mawer, 140–161. Cambridge: Cambridge University Press. ISBN 0-521-64026-1 (cloth) ISBN 0-521-64856-4 (pbk).
- May, Elizabeth, and Stephen Wild. 1967. "Aboriginal Music on the Laverton Reservation, Western Australia". Ethnomusicology 11, no. 2 (May): 207–217.
- Menck, Ric. 2007. The Notorious Byrd Brothers. 33 1/3 Series, No. 43. New York and London: Continuum ISBN 978-0-8264-1717-6.
- Michael, Giacchino. 2007. "The Incredits". Musicnotes.com (30 April 2007; accessed 25 March 2019).
- Mills, Austin. 2014. "Prequel to the Sequel Bass Tab by Between the Buried and Me @ 911Tabs".
- Murphy, Scott. 2016. "Cohn's Platonic Model and the Regular Irregularities of Recent Popular Multimedia". Music Theory Online 22/3.
- Mussorgsky, Modest Petrovich. 1914. Tableaux d'une exposition (Pictures at an Exhibition): 10 Pieces for Piano, edited by O. Thümer. [N.p.]: Augener; London: Stainer and Bell Ltd; New York: Galaxy Music Corporation.
- NatuMz (transcriber). n.d. "Underoath: We Are the Involuntary Tab", transcribed by. UltimateGuitar.com
- Neubauer, Eckhard. 2001. "Isḥāq al-Mawṣilī". The New Grove Dictionary of Music and Musicians, second edition, edited by Stanley Sadie and John Tyrrell. London: Macmillan Publishers.
- Nice, David. 2003. Prokofiev: From Russia to the West, 1891–1935. New Haven and London: Yale University Press. ISBN 0-300-09914-2.
- Ochs, Michael, Jeff Cohen, Andy Selby, and Josh Groban. 2008. "In Her Eyes". Musicnotes.com (accessed 25 March 2019).
- Parker, Roger. 2013. "Britten and the String Quartet: A Classical Impulse–String Quartet No.1". Gresham College (accessed 22 October 2022).
- Paxman, Jon. 2014. Classical Music 1600–2000: A Chronology. London: Omnibus Press. ISBN 978-1-46831-272-0.
- Peristeres, Spyros. 1956. Liner notes to Folk Dances of Greece LP, Folkways F-4467. New York: Folkways Records.
- Pierné, Gabriel. 1908a. Ramuntcho: 2e Suite. Paris: Enoch & Cie.
- Pierné, Gabriel. 1908b. Ramuntcho: Ouverture sur des thèmes populaires basques. Paris: Enoch & Cie.
- Pierné, Gabriel. 1908c. Ramuntcho: Pièce en 5 actes, arr. piano by the composer. Paris: Enoch & Cie.
- Pierné, Gabriel. 1919. Quintette en trois parties, pour piano, 2 violons, alto et violoncelle, Op. 41. Paris: Julien Hamelle publisher.
- Pierné, Gabriel. 1928. Fantaisie basque, sur des thèmes populaires Basques Espagnols, for violin and orchestra, Op. 49. Paris: Durand & Cie.
- Piston, Walter. 1942. Passacaglia. Bryn Mawr, Pennsylvania: Mercury Music Corp.
- Pöhlmann, Egert, and Martin L. West. 2001. Documents of Ancient Greek Music: The Extant Melodies and Fragments, edited and transcribed with commentary by Egert Pöhlmann and Martin L. West. Oxford: Clarendon Press. ISBN 0-19-815223-X.
- Pope, Isabel, and Tess Knighton. 2001. "Fernández, Diego". The New Grove Dictionary of Music and Musicians, second edition, edited by Stanley Sadie and John Tyrrell. London: Macmillan Publishers.
- Potter, Keith. 2000. Four Musical Minimalists: La Monte Young, Terry Riley, Steve Reich, Philip Glass. Cambridge and New York: Cambridge University Press. ISBN 0-521-01501-4.
- Powers, Harold S. 2001. "India, §III, 4: Theory and Practice of Classical Music: Rhythm & Tāla." The New Grove Dictionary of Music and Musicians, second edition, edited by Stanley Sadie and John Tyrrell. London: Macmillan Publishers.
- Prokofiev, Sergei. 1926. Сказка, Шутка, Марш, Призрак [Skazka, Shutka, Marsh, Prizrak]. (Conte, Badinage, Marche, Fantôme), Op. 3, для фортепяно. Moscow: Gos. izd-vo, Muzykal'nyi sektor.
- Primus (musical group). 2000. Primus Anthology, transcribed by Jeff Jacobson, 2 vols. New York: Cherry Lane Music. ISBN 1-57560-154-0 (vol. 1); ISBN 1-57560-216-4 (vol. 2).
- Rachmaninoff, Sergei. 2003. The Isle of the Dead: Symphonic Poem after the Painting by Arnold Böcklin, Op. 29. Mineola, New York: Dover. ISBN 0-486-42667-X.
- Ravel, Maurice. 1905. Quatuor pour instruments à cordes. Paris: G. Astruc.
- Ravel, Maurice. 1934. Don Quichotte à Dulcinée. Paris: Editions Durand.
- Ravel, Maurice. 1975. Frontispice: [pour S. P. 503 (poème du Vardar) de R. Canudo]: deux pianos [cinq mains]. Paris and New York: Éditions Salabert.
- Read, Gardner. 1964. Music Notation: A Manual of Modern Practice. Boston: Allyn and Bacon, Inc.
- Rebennack, Malcolm. 1993. Liner notes to "Mos' Scocious: The Dr. John Anthology". Rhino Records 71450.
- Reich, Steve. 1979. Octet. [United States]: Hendon Music, Boosey & Hawkes.
- Reich, Steve. 1998. Eight Lines (Octet), revised edition. [United States]: Hendon Music, Boosey & Hawkes.
- Reich, Steve. 2002. Writings on Music 1965–2000, edited with an introduction by Paul Hillier. Oxford and New York: Oxford University Press. ISBN 978-0-19-511171-2 (cloth); ISBN 978-0-19-515115-2 (pbk).
- Reicha, Anton. 1973. 36 Fugen für Klavier, edited by Václav Jan Sýkora. Kassel: Bärenreiter.
- Reinhard, Kurt, and Martin Stokes. 2001. "Turkey: IV. Art music, 3. 'Usul'". The New Grove Dictionary of Music and Musicians, second edition, edited by Stanley Sadie and John Tyrrell. London: Macmillan Publishers.
- Reuland, John T. 2011. "Nailed It!" In Rush and Philosophy: Heart and Mind United, edited by Jim Berti and Durrell Bowman, 59–74. Popular Culture and Philosophy 57. Chicago: Open Court. ISBN 978-0-8126-9716-2.
- Riccio, Gabriel. 2004. "Rock Meets Classical, Part 4: Classical Concepts in King Crimson's 'Larks Tongues in Aspic'". www.brutalprog.com. Archived from the original on 25 March 2019.
- Richards, Paul. 1987. "Africa in the Music of Samuel Coleridge-Taylor". Africa: Journal of the International African Institute 57, no. 4 ("Sierra Leone, 1787–1987"): 566–571.
- Rice, Timothy. 1994. May It Fill Your Soul: Experiencing Bulgarian Music. Chicago and London: University of Chicago Press.
- Rodgers, Mary. 1967. Once upon a mattress.. Milwaukee, Wisconsin: Hal Leonard. ISBN 9780881880410.
- Ross, Alex. 2007. "Kullervo in the Woods: Rescuing Sibelius from Silence". The New Yorker (9 July).
- Rushton, Julian (1983). The Musical Language of Berlioz. Cambridge Studies in Music. Cambridge and New York: Cambridge University Press. ISBN 978-0-521-24279-0.
- Rutter, John. 1976. Oxford Carols: Donkey Carol (sheet music). Oxford: Oxford University Press. ISBN 9780193430556.
- Salinas, Franciscus. 1577. De musica libri septem. Salamanca: Mathias Gastius. Facsimile reprint, edited by Macario Santiago Kastner. Documenta musicologica 1. Reihe, Druckschriften-Faksimiles 13. Kassel: Bärenreiter, 1958. Spanish edition, as Siete libros sobre la música, translated by Ismael Fernández de la Cuesta. Colección Opera Omnia. Madrid: Alpuerto, 1983. ISBN 84-381-0052-X.
- Sandke, Randy. 2012. Roads Not Taken: Jazz Innovation Anachronisms. Current Research In Jazz, Vol 4
- Saull, Jordan. 2014. Non-isochronous meter: A study of cross-cultural practices, analytic technique, and implications for jazz pedagogy. PhD thesis. Toronto, Ontario: York University.
- Sawa, George Dimitri. 2004. "Baghdadi Rhythmic Theories and Practices in Twelfth-Century Andalusia". In Music and Medieval Manuscripts: Paleography and Performance: Essays Dedicated to Andrew Hughes, edited by John Haines and Randall Rosenfeld, 151–181. Aldershot, Hants, England; Burlington, VT: Ashgate Publishing, Ltd., 2004. ISBN 978-0-7546-0991-9.
- Schmitt, Florent. 1909. Huit courtes pièces pour piano à quatre mains: VII, "Complainte", Op. 41, No. 7. Paris: Heugel & Cie.
- Schmitt, Stephan. 1995. "Die proportio quintupla in einigen villancicos des Cancionero musical de Palacio". Anuario musical: Revista de musicología del C.S.I.C. 50:3–22.
- Schuyler, Philip. 2001. "Morocco." The New Grove Dictionary of Music and Musicians, second edition, edited by Stanley Sadie and John Tyrrell. London: Macmillan Publishers.
- Shaffer, Claire. 2020. "Aaron Dessner on How His Collaborative Chemistry With Taylor Swift Led to 'Evermore'". Rolling Stone.
- Shiraki, Scott, and E. E. Bradman. 2001. "Justin Chancellor of Tool: Handy Man: How Justin Chancellor Frames Tool's Metal Madness". Bass Player (May): (Archive from 27 September 2009, accessed 11 November 2018)
- Shore, Howard. 2002. Commentary track, The Lord of the Rings: The Fellowship of the Ring. Extended Edition DVD.
- Sliwa, Richard. 2005. "Sky 2". Plum Cream website (Accessed 5 December 2010).
- Spencer, Kristopher. 2008. Film and Television Scores, 1950–1979: A Critical Survey by Genre. Jefferson, N.C.: McFarland & Co., Publishers. ISBN 9780786436828.
- Stęszewski, Jan. 2001. "Poland [Polish Republic] II. Traditional Music: 6. Music Regions." The New Grove Dictionary of Music and Musicians, second edition, edited by Stanley Sadie and John Tyrrell. London: Macmillan Publishers.
- Stringer, Bruce. n.d. "Progressive Rock CD Reviews: UK / Danger Money". Music Street Journal.
- Suwannakit, Supon. 2014. The Overview Treatment of Odd Meters in The History of Jazz. Rangsit Music Journal, Vol 9, #1.
- Taruskin, Richard. 1992a. "Life for the Tsar, A [Zhizn' za tsarya; Ivan Susanin]". The New Grove Dictionary of Opera, edited by Stanley Sadie. London: Macmillan Publishers.
- Taruskin, Richard. 1992b. "Ruslan and Lyudmila [Ruslan i Lyudmila]". The New Grove Dictionary of Opera, edited by Stanley Sadie. London: Macmillan Publishers.
- Taylor, Franklin. 1890. "Quintuple Time", in A Dictionary of Music and Musicians (A.D. 1450–1889), in four volumes, edited by Sir George Grove, D.C.L. London and New York: The Macmillan Company.
- Thompson, Stephen. 2018. "Jon Hopkins Enters The 'Singularity,' Track By Track". npr.com. 4 May 2018 (accessed 29 February 2020).
- Tiemann, Jeff. 2014. "Streamline Tab by System of a Down". Ultimate-Guitar.com (accessed 2 April 2017)
- Townshend, Peter. 1966. "Happy Jack". London: Fabulous Music, Ltd.
- Townshend, Pete. n.d. "Face Dances Part 2" (bass part), Jellynote.com (accessed 2 November 2019).
- Tschaikowsky, Peter Ilich. n.d. Symphony No. 6 (Pathétique) in B Minor, Op. 74. New York: M. Baron Co.
- Tye, Christopher. 1967. The Instrumental Music, edited by Robert W. Weidner. Recent Researches in the Music of the Renaissance 3. New Haven: A-R Editions.
- Ulrich, Charles. 2018. The Big Note: A Guide to the Recordings of Frank Zappa. Vancouver: New Star Books.
- Vai, Steve (transcriber). 1982. The Frank Zappa Guitar Book. [S.l.]: Hal Leonard.
- Villa-Lobos, Heitor. 1947. Bachianas Brasilerias No. 5, for soprano and orchestra of violoncelli (1938) New York: Associated Music Publishers.
- Voicana, Mircea, Clemansa Firca, Alfred Hoffman, and Elena Zottoviceanu, in collaboration with Myriam Marbe, Stefan Niculescu, and Adrian Ratiu. 1971. George Enescu: Monografie, 2 vols. Bucharest: Editura Academiei Republicii Socialiste România.
- Waters, Roger. [1999] "Vintage Pink Floyd Interview Part 1". Classic Rock Magazine Archived 13 April 2009 at the Wayback Machine
- West, M[artin] L[itchfield]. 1992. Ancient Greek Music. Oxford: Clarendon Press; New York: Oxford University Press. ISBN 0-19-814897-6 (cloth); ISBN 0-19-814975-1 (pbk).
- White, Eric Walter. 1979. Stravinsky: The Composer and His Works, second edition. Berkeley and Los Angeles: The University of California Press. ISBN 0-520-03985-8.
- Wiehmayer, Theodor. 1917. Musikalische Rhythmik und Metrik. Magdeburg: Heinrichshofen's Verlag.
- Woodward, Roger (1975). Notes to CD 14302-2. Celestial Harmonies.
- Wright, Owen, and Christian Poché. 2001. "Arab Music, §I: Art Music". The New Grove Dictionary of Music and Musicians, second edition, edited by Stanley Sadie and John Tyrrell. London: Macmillan Publishers.
- Yes (musical group). 1981. Yes Complete, deluxe edition. New York: Warner Bros Publications. ISBN 0-7692-0865-7.
- Young, J. B., and Jeremy Montagu. 1975. "7/8 Metres". Early Music 3, no. 1 (January): 77 + 79.
