= 5/8 =

5/8 may refer to:

- the calendar date August 5 of the Gregorian calendar
- the calendar date May 8 (USA)
- The fraction five eighths or 0.625 in decimal
- A time signature of quintuple meter in music
- Five-eighth, a position in rugby league football
