= What Sound =

2001 studio album by Lamb

Studio album by Lamb
- Released: 8 October 2001
- Genres: Electronica; trip hop; house; drum and bass
- Length: 48:15
- Label: Mercury

Lamb chronology
Fear of Fours (1999)	What Sound (2001)	Between Darkness and Wonder (2003)

What Sound is the third album by English electronic music group Lamb, released in October 2001. The first single to be released from the album was "Gabriel", and it reached number 1 in Portugal. The second single to be released was "Sweet", and it reached number 6 in Portugal.

Original members Andy Barlow and Lou Rhodes are joined by session musicians Arto Lindsay on guitar, Me'Shell NdegéOcello on bass, and Michael Franti with additional vocal work. Doves guitarist Jimi Goodwin, producers Guy Sigsworth, Nellee Hooper and Richard Dorfmeister (one half of Kruder & Dorfmeister) also contributed to the album. The track "Heaven" was used frequently on the HBO television series Six Feet Under.

== Critical reception ==
Professional ratings
Aggregate scores
Source	Rating
Metacritic	78/100
Review scores
Source	Rating
AllMusic	4.5/5 stars
The Guardian	3/5 stars
Jockey Slut	4/5 stars
Los Angeles Times	3.5/4 stars
Mixmag	3/5
Muzik	3/5
Q	3/5 stars
Rock Sound	4/5 stars
Stylus Magazine	7.0/10
Uncut	4/5 stars

What Sound received generally positive reviews from music critics. At Metacritic, which assigns a normalised rating out of 100 to reviews from professional publications, the album has an average score of 78, based on seven reviews.

== Track listing ==
No.	Title	Length
1.	"What Sound"	3:39
2.	"One"	4:14
3.	"Sweet"	3:52
4.	"I Cry"	5:23
5.	"Scratch Bass"	4:45
6.	"Heaven"	4:59
7.	"Small"	5:18
8.	"Written"	3:34
9.	"Gabriel"	4:17
10.	"Sweetheart"	4:06
11.	"Just Is"	4:08

A hidden track called "Blessing in Disguise" follows a period of silence after the final track.

Note: Some editions do not feature the track "Written".

== Deluxe Edition track listing ==
1. "What Sound" – (3:44)
2. "One" – (4:16)
3. "Sweet" – (3:53)
4. "I Cry" – (5:25)
5. "Scratch Bass" – (4:47)
6. "Heaven" – (5:00)
7. "Small" – (5:21)
8. "Gabriel" – (4:20)
9. "Sweetheart" – (4:09)
10. "Just Is" – (4:11)
11. "Gabriel" (MJ Cole mix) – (7:03)
12. "Written" – (3:36)
13. "Night Has a Thousand Eyes" – (5:42)
14. "Gabriel" (Nellee Hooper mix) – (4:03)
15. "Blessing in Disguise" – (1:44)
16. "Gabriel" (Video)
17. "Sweet" (Video)
18. "Trans Fatty Acid" (Kruder & Dorfmeister session mix) (video)
19. "Cottonwool" (Fila Brazillia mix) (video)
20. "Sweet" (Soulchild Radio mix) (video)
21. "Heaven" (Funkstörung mix) (video)

== Limited Edition 2CD track listing ==
Disc 1
No.	Title	Length
1.	"What Sound"	3:43
2.	"One"	4:16
3.	"Sweet"	3:53
4.	"I Cry"	5:26
5.	"Scratch Bass"	4:47
6.	"Heaven"	5:00
7.	"Small"	5:22
8.	"Gabriel"	4:20
9.	"Sweetheart"	4:09
10.	"Just Is / Blessing in Disguise" ("Blessing in Disguise" starts at 9:32)	11:17

Disc 2
No.	Title	Length
1.	"Sweet" (Soulchild Radio Mix)	3:40
2.	"B Line" (Andy Votel Mix)	5:36
3.	"Gold" (Hipoptimist Alchemy Mix)	6:33
4.	"God Bless" (Pulsinger Mix)	7:52
5.	"Trans Fatty Acid" (K&D Mix)	9:02
6.	"Cottonwool" (Fila Brazilla Mix)	8:28
7.	"Górecki" (Live in Brussels)	7:03
8.	"Sweet" (Live in Brussels)	4:03
9.	"Sweetheart" (Live in Brussels)	4:29
10.	"Bonfire" (Live in Brussels)	5:34

== Charts ==
=== Weekly charts ===
Chart (2001)	Peak position
Australian Albums (ARIA)	40
Belgian Albums (Ultratop Flanders)	16
Dutch Albums (Album Top 100)	65
German Albums (Offizielle Top 100)	87
Portuguese Albums (AFP)	9
Scottish Albums (Official Charts)	62
UK Albums (Official Charts)	54

=== Year-end charts ===
Chart (2002)	Position
Belgian Albums (Ultratop Flanders)	97
