= Lamb (album) =

Studio album by Lamb
- Released: 30 September 1996
- Studio: The Toyshop (Manchester); Lou Rhodes's home (Manchester); Ridge Farm (Rusper)
- Genre: Trip hop; drum and bass
- Length: 65:14
- Label: Fontana
- Producer: Lamb

Lamb chronology
| Lamb (1996) | Fear of Fours (1999) |

Singles from Lamb
- 1. "Cotton Wool" Released: 1 January 1996; 2. "Gold" Released: 25 March 1996; 3. "God Bless" Released: 28 October 1996; 4. "Górecki" Released: 17 March 1997

Lamb is the debut studio album by English electronic music duo Lamb. It was released on 30 September 1996 by Fontana Records.

In the United States, Lamb was released in 1997 and distributed by Fontana's parent label Mercury Records. The album was reissued on LP by Music on Vinyl on 10 March 2014.

== Critical reception ==
Professional ratings
Review scores
| Source | Rating |
|---|---|
| AllMusic | 4.5/5 stars |
| Almost Cool | 7.5/10 |
| Entertainment Weekly | B+ |
| The Guardian | 4/5 stars |
| Launch | 60/100 |
| Muzik | 4.5/5 |
| NME | 6/10 |
| Q | 4/5 stars |
| Rolling Stone | 3/5 stars |
| Rolling Stone Australia | 4/5 stars |

In Melody Maker, Sharon O'Connell lauded Lamb's fusion of the "kinetics" of drum and bass with "the sensuality of soul" on Lamb, describing the album's musical style as a "sumptuously organic" take on drum and bass incorporating varied instrumentation and the "gorgeous, haunted voice" of lead singer Lou Rhodes. Martin James of Muzik, noting Rhodes's folk music lineage and her bandmate Andy Barlow's roots in "the breakbeat tradition", highlighted the duo's juxtaposition of "genres, sonics and emotions" throughout Lamb. The Guardian's Dan Glaister credited Rhodes's "fragile vocals" for giving the music "an original context", while Matt Diehl commented in Entertainment Weekly that she "shows how emotionally satisfying techno can be." Dele Fadele was more lukewarm towards the record in NME, finding it derivative of "Portishead's version of trip-hop" while conceding that Lamb have a "distinct identity that sneaks out through the pores of the whole".

AllMusic critic Stephen Thomas Erlewine praised Lamb in retrospect as "one of the more hypnotic byproducts of trip-hop", observing a "classy, detached, and cool" approach to the genre distinguishing the album "from the avant-garde sensibilities of Tricky and the haunted romanticism of Portishead, or even the pop leanings of Sneaker Pimps and the soul-inflected grooves of Morcheeba." In 2021, Slant Magazine listed Lamb as the tenth-best trip hop album of all time, with staff writer Sal Cinquemani calling it "nervy, innovative, and complex—boasting shifting time signatures, stuttering machine-gun beats, and eccentric vocal turns by singer Lou Rhodes, who stretches her uniquely colorful voice over producer Andy Barlow's tight, jazzy arrangements."

== Track listing ==
All tracks are written by Andy Barlow and Lou Rhodes.

| No. | Title | Length |
|---|---|---|
| 1. | "Lusty" | 4:09 |
| 2. | "God Bless" | 5:54 |
| 3. | "Cotton Wool" | 5:07 |
| 4. | "Trans Fatty Acid" | 7:37 |
| 5. | "Zero" | 5:31 |
| 6. | "Merge" | 5:44 |
| 7. | "Gold" | 5:40 |
| 8. | "Closer" | 3:51 |
| 9. | "Górecki" | 6:30 |
| 10. | "Feela" | 6:44 |
| 11. | "Cotton Wool" (Fila Brazillia mix) | 8:27 |
| Total length: | | 65:14 |

2014 reissue bonus tracks
| No. | Title | Length |
|---|---|---|
| 12. | "Trans Fatty Acid" (Kruder & Dorfmeister remix) | 9:00 |
| 13. | "Górecki" (Global Communication mix) | 9:46 |
| Total length: | | 84:00 |

Notes

- On the CD edition of the album, "Cotton Wool" (Fila Brazillia mix) is a hidden track that begins two minutes after the end of "Feela". On the LP edition, it is included in the printed track listing.

== Personnel ==
Credits are adapted from the album's liner notes.

Lamb

- Andy Barlow
- Lou Rhodes

Additional musicians

- The Chainsaw Sisters – cello
- Steve Christian – guitar
- Graham Massey – vibraphone
- Paddy Steer – double bass
- Jon Thorne – double bass

Production

- Ian Cooper – mastering
- Fila Brazillia – remixing on "Cotton Wool" (Fila Brazillia mix)
- Lamb – production, recording
- Aidan Love – mixing on "Gold"
- Ali Staton – mixing, additional recording

Design

- Karen Lamond – photography
- Rick Myers – design

== Charts ==
| Chart (1996) | Peak position |
|---|---|
| UK Albums (OCC) | 109 |
| UK Dance Albums (OCC) | 7 |
