= Dadara =

Dutch artist

- Dadara in his studio with works from the Exchanghibition Bank project, 2011.
- Born: Daniel Piotr Rozenberg; 8 February 1969 (age 57); Łódź, Poland
- Education: Willem de Kooning Academy
- Website: http://dadara.nl/

Dadara or Daniel Rozenberg (born 8 February 1969, Łódź, Poland) is a Dutch artist of Polish ancestry known for his flyers, paintings, album covers, statues and performance artwork. He is the son of renowned computer scientist Grzegorz Rozenberg.

== Biography ==
After finishing high school in 1986, Dadara briefly studied mechanical engineering at the Delft University of Technology, after which he studied at the Free Academy Psychopolis in The Hague, the Academy of Industrial Design in Eindhoven, and the Academy of Visual Design in Genk (Belgium), before graduating from the Willem de Kooning Academy in Rotterdam in 1992.

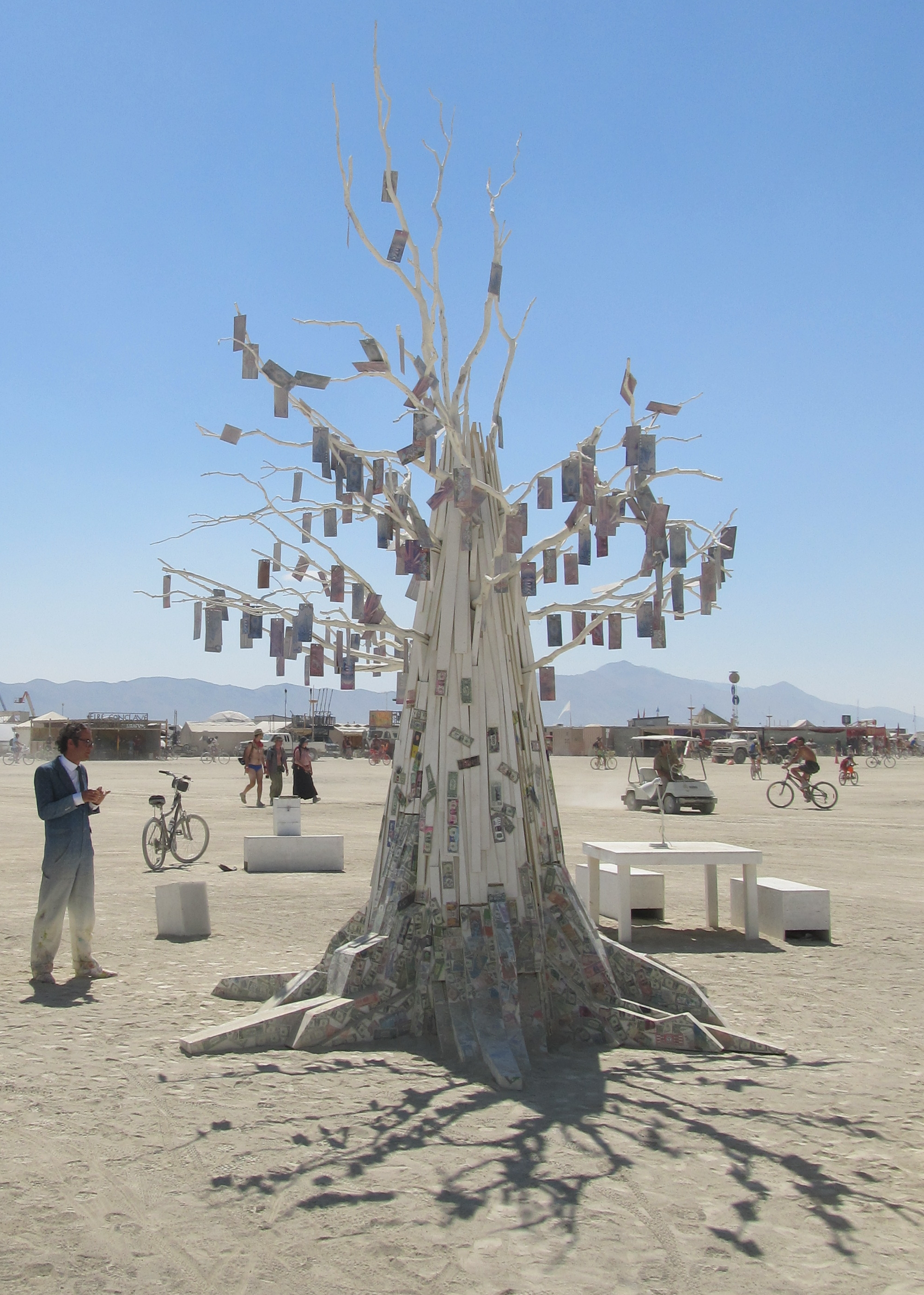
Transformoney Tree Burning Man 2012 with Dadara

After completing studies, Dadara started designing flyers, live-paintings and record covers for the then upcoming international electronic house music scene. This included work for the RoXY club in Amsterdam, Outland Records, and the Mystery Land festival. The public recognition gained through this underground exposure led his paintings to be noticed by the Reflex Modern Art Gallery in Amsterdam, where till today he had ten solo-exhibitions, as well as exhibitions in Paris, Berlin, Stuttgart, Miami and New York City.

Commissions include baby-shaped loudspeakers for B&W, an Absolut Vodka ad, a Greenpeace campaign, invited artist for Expo 2000 in Hannover, and a 70 meters long mural for Leiden University in the Netherlands.

In the past 10 years, Dadara mainly focused on both large interactive art projects and making paintings. The common thread throughout most of these works is that they provide a commentary on contemporary society. Topics include on one hand governmental control, lack of transparency, privacy issues, and regulations, and on the other hand value creation, money, and dreams.

== Projects ==
=== Greyman ===
In 1999 Dadara built his first big public sculpture: the 9 meters high Greyman Statue of No Liberty in front of the Rijksmuseum in Amsterdam. This marked the beginning of the production and design of more big public pieces, which over time became more interactive, combining theatrical aspects with the use of multi-media.

Statue of no liberty, in front of Rijksmuseum in Amsterdam

=== Fools ark ===
In 2002 Dadara built a wooden three-master, the Fools Ark, which was built during the Over het IJ festival in the old Amsterdam NDSM shipyards, then was used as mainstage for Mystery Land, before crossing the Atlantic Ocean to be burned at the Burning Man festival in Nevada. After its burn the Fools Ark rose like a Phoenix from its ashes to be burnt again on the island of Terschelling during the Oerol festival ('continuing its journey through the clouds, granting wishes and desires to all aboard....').

Footage of the Fools Ark and next year's Grey man project was intertwined into an audio-visual journey through forgotten worlds to tell the tale behind the project, resulting in the part documentary/ part animated movie "Fall and Rise of the Fools Ark".

The music on the DVD Fall and Rise of the Fools ark was composed by Lamb.

=== Love, Peace, and Terror tank ===
In 2007 a big pink tank was built on a rooftop in the center of Amsterdam as part of the Love, Peace and Terror project, which was later blown to pieces with explosives in an act of aesthetic visual terrorism.

Love, Peace, and Terror tank exploding.

=== Checkpoint Dreamyourtopia ===
During his artist in residence period at CentralTrak in Dallas 2008–2009, Texas, Dadara worked on Checkpoint Dreamyourtopia, a border control checkpoint to enter your own Dreams, which could be experienced in Nevada and Texas before crossing borders itself, after which it was resurrected at the Lowlands Festival and destroyed in Berlin in an old swimming pool, where the walls between dreams and reality were smashed with chainsaws and sledgehammers twenty years after the Berlin Wall came crumbling down.

=== Exchanghibition Bank and Transformoney Tree ===
In 2010, Dadara started working on the Pool of Plenty project: a pool filled with millions of money bills, bundled in stacks. A closer look at the pool will reveal that the bills in the pool are not real money, but pieces of aesthetically pleasing art. The pool will be protected by security guards so not one of the bills can be removed. Visitors who do want a bill though, can buy or rather exchange one at a bank initiated by Dadara – the Exchanghibition bank. This bank will take form as a traveling exchange booth. Amsterdam Central Station and Paradiso are two of the pop-up locations. The project links to a dedicated blog about the value of art and money. In August 2012, the Exchanghibition Bank travelled to Burning Man in the Black Rock Desert of Nevada, an event based on the principle of a gift economy, where no money changes hands. The Exchangibition Bank gifted people a zero banknote in exchange for the signing of a "Spiritual Karma Laundering Contract." The project was featured in Rolling Stone. The Transformoney Tree is a tree, which has the Exchanghibition Banknotes with denominations such as Zero, Million, and Infinite hanging as leaves from its branches. Visitors are invited to glue real money onto its trunk. The tree has appeared at Burning Man (2012), Mysteryland at Woodstock (2014) and the California State Capitol (2023).

=== Like4Real ===
In 2013 he started his own cult worshipping a 50 feet high Golden Like in the Nevada desert at Burning Man and guiding people on their Path to Spiritual Enlikement.

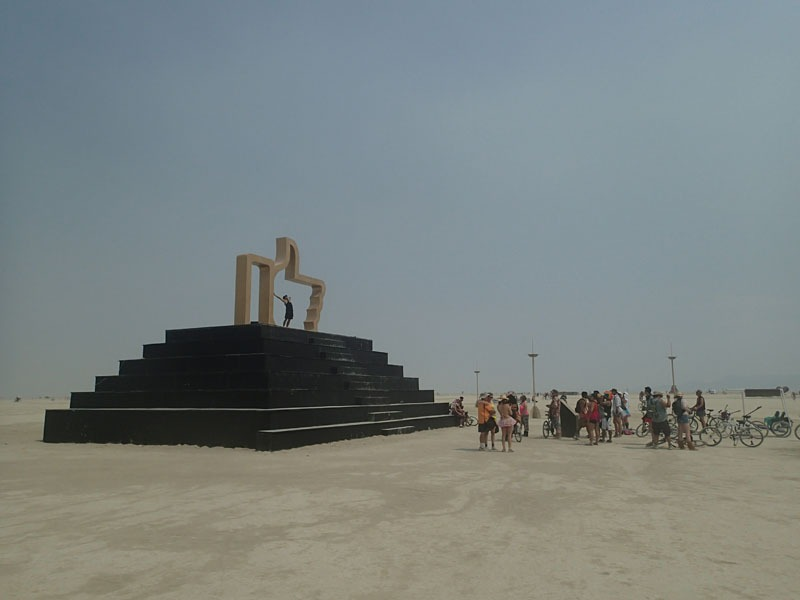
Like4Real art installation at Burning Man

He also organized a Funeral for the Like in Paradiso in Amsterdam. In collaboration with ISH Dance Collective Like4Real was made into a theatre play for Oerol Festival.

=== The Artist is not Present ===
In the spring of 2020, the COVID lockdown inspired him to spontaneously install “The Artist is not Present” on the Museum Square in Amsterdam. During the lockdown all museums and cultural institutions were shut down. Cultural life was really suffering and he felt that it was nowhere more visible than on the normally thriving Museum Square (surrounded by cultural institutions such as Stedelijk Museum, Rijksmuseum and Van Gogh Museum, which was now eerily empty.

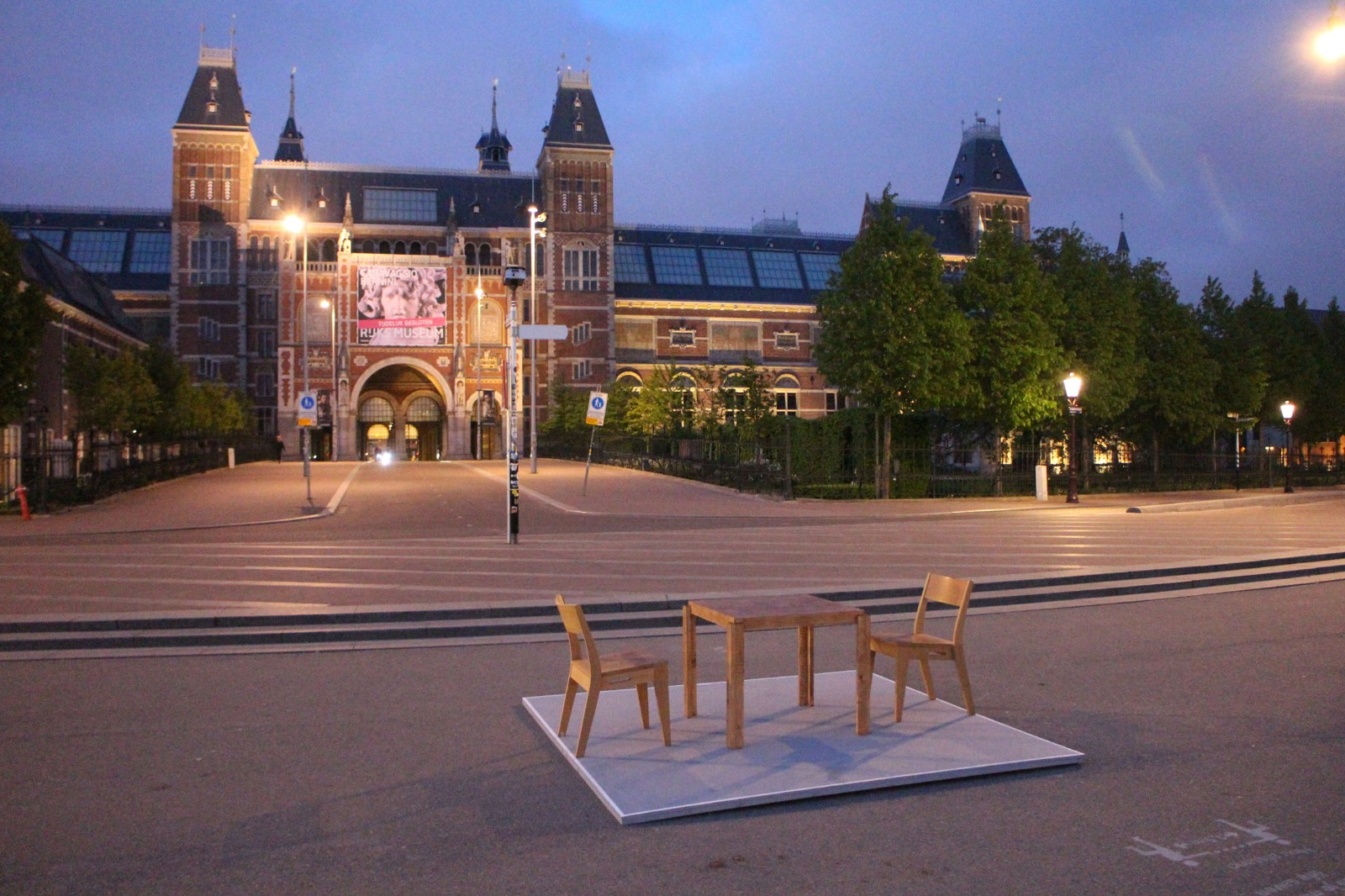
The Artist is not Present, 2020

The installation consisted of a table and two chairs, mounted on a platform with “The Artist is not Present” inscribed on the attached plaque.

It was referring to the famous “The Artist is Present” performance by Marina Abramović at the MOMA in New York in 2010, where Marina was seated at a wooden table across from an empty chair, waiting for people to take turns sitting in the chair and locking eyes with her. Over the course of nearly three months, for eight hours a day, she met the gaze of over a thousand strangers. A truly impactful performance, but without the artist sitting there, it would be just a table with two chairs.

After a few days the artwork was removed by the police. Dadara then proceeded to make a sculpture of the police removing the installation which was then acquired by the Amsterdam Museum.

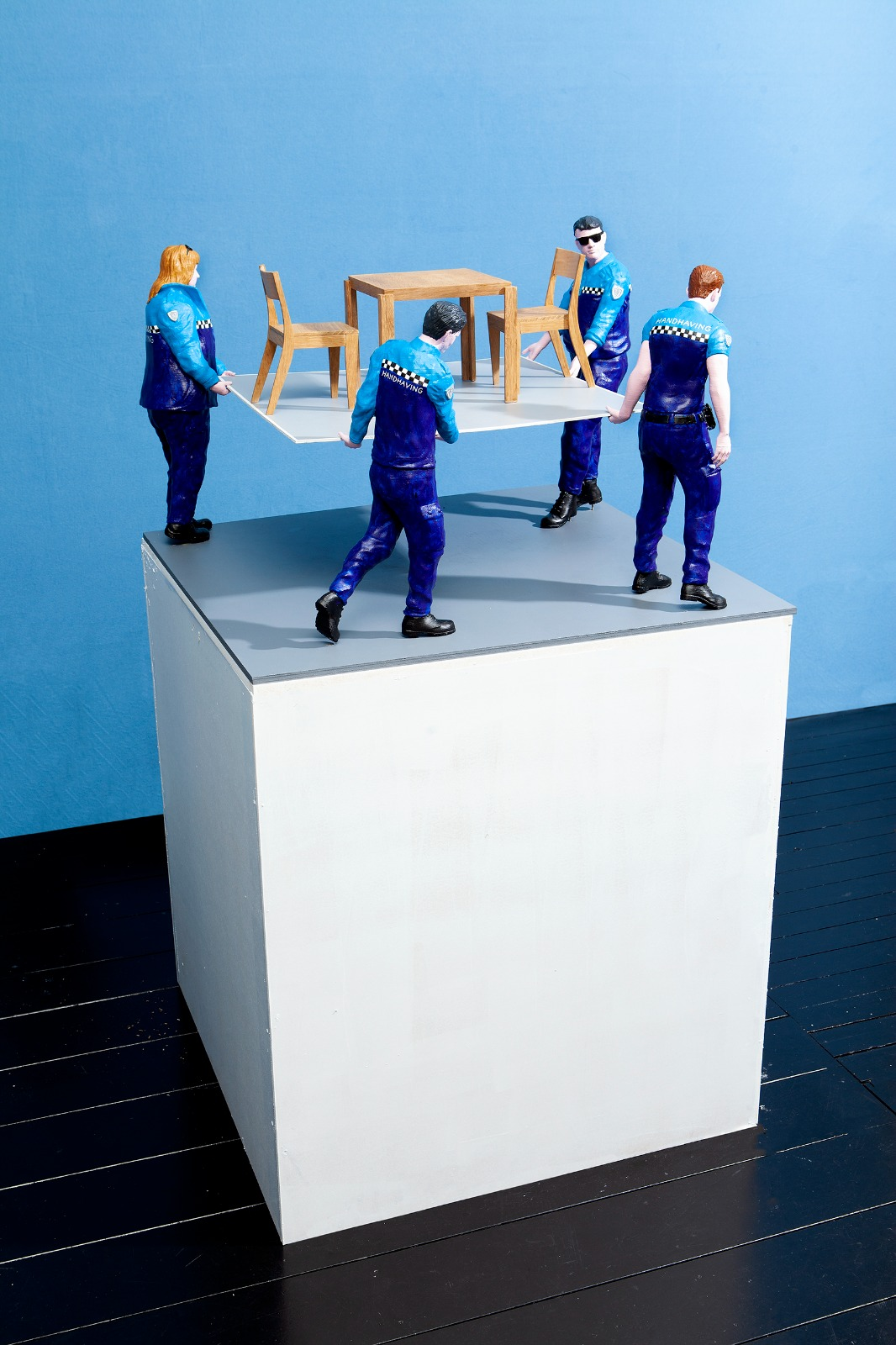
'Vastberaden' (Determined). Sculpture 3D printed and wood.

=== Loading Love Temple ===
In 2023 Dadara built the Loading Love Temple at Boom Festival in Portugal. The project is a permanent installation on the land. During the event there was also a daily performance dealing with the festival's theme of Radical Love.

In a society where we are used to show a curated version of ourselves to the outside on- and offline world, he offered the chance to accept and embrace your dark sides, fears, and insecurities of yourself and others in an act of Radical Love.

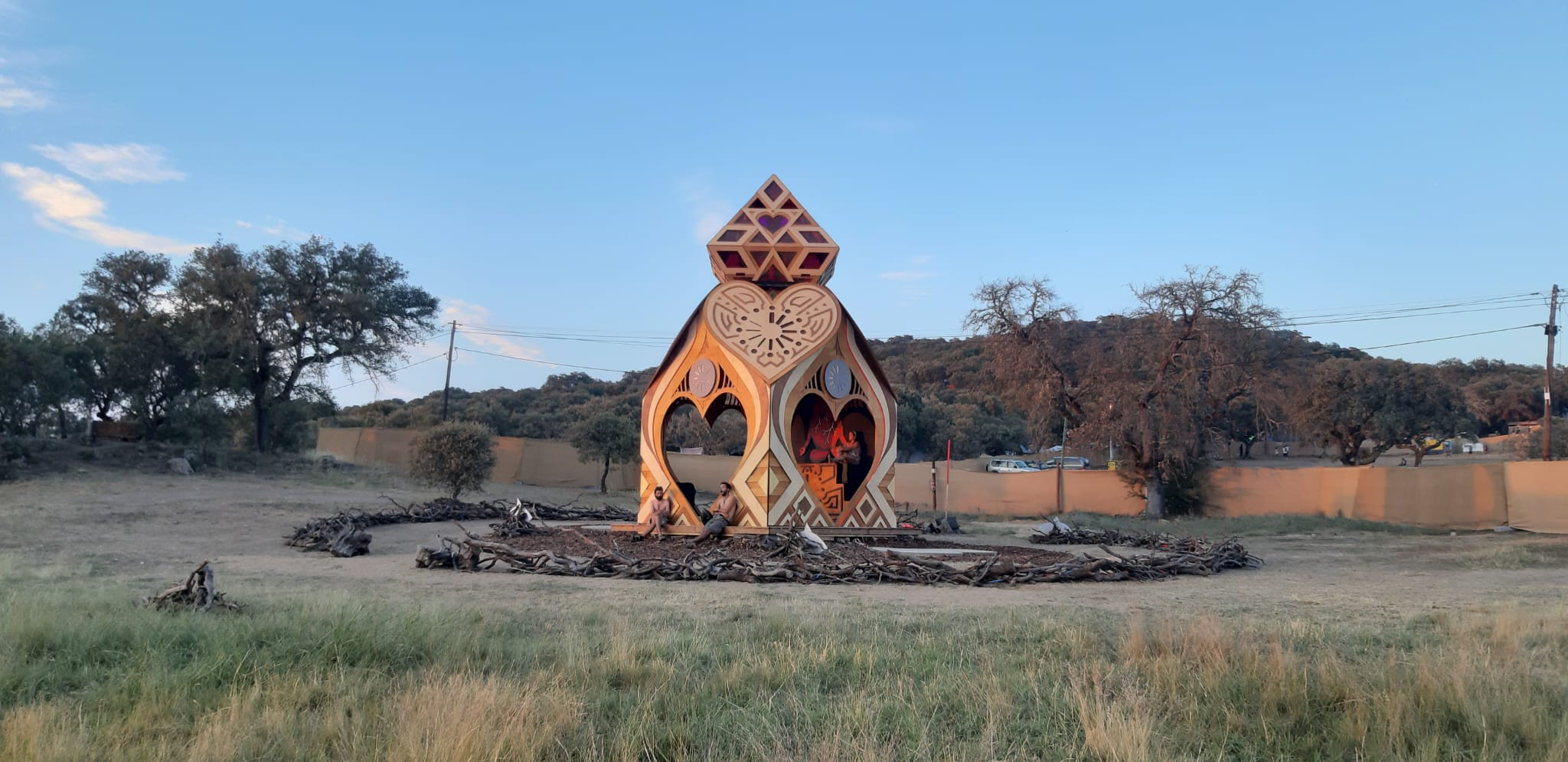
Loading Love Temple

== Books ==
=== Here for the Art ===
A hardcover edition by KochxBos Designers & Publishers, featuring 196 pages.

In ‘Here for the Art' you'll find collaborations with renowned artists such as Henk Schiffmacher, Bas Kosters, Jim Avignon, Ivana Flores, Laser 3.14, The London Police, and Daan Botlek. Explore his perspectives on the rise of Artificial intelligence, the exploration of the world of Non-fungible tokens, and the Loading Love Temple at the Boom Festival. There is a section dedicated to guerrilla projects carried out during the COVID-19 period, with the highlight being the acquisition of the work 'The Artist is not Present' by the Amsterdam Museum.

The book includes a thoughtful foreword by Merlijn Twaalfhoven - composer, author, and founder of The Turn Club.

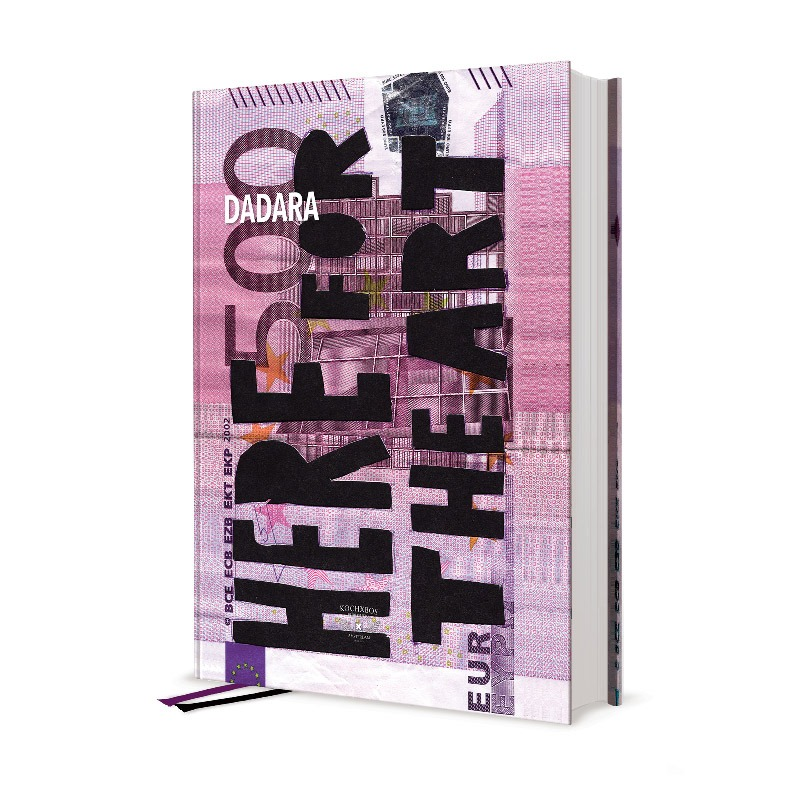
Book cover 'Here for the Art'

== See also ==
- Lamb (band)
