= Andrea Adolfati =

18th-century Italian composer

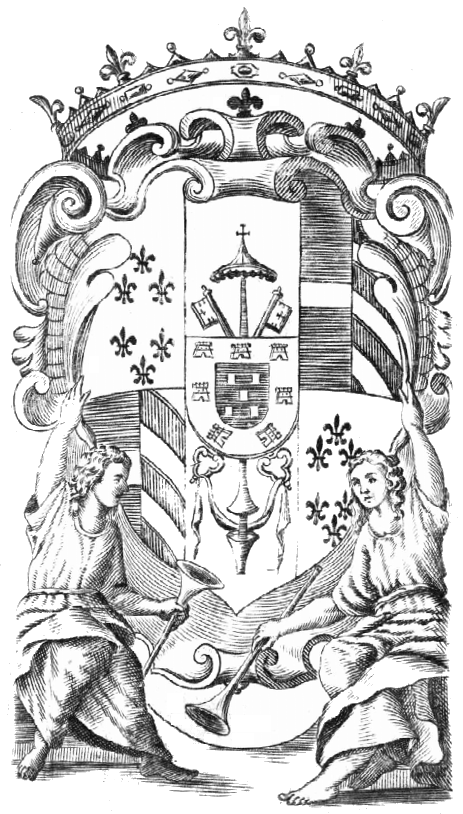
Title page of Didone abbandonata

Andrea Adolfati (1721 or 1722, Venice – 28 October 1760, Padua) was an Italian composer who is particularly remembered for his output in the opera seria genre. His works are generally conventional and stylistically similar to the operas of his teacher Baldassare Galuppi. Although his music largely followed the fashion of his time, he did compose two tunes with unusual time signatures for his day: an air in 5/4 meter and another in 7/4 meter.

Adolfati studied music composition in Venice with composer Galuppi. After completing his studies, he became the maestro di cappella at the Santa Maria della Salute, a position he held until 1745. He then worked in the same capacity at the court in Modena, where his divertimento da camera La pace fra la virtù e la bellezza premiered in 1746. Around the same time, he composed some songs and arias for Johann Adolph Hasse's Lo starnuto di Ercole, which was given at the Teatro San Girolamo (a small theatre located in the Palazzo Labia) in 1745 and during Carnival 1746.

In 1748, Adolfati became maestro di cappella at the Basilica della Santissima Annunziata del Vastato in Genoa. On 30 May 1760, he became maestro di cappella of the Padua Cathedral, succeeding Giacomo Rampini, who had died three days earlier, in that post. He remained there for only a short period, as he also died just five months later.

== Operas ==
- Artaserse (opera seria, libretto by Metastasio, 1741, Verona; in collaboration with Pietro Chiarini)
- La pace fra la virtù e la bellezza (divertimento da camera, libretto by Liborati, Metastasio, 1746, Modena)
- Didone abbandonata (dramma, libretto by Metastasio, 1747, Venice)
- Il corsaro punito (dramma giocoso, 1750, Pavia)
- Arianna (dramma, libretto by Pietro Pariati, 1750, Genoa)
- La gloria e il piacere (introduction to music on the ball, 1751, Genoa)
- Adriano in Siria (dramma, libretto by Metastasio, 1751, Genoa)
- Il giuoco dei matti (commedia per musica, 1751, Genoa)
- Ifigenia (dramma per musica, 1751, Genoa)
- Ipermestra (dramma, libretto by Metastasio, 1752, Modena)
- Vologeso (dramma, basato su Lucio Vero by Apostolo Zeno, 1752, Genoa)
- La clemenza di Tito (dramma, libretto by Metastasio, 1753, Vienna)
- Sesostri re d'Egitto (dramma, libretto by Apostolo Zeno, 1755, Genoa)

== Other works ==
- Miserere for 4 voices and instruments
- Nisi Dominus for 1 voice, basso continuo
- Laudate for 4 voices
- In exitu for 5 voices and instruments
- Domine ne in furore for 4 voices and instruments
- 6 cantatas for soprano and instruments
- Già la notte s'avvicina (text by Metastasio)
- Filen, crudo Fileno
- Perdono amata Nice (text by Metastasio)
- Ingratissimo Tirsi
- No, non turbarti, o Nice (text by Metastasio)
- Cantata for 2
- Various arias
- 6 sonatas for 2 violins, 2 flutes, 2 horns, bassoon, and contrabassoon
- Sinfonia in F major
- Overture in D major

== Sources ==
- R. Giazotto, La musica a Genova nella vita pubblica e privata dal XIII al XVIII secolo (Genoa, 1951)
- B. Brunelli, Pietro Metastasio: Tutte le opere, (Milan, 1951–1954)
- Karl Gustav Fellerer, "Thematische Verzeichnisse der fürstbischöflichen Freisingischen Hofmusik von 1796", Festschrift for Otto Erich Deutsch, pp. 296–302 (Kassel, 1963)
- S. Pintacuda, Genova, Biblioteca dell'Istituto musicale "Nicolò Paganini": catalogo (Milan, 1966)
- A. Zaggia, "La fiera delle bagatelle: il teatro musicale per marionette di San Girolamo (Venice, 1746–1748)", Rassegna veneta di studi musicali, vols. II–III, pp. 133–171 (1986–1987)
- S. Mamy, La musique à Venise et l'imaginaire français des Lumières, pp. 30–31, 175 (Paris, 1996)
- S. Hansell, C. Steffan, "Andrea Adolfati" in The New Grove Dictionary of Music and Musicians
- A. Adolfati, Sei cantate a voce sola con stromenti, prima edizione moderna a cura di Davide Mingozzi (Armelin musica, 2014)
