= Giacomo Rampini =

Italian composer

Giacomo Rampini (1680 – 27 May 1760) was an Italian composer of operas, oratorios, and sacred music.

Rampini was born and died in Padua. He was appointed the maestro di cappella of Padua Cathedral in 1704, and held the position until his death, at which time Andrea Adolfati took over the post. Two of Rampini's operas were successfully premiered at the Teatro Sant'Angelo in Venice, Armida in Damasco (17 October 1711) and La gloria trionfante d'amore (16 November 1712).

Rampini was the namesake and music instructor of his nephew, composer and organist Giacomo Rampini (died 15 November 1811), who held the post of maestro di cappella at the Udine Cathedral.
