= John Tyrrell (musicologist) =

British musicologist (1942–2018)

- Born: 17 August 1942; Salisbury, Southern Rhodesia (now Harare, Zimbabwe)
- Died: 4 October 2018 (aged 76)
- Known for: Study of Czech music, particularly biography of L. Janacek, editor of second edition of The New Grove Dictionary of Music and Musicians
- Scientific career
- Fields: Musicology, Czech studies
- Institutions: University of Cardiff

John Tyrrell (17 August 1942 – 4 October 2018) was a British musicologist. He published several books on Leoš Janáček, including an authoritative and largely definitive two-volume biography. Tyrrell was born in Salisbury, Zimbabwe and worked as a professor of music and executive editor of The New Grove Dictionary of Music and Musicians. He died in 2018, aged 76.

== Early life and education ==
Tyrrell was born in Salisbury, Southern Rhodesia (now Harare, Zimbabwe), he studied at the universities of Cape Town, Oxford and Brno. He graduated Bachelor of Music at the University of Cape Town following which he moved to the University of Oxford to pursue a doctoral degree under the supervision of Edmund Rubbra.

== Career ==
Tyrrell started his career working in an editorial capacity at The Musical Times. He was a lecturer in music at the University of Nottingham (1976), becoming Reader in Opera Studies (1987) and Professor (1996). From 1996 to 2000 he was Executive Editor of the second edition of The New Grove Dictionary of Music and Musicians (2001). From 2000 to 2008, he was research professor at Cardiff University.

He received numerous awards and honours throughout his career. In 2002, he was awarded an honorary doctorate from the Masaryk University. Then again in 2012, he was awarded another honorary doctorate by the Janáček Academy of Performing Arts, situated in Janáček's hometown of Brno. In 2018, he received the Classic Prague Award. Later that year, the Janáček Festival was also dedicated in his honour.

== Death ==
He died on the morning of 4 October 2018 at the age of 76.
