= Fear of Fours =

Studio album by Lamb
- Released: 17 May 1999
- Studio: The Toyshop (Manchester); Townhouse (London)
- Genre: Trip hop
- Length: 55:22
- Label: Fontana; Mercury
- Producer: Lamb

Lamb chronology
Lamb (1996)	Fear of Fours (1999)	What Sound (2001)

Singles from Fear of Fours
- 1. "B Line" Released: 22 March 1999; 2. "All in Your Hands" Released: 10 May 1999

Fear of Fours is the second studio album by English electronic music duo Lamb. It was released on 17 May 1999 by Fontana Records and Mercury Records.

== Background ==
The title Fear of Fours alludes to the album's avoidance of the four-on-the-floor rhythm commonly used in dance music. Lamb's Andy Barlow later explained, "By the time we came to record Fear of Fours it felt like everything in 4/4 had been done ... I've always liked interesting time signatures. When you're in 7/8, or 3/4 even, you get a loop that you've heard a hundred times before and it can immediately have a different feel to it."

== Critical reception ==
Professional ratings
Review scores
Source	Rating
AllMusic	4.5/5 stars
Entertainment Weekly	B
Los Angeles Times	3/4 stars
Melody Maker	4.5/5 stars
Mixmag	4/5
Muzik	4/5 stars
Pitchfork	8.5/10
Q	3/5 stars
Rolling Stone	3/5 stars
Spin	7/10

John Bush of AllMusic said that while Lamb's 1996 eponymous debut album "was practically a revolution in the development of a satisfactory fusion of singer/songwriter vocals and drum'n'bass", Fear of Fours "sets the bar much higher", praising Barlow in particular as "one of the most capable and inventive producers in the electronic community."

== Track listing ==
All tracks are written by Andy Barlow and Lou Rhodes, except where noted

No.	Title	Writer(s)	Length
0.	"Lullaby" (CD pregap hidden track)	Barlow; Rhodes; Jon Thorne	2:20
1.	"Soft Mistake"		3:16
2.	"Little Things"		3:18
3.	"B Line"		2:46
4.	Untitled (hidden track)		0:04
5.	"All in Your Hands"		4:39
6.	"Less Than Two"		1:19
7.	"Bonfire"		4:23
8.	"Ear Parcel"		7:54
9.	"Softly"	Barlow; Rhodes; Thorne	3:56
10.	"Here"		3:22
11.	"Fly"		5:13
12.	"Alien"		4:06
13.	"Five"		5:49
14.	"Lullaby"	Barlow; Rhodes; Thorne	2:57
Total length:			55:22

Sample credits

- "Bonfire" contains samples of C. P. E. Bach: Cello Concertos.
- "Ear Parcel" contains samples of "How High the Moon", performed by Charlie Parker.

== Personnel ==
Credits are adapted from the album's liner notes.

Lamb

- Andy Barlow – performance, brass arrangements (track 5)
- Lou Rhodes – performance

Additional musicians

- Nell Catchpole – violin (tracks 5, 7, 14), viola (tracks 5, 7, 14)
- David Clack – horn (track 5)
- Graham Clarke – violin (track 11)
- Kevin Davy – trumpet
- Tanera Dawkins – cello (tracks 5, 7, 14), string arrangements (tracks 5, 7, 14)
- Alison Dods – violin (tracks 5, 7, 14)
- Alan Gibson – double bass (tracks 5, 7, 14)
- Jimi Goodwin – guitar (track 3)
- Helen Kamminga – viola (tracks 5, 7, 14)
- Alice Kinloch – trombone (track 5), sousaphone (track 5)
- Kathryn Locke – cello (tracks 5, 7, 14), string arrangements (tracks 5, 7, 14)
- Ben Park – baritone saxophone (track 5), brass arrangements (track 5)
- John Rayson – viola (tracks 5, 7, 14)
- Cathy Rimer – cello (tracks 5, 7, 14)
- Crispin "Spry" Robinson – percussion (track 10)
- Niroshini Thambar – violin (tracks 5, 7, 14)
- Jon Thorne – double bass
- Matthew Ward – violin (tracks 5, 7, 14)
- Mikey Wilson – drums
- Anne Wood – violin (tracks 5, 7, 14)

Production

- Jim Abbiss – mixing (track 11)
- Andy Barlow – mixing (tracks 6, 13)
- Ian Carmichael – engineering, mixing (tracks 6, 10, 13)
- Alan Douglas – recording (tracks 5, 7, 14)
- Jared Hawkins – mixing (assistance)
- Lamb – production
- Al Stone – mixing

Design

- Rich Mulhearn – photography
- Jeremy Murch – photography
- Rick Myers – art direction, design

== Charts ==
Chart (1999)	Peak position
Australian Albums (ARIA)	25
Dutch Albums (Album Top 100)	61
Norwegian Albums (VG-lista)	22
Scottish Albums (OCC)	82
UK Albums (OCC)	37
UK Dance Albums (OCC)	5
US Heatseekers Albums (Billboard)	35
