= Lamb (electronic band) =

English electronic music duo

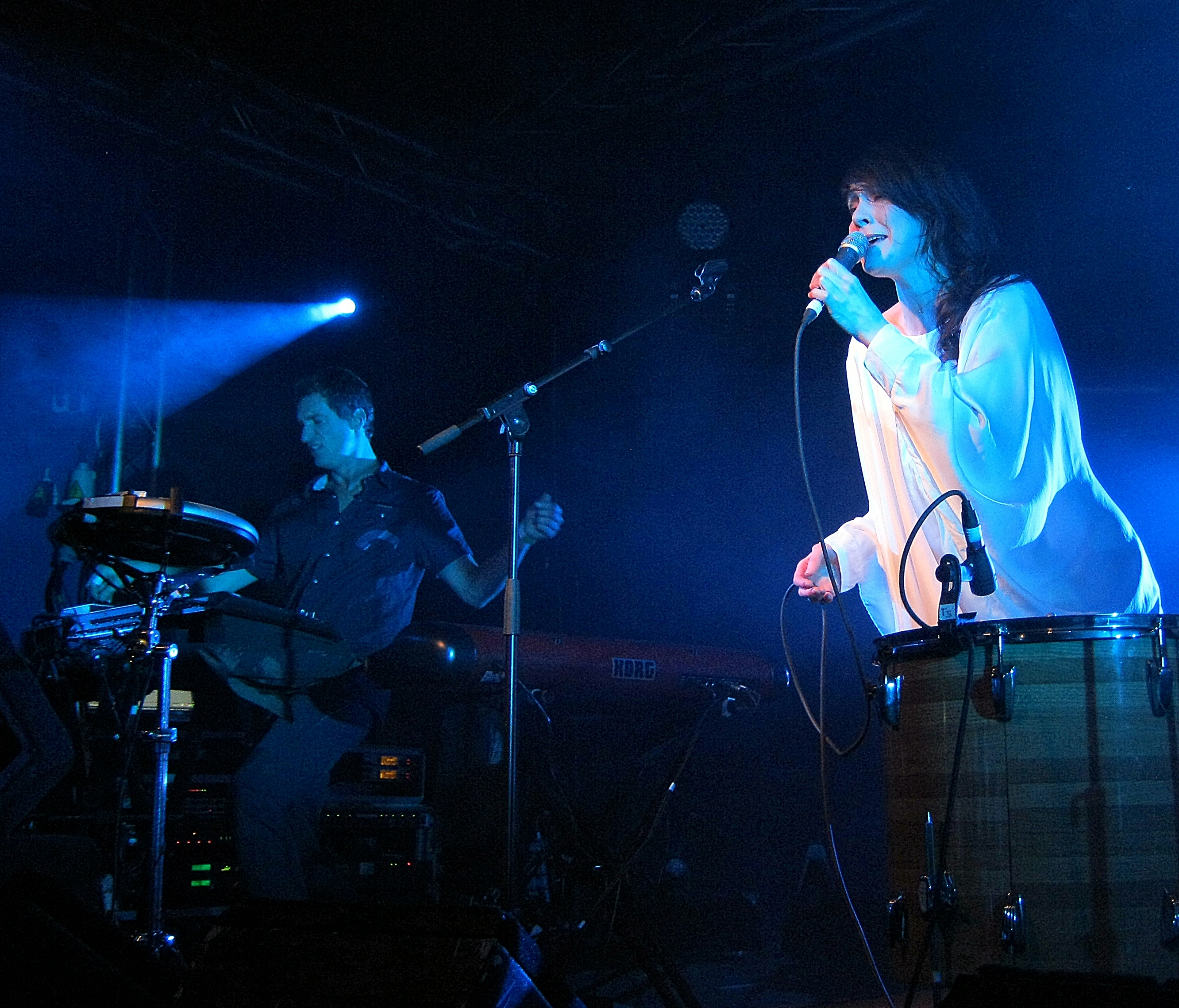
- Lamb in 2012

Background information
- Origin: Manchester, England
- Genres: Trip hop; drum and bass; folktronica
- Years active: 1996–2004, 2009–2024
- Labels: Fontana; Strata; Mercury; Koch
- Members: Andy Barlow; Lou Rhodes
- Website: lambofficial.co.uk

Lamb were an English electronic music duo from Manchester, whose music is influenced by trip hop, drum and bass and jazz. The duo consists of producer Andy Barlow and singer-songwriter Lou Rhodes. They achieved commercial success with the hit singles "Górecki" and "Gabriel".

== Biography ==
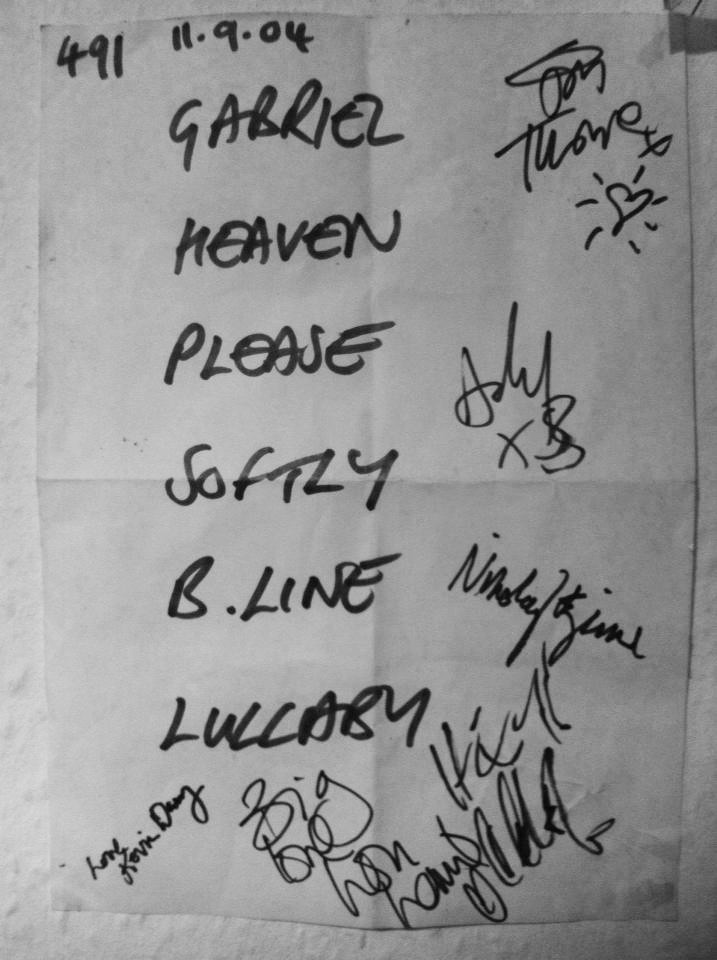
Signed set list for one of Lamb's final performances in September 2004, a secret show at the 491 Gallery in London.

On the basis of three songs, Barlow and Rhodes signed a six-album deal with Mercury Records in 1995. They released their first album, the self-titled Lamb in September 1996, and followed this up with another three albums and a cache of singles over the next eight years, culminating in the release of a greatest hits album, Best Kept Secrets, in June 2004. While they seemed destined for stardom, it seemed to evade them and during the early 2000s they lost momentum and played live only sporadically. Still, a 2004 tour produced memorable shows. Lamb performed what was billed as their final live appearance at the Paradiso in Amsterdam in September 2004 and after their 2003 album Between Darkness and Wonder both went solo. Rhodes left the music world briefly for a commune, and in 2006 released her first solo album.

Although getting their start in Manchester, Lamb are more commonly associated with the Bristol-based trip hop sound that was popular during the 1990s. As well as trip hop, their musical style is a distinctive mixture of jazz, dub, breakbeat, industrial and drum and bass, with a strong vocal element and, in their later works especially, some acoustic influences. While they were a hit phenomenon in the UK, they found limited success in other parts of the world, despite securing distribution - Portugal however was an exception - the band achieved crossover success there, including one major number one hit with "Gabriel," the lead single from 2001's What Sound.

The band produces experimental work with a distinctive production style, which includes passionate lyrical delivery. Their artistic videos draw on influences ranging from Cyberpunk through George Lucas' THX 1138 to Zen Buddhism.

By far their best-known track to date is "Górecki", from their eponymous debut album. The song is inspired by Henryk Górecki's Third Symphony, the Symphony of Sorrowful Songs. Part of the lyrics to "Górecki" were used by Baz Luhrmann for some of Satine's lines in Moulin Rouge!. The song was used in an advertisement for Guinness and an advertisement for the Tomb Raider: Underworld video game. It was also featured on the soundtrack of the 1998 film "I Still Know What You Did Last Summer". The 2004 DVD The Fall & Rise of the Fools Ark, a roadmovie by Dutch duo Dadara and Jesse for which Lamb provided the music, is an animated roadmovie in the style of Monty Python and Yellow Submarine.

== Reunion ==
During the band's hiatus, both were working on a variety of solo projects. Rhodes released her Mercury-nominated debut solo album Beloved One on her own label Infinite Bloom in 2006. This was followed by Bloom in 2008 and One Good Thing in 2010.

Barlow worked on various projects including: "Hoof" (together with Oddur Runasson, among others, who also appeared on Rhodes' solo debut) and "Luna Seeds" with vocalist–songwriter Carrie Tree. He also produced the Fink album Distance and Time. In 2011, Barlow released his first solo album as LOWB with debut album Leap and the Net will Appear issued as a limited released on Barlow's own label, Ear Parcel Recordings.

In February 2009, the organisers of The Big Chill music festival announced that Lamb would be re-forming to perform at the August 2009 event. The band subsequently announced two further appearances, at Cactus Festival and Beautiful Days Festival, and also played the Glastonbury festival and made appearances at festivals in Porto, Portugal and Prague, Czech Republic, among others. At the time, no announcement was made as to whether the band would be releasing new material, or whether the festival tour was going to be a one-off.

Later in 2009, the band announced concert dates for 2010 as well. During one of those shows, on 3 January 2010 at The Tivoli in Brisbane Australia (the 32nd gig out of an initially planned 7), Andy Barlow stated that it would be their "last gig ever, but who knows". Barlow later followed up on Lamb's Facebook fan page on 7 January, "I have a strong feeling that there will be more Lamb shows. It doesn't seem like it has reached its finale just yet".

In December 2010, the band sent another e-mail to fans, announcing the recording of their fifth album, to be titled 5. A selection of songs from the album were previewed at Playground Weekender music festival near Sydney on 20 February 2011. A special edition of the album, hand-numbered and limited to 2800 copies, could be pre-ordered through Lamb's website and was shipped to fans in May 2011, followed by the commercial release of the standard edition on 9 June in the UK. Other European countries saw slightly later release dates. '5' was released on label Strata Music.

We want to express our deepest gratitude to those of you who pre-ordered the album and, in so doing, helped make it happen. As you all know, the whole process has been, and continues to be, a self-funded operation with no record company involved and it feels so awesomely positive to have the support come from the people who'll be its audience

— lambofficial

In 2011, the band also released their first live album Live at Koko (Strata Music) as well as the long-awaited DVD Lamb Live at the Paradiso (Strata Music) recorded at the Paradiso, Amsterdam, in September 2004.

The band started a European tour to promote the new album on 19 May in Kyiv, and played further concerts and festivals throughout 2011 including a performance at London's prestigious Somerset House. In January 2012 the band started a new European tour which concluded in Paris on 18 February.

On 10 March 2014 Lamb's debut album Lamb was re-released on 180-gram green/black vinyl (for the first 1000 copies) with three bonus remixes. Later in 2014, the album What Sound is to be re-issued on vinyl with remixes.

== Backspace Unwind (2014) ==
The band's next album, Backspace Unwind, was released on 13 October 2014 (Strata/Butler Records) in four formats. The first single, "We Fall in Love", released on 6 October 2014, was announced by Q Magazine on 8 September, and received an exclusive preview as its Track of the Day. The single also received the award for Best Chillout/Lounge Track at the International Dance Music Awards 2015.

Previews of other songs from the album, including a live demo of "As Satellites Go By" were also released on the band's website and social media channels. For Record Store Day 2015, the band released a limited edition 10" red vinyl featuring two tracks previously unreleased on vinyl.

Lamb undertook a UK, European, and Australian/New Zealand tour from October 2014 through 2015.

== Lamb 21st Anniversary Tour ==
The band undertook a European tour in late 2017 to commemorate the 21st anniversary of the release of their first album, billed as "Twenty-One", which included a double-set concert at Manchester Cathedral which was recorded live in its entirety. All who attended the Manchester concert were given a free copy of the double CD album, burned on the night and autographed by both band members, which bore no identifying details or information on the content beyond the band's logo. The tour concluded with an extra date at the historical GDR Funkhaus in Berlin.

== The Secret of Letting Go (2019) ==
The band's seventh and final studio album, The Secret of Letting Go, was written and recorded in the space of a year, split between their home-studio in England's South Downs, and in India and Ibiza. Billed to be as experimental as previous albums, the title track, “The Secret of Letting Go,” was written at a time that the band decided they were splitting up.

== Solo projects ==
Alongside touring, Rhodes and Barlow continued to work on solo projects.

Rhodes has released four solo albums: the Mercury-nominated Beloved One (2006), Bloom (2007), One Good Thing (2010) and theyesandeye in 2016.

In 2013 Barlow's debut solo album as LOWB, Leap and the Net Will Appear was re-released on a new label, Distiller Records, with additional tracks and new artwork. In May 2013 LOWB appeared live on BBC Radio 2's Dermot O'Leary show and played a live band show at The Great Escape Festival in Brighton. Andy also continued to work as a producer, producing and co-writing Dismantle and Rebuild the debut album from Bristol band The Ramona Flowers. Most recently, he produced and mixed David Gray's album Mutineers (released June 2014), co-writing a number of tracks.

Rhodes branched out too becoming a published author with children's picture book The Phlunk (2012 Strata Books) illustrated by Tori Elliott. On 27 April 2014 signed, limited edition, pre-release copies of the follow-up The Phlunk's Worldwide Symphony went on sale at the band's store (official publication date 22 May 2014).

== Members ==
=== Current members ===
- Andy Barlow – production, songwriting, keyboards, programming, percussion, bass, turntables (1996–2004, 2009–present)
- Lou Rhodes – vocals, guitar, bass, songwriting, programming (1996–2004, 2009–present)

=== Current touring members ===
- Jon Thorne – electric/acoustic bass (1996–2004, 2009–present)
- Nikolaj Bjerre – drums (1996–2004, 2009–present)
- Quinta – violin, viola (2017–present)
- Danny Lohner – acoustic/electric guitar, effects, samples (2009–present)
- Kevin Davy – trumpet, flugelhorn, pocket trumpet (1996–2000, 2004, 2017–present)

=== Former touring members ===
- Oddur Runarsson – acoustic/electric guitar (1996–2004)
- Pauline Kirke – cello (2004)
- Liz Liew – violin (2004)
- Sarah Liew – violin (2004)

== Discography ==
=== Studio albums ===
1996	Lamb: Released: 1996, 2014 (re-issue); Label: Fontana, Music on Vinyl (re-issue); Formats: CD, LP, Double LP (reissue); Chart Peak UK No. 109
1999	Fear of Fours: Released: 1999; Label: Fontana, Mercury; Formats: CD, Double LP; Chart Peak UK No. 37, AU No. 25, NL No. 61, NOR No. 22
2001	What Sound: Released: 2001; Label: Mercury; Formats: CD, Double LP, DI; Chart Peak UK No. 54, AU No. 40, BEL No. 16, GER No. 87, NL No. 65, PT No. 2
2003	Between Darkness and Wonder: Released: 2003; Label: Mercury; Formats: CD, LP, DI; Chart Peak UK No. 96, AU No. 59, BEL No. 20, CH No. 82, PT No. 13
2011	5: Released: 2011; Label: Lamb, Strata; Formats: CD, Double LP, DI; Chart Peak BEL No. 51
2014	Backspace Unwind: Released: 13 October 2014; Label: Strata, Butler; Formats: CD, Limited-edition double CD, Vinyl, DI; Chart Peak UK No. 112, BEL (Vl) No. 44, BEL (Wa) No. 93, NL No. 46
2019	The Secret of Letting Go: Released: 26 April 2019; Label: Cooking Vinyl; Formats: CD, Vinyl, Limited-edition Vinyl, DI, Cassette

=== Compilation albums ===
- 2004 Best Kept Secrets: The Best of Lamb 1996–2004 (Universal)
  - UK No. 111; AU No. 65, BEL No. 24
- 2005 Lamb Remixed (Mercury/Universal)

=== Live albums ===
- 2011 Live at Koko Strata
- 2012 Live at the Paradiso (2004)
- 2017 Live at Manchester Cathedral

=== Singles ===
==== from Lamb ====
- 1996 "Cotton Wool"
  - UK No. 76
- 1996 "Gold"
  - UK No. 132
- 1996 "God Bless"
  - UK No. 92
- 1997 "Górecki"
  - UK No. 30

==== from Fear of Fours ====
- 1999 "B Line"
  - UK No. 52
- 1999 "All in Your Hands"
  - UK No. 71
- 1999 "Softly"

==== from What Sound ====
- 2001 "Gabriel"
  - AU No. 95, PT No. 1
- 2002 "Sweet"

==== from Between Darkness and Wonder ====
- 2004 "Wonder"
  - UK No. 81

==== from 5 ====
- 2011 "Build a Fire"
- 2012 "Butterfly Effect"

==== from Backspace Unwind ====
- 2014 "We Fall in Love"
- 2015 "In Binary"
- 2015 "What Makes Us Human"

==== from The Secret of Letting Go ====
- 2017 "Illumina"
- 2019 "Armageddon Waits"

=== DVDs ===
- 2004 The Fall & Rise of the Fools Ark (with Dadara and Jesse)
- 2011 Live at the Paradiso (recorded 2004) Strata Music
