= Andy Barlow (producer) =

British music producer and musician

- Genres: Electronic, trip hop
- Occupations: Composer, musician, producer
- Labels: BMG / Skint Records, Distiller Records
- Formerly of: Lamb

Andy Barlow is a British record producer and musician best known for his work as a founding member of the band Lamb.

== Biography ==
Later in life, during a hiatus from Lamb, Barlow released solo work as Hip Optimist and LOWB.

His debut album as LOWB, Leap and the Net Will Appear, was re-released by Distiller Records with additional tracks, new artwork and the EP Inward Outburst in 2013. LOWB performed live on BBC Radio 2's Dermot O'Leary show and at The Great Escape Festival in Brighton.

Barlow has collaborated with and remixed other artists including Damien Rice, Elbow, and Placebo, produced and co-wrote Dismantle and Rebuild with The Ramona Flowers, produced and mixed David Gray's Mutineers and produced five songs on U2's Songs of Experience.

== Discography ==
Hip Optimist

- Anafey (BMG. Skint Records, 1996)

LOWB

- Leap and the Net Will Appear (Planet Imports, 2011/Distiller Records, 2013)

Lamb
