= 1999 in music =

This is a list of some notable events in music that took place in 1999.

== Specific locations ==
- 1999 in British music
- 1999 in Norwegian music
- 1999 in Scandinavian music
- 1999 in South Korean music

== Specific genres ==
- 1999 in classical music
- 1999 in country music
- 1999 in heavy metal music
- 1999 in hip-hop
- 1999 in jazz
- 1999 in Latin music
- 1999 in progressive rock

== Events ==
=== January ===
- January 7
  - After eight years of marriage, musician husband Rod Stewart and supermodel wife Rachel Hunter announce their separation.
  - Paul McCartney attends the launch of his daughter Heather's first housewares collection in Georgia.
- January 11 – During the American Music Awards, Billy Joel is awarded the Special Award of Merit for his "inspired songwriting skills" and "exciting showmanship."
- January 12
  - Britney Spears releases her hit album ...Baby One More Time. The album is the second best-selling album of the 90s in the US and the third best-selling album of the 90s worldwide. It also enters the list of the top 20 best-selling albums of all time.
  - Fredrik Johansson is fired from Dark Tranquillity.
- January 15–31 – After a short hiatus in 1998, the Big Day Out festival returns to Australia and New Zealand, headlined by Hole and Marilyn Manson.
- January 21 – A&M Records is shut down and merged into the Universal Music Group umbrella label Interscope Geffen A&M. It would be relaunched in 2007.
- January 22 – German industrial band KMFDM announces that it has disbanded.
- January 28 – Kirk Franklin performs at the Baltimore Arena in Baltimore, Maryland for the video recording of "The Nu Nation Tour" featuring CeCe Winans, Trin-i-Tee 5:7 and Crystal Lewis
- January 30 – Britney Spears' hit album and single ...Baby One More Time both hit number one on the Billboard Charts. This is her first album (and song) to achieve this. The album spent 6 weeks on number 1 and a total of 103 weeks on the Billboard 200 Charts. It's number 16 on the Billboard list "Best Female Albums of all time" and number 41 on the Billboard list "Best Albums of all time". The single "...Baby One More Time" spent 2 consecutive weeks on number one on the Billboard Hot 100 and a total of 32 weeks on that same list.

=== February ===
- February 9 – NSYNC release their third single from their debut album, "(God Must Have Spent) A Little More Time on You", which peaks in the top 10 on the Pop charts.
- February 10 – Iron Maiden announces that singer Bruce Dickinson and guitarist Adrian Smith have rejoined the band.
- February 14 – Elton John appears as himself in a special episode of the animated series The Simpsons.
- February 15 – "Rolling Stones Day" is declared in Minnesota by Governor (and former Rolling Stones bodyguard) Jesse Ventura.
- February 19 – Marilyn Manson files a defamation countersuit against former Spin Magazine editor Craig Marks, in response to a multimillion-dollar lawsuit that Marks filed in January against the singer, the record label Nothing/Interscope, and Manson's bodyguard agency.
- February 22 – In Los Angeles, California, Stevie Wonder is honored as the 1999 MusiCares Person of the Year.
- February 23 – Eminem releases his second studio album and major-label debut, The Slim Shady LP. It debuts at number two on the Billboard 200, selling over 200,000 copies in its first week. It remains on the Billboard 200 for 100 weeks.
- February 24 – At the 1999 Grammy Awards, Lauryn Hill becomes the first female artist to win five Grammys in one night.
- February 25 – The Artist Formerly Known as Prince files a lawsuit against nine Web sites for copyright and trademark infringement, claiming that the websites sell bootlegged recordings and offer unauthorized song downloads.

=== March ===
- March 1 – Sony Music Distribution raises wholesale prices on audio compact discs by 8 US cents.
- March 2
  - Cher's song "Believe" reaches number one on the Billboard Hot 100, making Cher the oldest female artist (at the age of 52) to perform this feat. Cher also set the record for the longest hit-making career span, with 33 years between the release of her first and last Billboard Hot 100 #1 singles (1965 and 1999).
  - The House of Blues in Paradise, Nevada at the Mandalay Bay Resort. Bob Dylan performs a concert at the club and is joined by U2's lead singer Bono for an encore of "Knockin' on Heaven's Door".
- March 5 – Trauma Records files a $40 million breach-of-contract lawsuit against the members of Bush for failing to deliver a new album.
- March 6 – A 67-year-old George Jones is seriously injured in a car accident while on his way home. Jones' Lexus crashed into a bridge at about 1:30 p.m. It is later revealed that alcohol was a factor in the accident.
- March 15 – Marilyn Manson is injured when he slips and falls during a concert at the Great Western Forum in Inglewood, California. Manson's performance is cut short.
- March 16 – The Recording Industry Association of America introduces a new certification level, Diamond, for albums or singles selling ten million units.
- March 17 – Namie Amuro's mother Emiko Taira is murdered.
- March 21 – Irish girl band B*Witched score their fourth consecutive #1 with "Blame It On The Weatherman" on the UK singles chart. They become the first band to have all their first four singles enter at the top simultaneously and set a new record. It is broken a year later by Irish boy band Westlife.
- March 23 – Green Day release "Nice Guys Finish Last", the lead track as well as the fourth and final single off their 1997 album Nimrod, and was their last single to be released in the 20th century.
- March 27 – The Bee Gees end their One Night Only tour in Sydney, Australia.

=== April ===
- April 10 – A charity tribute, the Concert for Linda McCartney is held at the Royal Albert Hall in London. Here, There and Everywhere: A Concert For Linda, features performances by Paul McCartney, Chrissie Hynde of the Pretenders, Elvis Costello, Sinéad O'Connor, and George Michael. Proceeds raised at the event went to animal rights causes.
- April 13 – Faith Hill and LeAnn Rimes at the VH1 Divas.
- April 19 – Neil Young performs at Madison Square Garden in New York City. Due to a mistake by a Madison Square Garden staff member, the marquee read "Bob Dylan, Tonight at 8pm". Young jokingly introduced one of his guitar players as Bob Dylan during the show.
- April 20
  - Billy Joel performs at Meadowlands in New Jersey. Joel announces that this would be his last public pop music concert. Joel also announces plans on devoting his future efforts to classical music.
  - The Columbine High School massacre takes place in Jefferson County, Colorado, sparking a widespread moral panic that ultimately tries to place the blame on violent media, including music perceived to be violent and/or connected to the goth culture. American rocker Marilyn Manson receives the brunt of the blame despite evidence that neither of the shooters were fans of his. Manson then withdraws, only to address the issue in the form of his fourth studio album. The finger is also pointed at German industrial metal acts Rammstein and KMFDM, of whom the shooters were fans. This sensationalism gradually wanes in the years following, and all three music acts ironically achieve more mainstream acceptance in the U.S. than they had prior to the massacre. Christian Contemporary Music artists respond to the concept that Atheism caused the shooting and in particular the Cassie Bernall urban legend (about a girl who was initially believed to have been shot in the head for answering "yes" when perpetrator Eric Harris asked her if she believed in God) with songs such as "A New Hope" by Five Iron Frenzy, about a band member's sister who had been trapped in the choir room returning to school after the shooting, and "This Is Your Time" by Michael W. Smith, a direct response to the Cassie Bernall story.
- April 26 – Musician and former bandleader of The Sound, Adrian Borland, commits suicide in London.
- April 28 – Tom Petty and the Heartbreakers receive a star on the Hollywood Walk of Fame.
- April 30 – Columbine High School massacre: Aerosmith visits Columbine High School shooting victim Lance Kirklin in a Colorado hospital before a concert in Denver, Colorado. Kirklin was one of 24 wounded in the April 20 shooting, 13 others were killed.

=== May ===
- May 1
  - "The Paintings of Paul McCartney" exhibit opens at the Lyz Art Forum in Siegen, Germany. The exhibit features around 70 paintings by the former Beatle.
  - Musical group Atari Teenage Riot starts a riot in Berlin with their anti-consumer and anti-government lyrics.
- May 18
  - The Backstreet Boys release their third studio album Millennium both in the US and internationally.
- May 29 – The 44th Eurovision Song Contest, held at the International Convention Center in Jerusalem, is won by Swedish singer Charlotte Nilsson with the song "Take Me to Your Heaven".

=== June ===
- June 1
  - Peer-to-peer file sharing network Napster is launched.
  - Blink-182 release their third studio album Enema of the State, which debuted at #9 on the Billboard 200, skyrocketing the band into mainstream success and spearheading a second wave of pop-punk.
- June 2 – The Backstreet Boys smash the old first-week sales record of Garth Brooks' 1.08 million, with Millennium, which sold over 1.13 million in its first week and was the first album to sell over 500,000 copies at least 2 weeks. The album holds at No. 1 first-weeks sales record of the 1990s.
- June 13 – S Club 7 debut at #1 on the UK singles chart with their first single "Bring It All Back" and become the largest vocal group to enter at the top.
- June 22
  - Christina Aguilera releases "Genie in a Bottle", which becomes a worldwide hit, selling over seven million copies.
  - Limp Bizkit's second album, Significant Other, debuts at number one on the Billboard 200, with 643,874 copies sold in its first week. The album launches them into mainstream success.
- June 25 - Michael Jackson MJ & Friends Concerts in 1999, with numerous other performers as well. The purpose of the tour was to raise funds for children in Kosovo, Africa & elsewhere. Jackson gave two concerts during the tour. The first one took place in Seoul, South Korea on June 25 & the second one was in Munich, Germany June 27.
- June 28 – Britney Spears embarks on her first concert tour, ...Baby One More Time Tour. The tour only reached North America and garnered a positive review, but generated some controversy due to her racy outfit and accusation of lip syncing.
- June 29
  - Santana and Matchbox Twenty vocalist Rob Thomas release "Smooth", which peaks at #1 for 12 weeks.
  - Razor and Tie releases the single-disc version of Monster Ballads. It would eventually be certified platinum at the end of the year.

=== July ===
- July 1 – The new Scottish Parliament is formally opened with a rock concert in the shadow of Edinburgh Castle and is headlined by Garbage, whose lead singer Shirley Manson is at the time one of the biggest music stars from Scotland.
- July 3 – Indie rock icon Mark Sandman collapses on stage at the Giardini del Principe in Palestrina, Latium, Italy (near Rome) while performing with Morphine. He is soon pronounced dead of a heart attack at the age of 46. Morphine immediately disbands.
- July 8 – Adrian Erlandsson quits The Haunted as the drummer while the band hires Per Möller Jensen as Erlandsson's replacement.
- July 12 – Gregg Alexander issues a press release dissolving the New Radicals.
- July 13–18 – The third Yoyo A Go Go punk and indie rock festival opens in Olympia, Washington.
- July 20 – Powerman 5000 release their second studio album Tonight the Stars Revolt!
- July 22–25 – The highly anticipated Woodstock 99 festival takes place in Rome, New York. Performers include the Red Hot Chili Peppers, Korn, Kid Rock, Limp Bizkit, Rage Against the Machine, DMX, James Brown, and Jamiroquai.

=== August ===
- August 14–15 – The Artist Formerly Known as Prince holds a weekend yard sale at his Paisley Park Studios, with part of the proceeds going to benefit underprivileged youth.
- August 24 – Christina Aguilera releases her self titled debut album. It will become one of the best selling albums of the year and sell over 14 million copies.
- August 27–29 – The third Terrastock festival is held in London.
- August 31 – Megadeth release eighth studio album Risk.

=== September ===
- September 1 – The Irish Music Hall of Fame opens; Van Morrison is the first inducted into the museum.
- September 9 – The MTV Video Music Awards of 1999 take place. Britney Spears has the most memorable performance of the event, performing her hit single "...Baby One More Time"; NSYNC joined her with their song "Tearin' Up My Heart".
- September 14 – Nu-Metal Band Dope Release their debut studio album Felons and Revolutionaries.
- September 17 – Rapper Eminem is sued by his mother for $10 million, claiming that public comments he made about her were slanderous and had caused emotional stress and financial harm. She eventually collects a mere $1,600 settlement in 2001.
- September 21 – David Bowie's twenty-first studio album Hours becomes the first complete album by a major artist legally available to download over the Internet, preceding the physical release by two weeks.
- September 28 – Creed releases their second studio album Human Clay. The album debuted No. 1 on the Billboard 200.
- September 30 – Billboard announces that Ministry of Sound Recordings Ltd is expanding into Australia after ending a partnership with MDS Dancenet and establishes Ministry of Sound Australia, known until 2005 as Ministry of Sound (UK) Pty Ltd. Ministry UK also secures a distribution deal with EMI Music Group Australasia Pty Ltd.

=== October ===
- October 9
  - "Heartbreaker", the lead single from Mariah Carey's seventh studio album, Rainbow, reaches #1 on the Billboard 100, becoming her 14th #1 single and also her 59th week atop the chart. When it stayed at #1 for a further week Carey surpassed The Beatles for the act with the most weeks spent at number one. The song also topped charts in Canada and New Zealand.
  - The first Coachella Valley Music and Arts Festival is held in California. The inaugural line-up consists of Beck, The Chemical Brothers, Tool, Morrissey and Rage Against the Machine.
  - The anti-poverty initiative NetAid is launched with simultaneous benefit concerts in London, New Jersey and Geneva.
- October 19 – 98 Degrees release their first Christmas album This Christmas.
- October 20 – Melissa Auf der Maur leaves Hole.

=== November ===
- November 5
  - Australian independent record label Liberation Music is formed.
  - Gary Cherone leaves Van Halen.
- November 11 – Toploader release their debut studio album, Onka's Big Moka.
- November 12 – 1970s rock star Gary Glitter is jailed for four months for downloading child pornography off the Internet.
- November 15 – Korn performs their entire album Issues at the Apollo Theater in New York City, becoming the first rock band ever to perform at the Apollo.
- November 16
  - Korn's fourth studio album, Issues, debuts at number 1 on the Billboard 200 with 575,000 copies sold in its first week.
- November 23 – Michael W. Smith release their ninth studio album This Is Your Time.
  - University of Oregon student Jeffrey Levy, having downloaded MP3s without permission, is the first person convicted for copyright infringement under the NET Act of 1997. He is sentenced to two years of probation and a limit on Internet access.

=== December ===
- December 4 – The Spice Girls start their Christmas Tour around the UK, dubbed as the Christmas in Spiceworld Tour.
- December 14
  - BMI announces the most played songs on American radio and television in the 20th century BMI Announces Top 100 Songs of the Century (full list)
  - Paul McCartney returns to The Cavern Club to play a special concert for 300 fans.
  - Boy George is injured by a 62-pound disco ball that falls from a concert venue's ceiling during a rehearsal, nearly killing him as it almost landed on his head.
- December 27 – Puff Daddy and fellow rapper Shyne are arrested for weapons violations and other charges after a shooting in a Manhattan nightclub that leaves three people injured.
- December 30 – George Harrison survives a knife attack by an intruder in his Friar Park home.
- December 31 – Many special New Year's Eve concerts are held around the world to celebrate the arrival of the year 2000. Big shows include Barbra Streisand at The MGM Grand Las Vegas, The Eagles at the Staples Center in Los Angeles, Billy Joel at Madison Square Garden, and Metallica with Kid Rock and Ted Nugent playing for 54,000 the Pontiac Silverdome. The biggest concert that night is by Phish, however, playing for 75,000 people at the Big Cypress Indian Reservation in Florida.

=== Unknown ===
- Vocalist Lawrence Mackrory quits Darkane. The band hires by Andreas Sydow as his replacement after.

== Bands formed ==
- See Musical groups established in 1999

== Bands reformed ==
- The Animals

== Bands disbanded ==
- See Musical groups disestablished in 1999

== Albums released ==
=== January–March ===
Date		Album	Artist	Notes
J A N U A R Y	1	A Song for ××	Ayumi Hamasaki	Debut
J A N U A R Y	4	Headshots: Se7en	Atmosphere	-
J A N U A R Y	5	In Your Area	Hawkwind	-
J A N U A R Y	8	Grieg: Piano Concerto; Peer Gynt Suites 1 & 2	Gothenburg Symphony Orchestra	-
J A N U A R Y	11	Hawkwind 1997	Hawkwind	Live
J A N U A R Y	11	Unification	Iron Savior	-
J A N U A R Y	12	14:59	Sugar Ray	-
J A N U A R Y	12	...Baby One More Time	Britney Spears	Debut
J A N U A R Y	12	By Your Side	The Black Crowes	-
J A N U A R Y	12	Knock Knock	Smog	-
J A N U A R Y	19	I See a Darkness	Bonnie "Prince" Billy	-
J A N U A R Y	19	Live at Luther College	Dave Matthews & Tim Reynolds	Live
J A N U A R Y	19	Made Man	Silkk the Shocker	-
J A N U A R Y	19	Up Up Up Up Up Up	Ani DiFranco	-
J A N U A R Y	25	1999	Cassius	-
J A N U A R Y	25	Theater of Salvation	Edguy	-
J A N U A R Y	26	Apocalypse Dudes	Turbonegro	-
J A N U A R Y	26	Chyna Doll	Foxy Brown	-
J A N U A R Y	26	Colin James and the Little Big Band II	Colin James	-
J A N U A R Y	26	Dreaming Neon Black	Nevermore	-
J A N U A R Y	26	Moontower	Dan Swanö	-
J A N U A R Y	26	Unnatural Selection	Flotsam and Jetsam	-
J A N U A R Y	29	Science Fiction	blackmail	-
F E B R U A R Y	1	Dialogue	Four Tet	-
F E B R U A R Y	1	Speed of Sound	Anvil	-
F E B R U A R Y	2	Extremely Cool	Chuck E. Weiss	-
F E B R U A R Y	2	Jerusalem	Sleep	-
F E B R U A R Y	2	Keep It Like a Secret	Built to Spill	-
F E B R U A R Y	2	Rushmore: Original Motion Picture Soundtrack	Various Artists	Soundtrack
F E B R U A R Y	2	X-Ray Sierra	Tom Cochrane	-
F E B R U A R Y	9	Dosage	Collective Soul	-
F E B R U A R Y	9	Hedwig and the Angry Inch Original Cast Album	Cast of Hedwig and the Angry Inch	Original cast recording
F E B R U A R Y	9	Rare & Fatty	Bad Manners	Compilation
F E B R U A R Y	9	Sam Prekop	Sam Prekop	-
F E B R U A R Y	9	Trio II	Dolly Parton, Emmylou Harris and Linda Ronstadt	-
F E B R U A R Y	14	Alone I Admire	Auburn Lull	-
F E B R U A R Y	15	No Exit	Blondie	-
F E B R U A R Y	15	Anima Animus	The Creatures	-
F E B R U A R Y	16	Da Next Level	Mr. Serv-On	-
F E B R U A R Y	16	Greatest Hits	New Kids on the Block	Compilation
F E B R U A R Y	17	Eien	Zard	-
F E B R U A R Y	19	The '90s Suck and So Do You	Angry Samoans	-
F E B R U A R Y	19	Eatin' Dust	Fu Manchu	-
F E B R U A R Y	22	The Dirtchamber Sessions Volume One	The Prodigy	Compilation
F E B R U A R Y	22	Have a Nice Day	Roxette	Europe
F E B R U A R Y	22	At the Heart of Winter	Immortal	-
F E B R U A R Y	22	Rusted Angel	Darkane	-
F E B R U A R Y	23	ALL	ALL	EP
F E B R U A R Y	23	Blue Plate Specials Live	The Specials	Live
F E B R U A R Y	23	Call to Arms	Sick of It All	-
F E B R U A R Y	23	Can You Still Feel?	Jason Falkner	-
F E B R U A R Y	23	Clarity	Jimmy Eat World	-
F E B R U A R Y	23	FanMail	TLC	-
F E B R U A R Y	23	February Son	Oleander	-
F E B R U A R Y	23	The Hot Rock	Sleater-Kinney	-
F E B R U A R Y	23	Live at the Fillmore East	Jimi Hendrix	Live
F E B R U A R Y	23	The Mountain	Steve Earle and the Del McCoury Band	-
F E B R U A R Y	23	A Place in the Sun	Lit	-
F E B R U A R Y	23	A Prince Among Thieves	Prince Paul	-
F E B R U A R Y	23	The Sebadoh	Sebadoh	-
F E B R U A R Y	23	The Slim Shady LP	Eminem	LP
F E B R U A R Y	23	Suicaine Gratifaction	Paul Westerberg	-
F E B R U A R Y	23	Things Fall Apart	The Roots	-
F E B R U A R Y	23	War Zone	Black Moon	-
F E B R U A R Y	23	What I Deserve	Kelly Willis	-
F E B R U A R Y	24	Dance Classics of Chaka Khan	Chaka Khan	Compilation
F E B R U A R Y	24	Muzai Moratorium	Ringo Sheena	Debut
F E B R U A R Y	25	Eureka	Jim O'Rourke	-
F E B R U A R Y	25	Four-Day Trials	Dispatch	-
F E B R U A R Y	26	Mindfields	Toto	Europe
F E B R U A R Y	27	Volume 1	CKY	-
F E B R U A R Y	?	Rain, Steam and Speed	The Mutton Birds	-
M A R C H	1	Beaucoup Fish	Underworld	-
M A R C H	1	Budakhan Mindphone	Squarepusher	-
M A R C H	1	Live and Enhanced	Tonic	Live
M A R C H	1	Revelations	Gene	-
M A R C H	2	Always Never the Same	George Strait	-
M A R C H	2	Everywhere We Go	Kenny Chesney	-
M A R C H	2	Reich Remixed	Steve Reich	Remix
M A R C H	2	Spiritual Black Dimensions	Dimmu Borgir	-
M A R C H	2	Universal Madness	Madness	Live
M A R C H	2	Apple Venus Volume 1	XTC	-
M A R C H	8	Live at the Hardback	Hot Water Music	Live
M A R C H	8	Neon Ballroom	Silverchair	-
M A R C H	8	Peasants, Pigs & Astronauts	Kula Shaker	-
M A R C H	8	Performance and Cocktails	Stereophonics	-
M A R C H	8	Back on Top	Van Morrison	-
M A R C H	8	Slow Riot for New Zerø Kanada	Godspeed You! Black Emperor	EP
M A R C H	9	Bossalinie	C-Murder	-
M A R C H	9	Central Reservation	Beth Orton	-
M A R C H	9	Everything Louder Than Everyone Else	Motörhead	Live
M A R C H	9	Eye II Eye	Scorpions	-
M A R C H	9	Fuse	Joe Henry	-
M A R C H	9	The Gang's All Here	Dropkick Murphys	-
M A R C H	9	Gedida	Natacha Atlas	-
M A R C H	9	If I Could Turn Back Time: Cher's Greatest Hits	Cher	Compilation
M A R C H	9	The Movement	Harlem World	-
M A R C H	9	Pistolero	Frank Black and the Catholics	-
M A R C H	9	Ravenous	Damon Albarn and Michael Nyman	Soundtrack
M A R C H	9	Summerteeth	Wilco	-
M A R C H	10	First Love	Hikaru Utada	-
M A R C H	10	Jump Up	Supercar	-
M A R C H	15	13	Blur	-
M A R C H	15	Axxess & Ace	Songs: Ohia	-
M A R C H	16	100% Ginuwine	Ginuwine	-
M A R C H	16	Burning London: The Clash Tribute	Various Artists	Tribute
M A R C H	16	The Ideal Crash	Deus	-
M A R C H	16	Libido	Buck-O-Nine	-
M A R C H	16	Shades 1968–1998	Deep Purple	Box Set
M A R C H	16	Stay the Same	Joe McIntyre	Solo debut
M A R C H	16	Who Else!	Jeff Beck	-
M A R C H	22	Stupid Dream	Porcupine Tree	-
M A R C H	22	Post Orgasmic Chill	Skunk Anansie	-
M A R C H	22	Social Dancing	Bis	-
M A R C H	22	Brand New Second Hand	Roots Manuva	-
M A R C H	22	Windowlicker	Aphex Twin	EP
M A R C H	23	@#!*	Pulley	-
M A R C H	23	Black Foliage: Animation Music Volume One	The Olivia Tremor Control	-
M A R C H	23	The N.W.A Legacy, Vol. 1: 1988–1998	N.W.A	-
M A R C H	23	Caledonia	Shana Morrison	Solo Debut
M A R C H	23	Elton John and Tim Rice's Aida	Elton John	Concept/soundtrack
M A R C H	23	Finally	Blackstreet	-
M A R C H	23	Foolish soundtrack	Various Artists	Soundtrack
M A R C H	23	Give Yourself a Hand	Crash Test Dummies	-
M A R C H	23	Hempstead High	A+	-
M A R C H	23	Instrument Soundtrack	Fugazi	Soundtrack
M A R C H	23	Live	Usher	Live
M A R C H	23	New Way to Be Human	Switchfoot	-
M A R C H	23	The 'Original' Bad Co. Anthology	Bad Company	Compilation +4 new songs
M A R C H	23	Owsley	Owsley	Debut
M A R C H	23	Red Voodoo	Sammy Hagar	-
M A R C H	23	Savage Land	Mob Rules	-
M A R C H	23	Strange Behaviour	Duran Duran	Remix Compilation
M A R C H	23	Super Hits	Brooks & Dunn	Compilation
M A R C H	23	Tonight	Silk	-
M A R C H	23	Traveling Miles	Cassandra Wilson	-
M A R C H	23	Wisconsin Death Trip	Static-X	-
M A R C H	29	Come on Die Young	Mogwai	UK
M A R C H	29	Under the Influence	Status Quo	-
M A R C H	29	Now That's What I Call Music! 42 (UK series)	Various Artists	Compilation
M A R C H	29	Power Plant	Gamma Ray	-
M A R C H	29	Tuonela	Amorphis	-
M A R C H	30	Go: Music from the Motion Picture	Various Artists	Soundtrack
M A R C H	30	The Matrix: Music from the Motion Picture	Various Artists	Soundtrack
M A R C H	30	No Gods, No Managers	Choking Victim	-
M A R C H	30	The PJs: Music from & Inspired by the Hit Television Series	Various Artists	TV Soundtrack
M A R C H	30	Secret Name	Low	-

=== April–June ===
Date		Album	Artist	Notes
A P R I L	5	What Are You Going to Do with Your Life?	Echo & the Bunnymen	-
A P R I L	5	The Middle of Nowhere	Orbital	-
A P R I L	6	15 Minutes	Nik Kershaw	-
A P R I L	6	Buckcherry	Buckcherry	-
A P R I L	6	Heated	Big Sugar	US
A P R I L	6	Music from The Adventures of Pete & Pete	Polaris	TV Soundtrack
A P R I L	6	I Am...	Nas	-
A P R I L	6	Jordan Knight	Jordan Knight	Solo debut
A P R I L	6	Sogno	Andrea Bocelli	-
A P R I L	6	Throttle Junkies	Soil	-
A P R I L	6	Thug Mentality 1999	Krayzie Bone	-
A P R I L	6	Utopia Parkway	Fountains of Wayne	-
A P R I L	6	We Kill Everything	Gwar	-
A P R I L	7	Innamoramento	Mylène Farmer	-
A P R I L	12	Carboot Soul	Nightmares on Wax	-
A P R I L	12	Equally Cursed and Blessed	Catatonia	-
A P R I L	12	Rides	Reef	-
A P R I L	13	18 Tracks	Bruce Springsteen	Compilation
A P R I L	13	Blue Skies, Broken Hearts...Next 12 Exits	The Ataris	-
A P R I L	13	Dysfunction	Staind	-
A P R I L	13	Burn the Priest	Burn the Priest	band changed name to Lamb of God
A P R I L	13	Echo	Tom Petty and the Heartbreakers	-
A P R I L	13	I've Got a Right to Cry	Mandy Barnett	-
A P R I L	13	Karma	Rick Springfield	-
A P R I L	13	Love Songs	Yanni	Compilation
A P R I L	13	Tal Bachman	Tal Bachman	-
A P R I L	19	Bury the Hatchet	The Cranberries	-
A P R I L	20	Adios	KMFDM	-
A P R I L	20	Avant Hard	Add N to (X)	-
A P R I L	20	Chopper City in the Ghetto	B.G.	-
A P R I L	20	The Earth Pressed Flat	10,000 Maniacs	-
A P R I L	20	Endorama	Kreator	-
A P R I L	20	4 Nights at the Palais Royale	Sloan	Live
A P R I L	20	Greatest Hits 1984–1987	Reggie and the Full Effect	-
A P R I L	20	Holy Roller	The Reverend Horton Heat	Compilation
A P R I L	20	The Life and Crimes of Alice Cooper	Alice Cooper	Box Set
A P R I L	20	Look Now Look Again	Rainer Maria	-
A P R I L	20	Monsters and Robots	Buckethead	-
A P R I L	20	Mule Variations	Tom Waits	-
A P R I L	20	Six	Mansun	US
A P R I L	20	Snuffbox Immanence	Ghost	-
A P R I L	20	Street Faërie	Cree Summer	-
A P R I L	20	Tight	Mindless Self Indulgence	-
A P R I L	20	Tune In, Turn On, Free Tibet	Ghost	-
A P R I L	23	Miami	Babasónicos	-
A P R I L	26	Fantômas	Fantômas	-
A P R I L	26	Hatebreeder	Children of Bodom	-
A P R I L	26	Movin' Melodies	ATB	Debut
A P R I L	26	Propaganda	The Sound	-
A P R I L	26	Sixpence None the Richer	Sixpence None the Richer	Re-release
A P R I L	26	Twisted Tenderness	Electronic	-
A P R I L	27	Black Sails EP	AFI	EP
A P R I L	27	Implode	Front Line Assembly	-
A P R I L	27	Nineteen Naughty Nine: Nature's Fury	Naughty by Nature	-
A P R I L	27	Playing My Game	Lene Marlin	-
A P R I L	27	Songs from Dawson's Creek	Various Artists	TV Soundtrack
A P R I L	27	Soundbombing II	Various Artists	Compilation
A P R I L	27	Suge Knight Represents: Chronic 2000	Various Artists	-
A P R I L	27	Take Your Shoes Off	Robert Cray	-
A P R I L	27	This Is Normal	GusGus	-
A P R I L	27	The Unauthorized Biography of Reinhold Messner	Ben Folds Five	-
A P R I L	?	The Collection	Spandau Ballet	Reissue
A P R I L	?	T.O.P.	Shinhwa	-
A P R I L	?	I Am Shelby Lynne	Shelby Lynne	
M A Y	3	Head Music	Suede	-
M A Y	4	Crashes to Light, Minutes to Its Fall	Cul de Sac	-
M A Y	4	The Ego Has Landed	Robbie Williams	Compilation
M A Y	4	First Come, First Served	Kool Keith	As Dr. Dooom
M A Y	4	Every Day Is a New Day	Diana Ross	-
M A Y	4	A Place in the Sun	Tim McGraw	-
M A Y	4	Point No. 1	Chevelle	Debut
M A Y	4	The Matrix: Original Motion Picture Score	Don Davis	Soundtrack
M A Y	4	Sonic Brew	Black Label Society	-
M A Y	4	Times of Grace	Neurosis	-
M A Y	4	Undeniable	Raven-Symoné	-
M A Y	4	The Warriors EP	P.O.D.	EP
M A Y	10	Ghosts of Dead Aeroplanes	Prolapse	-
M A Y	10	The Hush	Texas	-
M A Y	10	Remedy	Basement Jaxx	UK
M A Y	11	60 Second Wipe Out	Atari Teenage Riot	-
M A Y	11	I'd Rather Eat Glass	Bijou Phillips	-
M A Y	11	No Limit Top Dogg	Snoop Dogg	-
M A Y	11	Pizza Deliverance	Drive-By Truckers	-
M A Y	11	Ricky Martin	Ricky Martin	-
M A Y	11	The Whole SHeBANG	SHeDAISY	-
M A Y	14	Intimités	Miss Kittin & The Hacker	EP
M A Y	17	Fear of Fours	Lamb	-
M A Y	17	Grande Rock	The Hellacopters	-
M A Y	17	The Maggot	Melvins	-
M A Y	17	The Only Reason I Feel Secure	Pedro the Lion	EP
M A Y	17	Play	Moby	-
M A Y	17	Us and Them	Godflesh	-
M A Y	18	Bigger than the Devil	Stormtroopers of Death	-
M A Y	18	Black Sails in the Sunset	AFI	-
M A Y	18	Fellow Workers	Utah Phillips and Ani DiFranco	-
M A Y	18	Freedumb	Suicidal Tendencies	-
M A Y	18	Helldorado	W.A.S.P.	-
M A Y	18	If Looks Could Kill, I'd Watch You Die	Death By Stereo	-
M A Y	18	Millennium	Backstreet Boys	-
M A Y	18	Seven	Wolfstone	-
M A Y	18	Thug Ride	White Dawg	-
M A Y	18	Whereabouts	Ron Sexsmith	-
M A Y	21	Colony	In Flames	-
M A Y	21	Stairway to Fairyland	Freedom Call	-
M A Y	24	Beach House on the Moon	Jimmy Buffett	-
M A Y	24	Darkdancer	Les Rythmes Digitales	-
M A Y	24	Guitars	Mike Oldfield	-
M A Y	24	Host	Paradise Lost	-
M A Y	24	The Man Who	Travis	-
M A Y	24	Saltwater	Chicane	-
M A Y	24	Skydancer	Dark Tranquillity	Reissue
M A Y	24	Vertigo	Groove Armada	-
M A Y	25	A New Kind of Army	Anti-Flag	-
M A Y	25	The Amazing Jeckel Brothers	Insane Clown Posse	-
M A Y	25	The Art of Storytelling	Slick Rick	-
M A Y	25	Buck Jump	Dirty Dozen Brass Band	-
M A Y	25	Last Wave Rockers	Common Rider	Debut
M A Y	25	Of Sculptured Ivy and Stone Flowers	Novembers Doom	-
M A Y	25	This Moment Is Mine	Chanté Moore	-
M A Y	25	You Can't Stop the Bum Rush	Len	-
M A Y	31	Code Red	Sodom	-
M A Y	31	Mike + The Mechanics	Mike + The Mechanics	-
M A Y	?	Hybrid Theory	Linkin Park	Debut/EP
M A Y	?	¡Viva El Amor!	The Pretenders	-
J U N E	1	1011 Woodland	The Fixx	-
J U N E	1	Austin Powers: The Spy Who Shagged Me – Music from the Motion Picture	Various Artists	Soundtrack
J U N E	1	Barefoot on the Beach	Michael Franks	-
J U N E	1	Blaque	Blaque	-
J U N E	1	Da Crime Family	TRU	-
J U N E	1	Enema of the State	blink-182	-
J U N E	1	Gorgeous	Guttermouth	-
J U N E	1	Here Comes the Bride	Spin Doctors	-
J U N E	1	No Angel	Dido	-
J U N E	1	Panda Bear	Panda Bear	Debut
J U N E	1	Shrinking Violet	L.A. Guns	-
J U N E	1	Straight Ahead	Pennywise	-
J U N E	1	Venni Vetti Vecci	Ja Rule	-
J U N E	1	Who Needs Pictures	Brad Paisley	Debut
J U N E	2	In Stereo	Bomfunk MC's	Debut
J U N E	3	The Siket Disc	Phish	Internet
J U N E	6	Live & More Encore	Donna Summer	-
J U N E	6	Face Down	Serial Joe	-
J U N E	7	Schizophonic	Geri Halliwell	Solo Debut
J U N E	7	Crowning of Atlantis	Therion	-
J U N E	7	Keep It Unreal	Mr. Scruff	-
J U N E	7	Leisure Noise	Gay Dad	-
J U N E	7	Surrender	Chemical Brothers	-
J U N E	8	Astro Lounge	Smash Mouth	-
J U N E	8	Buena Vista Social Club Presents Ibrahim Ferrer	Ibrahim Ferrer	-
J U N E	8	Californication	Red Hot Chili Peppers	-
J U N E	8	Dark Side of the Spoon	Ministry	-
J U N E	8	Euphoria	Def Leppard	-
J U N E	8	The Gathering	Testament	-
J U N E	8	Get Skintight	The Donnas	-
J U N E	8	Her Wallpaper Reverie	The Apples in Stereo	-
J U N E	8	In a Reverie	Lacuna Coil	-
J U N E	8	A Man's Not a Camel	Frenzal Rhomb	-
J U N E	8	New World Disorder	Biohazard	-
J U N E	8	Stereo * Type A	Cibo Matto	-
J U N E	8	Synkronized	Jamiroquai	-
J U N E	8	Terror Twilight	Pavement	-
J U N E	8	Triptych	The Tea Party	-
J U N E	8	When I Look in Your Eyes	Diana Krall	-
J U N E	10	Songs from the Heart	Yanni	Compilation
J U N E	12	Ágætis byrjun	Sigur Rós	Iceland
J U N E	14	Guerrilla	Super Furry Animals	-
J U N E	15	702	702	-
J U N E	15	Double Up	Mase	-
J U N E	15	Erase the Slate	Dokken	-
J U N E	15	Everything You Want	Vertical Horizon	-
J U N E	15	Heavy	Heavy D	-
J U N E	15	Liquid Tension Experiment 2	Liquid Tension Experiment	-
J U N E	15	Messenger	Edwin McCain	-
J U N E	15	Mirrorball	Sarah McLachlan	Live
J U N E	15	No Boundaries: A Benefit for the Kosovar Refugees	Various Artists	-
J U N E	15	Revolution	Sister Machine Gun	-
J U N E	15	Supernatural	Santana	-
J U N E	15	This or That	Sway & King Tech	-
J U N E	15	The White Stripes	The White Stripes	Debut
J U N E	21	The Beta Band	The Beta Band	UK
J U N E	21	Beware the Heavens	Sinergy	-
J U N E	21	H.M.S. Fable	Shack	-
J U N E	21	Judgement	Anathema	-
J U N E	22	South Park: Bigger, Longer & Uncut – Music from and Inspired by the Motion Picture	Various Artists	Soundtrack
J U N E	22	A2G	Blackalicious	EP
J U N E	22	Da Real World	Missy "Misdemeanor" Elliott	-
J U N E	22	Hypocrisy	Hypocrisy	-
J U N E	22	It's Real	K-Ci & JoJo	-
J U N E	22	Laced	Reveille	Debut
J U N E	22	New Ancient Strings	Toumani Diabaté with Ballaké Sissoko	-
J U N E	22	Paintin' the Town Brown: Ween Live 1990–1998	Ween	Live
J U N E	22	Punk-O-Rama Vol. 4	Various Artists	Compilation
J U N E	22	The RZA Hits	RZA	Compilation
J U N E	22	The Soft Bulletin	The Flaming Lips	-
J U N E	22	Significant Other	Limp Bizkit	-
J U N E	22	Tuesday's Child	Amanda Marshall	-
J U N E	28	Classics in the Key of G	Kenny G	Covers album
J U N E	29	Beneath the Surface	GZA	-
J U N E	29	Brave New World	Styx	-
J U N E	29	Electric Honey	Luscious Jackson	-
J U N E	29	Freaks of Nature	Drain STH	-
J U N E	29	Mercedes 5 and Dime	Moist	Canada
J U N E	29	No Mercy No Remorse	RBX	-
J U N E	29	Nothing Safe: Best of the Box	Alice in Chains	Compilation
J U N E	29	One Guitar, No Vocals	Leo Kottke	-
J U N E	29	Running with Scissors	"Weird Al" Yankovic	-
J U N E	29	Slipknot	Slipknot	Debut
J U N E	29	Soundpieces: Da Antidote	Lootpack	-
J U N E	29	Supersonic and Demonic Relics	Mötley Crüe	Rarities Compilation

=== July–September ===
Date		Album	Artist	Notes
J U L Y	1	Ark	L'Arc-en-Ciel	-
J U L Y	1	Ray	L'Arc-en-Ciel	-
J U L Y	5	On How Life Is	Macy Gray	UK
J U L Y	5	How I Learned to Love the Bootboys	The Auteurs	-
J U L Y	5	Black the Sun	Alex Lloyd	-
J U L Y	6	Can't Get There from Here	Great White	-
J U L Y	6	The Golden Band	The American Analog Set	-
J U L Y	6	Live at Woodstock	Jimi Hendrix	Live
J U L Y	6	Ratt	Ratt	-
J U L Y	6	Street Life	Fiend	-
J U L Y	7	Engine	Loudness	-
J U L Y	7	Fun 9	Takako Minekawa	-
J U L Y	12	Before The Calm	Witness	UK; Debut album
J U L Y	12	The Fidelity Wars	Hefner	
J U L Y	13	Blue Green Orange	I Mother Earth	-
J U L Y	13	Breakfast with Girls	Self	-
J U L Y	13	California	Mr. Bungle	-
J U L Y	13	Can't Stay Away	Too $hort	-
J U L Y	13	Fenix*TX	Fenix*TX	-
J U L Y	13	Full Clip: A Decade of Gang Starr	Gang Starr	Compilation
J U L Y	13	Night and Day	Willie Nelson	-
J U L Y	13	Someday	Yanni	Compilation
J U L Y	13	The Wonderful World of Cease A Leo	Lil' Cease	-
J U L Y	14	Brotherhood	B'z	-
J U L Y	19	Long Tall Weekend	They Might Be Giants	Internet
J U L Y	19	Now That's What I Call Music! 43 (UK series)	Various Artists	Compilation
J U L Y	20	Burning Bridges	Arch Enemy	-
J U L Y	20	Jewels for Sophia	Robyn Hitchcock	-
J U L Y	20	Life of the Party	The Planet Smashers	-
J U L Y	20	Sky Motel	Kristin Hersh	-
J U L Y	20	There's a Poison Goin' On	Public Enemy	-
J U L Y	20	This Time	Los Lobos	-
J U L Y	20	Timbre	Sophie B. Hawkins	-
J U L Y	20	Tonight the Stars Revolt!	Powerman 5000	-
J U L Y	20	Without Condition	Ginny Owens	Debut
J U L Y	20	Where We Stand	Yellowcard	-
J U L Y	23	School Girl Distortional Addict	Number Girl	-
J U L Y	23	Watoosh!	Pezz	Later changed name to Billy Talent
J U L Y	27	Alive in Athens	Iced Earth	Live
J U L Y	27	At the Show	MxPx	Live
J U L Y	27	The Blues	Eric Clapton	Compilation
J U L Y	27	A Cheap and Evil Girl	Bree Sharp	Debut
J U L Y	27	Guerrilla Warfare	Hot Boys	-
J U L Y	27	Ignorance Is Bliss	Face to Face	-
J U L Y	27	Jaws of Death	Primal Fear	-
J U L Y	27	Now That's What I Call Music! 2 (US series)	Various Artists	Compilation
J U L Y	27	Peculiar Situation	Earl Klugh	-
J U L Y	27	Staying Power	Barry White	-
J U L Y	27	'Til the Medicine Takes	Widespread Panic	-
J U L Y	27	Vaya	At the Drive-In	EP
J U L Y	27	The Verve Pipe	The Verve Pipe	-
J U L Y	27	The Writing's On The Wall	Destiny's Child	US
J U L Y	29	The Melancholy Collection	Millencolin	Sweden; Compilation
J U L Y	30	Get Over It	Mr. Big	Japanese release date
J U L Y	?	Act of Depression	Underoath	-
J U L Y	?	Trepanation	American Head Charge	-
A U G U S T	3	Awesome Mix Tape vol. 6	The Pietasters	-
A U G U S T	3	Coming of Age	Memphis Bleek	-
A U G U S T	3	Detroit Rock City: Music from the Motion Picture	Various Artists	Soundtrack
A U G U S T	3	Do the Collapse	Guided by Voices	-
A U G U S T	3	Fly the Flag	Down by Law	-
A U G U S T	3	Forget About It	Alison Krauss	-
A U G U S T	3	Here I Stand	Oysterband	-
A U G U S T	3	Philadelphonic	G. Love & Special Sauce	-
A U G U S T	3	The Process of Self-Development	Candiria	-
A U G U S T	4	Transistor	TNT	Japanese release date
A U G U S T	9	Satanica	Behemoth	-
A U G U S T	10	Black Elvis/Lost in Space	Kool Keith	-
A U G U S T	10	Brand New Year	The Bottle Rockets	-
A U G U S T	10	The Burning Red	Machine Head	-
A U G U S T	10	Come Pick Me Up	Superchunk	-
A U G U S T	10	Edge of Forever	Lynyrd Skynyrd	-
A U G U S T	10	Liberate Te Ex Inferis	Zao	-
A U G U S T	10	The Most Beautifullest Hits	Keith Murray	Compilation
A U G U S T	10	No Division	Hot Water Music	-
A U G U S T	10	Violator: The Album	Various Artists	-
A U G U S T	16	Juxtapose	Tricky	-
A U G U S T	16	Où est la Rock?	Fireball Ministry	-
A U G U S T	17	Before You Were Punk 2	Various Artists	Compilation
A U G U S T	17	Incognegro	Ludacris	-
A U G U S T	17	Mary	Mary J. Blige	-
A U G U S T	17	Murda Muzik	Mobb Deep	-
A U G U S T	17	Rough Harvest	John Mellencamp	-
A U G U S T	17	Steal the Sky	Yanni	Soundtrack
A U G U S T	17	Teenage Snuff Film	Rowland S. Howard	-
A U G U S T	17	The 10 Year Limited Edition Anniversary Box Set	Blur	Box set
A U G U S T	21	Whiteout	Boss Hog	-
A U G U S T	23	The Bootlicker	Melvins	-
A U G U S T	23	J-Tull Dot Com	Jethro Tull	-
A U G U S T	23	Soulburner	Gardenian	-
A U G U S T	24	The Austin Sessions	Kris Kristofferson	-
A U G U S T	24	Underground Vol. 2: Club Memphis	Three 6 Mafia	-
A U G U S T	24	Bitter	Meshell Ndegeocello	-
A U G U S T	24	Bring Your Own Stereo	Jimmie's Chicken Shack	-
A U G U S T	24	Calling Rastafari	Burning Spear	-
A U G U S T	24	Christina Aguilera	Christina Aguilera	Debut
A U G U S T	24	Forever	Puff Daddy	-
A U G U S T	24	The Fundamental Elements of Southtown	P.O.D.	-
A U G U S T	24	Home	Sevendust	-
A U G U S T	24	LFO	LFO	-
A U G U S T	24	A Little Bit of Mambo	Lou Bega	-
A U G U S T	24	Melvin Flynt – Da Hustler	Noreaga	-
A U G U S T	24	Mock Tudor	Richard Thompson	-
A U G U S T	24	Monarch (Lay Your Jewelled Head Down)	Feist	-
A U G U S T	24	The Muse	Elton John	Soundtrack
A U G U S T	24	Oh! The Grandeur	Andrew Bird's Bowl of Fire	-
A U G U S T	24	Programmed	Innerzone Orchestra	-
A U G U S T	24	Slap-Happy	L7	-
A U G U S T	24	Time	Third Day	-
A U G U S T	24	Title of Record	Filter	-
A U G U S T	24	The Vault: Old Friends 4 Sale	Prince	Compilation
A U G U S T	24	Western Wall: The Tucson Sessions	Linda Ronstadt and Emmylou Harris	-
A U G U S T	27	Au cœur du stade	Celine Dion	Live
A U G U S T	27	Big River	Troy Cassar-Daley	-
A U G U S T	30	The Abba Generation	A*Teens	Sweden
A U G U S T	30	A Secret History... The Best of the Divine Comedy	The Divine Comedy	Compilation
A U G U S T	30	Industrial Silence	Madrugada	Debut
A U G U S T	30	Nia	Blackalicious	Debut
A U G U S T	30	Yesterday Went Too Soon	Feeder	-
A U G U S T	31	Days of the New	Days of the New	2nd album
A U G U S T	31	Fly	The Chicks	-
A U G U S T	31	Greatest Hits	SWV	Compilation
A U G U S T	31	Live aus Berlin	Rammstein	Live
A U G U S T	31	The M-Pire Shrikez Back	O.G.C.	-
A U G U S T	31	Risk	Megadeth	-
A U G U S T	31	Sound Asleep	Evanescence	EP
A U G U S T	31	Tonight's Decision	Katatonia	-
A U G U S T	31	Vitamin C	Vitamin C	-
A U G U S T	?	Kulanjan	Taj Mahal and Toumani Diabaté	-
A U G U S T	?	Reaching to the Converted	Billy Bragg	-
S E P T E M B E R	2	The Avenger	Amon Amarth	-
S E P T E M B E R	6	Gettin' High on Your Own Supply	Apollo 440	UK
S E P T E M B E R	6	The Time Machine	Alan Parsons	-
S E P T E M B E R	6	Showbiz	Muse	UK; Debut album
S E P T E M B E R	6	Stereolab	The Free Design	EP
S E P T E M B E R	6	Beyond the Veil	Tristania	-
S E P T E M B E R	6	Only Yazoo	Yazoo	Compilation
S E P T E M B E R	7	69 Love Songs	The Magnetic Fields	Box Set
S E P T E M B E R	7	August Everywhere	Blinker the Star	-
S E P T E M B E R	7	Chamber Music	Coal Chamber	-
S E P T E M B E R	7	Field Studies	Quasi	-
S E P T E M B E R	7	Modern	Buzzcocks	-
S E P T E M B E R	7	Nasty Little Thoughts	Stroke 9	-
S E P T E M B E R	7	One Part Lullaby	The Folk Implosion	-
S E P T E M B E R	7	Riot, Riot, Upstart	Agnostic Front	-
S E P T E M B E R	7	Risin' Outlaw	Hank Williams III	Solo Debut
S E P T E M B E R	7	Seven Year Itch: 1982–1989	Platinum Blonde	Compilation
S E P T E M B E R	7	Somewhere Between Heaven and Earth	Cindy Bullens	-
S E P T E M B E R	7	The Ultra Zone	Steve Vai	-
S E P T E M B E R	7	Veterans of Disorder	Royal Trux	-
S E P T E M B E R	7	Zygote	John Popper	-
S E P T E M B E R	13	Beyond Skin	Nitin Sawhney	-
S E P T E M B E R	13	The Contino Sessions	Death in Vegas	-
S E P T E M B E R	13	Liquid Skin	Gomez	-
S E P T E M B E R	13	One From The Modern	Ocean Colour Scene	-
S E P T E M B E R	13	Sang pour sang	Johnny Hallyday	-
S E P T E M B E R	13	Wide Angle	Hybrid	-
S E P T E M B E R	13	Yellow Submarine Songtrack	The Beatles	Soundtrack
S E P T E M B E R	14	Afterglow	Dot Allison	Solo Debut
S E P T E M B E R	14	Amarte Es Un Placer	Luis Miguel	-
S E P T E M B E R	14	American Football	American Football	-
S E P T E M B E R	14	Avenue B	Iggy Pop	-
S E P T E M B E R	14	Beautiful Midnight	Matthew Good Band	-
S E P T E M B E R	14	Breakfast in New Orleans, Dinner in Timbuktu	Bruce Cockburn	-
S E P T E M B E R	14	The Dust Bowl Symphony	Nanci Griffith	-
S E P T E M B E R	14	Felons and Revolutionaries	Dope	Debut
S E P T E M B E R	14	Good Old Boys	John Hartford	-
S E P T E M B E R	14	I'm Not So Tough	Mindy McCready	-
S E P T E M B E R	14	Marc Anthony	Marc Anthony	English-language debut
S E P T E M B E R	14	Nigga Please	Ol' Dirty Bastard	-
S E P T E M B E R	14	Pick Up	Solex	-
S E P T E M B E R	14	Q2K	Queensrÿche	-
S E P T E M B E R	14	Ruff Ryders' First Lady	Eve	-
S E P T E M B E R	14	She Talks to Rainbows	Ronnie Spector	-
S E P T E M B E R	14	A Single History: 1991–1997	Unwound	Compilation
S E P T E M B E R	14	Winter Light	Yanni	Compilation
S E P T E M B E R	17	As Friends Rust	As Friends Rust	EP
S E P T E M B E R	20	The Ladder	Yes	-
S E P T E M B E R	20	Metalhead	Saxon	-
S E P T E M B E R	20	Supergrass	Supergrass	-
S E P T E M B E R	20	1999 Remixes	Jamiroquai	Remix compilation
S E P T E M B E R	20	Blazing the Crop	Rae & Christian	Compilation
S E P T E M B E R	21	Back at One	Brian McKnight	-
S E P T E M B E R	21	Burn to Shine	Ben Harper and the Innocent Criminals	-
S E P T E M B E R	21	Cobra and Phases Group Play Voltage in the Milky Night	Stereolab	-
S E P T E M B E R	21	Euphoria Morning	Chris Cornell	-
S E P T E M B E R	21	The Fragile	Nine Inch Nails	-
S E P T E M B E R	21	Between the Bridges	Sloan	-
S E P T E M B E R	21	Going for Gold	Shed Seven	Compilation
S E P T E M B E R	21	The Greatest Hits – Volume 1	The Beach Boys	Compilation
S E P T E M B E R	21	The Greatest Hits – Volume 2	The Beach Boys	Compilation
S E P T E M B E R	21	Happiness... Is Not a Fish That You Can Catch	Our Lady Peace	Canada
S E P T E M B E R	21	Hey You	Jack Ingram	-
S E P T E M B E R	21	Hours	David Bowie	-
S E P T E M B E R	21	I'll Take Care Of You	Mark Lanegan	-
S E P T E M B E R	21	Live at the Wiltern	CPR	Live
S E P T E M B E R	21	A Love Like Ours	Barbra Streisand	-
S E P T E M B E R	21	Stan and Judy's Kid	Adam Sandler	-
S E P T E M B E R	21	The Sweetest Punch	Elvis Costello and Bill Frisell	-
S E P T E M B E R	21	Terror Squad: The Album	Terror Squad	Debut
S E P T E M B E R	21	Tightrope	Brooks & Dunn	-
S E P T E M B E R	21	To Venus and Back	Tori Amos	Double Album: 1 Studio, 1 Live
S E P T E M B E R	21	World Coming Down	Type O Negative	-
S E P T E M B E R	22	King of the Nordic Twilight	Luca Turilli	-
S E P T E M B E R	24	Inside Wants Out	John Mayer	Debut/EP
S E P T E M B E R	27	Brand New Day	Sting	-
S E P T E M B E R	27	A Different Beat	Gary Moore	-
S E P T E M B E R	27	Back to the Heavyweight Jam	Scooter	-
S E P T E M B E R	27	Motion	The Cinematic Orchestra	-
S E P T E M B E R	28	A Matter of Time	Jason Sellers	-
S E P T E M B E R	28	Amen	Paula Cole	-
S E P T E M B E R	28	Balance	Swollen Members	-
S E P T E M B E R	28	Bennett Sings Ellington: Hot & Cool	Tony Bennett	-
S E P T E M B E R	28	Black Diamond	Angie Stone	US
S E P T E M B E R	28	Blackout!	Method Man & Redman	-
S E P T E M B E R	28	Calculating Infinity	The Dillinger Escape Plan	-
S E P T E M B E R	28	Come On Now Social	Indigo Girls	-
S E P T E M B E R	28	Deconstruction	Meredith Brooks	-
S E P T E M B E R	28	Garth Brooks in... the Life of Chris Gaines	Garth Brooks	as Chris Gaines
S E P T E M B E R	28	Ghost Town Live	The Specials	Live
S E P T E M B E R	28	Human Clay	Creed	-
S E P T E M B E R	28	LB IV Life	Lost Boyz	-
S E P T E M B E R	28	Lost and Gone Forever	Guster	-
S E P T E M B E R	28	The Luxury of Time	David Mead	Debut
S E P T E M B E R	28	Right Back	Long Beach Dub Allstars	Debut
S E P T E M B E R	28	Something To Write Home About	The Get Up Kids	-
S E P T E M B E R	28	Temperamental	Everything but the Girl	-
S E P T E M B E R	28	Very Emergency	The Promise Ring	-
S E P T E M B E R	28	World War III	Mac	-
S E P T E M B E R	28	XXX	ZZ Top	-
S E P T E M B E R	29	Ravishing Grimness	Darkthrone	-
S E P T E M B E R	?	Truth in Separation	Big Blue Monkey	-

=== October–December ===
Date		Album	Artist	Notes	
O C T O B E R	1	No Time for Love	Eighteen Visions	EP	
O C T O B E R	4	Run Devil Run	Paul McCartney	-	
O C T O B E R	4	From Here to Eternity: Live	The Clash	Live	
O C T O B E R	4	Hooray for Boobies	The Bloodhound Gang	-	
O C T O B E R	4	Symphony No. 1	Joe Jackson	-	
O C T O B E R	4	S Club	S Club 7	-	
O C T O B E R	5	All Hallow's EP	AFI	EP	
O C T O B E R	5	Breakdown	Melissa Etheridge	-	
O C T O B E R	5	Christmas the Cowboy Way	Riders in the Sky	Christmas	
O C T O B E R	5	Colour Moving and Still	Chantal Kreviazuk	-	
O C T O B E R	5	The Distance to Here	Live	-	
O C T O B E R	5	Eleven Songs	As Friends Rust	Compilation	
O C T O B E R	5	Uncontrolled Substance	Inspectah Deck	-	
O C T O B E R	5	Golden Arms Redemption	U-God	-	
O C T O B E R	5	More Betterness!	No Use for a Name	-	
O C T O B E R	5	Pinback	Pinback	Debut	
O C T O B E R	5	Synchronistic Wanderings	Pat Benatar	Compilation	
O C T O B E R	8	Nightlife	Pet Shop Boys	-	
O C T O B E R	8	No Ordinary World	Joe Cocker	-	
O C T O B E R	9	Rajaz	Camel	-	
O C T O B E R	11	Calla	Calla	-	
O C T O B E R	11	Cold Water Music	Aim	Debut	
O C T O B E R	11	Tokyo Warhearts	Children of Bodom	Live	
O C T O B E R	11	Millionaires	James	-	
O C T O B E R	12	Against Da Grain	YoungBloodZ	-	
O C T O B E R	12	American Girl	Juice Newton	-	
O C T O B E R	12	BBC Sessions	Cocteau Twins	-	
O C T O B E R	12	Black On Both Sides	Mos Def	-	
O C T O B E R	12	Breathe	Keller Williams with The String Cheese Incident	-	
O C T O B E R	12	Clapton Chronicles: The Best of Eric Clapton	Eric Clapton	Compilation	
O C T O B E R	12	Immortalized	Spice 1	-	
O C T O B E R	12	In Reverse	Matthew Sweet	-	
O C T O B E R	12	I Want It All	Warren G	-	
O C T O B E R	12	Live On	Kenny Wayne Shepherd	-	
O C T O B E R	12	The Marshall Suite	The Fall	-	
O C T O B E R	12	Otherworld	Lunasa	-	
O C T O B E R	12	The Private Years	Yanni	Box set	
O C T O B E R	12	Soundsystem	311	-	
O C T O B E R	12	Total Abandon: Live in Australia	Deep Purple	Live	
O C T O B E R	12	Where I Wanna Be	Donell Jones	-	
O C T O B E R	15	Agnen: A Journey Through the Dark	Keep of Kalessin	-	
O C T O B E R	18	Peace	Eurythmics	-	
O C T O B E R	18	Rock Art and the X-Ray Style	Joe Strummer & The Mescaleros	-	
O C T O B E R	18	Awake and Breathe	B*Witched	UK	
O C T O B E R	18	I Wanna Be Santa Claus	Ringo Starr	Christmas	
O C T O B E R	18	Rise	Gabrielle	UK	
O C T O B E R	18	Solo Journey	Bradley Joseph	-	
O C T O B E R	18	Still Life	Opeth	-	
O C T O B E R	18	Suicide Pact – You First	Therapy?	UK	
O C T O B E R	19	Antipop	Primus	-	
O C T O B E R	19	Bloodthirst	Cannibal Corpse	-	
O C T O B E R	19	The Cat and the Cobra	Les Savy Fav	-	
O C T O B E R	19	A Christmas to Remember	Amy Grant	Christmas	
O C T O B E R	19	Give 'Em the Boot II	Various Artists	Compilation	
O C T O B E R	19	God Save the Smithereens	The Smithereens	-	
O C T O B E R	19	Internal Affairs	Pharoahe Monch	-	
O C T O B E R	19	Keith Urban	Keith Urban	-	
O C T O B E R	19	Los grandes éxitos en español	Cypress Hill	Compilation with Spanish lyrics	
O C T O B E R	19	Modified	Save Ferris	-	
O C T O B E R	19	Nothing Gold Can Stay	A New Found Glory	-	
O C T O B E R	19	Smoke This	Lynch Mob	-	
O C T O B E R	19	So... How's Your Girl?	Handsome Boy Modeling School	Debut	
O C T O B E R	19	This Beautiful Life	Big Bad Voodoo Daddy	-	
O C T O B E R	19	This Christmas	98°	Christmas	
O C T O B E R	19	Washed Up!	Catch 22	EP	
O C T O B E R	20	Heavy Gauge	Glay	-	
O C T O B E R	25	As Time Goes By	Bryan Ferry	-	
O C T O B E R	25	Friends and Lovers	Bernard Butler	-	
O C T O B E R	25	Le Tigre	Le Tigre	Debut	
O C T O B E R	25	Leaders Not Followers	Napalm Death	EP	
O C T O B E R	25	Live from a Shark Cage	Papa M	-	
O C T O B E R	25	Steptacular	Steps	-	
O C T O B E R	25	Sunday 8PM / Saturday 3AM	Faithless	-	
O C T O B E R	25	Turn It on Again: The Hits	Genesis	Compilation	
O C T O B E R	25	Xeneizes	Quarashi	-	
O C T O B E R	26	Aktapuss	Akinyele	-	
O C T O B E R	26	All Systems Go 2	Rocket from the Crypt	-	
O C T O B E R	26	American Made Music to Strip By	Rob Zombie	Remix	
O C T O B E R	26	The Aquabats vs. the Floating Eye of Death!	The Aquabats	-	
O C T O B E R	26	The BDI Thug	Buckshot	-	
O C T O B E R	26	The Days of Our Nights	Luna	-	
O C T O B E R	26	Emergency & I	The Dismemberment Plan	-	
O C T O B E R	26	Forever: Rich Thugs, Book One	Above the Law	-	
O C T O B E R	26	The Grass Is Blue	Dolly Parton	US	
O C T O B E R	26	A Guided Tour of Chicago	The Lawrence Arms	-	
O C T O B E R	26	Hidden Stash	Kottonmouth Kings	-	
O C T O B E R	26	Introducing IMx	IMx	-	
O C T O B E R	26	LeAnn Rimes	LeAnn Rimes	-	
O C T O B E R	26	Looking Forward	Crosby, Stills, Nash & Young	-	
O C T O B E R	26	The Lost Files	Digital Underground	Compilation	
O C T O B E R	26	Make Yourself	Incubus	-	
O C T O B E R	26	Metropolis Pt. 2: Scenes from a Memory	Dream Theater	-	
O C T O B E R	26	No. 4	Stone Temple Pilots	-	
O C T O B E R	26	Only God Can Judge Me	Master P	-	
O C T O B E R	26	RéCréation	Florent Pagny	Double covers album	
O C T O B E R	26	The Science of Things	Bush	-	
O C T O B E R	26	Songs 2	Rich Mullins	Compilation	
O C T O B E R	26	State Songs	John Linnell	-	
O C T O B E R	26	Tiger Army	Tiger Army	-	
O C T O B E R	26	Under the Influence	Alan Jackson	-	
O C T O B E R	?	Empires	Jimi Jamison	Germany	
N O V E M B E R	1	Blank-Wave Arcade	The Faint	-	
N O V E M B E R	1	Ether~Electrified Porch Music	Carbon Leaf	-	
N O V E M B E R	1	Fire and Skill: The Songs of the Jam	Various Artists	Tribute	
N O V E M B E R	1	Horrorscope	Eve 6	-	
N O V E M B E R	1	Love and the Russian Winter	Simply Red	-	
N O V E M B E R	1	Love This City	The Whitlams	-	
N O V E M B E R	1	Of Someday Shambles	Jebediah	-	
N O V E M B E R	1	Paul McCartney's Working Classical	Paul McCartney	-	
N O V E M B E R	1	Twenty Four Seven	Tina Turner	UK	
N O V E M B E R	1	Westlife	Westlife	-	
N O V E M B E R	1	Wonderful	Madness	-	
N O V E M B E R	2	6:66 Satan's Child	Danzig	-	
N O V E M B E R	2	The Battle of Los Angeles	Rage Against the Machine	-	
N O V E M B E R	2	Bleach	Bleach	-	
N O V E M B E R	2	Tha Block Is Hot	Lil Wayne	Debut	
N O V E M B E R	2	Decks, EFX & 909	Richie Hawtin	Compilation	
N O V E M B E R	2	Dirty Harriet	Rah Digga	-	
N O V E M B E R	2	End of Days Original Movie Soundtrack	Various Artists	Soundtrack	
N O V E M B E R	2	Ice Cold	Choclair	Debut	
N O V E M B E R	2	It All Comes Down to This	Bane	-	
N O V E M B E R	2	Joy: A Holiday Collection	Jewel	Christmas	
N O V E M B E R	2	Making the Road	Hi-Standard	-	
N O V E M B E R	2	Northern Star	Melanie C	Debut	
N O V E M B E R	2	Proof That the Youth Are Revolting	Five Iron Frenzy	-	
N O V E M B E R	2	Rainbow	Mariah Carey	-	
N O V E M B E R	2	The Roots Come Alive	The Roots	Live	
N O V E M B E R	2	Scream for Me Brazil	Bruce Dickinson	Live	
N O V E M B E R	2	Shapeshifter	Marcy Playground	-	
N O V E M B E R	2	This Desert Life	Counting Crows	-	
N O V E M B E R	2	There Is Nothing Left to Lose	Foo Fighters	-	
N O V E M B E R	2	Through Being Cool	Saves The Day	-	
N O V E M B E R	8	Abbamania	Various Artists	Tribute	
N O V E M B E R	8	Choose Your Masques: Collectors Series Volume 2	Hawkwind	Live	
N O V E M B E R	8	Glastonbury 90	Hawkwind	Live	
N O V E M B E R	8	Greatest Hits III	Queen	Compilation	
N O V E M B E R	8	Invincible	Five	UK	
N O V E M B E R	8	Magic Hour	Cast	-	
N O V E M B E R	8	The Road to Hell: Part 2	Chris Rea	-	
N O V E M B E R	8	Waiting	Thursday	-	
N O V E M B E R	9	Affirmation	Savage Garden	-	
N O V E M B E R	9	Alanis Unplugged	Alanis Morissette	Live	
N O V E M B E R	9	Breathe	Faith Hill	-	
N O V E M B E R	9	Darrin's Coconut Ass: Live from Omaha	Goldfinger	Live	
N O V E M B E R	9	The Exchange	Against All Authority/The Criminals	Split EP	
N O V E M B E R	9	The Gift of Game	Crazy Town	-	
N O V E M B E R	9	Greatest Hits	Sublime	Compilation	
N O V E M B E R	9	It Just Gets Worse	Anal Cunt	-	
N O V E M B E R	9	Live at Sturgis	38 Special	Live	
N O V E M B E R	9	Marillion.com	Marillion	-	
N O V E M B E R	9	Metal Jukebox	Helloween	Covers	
N O V E M B E R	9	Rave Un2 the Joy Fantastic	Prince	-	
N O V E M B E R	9	Sugar	Tonic	-	
N O V E M B E R	9	When the Pawn...	Fiona Apple	-	
N O V E M B E R	10	Loveppears	Ayumi Hamasaki	-	
N O V E M B E R	11	Onka's Big Moka	Toploader	Debut	
N O V E M B E R	12	All the Way... A Decade of Song	Celine Dion	Compilation	
N O V E M B E R	12	The Corrs Unplugged	The Corrs	Live	
N O V E M B E R	12	The Last Tour on Earth	Marilyn Manson	Live	
N O V E M B E R	13	Spit	Kittie	Debut	
N O V E M B E R	15	The BBC Sessions	Small Faces	Compilation	
N O V E M B E R	15	Charlotte Church	Charlotte Church	-	
N O V E M B E R	15	My Guardian Anger	Lux Occulta	-	
N O V E M B E R	15	Singles of the 90s	Ace of Base	Compilation	
N O V E M B E R	16	2001	Dr. Dre	-	
N O V E M B E R	16	Chant Down Babylon	Various artists	Compilation	
N O V E M B E R	16	The Chosen Ones	Stratovarius	Compilation	
N O V E M B E R	16	Coping with the Urban Coyote	Unida	-	
N O V E M B E R	16	Cut Carefully and Play Loud	Rocket from the Crypt	EP	
N O V E M B E R	16	Everybody Makes Mistakes	Starflyer 59	-	
N O V E M B E R	16	Faith: A Holiday Album	Kenny G	Holiday	
N O V E M B E R	16	Greatest Hits of the 20th Century	Béla Fleck and the Flecktones	Compilation	
N O V E M B E R	16	The House of Atreus Act I	Virgin Steele	-	
N O V E M B E R	16	Immobilarity	Raekwon	-	
N O V E M B E R	16	Issues	Korn	-	
N O V E M B E R	16	Live... With a Little Help from Our Friends	Gov't Mule	Live	
N O V E M B E R	16	Love Liberty Disco	Newsboys	-	
N O V E M B E R	16	Ödemarkens Son	Vintersorg	-	
N O V E M B E R	16	Reload	Tom Jones	-	
N O V E M B E R	16	Return of the Killer A's	Anthrax	Compilation	
N O V E M B E R	16	SYR4: Goodbye 20th Century	Sonic Youth	-	
N O V E M B E R	16	Tha Streetz Iz a Mutha	Kurupt	-	
N O V E M B E R	16	Timeless: The Classics Vol. 2	Michael Bolton	-	
N O V E M B E R	16	To the Teeth	Ani DiFranco	-	
N O V E M B E R	22	Early Days: Best of Led Zeppelin Volume One	Led Zeppelin	Compilation	
N O V E M B E R	22	Ecliptica	Sonata Arctica	Debut	
N O V E M B E R	22	Europop	Eiffel 65	-	
N O V E M B E R	22	Don't Mind If I Do	Culture Club	-	
N O V E M B E R	22	Halfway to a Threeway	Jim O'Rourke	EP	
N O V E M B E R	23	Alchemy	Yngwie Malmsteen	-	
N O V E M B E R	23	Sweet Kisses	Jessica Simpson	Debut album	
N O V E M B E R	23	Amplified	Q-Tip	-	
N O V E M B E R	23	Blue	Third Eye Blind	-	
N O V E M B E R	23	The Decline	NOFX	EP	-
N O V E M B E R	23	Enrique	Enrique Iglesias	English-language debut	-
N O V E M B E R	23	Friends Again	Various Artists	TV Soundtrack	-
N O V E M B E R	23	Garth Brooks & the Magic of Christmas	Garth Brooks	Christmas	-
N O V E M B E R	23	Grey Dawn	October Tide	-	
N O V E M B E R	23	Hampton Comes Alive	Phish	Live	
N O V E M B E R	23	Listener Supported	Dave Matthews Band	Live	
N O V E M B E R	23	Midnite Vultures	Beck	-	
N O V E M B E R	23	IX Equilibrium	Emperor	-	
N O V E M B E R	23	Live	They Might Be Giants	Live	
N O V E M B E R	23	Nastradamus	Nas	-	
N O V E M B E R	23	S&M	Metallica with the San Francisco Symphony	Live	
N O V E M B E R	23	The Sounds of Science	Beastie Boys	Compilation +1 new track	
N O V E M B E R	23	This Is Your Time	Michael W. Smith	-	
N O V E M B E R	23	Viva Wisconsin	Violent Femmes	Live	
N O V E M B E R	26	The Millennium Bell	Mike Oldfield	-	
N O V E M B E R	29	Complete '79: Collectors Series Volume 1	Hawkwind	Live	
N O V E M B E R	29	Lara Fabian	Lara Fabian	-	
N O V E M B E R	30	The Fragile Art of Existence	Control Denied	-	
N O V E M B E R	30	The Greatest Hits	Cher	Compilation	
N O V E M B E R	30	Live Era '87–'93	Guns N' Roses	Live	
N O V E M B E R	30	The Master	Rakim	-	
N O V E M B E R	30	The Mystery of the Whisper	The Crüxshadows	-	
N O V E M B E R	30	Unleash the Dragon	Sisqo	-	
N O V E M B E R	?	Greatest Hits	Alien Ant Farm	Debut	
N O V E M B E R	?	Pae Mu Ka	Obrafour	Debut	
D E C E M B E R	6	Hagnesta Hill	Kent	Sweden	
D E C E M B E R	6	Songs from the Last Century	George Michael	Covers album	
D E C E M B E R	7	Born Again	The Notorious B.I.G.	Compilation	
D E C E M B E R	7	Kaleidoscope	Kelis	-	
D E C E M B E R	7	Magnolia	Aimee Mann	Soundtrack	
D E C E M B E R	7	Methods of Mayhem	Methods of Mayhem	-	
D E C E M B E R	7	Mimosa	Fun Lovin' Criminals	Compilation	
D E C E M B E R	7	Resurrection	Vice Squad	-	
D E C E M B E R	7	Sheryl Crow and Friends: Live from Central Park	Sheryl Crow	Live	
D E C E M B E R	7	So Real	Mandy Moore	Debut	
D E C E M B E R	7	Tha G-Code	Juvenile	-	
D E C E M B E R	10	Vision Creation Newsun	Boredoms	Japan	
D E C E M B E R	13	Still I Rise	2Pac and Outlawz	UK	
D E C E M B E R	14	Speak Kindly of Your Volunteer Fire Department	Robert Pollard and Doug Gillard	-	
D E C E M B E R	21	...And Then There Was X	DMX	-	
D E C E M B E R	21	Best of the Specials	The Specials	Compilation	
D E C E M B E R	21	Everything Is Healing Nicely	Frank Zappa	-	
D E C E M B E R	21	World Party	Goodie Mob	-	
D E C E M B E R	23	Yesterday Was Dramatic – Today Is OK	múm	Debut	
D E C E M B E R	28	Rape of the Bastard Nazarene	Akercocke	Debut	

=== Release date unknown ===
- Amalgamation – Trapt
- Brainfreeze – Cut Chemist, & DJ Shadow
- Ella in Budapest, Hungary – Ella Fitzgerald
- A Far Cry from Dead – Townes Van Zandt
- Haiku d'Etat – Haiku d'Etat
- Live in Chicago – Kurt Elling
- A Matter of Time – Hilltop Hoods
- Mi Día de la Independencia – Lynda Thomas
- Motor Driven Bimbo – Rockbitch
- My Fruit Psychobells...A Seed Combustible – maudlin of the Well
- Niun Niggung – Mouse on Mars
- Retrograss – John Hartford, David Grisman, & Mike Seeger
- Side Show Freaks – 40 Below Summer
- Simple Pleasure – Tindersticks
- Stars Forever – Momus

== Programs Releasing this Year ==
Date	Song	Artist
March 30	Only 4 the K People	The Chemical Brothers
April 19	Mambo No. 5	Lou Bega
April 26	Brothers & Sisters	Coldplay
May 27	It's All About You (Not About Me)	Tracie Spencer
May 31	Hey Boy Hey Girl	The Chemical Brothers
August 2	Let Forever Be	The Chemical Brothers featuring Noel Gallagher
August 30	I Got a Girl	Lou Bega
October 11	Out of Control	The Chemical Brothers
October 26	Sandstorm	Darude
December 7	Tricky, Tricky	Lou Bega

== Biggest hit singles ==
The following songs achieved the highest chart positions in the charts of 1999.

#	Artist	Title	Year	Country	Chart Entries
1	Britney Spears	...Baby One More Time	1999	(United States)	UK 1 – Feb 1999, US BB 1 of 1999, Netherlands 1 – Jan 1999, Sweden 1 – Jan 1999, Austria 1 – Mar 1999, Switzerland 1 – Feb 1999, Norway 1 – Feb 1999, Australia 1 of 1999, Germany 1 – Feb 1999, Republic of Ireland 1 – Feb 1999, New Zealand 1 for 4 weeks Feb 1999, Australia 1 for 9 weeks Jun 1999, Poland 3 – Mar 1999, France 6 – Jan 1999, Italy 7 of 1999, US BB 29 of 1999, POP 29 of 1999, Germany 41 of the 1990s, Scrobulate 91 of upbeat, RYM 95 of 1998, OzNet 814, Acclaimed 875
2	Lou Bega	Mambo No 5 (A Little Bit of ...)	1999	(Germany)	UK 1 – Sep 1999, Netherlands 1 – Jun 1999, Austria 1 – May 1999, Switzerland 1 – May 1999, Norway 1 – Jun 1999, Germany 1 – May 1999, Republic of Ireland 1 – Aug 1999, New Zealand 1 for 6 weeks Sep 1999, Australia 1 for 8 weeks Jan 2000, Australia 3 of 1999, Italy 3 of 1999, POP 3 of 1999, Poland 4 – Jul 1999, US BB 4 of 1999, US BB 4 of 1999, Party 04 of 1999, Sweden 5 – Aug 1999, Germany 11 of the 1990s, RYM 189 of 1999
3	Eiffel 65	Blue (Da Ba Dee)	1999	(Italy)	UK 1 – Sep 1999, Netherlands 1 – Jul 1999, Sweden 1 – Aug 1999, Austria 1 – Aug 1999, Switzerland 1 – Jul 1999, Norway 1 – Aug 1999, Germany 1 – Jul 1999, Republic of Ireland 1 – Sep 1999, New Zealand 1 for 1 weeks Nov 1999, Australia 1 for 9 weeks Mar 2000, Poland 1 for 2 weeks Jan 2000, US BB 6 of 2000, Italy 16 of 1999, Australia 20 of 1999, Germany 20 of the 1990s, US BB 32 of 1999, Party 103 of 1999, RYM 185 of 1998
4	TLC	No Scrubs	1999	(United States)	US BB 1 of 1999, Republic of Ireland 1 – May 1999, New Zealand 1 for 2 weeks Apr 1999, Australia 1 for 7 weeks Aug 1999, UK 3 – Apr 1999, Netherlands 3 – Mar 1999, Australia 4 of 1999, Switzerland 5 – Apr 1999, Germany 5 – Apr 1999, France 6 – Mar 1999, Norway 7 – Apr 1999, US BB 12 of 1999, Sweden 19 – Mar 1999, Poland 21 – Apr 1999, Austria 30 – May 1999, Italy 30 of 1999, POP 33 of 1999, Scrobulate 52 of rnb, RYM 55 of 1999, Acclaimed 268, Germany 302 of the 1990s, RIAA 361
5	Backstreet Boys	I Want It That Way	1999	(United States)	Sweden 1 – Oct 1999, France 20 – Sep 1999, Norway 1 – Nov 1999, Germany 1 – Jan 2000, Republic of Ireland 1 – May 2000, Austria 1 – Sep 1999, UK 1 – Apr 2000, Switzerland 1- Sep 1999, Italy 1 of 2000, Netherlands 1 – Oct 1999, US BB 18 of 2000, POP 18 of 2000, Poland 24 – Oct 1999, Australia 25 of 2000, RYM 41 of 1999, US BB 52 of 2000, Scrobulate 66 of fun, Germany 98 of the 1990s, Party 98 of 1999

== Top 40 Chart hit singles ==
Song title	Artist(s)	Release date(s)	US	UK	Highest chart position	Other chart performance(s)	–	"2 Times"	Ann Lee	August 1999	n/a	2	1 (Belgium, Scotland)	See chart performance entry

=== Other Chart hit singles ===
- "9pm (Till I Come)" – ATB
- "Absolutely Everybody" – Vanessa Amorosi
- "Adelante" – Sash!
- "All I Really Want" – Kim Lukas
- "All or Nothing" – Cher
- "All Out of Love" – Andru Donalds
- "All Star" – Smash Mouth
- "All the Small Things" – Blink-182
- "Aller plus haut" – Tina Arena
- "Almost Doesn't Count" – Brandy
- "Always Have, Always Will" – Ace of Base
- "American Woman" – Lenny Kravitz
- "Amazed" – Lonestar
- "Ana's Song (Open Fire)" – Silverchair
- "Angel" – Sarah McLachlan
- "Angel of Mine" – Monica
- "The Animal Song" – Savage Garden
- "Anton aus Tirol" – Anton & DJ Ötzi
- "Aquí" – La Ley
- "Around the World" – Red Hot Chili Peppers
- "As" – George Michael & Mary J. Blige
- "Au Nom de la rose" – Moos
- "...Baby One More Time" – Britney Spears
- "Back At One" – Brian McKnight
- "Back in My Life" – Alice DeeJay
- "The Bad Touch" – Bloodhound Gang
- "Bailamos" – Enrique Iglesias
- "Bawitdaba" – Kid Rock
- "B-Boys & Flygirls" – Bomfunk MC's
- "Beautiful Stranger" – Madonna
- "The Best of Me" – Bryan Adams
- "Better Best Forgotten" – Steps
- "Better Days (And the Bottom Drops Out)" – Citizen King
- "Big Big World" – Emilia
- "Bills, Bills, Bills" – Destiny's Child
- "Bla Bla Bla" – Gigi D'Agostino
- "Black Balloon" – Goo Goo Dolls
- "Blue (Da Ba Dee)" – Eiffel 65
- "Blue Monday" – Orgy
- "Bongo Bong" – Manu Chao
- "Boom, Boom, Boom, Boom" – Vengaboys
- "Born to Make You Happy" – Britney Spears
- "Break Stuff" – Limp Bizkit
- "Bring It All Back" – S Club 7
- "Bring It All To Me" – Blaque
- "Burning Down the House" – Tom Jones & The Cardigans
- "Bye Bye Baby" – TQ
- "Call Me Mañana" – Scooter
- "Candy" – Mandy Moore
- "Canned Heat" – Jamiroquai
- "Caught Out There" – Kelis
- "The Carpet Crawlers 1999" – Genesis
- "Cherish the Day" – Sade
- "Corazón Perdido" – Lynda Thomas
- "Daddy DJ" – Daddy DJ
- "The Day the World Went Away" – Nine Inch Nails
- "Desert Rose" – Sting
- "Dizzy" – Goo Goo Dolls
- "The Dolphin's Cry" – Live
- "Don't Call Me Baby" – Madison Avenue
- "Don't Say You Love Me" – M2M
- "Don't Stop!" – ATB
- "Dov'e l'amore" – Cher
- "Down So Long" – Jewel
- "Drinking in L.A." – Bran Van 3000
- "Drop It" – Scoop
- "Electricity" – Suede
- "Enjoy Yourself" – A+
- "Everlasting Night" – Dannii Minogue
- "Everybody's Free (To Wear Sunscreen)" – Baz Luhrmann
- "Everyday I Love You" – Boyzone
- "Every Morning" – Sugar Ray
- "Ex-Factor" – Lauryn Hill
- "Falling Away From Me" – KoЯn
- "Faster Harder Scooter" – Scooter
- "Fear the Voices" – Alice in Chains
- "Flat Beat" – Mr. Oizo
- "Fly Away" – Lenny Kravitz
- "Flying Without Wings" – Westlife
- "Freak on a Leash" – KoЯn
- "From The Bottom of My Broken Heart" – Britney Spears
- "Fuck the Millennium" – Scooter
- "Genie in a Bottle" – Christina Aguilera
- "Get Born Again" – Alice in Chains
- "Get Get Down" – Paul Johnson
- "Glorious" – Andreas Johnson
- "The Great Beyond" – R.E.M.
- "Guerrilla Radio" – Rage Against the Machine
- "Guilty Conscience" – Eminem
- "The Hardest Thing" – 98 Degrees
- "Have You Ever?" – Brandy
- "Heartbreak Hotel" – Whitney Houston, Faith Evans, & Kelly Price
- "Heartbreaker" – Mariah Carey
- "Heavy" – Collective Soul
- "Hello Time Bomb" – Matthew Good Band
- "Here with Me" – Dido
- "Hey Boy Hey Girl" – The Chemical Brothers
- "Honey to the Bee" – Billie
- "I Feel Lonely" – Sascha Schmitz
- "I Don't Know What You Want but I Can't Give It Any More" – Pet Shop Boys
- "I Got a Girl" – Lou Bega
- "I Have a Dream" – Westlife
- "I Knew I Loved You" – Savage Garden
- "I Learned from the Best" - Whitney Houston
- "I Need to Know" – Marc Anthony
- "I Saved the World Today" – Eurythmics
- "I Still Believe" – Mariah Carey
- "I Try" – Macy Gray
- "I Wanna Love You Forever" – Jessica Simpson
- "I Want It That Way" – Backstreet Boys
- "I Will Remember You" – Sarah McLachlan
- "If I Could Turn Back the Hands of Time" – R. Kelly
- "If I Let You Go" – Westlife
- "If Ya Gettin' Down" – Five
- "If You Had My Love" – Jennifer Lopez
- "If You Love Me" – Mint Condition
- "If You Want Me to" – Ginny Owens
- "Ihr seid so leise" – Aquagen
- "Immer wieder" - Laura Schneider
- "I'm Always Here" – Jimi Jamison
- "In Our Lifetime" – Texas
- "Irgendwie, irgendwo, irgendwann" – Jan Delay
- "It's Not Right but It's Okay" – Whitney Houston
- "It's Only Us" – Robbie Williams
- "Jesse Hold On" – B*Witched
- "Join Me in Death" – HIM
- "Kalimba de Luna" – Garcia
- "Keep On Movin'" – Five
- "Kernkraft 400" – Zombie Nation
- "The Kids Aren't Alright" – The Offspring
- "King of My Castle" – Wamdue Project
- "Kiss Me" – Sixpence None the Richer
- "Kiss of Life" – Sade
- "Kiss (When the Sun Don't Shine)" – Vengaboys
- "Larger than Life" – Backstreet Boys
- "Last Kiss" – Pearl Jam
- "The Launch" – DJ Jean
- "Lean on Me (with the Family)" – 2-4 Family
- "Learn to Fly" – Foo Fighters
- "Lit Up" – Buckcherry
- "Livin' la Vida Loca" – Ricky Martin
- "Load Me Up" – Matthew Good Band
- "Look at Me" – Geri Halliwell
- "Love's Got a Hold on My Heart" – Steps
- "Ma Baker" – Boney M vs Sash!
- "Maldita Timidez" – Lynda Thomas
- "Mamboleo" – Loona
- "Mamma Mia" – A-Teens
- "Man! I Feel Like a Woman!" – Shania Twain
- "Maria" – Blondie
- "Maschen-Draht-Zaun" – Stefan Raab
- "MfG" – Die Fantastischen Vier
- "Mi Chico Latino" – Geri Halliwell
- "The Millennium Prayer" – Cliff Richard
- "The Miracle" – Cliff Richard
- "Move Your Body" – Eiffel 65
- "(Mucho Mambo) Sway" – Shaft
- "Mudshovel" – Staind
- "Muscle Museum" – Muse
- "Music of My Heart" – Gloria Estefan & NSYNC
- "My Love Is Your Love" – Whitney Houston
- "My Name Is" – Eminem
- "My Own Worst Enemy" – Lit
- "Nie Wieder" – Tic Tac Toe
- "New Day" – Wyclef Jean & Bono
- "New York City Boy" – Pet Shop Boys
- "Northern Star" – Melanie C
- "No Quiero Verte" – Lynda Thomas
- "No Scrubs" – TLC
- "Nookie" – Limp Bizkit
- "Nothing Else Matters '99" – Metallica
- "Nothing Is Real but the Girl" – Blondie
- "Nothing Really Matters" – Madonna
- "Ö La Palöma Blanca" – Ö La Palöma Boys
- "Opa Opa" – Antique
- "Parce que c'est toi" – Axelle Red
- "Perfect Moment" – Martine McCutcheon
- "Praise You" – Fatboy Slim
- "Pretty Fly (For a White Guy)" – The Offspring
- "Promises" – The Cranberries
- "Protect Your Mind (For the Love of a Princess)" – DJ Sakin & Friends
- "The Riddle" – Gigi D'Agostino
- "The Rigga-Ding-Dong-Song" – Passion Fruit
- "Right Here, Right Now" – Fatboy Slim
- "Rhythm Divine" – Enrique Iglesias
- "S Club Party" – S Club 7
- "Saltwater" – Chicane
- "Sandstorm" – Darude
- "Satisfy You" – Puff Daddy & R. Kelly
- "Scar Tissue" – Red Hot Chili Peppers
- "Seasons in the Sun" – Westlife
- "Sexy, Sexy Lover" – Modern Talking
- "Shake Your Bon-Bon" – Ricky Martin
- "She Wants You" – Billie
- "She's All I Ever Had" – Ricky Martin
- "She's So High" – Tal Bachman
- "She's the One" – Robbie Williams
- "Show Me the Meaning of Being Lonely" – Backstreet Boys
- "Silence" – Delerium & Sarah McLachlan
- "Sing it Back" – Moloko
- "Sitting Down Here" – Lene Marlin
- "Sleep Now in the Fire" – Rage Against the Machine
- "Slide" – Goo Goo Dolls
- "Slippin'" – DMX
- "Smooth" – Santana & Rob Thomas
- "So bist du (und wenn Du gehst...)" – Oli P.
- "Someday" – Sugar Ray
- "Sometimes" – Britney Spears
- "Stay The Same" – Joey McIntyre
- "Steal My Sunshine" – Len
- "Still D.R.E." – Dr. Dre & Snoop Dogg
- "Strong" – Robbie Williams
- "Strong Enough" – Cher
- "Summer Girls" – LFO
- "Summer Son" – Texas
- "Sun Is Shining" – Bob Marley vs Funkstar De Luxe
- "Super Trouper" – A-Teens
- "Swear It Again" – Westlife
- "Sweet Like Chocolate" – Shanks & Bigfoot
- "Take a Picture" – Filter
- "Take Me to Your Heaven" – Charlotte Nilsson
- "Tarzan & Jane" – Toy-Box
- "Tell Me Why" – Prezioso & Marvin
- "Tender" – Blur
- "Thank ABBA for the Music" – Steps, Tina Cousins, Cleopatra, B*Witched, Billie
- "That's The Way It Is" – Celine Dion
- "That Don't Impress Me Much" – Shania Twain
- "Then the Morning Comes" – Smash Mouth
- "There She Goes" – Sixpence None the Richer
- "Too Much of Heaven" – Eiffel 65
- "Tu ne m'as pas laissé le temps" – David Hallyday
- "Turn Around" – Phats & Small
- "Turn Your Lights Down Low" – Lauryn Hill & Bob Marley
- "Two in a Million" – S Club 7
- "U Don't Know Me" – Armand Van Helden
- "U Know What's Up" – Donell Jones & Lisa Lopes
- "Unpretty" – TLC
- "Vamos a la playa" – Miranda
- "Vater Unser" – E Nomine
- "Vivre pour le meilleur" – Johnny Hallyday
- "Voices" – Ann Lee
- "Voodoo" – Godsmack
- "Waiting for Tonight" – Jennifer Lopez
- "We Can Leave the World" – Sascha Schmitz
- "We're Going to Ibiza" – Vengaboys
- "What a Girl Wants" – Christina Aguilera
- "What It's Like" – Everlast
- "What's It Gonna Be?!" – Busta Rhymes & Janet Jackson
- "What's My Age Again?" – Blink-182
- "When the Heartache Is Over" – Tina Turner
- "When Worlds Collide" – Powerman 5000
- "When You Believe" – Whitney Houston & Mariah Carey
- "When You Say Nothing at All" – Ronan Keating
- "Where I'm Headed" – Lene Marlin
- "Where My Girls At" – 702
- "Why Does My Heart Feel So Bad?" – Moby
- "Why Don't You Get a Job?" – The Offspring
- "Wild Wild West" – Will Smith & Dru Hill & Kool Moe Dee
- "Will 2K" – Will Smith & K-Ci
- "Wish I Could Fly" – Roxette
- "The World Is Not Enough" – Garbage
- "You Are Not Alone" – Modern Talking
- "(You Drive Me) Crazy" – Britney Spears
- "You Get What You Give" – New Radicals
- "You Needed Me" – Boyzone
- "You'll Be in My Heart" – Phil Collins
- "You're My Number One" – S Club 7
- "You're Still the One" – Shania Twain

== Notable singles ==
Song title	Artist(s)	Release date(s)	Other chart performance(s)
"Ana's Song (Open Fire)"	Silverchair	May 1999	See chart performance entry
"Windowlicker"	Aphex Twin	March 1999	See chart performance entry

=== Other Notable singles ===
- "Comin' Up from Behind" – Marcy Playground

== Top 10 selling albums of the year in USA ==
1. Backstreet Boys – Millennium
2. Britney Spears – ...Baby One More Time
3. Shania Twain – Come on Over
4. 'N Sync – *NSYNC
5. Ricky Martin – Ricky Martin
6. Christina Aguilera – Christina Aguilera
7. Santana – Supernatural
8. TLC – FanMail
9. Kid Rock – Devil Without a Cause
10. Eminem – The Slim Shady LP

== Classical music ==
- Samuel Adler – Viola Concerto
- Leonardo Balada – Piano Concerto No. 3
- Michael Daugherty – Hell's Angels
- Joël-François Durand – La Terre et le Feu for oboe and orchestra
- Carlo Forlivesi – Requiem
- Juan Guinjoan – Fanfarria
- Patrick Hawes – The Call (song cycle)
- Joe Jackson – Symphony No. 1
- Karl Jenkins – The Armed Man: A Mass for Peace
- John Kinsella – Symphony No. 8: Into the New Millennium
- Richard Payne – Saxophone Concerto
- Wolfgang Rihm
  - Ende der Handschrift. Elf späte Gedichte von Heiner Müller
  - Zwiesprache for piano
- Karlheinz Stockhausen –
  - Klavierstück XVII, for 8- or 2-track tape, electronic keyboard, and sound projectionist, 7 1/2 ex Nr. 64
  - Komet (Comet) for 8- or 2-track tape, percussionist, and sound projectionist, 7 2/3 ex Nr. 64
  - Lichter—Wasser (Sunday Greeting), for soprano, tenor, and orchestra, Nr. 75
  - Paare vom Freitag, with soprano, bass, electronic instruments (tape), Nr. 63
- Mindaugas Urbaitis
  - Fanfare for the Vilnius Festival for orchestra
  - Der Fall Wagner for ensemble

== Opera ==
- William Bolcom – A View from the Bridge
- Deborah Drattell – Festival of Regrets
- Rued Langgaard – Antikrist (composed 1921–30, premiered 1999)
- Daron Hagen – Bandanna
- John Harbison – The Great Gatsby
- Nicholas Lens – The Accacha Chronicles Trilogy: Terra Terra – The Aquarius Era

== Musical theater ==
- Annie Get Your Gun (Irving Berlin) – Broadway revival
- Fame – The Musical – London production
- Kiss Me, Kate (Cole Porter) – Broadway revival
- Mamma Mia! (ABBA) – London production
- My Fair Lady (Lerner & Loewe) – London revival
- Saturday Night Fever (musical) – Broadway production opened at the Minskoff Theatre and ran for 501 performances

== Musical films ==
- Buena Vista Social Club
- Mother
- Pyaar Mein Kabhi Kabhi
- Raja
- Sangamam
- South Park: Bigger, Longer & Uncut
- Sugar Town
- Topsy-Turvy

== Births ==
- January 1
  - Diamond White, American singer, actress, and voice actress
  - That Kid, American singer, songwriter, and social media personality
- January 5 – Marc Yu, American pianist and cellist
- January 6 – Polo G, American rapper and songwriter
- January 8 – Damiano David, Italian singer and songwriter, vocal of Måneskin
- January 11 – Christian Nodal, Mexican singer
- January 15 – Minami Kato, Japanese idol and actress (former NGT48)
- January 21 – Em Beihold, American singer-songwriter
- January 22 – Ravyn Lenae, American singer-songwriter
- January 23 – Madi Davis, American singer-songwriter, team Pharrell Williams
- January 24 – Niki, Indonesian R&B singer-songwriter and record producer
- January 25
  - Lucas Wong, Hong Kong rapper
  - Jai Waetford, Australian recording artist and actor (Contestant on X Factor Australia)
- January 28 – Hrvy, English singer
- February 7 – Bea Miller, American singer-songwriter and actress
- February 11 – Dino, South Korean singer and dancer (Seventeen)
- February 16 – Girl in Red, Norwegian Indie musician and record producer
- March 2 – Caleb Lee Hutchinson, American singer
- March 5
  - Madison Beer, American singer, songwriter, activist and actress
  - Yeri, South Korean singer-songwriter (Red Velvet)
- March 9 - Lloyiso, South African singer-songwriter and producer
- March 12 – Sakura Oda, Japanese pop singer and dancer (Morning Musume)
- March 14 – Olivia Dean, English singer
- March 23 – Yunho, South Korean singer, dancer and actor (Ateez)
- March 25 – Iann Dior, American rapper and singer and songwriter
- March 30 – Towa Bird, British singer-songwriter and guitar player
- April 2
  - Elaine, South African singer and songwriter
  - Audrey Nuna, American rapper
- April 4
  - Sheku Kanneh-Mason, British cellist, BBC Young Musician 2016 winner
  - Miki Nishino, Japanese talent and idol (former AKB48)
- April 6 – Lick-G, Japanese rapper
- April 9 – Lil Nas X, American rapper, singer and songwriter
- April 20 – Carly Rose Sonenclar, American X Factor runner up, actress and singer
- April 23
  - Chaeyoung, South Korean singer, rapper (TWICE)
  - Laufey (singer), Icelandic singer and songwriter
  - Claud Mintz, American singer
- April 24 – Ziyu He, Chinese violinist
- April 30 – Keung To, Hong Kong singer (MIRROR)
- May 1 – YNW Melly, American rapper
- May 7 – Masaki Satō, Japanese pop singer (Morning Musume)
- May 11 – Sabrina Carpenter, American singer, songwriter and actress
- May 23
  - Trinidad Cardona, American rapper
  - Blanka Stajkow, Polish singer
- May 25 – Whethan, American DJ
- June 1 – Dmytro Udovychenko, Ukrainian violinist
- June 14 – Tzuyu, Taiwanese singer (Twice)
- June 15
  - Peso Pluma, Mexican singer
  - Yeosang, South Korean singer and dancer (Ateez)
- June 17 – Frances Forever, American singer
- June 18
  - Trippie Redd, American singer, rapper, songwriter
  - Willie Spence, American singer and contestant on American Idol (d. 2022)
- June 20 – Yui Mizuno, Japanese musician, singer, model, and actress (Babymetal)
- June 27 – Aitana (singer), Spanish singer, songwriter and model
- July 4 – Moa Kikuchi, Japanese singer, musician, actress and model (Babymetal)
- July 5 – Kang Hye-won, South Korean singer (former Iz*One)
- July 10 – San, South Korean singer and dancer, and member of Ateez
- July 14 – Camryn, American singer and actress
- July 20 – Pop Smoke, American rapper (d. 2020)
- July 22 – Alma Agger, Danish singer
- July 23
  - YN Jay, American rapper
  - Gabito Ballesteros, Mexican singer
- July 26 – Mizuki Yamashita, Japanese idol, model and actress (Nogizaka46)
- July 28 – Glorilla, American rapper
- August 2 – Mark Lee, Canadian rapper, songwriter (NCT, SuperM)
- August 3 –
  - DC the Don, American rapper
  - Nemo, Swiss musician and singer-rapper, winner of the Eurovision Song Contest 2024
- August 6 – Lil Gotit, American rapper
- August 7 – Mariah Angeliq, American singer
- August 8
  - Xiaojun, Chinese singer and dancer (WayV and NCT)
  - Laura Kamhuber, Austrian singer
- August 9 – Mingi, South Korean rapper and songwriter (Ateez)
- August 10 – Ninajirachi, Australian electronic music DJ and producer
- August 11 – Changbin, South Korean rapper and songwriter (Stray Kids)
- August 13
  - Giulia Be, Brazilian singer
  - Lennon Stella, Canadian singer and actress
- August 17 – Unknown T, English rapper
- August 19 – Salem Ilese, American singer-songwriter
- August 25 – Silver Sphere, American independent singer-songwriter and musician
- September 3 – Rich Brian, Indonesian rapper, songwriter, and record producer
- September 7 – Gracie Abrams, American singer-songwriter
- September 13 – Yeonjun, South Korean singer, songwriter and dancer (Tomorrow X Together)
- September 15 – Nana Owada, Japanese idol and actress (former AKB48)
- September 23 – Yuqi, Chinese singer-songwriter, television host ((G)I-dle)
- September 28 – Hendery – Chinese singer (WayV and NCT)
- September 29 – Choi Ye-na, South Korean singer (former Iz*One)
- October 1 – Marlisa Punzalan, Australian singer, X Factor Australia 6th series winner
- October 4 – Lit Killah, Argentine rapper
- October 20
  - YoungBoy Never Broke Again, American rapper, singer, and songwriter
  - Chuu, South Korean singer and television personality (Loona)
- October 22 – Sub Urban (musician), an American singer, producer and songwriter (Benee, Bella Poarch, Aurora (singer))
- October 23 – Yui Kobayashi, Japanese idol, model and actress (Sakurazaka46)
- October 24 – Yng Lvcas, Mexican rapper
- October 25 - Dylan, English musician, singer and songwriter
- October 27 – Haruka Kudō, Japanese actress and singer (Morning Musume)
- November 10 – Petit Biscuit, French DJ and music producer
- November 11 – Samara Joy, American jazz singer
- November 17 – Paris Paloma, English singer-songwriter, guitarist and activist
- November 21 – Isaiah Firebrace, Australian singer, X Factor Australia 8th series winner\
- November 26
  - Clinton Kane, American entertainer and singer
  - Wooyoung, South Korean singer and dancer (Ateez)
- December 8 – Céline Dept, Belgian influencer
- December 12 – Alemeda, A Sudenese-Ethiopian singer-songwriter
- December 17
  - Holly Humberstone British singer-songwriter
  - Mirei Sasaki, Japanese model, idol, actress and reporter (Hinatazaka46)
  - Aiden, Maltese singer-songwriter
- December 18 – YBN Nahmir, American rapper and songwriter
- December 25
  - Dynoro, Lithuanian DJ and music producer
  - Bulow, German musician
- Unknown: Kim Dracula, an Australian trap metal/hardcore music artis

== Deaths ==
- January 2 – Rolf Liebermann (88), composer
- January 21 – Charles Brown, (76), blues singer and pianist
- January 22 – Gabor Carelli (83), operatic tenor
- January 23 – "Prince" Lincoln Thompson (49), reggae musician
- February 3 – Gwen Guthrie (48), singer
- February 4 – Kenneth C. Burns (68), country musician
- February 6 – Jimmy Roberts (74), American tenor
- February 12
  - Toni Fisher (67), singer
  - Grace Panvini (91), soprano
- February 14 – Buddy Knox (65), singer and songwriter
- February 15
  - Lamont "Big L" Coleman (24), rapper (gunshot)
  - Agnes Bernelle (75), actress and singer
- February 16 – Necil Kazım Akses (90), Turkish composer (date of death from this contemporary newspaper)
- March 2
  - David Ackles (62), singer/songwriter
  - Dusty Springfield (59), singer (breast cancer)
- March 4 – Eddie Dean (91), country music artist, actor
- March 7 – Lowell Fulson (77), blues guitarist and songwriter
- March 9 – Harry Somers (73), Canadian composer
- March 12 – Yehudi Menuhin (92), violinist and musical director
- March 13 – Bidu Sayão (97), Brazilian opera singer
- March 14
  - Gregg Diamond (49), jazz pianist
  - Marius Müller (40), Norwegian guitarist (car crash)
- March 20 – Elsa Barraine (89), French composer
- March 26 – Ananda Shankar (50), Indian classical musician and composer (cardiac arrest)
- March 28 – Freaky Tah (27), rapper (Lost Boyz) (shot)
- March 29 – Joe Williams (80), jazz singer
- April 1 – Jesse Stone (97), R & B musician and songwriter
- April 3 – Lionel Bart (68), songwriter and composer
- April 6 – Red Norvo (91), jazz musician
- April 14 – Anthony Newley (67), songwriter, actor and singer
- April 16 – Skip Spence (52), musician (Jefferson Airplane, Moby Grape), lung cancer
- April 21 – Buddy Rogers (94), jazz musician
- April 25
  - Roger Troutman (47), R&B singer (gunshot wounds)
  - Larry Troutman (54), R&B percussionist (suicide after killing younger brother)
  - Kemi Olusanya (35), British drum and bass duo Kemistry & Storm (freak highway accident)
- April 26 – Adrian Borland (41), English singer, songwriter, guitarist (The Sound) (suicide)
- April 27
  - Al Hirt (76), New Orleans trumpeter
  - Maria Stader (87), operatic soprano
- April 30 – Darrell Sweet (51), drummer (Nazareth), heart attack
- May 8 – Leon Thomas (61), jazz singer
- May 14 – William Tucker, guitarist, Ministry, suicide by slitting own throat
- May 17 – Bruce Fairbairn (49), producer
- May 18 – Augustus Pablo (44), reggae producer and instrumentalist (collapsed lung)
- May 26 – Paul Sacher (93), Swiss conductor
- May 30 – Don Harper, Australian jazz violinist and composer (cancer)
- June 5 – Mel Tormé, (73), American singer
- June 6 – Lisy Fischer, (98), Swiss pianist, child prodigy
- June 15 – Fausto Papetti, (76), Italian saxophonist
- June 16 – Screaming Lord Sutch (58), UK musician
- June 21 – Kami, (27), Japanese drummer for Malice Mizer, subarachnoid hemorrhage
- June 27 – Sven Einar Englund, (83), Finnish composer
- July 1
  - Dennis Brown (42), reggae singer
  - Guy Mitchell (72), pop singer
- July 3 – Mark Sandman, (46), alternative rock musician, member of Morphine, heart attack
- July 6
  - Benny Bell, (93), musician
  - Joaquín Rodrigo (97), Spanish composer
- July 11 – Helen Forrest (82), big band singer
- July 13 – Louise Caselotti (88), operatic mezzo-soprano
- July 17 – Kevin Wilkinson (41), drummer (suicide by hanging)
- July 22 – Gar Samuelson (41), American drummer (liver failure)
- July 27 – Harry "Sweets" Edison (83), jazz trumpeter
- July 29 – Anita Carter (66), country and folk singer
- August 3 – Leroy Vinnegar (71), jazz bassist (heart attack)
- August 20 – Bobby Sheehan (31), bassist for Blues Traveler (drug overdose)
- August 25 – Rob Fisher (42), keyboardist and songwriter (cancer)
- September 8 – Moondog (83), avant-garde musician
- September 10
  - Beau Jocque (46), zydeco musician
  - Alfredo Kraus (72), opera singer
- September 17 – Frankie Vaughan (71), British singer
- October 3 – Hilario González (79), Cuban composer, pianist, musicologist, music educator, and music critic
- October 4 – Art Farmer (71), jazz trumpeter
- October 6 – Amalia Rodrigues (79), Portuguese singer
- October 9 – Milt Jackson (76), jazz vibraphonist
- October 12 – Frank Frost (63), blues harmonica player
- October 15 – Josef Locke (82), Irish tenor
- October 16 – Ella Mae Morse, (75), singer
- October 19 – Harry Bannink (70), Dutch songwriter
- October 26
  - Hoyt Axton (61), country music singer/songwriter (heart attack)
  - Rex Gildo (63), German singer
- October 28 – Robert Linn (74), composer and teacher
- November 8 – Lester Bowie (58), jazz trumpet player and composer
- November 13 – Donald Mills (84), American singer (Mills Brothers)
- November 18 – Doug Sahm (58), country and rock musician
- November 21 – Marie Kraja (88), operatic and folk singer
- December 2 – Charlie Byrd (74), jazz guitarist
- December 3 – Scatman John (57), pop musician
- December 6 – Todd Barnes (34), T.S.O.L.
- December 10 – Rick Danko (56), rock singer in The Band (drug-related heart failure)
- December 17 – Grover Washington Jr. (56), American saxophonist
- December 18 – Joe Higgs (59), reggae musician
- December 20 – Hank Snow (85), country music artist
- December 26 – Curtis Mayfield (57), singer/composer

== Awards ==
- The following artists are inducted into the Rock and Roll Hall of Fame: Billy Joel, Curtis Mayfield, Paul McCartney, Del Shannon, Dusty Springfield, Bruce Springsteen and The Staple Singers
- Inductees of the GMA Gospel Music Hall of Fame include The Fairfield Four and Second Chapter of Acts

=== Grammy Awards ===
- 41st Annual Grammy Awards

=== Country Music Association Awards ===
- 1999 Country Music Association Awards

=== Eurovision Song Contest ===
- Eurovision Song Contest 1999

=== Mercury Music Prize ===
- Ok – Talvin Singh wins.

=== MTV Video Music Awards ===
- 1999 MTV Video Music Awards

=== Glenn Gould Prize ===
- Yo-Yo Ma (laureate), Wu Man (protégé)

== Charts ==
=== Triple J Hottest 100 ===
- Triple J Hottest 100, 1999
- Pop Culture Madness 1999 Pop Music Chart

== See also ==
- 1999 in music (UK)
- 1999 in Norwegian music
- Category:Record labels established in 1999
