= I Know a Secret =

I Know a Secret or I Know the Secret may refer to:

- I Know a Secret, film directed by Bruce Pittman 1982
- I Know a Secret, List of programs broadcast by ABC (Australian TV network)
- I Know a Secret (Ginny Owens album) 2014
- I Know a Secret, compilation album by Erskine Hawkins
- I Know the Secret, album by Medical Mission Sisters 1967
- "I Know the Secret", title song from the album by Medical Mission Sisters 1967
- "I Know a Secret", song by Erskine Hawkins, covered by Spike Jones
