= Bamboleo =

Bamboleo (Spanish, 'I sway') may refer to:

- Bamboleo (band), a Cuban salsa band
- Bamboleo, a nickname for Eudalio Arriaga, Colombian football player
- "Bamboleo", a 2022 song by Red Velvet
- "Bamboleo", a 1997 song by Garcia
- "Bamboléo", a 1987 song by Gipsy Kings
- "Bamboleô", a 1931 song composed by André Filho
