= Winter Light (disambiguation) =

Winter Light is a Swedish drama film written and directed by Ingmar Bergman.

Winter Light may refer to:

- Winter Light (Linda Ronstadt album)
- Winter Light (Yanni album)
- Winter Light, a 2017 episode of Elements, from the television series Adventure Time
