= Francisco Martínez =

Francisco Martínez may refer to:

- Francisco Martínez (basketball) (1910–1993), Mexican basketball player, competed for Mexico at the 1936 Summer Olympics
- Francisco Martínez (boxer) (born 1976), Mexican Olympic boxer
- Francisco Martínez de Baeza (fl. 1634–1639), colonial governor of New Mexico from 1634 to 1637
- Francisco Martínez Marina (1754–1833), Spanish jurist, historian and priest
- Francisco Martínez Soria (1902–1982), Spanish actor
- Francisco Martínez de la Rosa (1787–1862), Spanish statesman and dramatist
- Francisco Martínez (footballer, born 1986), Argentine footballer
- Francisco Martínez (footballer, born 1988), Andorran footballer
- Francisco Martínez (footballer, born 1990), Argentine footballer
- Kiko Martínez (born 1984), Spanish professional boxer
- Francisco Martínez Martínez (born 1950), Mexican politician
- Francisco José Martínez (born 1983), Spanish cyclist
- Francisco Martínez Romero (1993–2021), Chilean protester and juggler
