= Something More (Ginny Owens album) =

Studio album by Ginny Owens
- Released: March 19, 2002
- Studio: Spank Factory and Screaming Baby Studio (Franklin, Tennessee): Bridgeway Studios (Nashville, Tennessee)
- Genre: Contemporary Christian music
- Length: 41:18
- Label: Rocketown
- Producer: Monroe Jones

Ginny Owens chronology
Without Condition (1999)	Something More (2002)	Beautiful (2004)

Professional ratings
Review scores
Source	Rating
Jesus Freak Hideout	4/5 stars

Something More is the second album by contemporary Christian music artist, Ginny Owens. The album was released on March 19, 2002, by Rocketown Records. It peaked at No. 21 on the Billboard Christian Albums chart and No. 22 on their Heatseekers chart.

== Track listing ==
No.	Title	Writer(s)	Length
1.	"Prelude"	Ginny Owens	1:05
2.	"With Me"	Ginny Owens; Trevor Morgan	3:22
3.	"Run to You"	Ginny Owens	4:42
4.	"I Am"	Ginny Owens; Dwight Liles	3:05
5.	"Something More"	Ginny Owens; Trevor Morgan	3:01
6.	"This Road"	Ginny Owens; Kyle Matthews	4:16
7.	"I Know Someone"	Ginny Owens; Dwight Liles	3:49
8.	"Simply Love You"	Ginny Owens; Tony Wood	2:55
9.	"The Hand"	Ginny Owens; Kendall Combs; Will Hunt	3:41
10.	"True Story"	Ginny Owens; Scott Dente	4:22
11.	"All I Want to Do"	Ginny Owens; Dwight Liles	4:29
12.	""Be Still, My Soul" (hymn)"	Jean Sibelius; Catharina von Schlegel	2:31
Total length:			41:18

== Personnel ==
=== Musicians ===
- Ginny Owens – vocals, acoustic piano, arrangements (12)
- Jeff Roach – keyboards
- Greg Herrington – programming (1–4, 6, 7, 8, 10–14)
- Chris Mosher – programming (5)
- Will Hunt – programming (9)
- Gary Burnette – guitars
- George Cocchini – guitars
- Scott Denté – guitars
- Kendall Combes – guitars (9)
- Dan Dugmore – steel guitar
- Mark Hill – bass
- Ken Lewis – percussion
- John Mark Painter – string arrangements and conductor
- John Catchings – cello
- Kristin Wilkinson – viola
- David Angell – violin
- David Davidson – violin

=== Production ===
- Monroe Jones – producer
- Don Donahue – executive producer
- Jim Dineen – recording
- Russ Long – recording
- Tom Laune – mixing
- Steve Lotz – mix assistant
- Hank Williams – mastering at MasterMix (Nashville, Tennessee)
- Jamie Kiner – production manager
- Jimmy Abegg – image control, photography
- Scott Cornett – creative manager
- Frank W. Ockenfels 3 – photography
- Room 120 – design, illustration
- Fleming McWilliams – stylist
- Melanie Shelley – stylist

Track information and credits adapted from the album's liner notes.

== Charts ==
Chart (2002)	Peak position
US Christian Albums (Billboard)	21
US Heatseekers Albums (Billboard)	22
