= Forbidden Dreams (album) =

Forbidden Dreams: Encore Collection, Volume 2

Compilation album by Yanni
- Released: September 21, 1998
- Genre: Instrumental
- Length: 33:11
- Label: BMG Special Products
- Producer: Yanni

Yanni chronology
Tribute (1997)	Forbidden Dreams: Encore Collection, Volume 2 (1998)	Love Songs (1999)

Forbidden Dreams: Encore Collection, Volume 2 is a compilation album by Greek keyboardist and composer Yanni, released on BMG Special Products label in 1998. It peaked at #7 on Billboard's "Top New Age Albums" chart in 1999.

== Critical reception ==
Professional ratings
Review scores
Source	Rating
AllMusic	3/5 stars

In a review by Chuck Donkers of AllMusic, "Yanni's early albums for the Private Music label are mined for Forbidden Dreams, which spotlights his famously dramatic, even flamboyant synthesizer style in its embryonic stages; in addition to the title track, the compilation includes the fan favorites "After the Sunrise" and "Keys to Imagination" from the-80s."

== Track listing ==
No.	Title	Original album	Length
1.	"Forbidden Dreams"	Keys to Imagination (1986)	3:56
2.	"Aria"	Dare to Dream (1992)	3:58
3.	"Santorini"	Keys to Imagination	4:34
4.	"Nostalgia"	Keys to Imagination	4:29
5.	"After the Sunrise"	Out of Silence (1987)	4:38
6.	"Keys to Imagination"	Keys to Imagination	5:14
7.	"Until the Last Moment"	In My Time (1993)	6:22
