= I Know a Secret (Ginny Owens album) =

Studio album by Ginny Owens
- Released: November 10, 2014
- Genre: Contemporary Christian music, indie rock
- Length: 49:46
- Label: Word Records
- Producer: Monroe Jones, Jeff Pardo, Josh Bronleewe

I Know a Secret marks the ninth album by Ginny Owens. Word Records released the project on November 10, 2014.

== Reception ==
Professional ratings
Review scores
Source	Rating
365 Days of Inspiring Media	4/5 stars
CCM Magazine	4/5 stars
Christian Music Review	4.3/5
Jesus Freak Hideout	4/5 stars
New Release Tuesday	4.5/5 stars

Signaling in a four star review by CCM Magazine, Matt Conner realizes, "Owens has never sounded better." Kevin Davis, indicating in a four and a half star review at New Release Tuesday, recognizes, "I Know a Secret is Ginny's best album of her incredible career." Specifying in a four star review from Jesus Freak Hideout, Mark D. Geil responds, "I Know a Secret is a strong, solid return." Joshua Andre, awarding the album four and a half stars at 365 Days of Inspiring Media, says, "such a personal, emotional, and refreshing album". Rating the album 4.3 out of five for Christian Music Review, Laura Chambers writes, "I Know A Secret assures us that we, too, can have peace that rides the waves, rather than remaining ashore untested."

== Track listing ==
No.	Title	Writer(s)	Length
1.	"I Know a Secret"	Ginny Owens, Monroe Jones	3:36
2.	"Why My Life Is For"	Ginny Owens, Jeff Pardo, Molly Reed	3:26
3.	"I Will Praise You"	Ginny Owens, Cindy Morgan	3:11
4.	"Deeper"	Ian Eskelin, Ginny Owens, Tony Wood	2:57
5.	"Made for Love"	Ginny Owens	4:12
6.	"All Things"	Ginny Owens, Monroe Jones	3:25
7.	"No Borders"	Josh Bronleewe, Benji Cowart, Ginny Owens	3:20
8.	"In This Darkness"	Dwight Liles, Ginny Owens, Michael Puryear	4:15
9.	"O the Deep"	Samuel Francis	1:28
10.	"Stumblin'"	Monroe Jones, Dwight Liles, Ginny Owens, Michael Puryear	3:42
11.	"I am Yours"	Jamie Harvill, Ginny Owens	4:11
12.	"What You Believe"	Ginny Owens, Monroe Jones	4:08
13.	"Without You"	Ginny Owens	3:47
14.	"Don't Waste Your Life"	James Isaac Elliot, Ginny Owens, Andrew Ramsey	4:02
Total length:			49:46

== Personnel ==
- Ginny Owens – lead vocals, backing vocals, acoustic piano
- Jeff Roach – keyboards, acoustic piano, programming, drums, strings, string arrangements
- Josh Bronleewe – programming, electric guitar
- Jeff Pardo – acoustic piano, Wurlitzer electric piano, synthesizers, programming, acoustic guitar
- Kyle Buchanan – acoustic guitar, electric guitar, mandolin, ukulele
- Court Clement – electric guitar
- Scott Denté – electric guitar
- James Parker – acoustic guitar, electric guitar, mandolin, ukulele
- Mark Hill – bass
- Tony Lucido – bass
- Ken Lewis – drums, percussion
- John Catchings – cello
- Kristin Wilkinson – viola
- David Angel – violin
- David Davidson – violin, string arrangements
- Katie Bronleewe – backing vocals
- Brandon Payne – backing vocals
- Christi Griggs Dippel – backing vocals
- Brooke Dozier – backing vocals
- Tirzah Payne – backing vocals
- Erin Tierney – backing vocals
- Josh Tierney – backing vocals
