= Black Sails EP =

EP by AFI
- Released: April 27, 1999
- Genre: Punk rock
- Length: 11:50
- Label: Nitro
- Producer: AFI

AFI chronology
A Fire Inside EP (1998)	Black Sails EP (1999)	Black Sails in the Sunset (1999)

Black Sails EP is an extended play by the American rock band AFI. It was released on April 27, 1999, through Nitro Records. Only 5,000 copies were pressed. It is a sampler of the band's fourth studio album Black Sails in the Sunset.

== Background ==
The first three tracks can be found on the album Black Sails in the Sunset. On the full-length album, "Porphyria" is re-titled "Porphyria Cutanea Tarda" and contains a crossfade into the next track, "Exsanguination". "Who Knew?" is a B-side from the full-length album and appears on its Japanese edition. This is the first release with Jade Puget as an official member of the band.

== Track listing ==
All lyrics are written by Davey Havok; all music is composed by AFI.

No.	Title	Length
1.	"Porphyria"	2:09
2.	"Malleus Maleficarum"	4:04
3.	"The Prayer Position"	3:30
4.	"Who Knew?"	2:14

== Personnel ==
Credits adapted from liner notes.

- AFI – producer, arrangements, backing vocals
- Davey Havok – lead vocals, lyrics
- Jade Puget – lead guitar, programming, keyboard, piano, synthesizer, backing vocals
- Adam Carson – drums, percussion, backing vocals
- Hunter Burgan – bass, programming, keyboard, backing vocals
- Andy Ernst – engineer, mixing
- Alan Forbes – cover illustration
- Dexter Holland – additional guitar, backing vocals
- Thad LaRue – assistant engineer
- Gabe Morford – photography
- Jamie Reilly – layout

Studios

- Engineered and mixed at The Art of Ears, Hayward, CA
