= A Far Cry from Dead =

Compilation album by Townes Van Zandt
- Released: 1999
- Genre: Country, folk
- Label: Arista Austin
- Producer: Eric Paul

Townes Van Zandt chronology
In Pain (1999)	A Far Cry from Dead (1999)	Drama Falls Like Teardrops (2000)

A Far Cry from Dead is a posthumous album by Townes Van Zandt, released two years after the singer's 1997 death. It contains overdubbed instrumentation added to vocal and guitar recordings made by the late singer. It was Van Zandt's first album on a major label.

== Production ==
The recordings were constructed from DAT tapes provided to producer Eric Paul by the singer's widow, Jeanene. Richard Bennett played guitar on the album; Kenny Malone and Charlie McCoy also contributed to it.

"Squash" and "Sanitarium Blues" had never before been released.

== Critical reception ==
Professional ratings
Review scores
Source	Rating
AllMusic	3/5 stars
The Des Moines Register	4/5 stars
The Encyclopedia of Popular Music	4/5 stars
Entertainment Weekly	A
Los Angeles Times	3/4 stars
NME	3.5/5 stars
Rolling Stone	3.5/5 stars

Entertainment Weekly deemed the album "the best introduction yet to this master craftsman's dour magic." Texas Monthly thought that "the problem is that a producer and a bunch of studio musicians are filling the spaces in Van Zandt’s barren landscape with angel bells and precision acoustic guitars; the album feels like their creation, not his." The Los Angeles Times noted that "the essential track ... features the subtlest musical additions—'Waitin' 'Round to Die', written back in 1968, was spooky enough when the singer was young ... Here it sounds like a voice from beyond the grave saying, 'I told you so.'"

CMJ New Music Monthly acknowledged the "best intentions" behind the album, but called it "terribly uncharacteristic" of Van Zandt's work. The Des Moines Register stated that Van Zandt's "vocal performances are poignant and often chilling." Rolling Stone opined: "Occasionally, the producer's enthusiasm overpowers the beauty of Van Zandt's words; 'For the Sake of the Song' is better served by the plaintive reading of the 1969 original than by the booming version here."

AllMusic wrote that "the blunt reality of the aborted relationships in 'Many a Fine Lady,' for example, and the exalted freedom of 'To Live's to Fly' do more to broadcast his mastery than the magazine covers he always seemed to be overlooked for."

== Track listing ==
All songs written by Townes Van Zandt

1. "Dollar Bill Blues"
2. "To Live Is to Fly"
3. "Rex's Blues"
4. "Sanitarium Blues"
5. "Ain't Leavin' Your Love"
6. "Greensboro Woman"
7. "Snake Mountain Blues"
8. "Pancho and Lefty"
9. "For the Sake of the Song"
10. "Waiting Around to Die"
11. "Many a Fine Lady"
12. "Tower Song"
13. "Squash"

== Production ==
- Townes Van Zandt's original vocals and guitar tracks recorded at Texhoma Music Group Studio and Jack Clement's Cowboy Arms Hotel and Recording Spa, Nashville, TN, 1989–1996
- All other music recorded at Imagine Studio, Nashville, TN, 1998
- Mixed at the Music Mill and Battery Studio
- Mastered at Georgetown Masters using the HDCD process
- Mastered by Denny Purcell and Jonathan Russell
- Executive produced by Jeanene Van Zandt
- Engineer by Jed Hackett, Jim Skinner, and Niles Clement
