= Songs from the Heart (Yanni album) =

Compilation album by Yanni
- Released: June 10, 1999
- Genre: Instrumental; Easy listening
- Length: 117:29
- Label: BMG
- Producer: Yanni

Yanni chronology
Love Songs (1999)	Songs from the Heart (1999)	Someday (1999)

Professional ratings
Review scores
Source	Rating
AllMusic	2.5/5 stars

Songs from the Heart is a compilation album by Greek keyboardist and composer Yanni, released on the BMG label in 1999.

== Track listing ==
Disc 1

No.	Title	Original album	Length
1.	"Aria"	Dare to Dream (1992)	3:58
2.	"In the Morning Light"	In My Time (1993)	3:48
3.	"One Man's Dream"	In My Time	2:42
4.	"Once Upon a Time"	Dare to Dream	3:50
5.	"Enchantment"	In My Time	3:52
6.	"Face in the Photograph"	Dare to Dream	3:46
7.	"Forbidden Dreams"	Keys to Imagination (1986)	3:58
8.	"The Mermaid"	Out of Silence (1987)	3:48
9.	"Secret Vows"	Out of Silence	3:58
10.	"Paths on Water"	Out of Silence	3:53
11.	"A Word in Private"	Chameleon Days (1988)	3:49
12.	"First Touch"	Niki Nana (1989)	2:58
13.	"Sand Dance"	Out of Silence	5:11

Disc 2

No.	Title	Original album	Length
1.	"Santorini"	Live at the Acropolis (1994)	6:45
2.	"Forgotten Yesterdays"	Keys to Imagination	3:28
3.	"Within Attraction"	Live at the Acropolis	7:44
4.	"Song for Antarctica"	Polar Shift (1991) (non-Yanni album)	4:23
5.	"Keys to Imagination"	Live at the Acropolis	7:34
6.	"Standing in Motion"	Out of Silence	5:20
7.	"After the Sunrise"	Out of Silence	4:38
8.	"Acroyali"	Out of Silence	5:08
9.	"Reflections of Passion"	Live at the Acropolis	5:01
10.	"Looking Glass"	Keys to Imagination	6:40
11.	"Nostalgia"	Live at the Acropolis	5:36
12.	"Chasing Shadows"	Chameleon Days	5:42
