= Someday (Yanni album) =

Compilation album by Yanni
- Released: July 13, 1999
- Genre: Instrumental
- Length: 30:23
- Label: Unison
- Producer: Yanni

Yanni chronology
Songs from the Heart (1999)	Someday (1999)	Steal the Sky (1999)

Professional ratings
Review scores
Source	Rating
AllMusic	2.5/5 stars

Someday is a compilation album by Greek keyboardist and composer Yanni, released on the Unison label in 1999.

== Track listing ==
No.	Title	Original album	Length
1.	"Within Attraction"	Out of Silence (1987)	4:09
2.	"Enchantment"	In My Time (1993)	3:52
3.	"A Word in Private"	Chameleon Days (1988)	3:46
4.	"Before I Go"	In My Time	4:32
5.	"Felitsa"	Dare to Dream (1992)	4:52
6.	"Someday"	Niki Nana (1989)	4:35
7.	"The Rain Must Fall"	Live at the Acropolis (1994)	4:37
