= Marc Yu =

American musical child prodigy (born 1999)

- Born: January 5, 1999 (age 27); Monterey Park, California
- Genres: Classical
- Occupation: Musician
- Instruments: Piano, cello

Marc Yu (born January 5, 1999, in Monterey Park, California) is an American musician and former musical prodigy pianist who gained fame at a young age with his exceptional talent. He has significantly contributed to the classical music scene in America through his performances and appearances.

== Biography ==
Marc started playing the piano at the age of three years and 11 months, and the cello at the age of six. He began undertaking formal lessons later that year. Marc has perfect pitch.

Marc exhibited prodigiousness in academic subjects, and advanced to high school-level math at the age of seven. In 2005 he was awarded a Davidson Fellow scholarship, making him the youngest recipient of the bottom-tier award.

He has been featured on The Tonight Show with Jay Leno, The Ellen DeGeneres Show (in which he received an accordion), as well as being the focus of a National Geographic special titled "My Brilliant Brain".

His musical idol is Lang Lang, famous Chinese pianist. They have performed publicly together twice to date. Marc made his Proms debut with Lang Lang in London on 31 August 2008. They performed Schubert's Fantasia in F minor for piano duet, D. 940. Marc made his Carnegie Hall debut on October 27, 2009, when he again performed the Schubert Fantasia with Lang Lang.

He was homeschooled by his mother, who taught him English, Mandarin, and Cantonese Chinese, including Chinese calligraphy.

Marc lived in San Francisco with his family and attended The Nueva School.

As of 2017, Marc was majoring in film scoring at the Berklee College of Music.
