= Francisco Martínez (footballer, born 1986) =

Argentine footballer and manager

Personal information
- Full name: Francisco Daniel Martínez
- Date of birth: 4 April 1986 (age 40)
- Place of birth: Junín, Argentina
- Height: 1.82 m (5 ft 11 1/2 in)
- Position: Defender

Team information
- Current team: Sarmiento (reserve manager)

Senior career*
Years	Team	Apps	(Gls)
2005–2008	Sarmiento		
2008–2009	Arsenal de Sarandí	0	(0)
2009–2010	Sportivo Italiano	4	(0)
2011	Sarmiento		
2012	Temperley	16	(2)
2012	Brown	5	(0)
2013	Racing de Trelew		
2013	Defensores Unidos	9	(0)

Managerial career
- Sarmiento (reserve manager)
- * Club domestic league appearances and goals

Francisco Daniel Martínez (born 4 April 1986) is an Argentine football manager and former professional footballer who played as a defender. He is currently the reserve manager at Sarmiento.

== Playing career ==
Martínez started his career with local club Sarmiento, appearing three times as the club were relegated from the 2004–05 Primera B Nacional; he remained for three further years in Primera B Metropolitana. Argentine Primera División side Arsenal de Sarandí completed the signing of Martínez in 2008, though the defender departed a year later without featuring for their senior team. In 2009, Martínez joined Primera B Nacional's Sportivo Italiano. Four fixtures arrived, including his debut on 29 November against Unión Santa Fe. He had a stint back with Sarmiento in 2011, which took his overall tally there to forty-six matches and four goals.

2012 saw Temperley of Primera B Metropolitana sign Martínez. He scored goals versus Villa San Carlos and Brown in 2011–12 as they finished fifteenth. At the conclusion of that campaign, Martínez agreed to play for Brown in tier three. He was selected five times by manager Pablo Vicó, before leaving midway through 2012–13 to join Racing de Trelew in Torneo Argentino B. In June 2013, Martínez signed with Primera C Metropolitana side Defensores Unidos. Nine appearances followed. He was released in December 2013.

== Coaching career ==
After retiring, Martínez became the manager of Sarmiento's reserves. He guided them to the Apertura title in the Liga Deportiva del Oeste in 2018.

== Career statistics ==
Club statistics
Club	Season	League			Cup		League Cup		Continental		Other		Total	
Club	Season	Division	Apps	Goals	Apps	Goals	Apps	Goals	Apps	Goals	Apps	Goals	Apps	Goals
Sarmiento	2004–05	Primera B Nacional	3	0	0	0	—		—		0	0	3	0
Arsenal de Sarandí	2008–09	Primera División	0	0	0	0	—		0	0	0	0	0	0
Sportivo Italiano	2009–10	Primera B Nacional	4	0	0	0	—		—		0	0	4	0
Temperley	2011–12	Primera B Metropolitana	16	2	0	0	—		—		0	0	16	2
Brown	2012–13	Primera B Metropolitana	5	0	1	0	—		—		0	0	6	0
Defensores Unidos	2013–14	Primera C Metropolitana	9	0	0	0	—		—		0	0	9	0
Career total			37	0	1	0	—		0	0	0	0	38	0
