= Garcia (band) =

German Eurodance band

- Origin: Germany
- Genres: Eurodance, Latin
- Years active: 1996–present
- Labels: CDL – Maad Records, DunaBeats
- Member of: Sunny Tsvetelina Marinova Vocals, Marc Svetoslav Klincharov Vocals, Francesco Martinez Keyboard
- Past members: Frank Müller; Michael Eisele
- Website: www.duna-beats.com

Garcia is a German Eurodance project formed in 1996. They released six singles, two of which reached the top 20 in Germany and charted in Austria and Switzerland.

== Band history ==
Antonio Berardi was radio musician at the beginning of his career and owned a home studio. The guitarist, drummer and trumpeter initiated the Garcia project in the mid-1990s, which in 1996 had a surprise in the German, Austrian and Swiss charts with Vámonos. Co-hosts were Frank Müller, who was also a member of band C-Block, and Michael Eisele. The group's producer was Alex Christensen, creator of, among others, the well-known group U96.

It followed with Te quiero, Latina another charter success in Germany. In the year 1997, Bamboleo joined the success of Vámonos . Also La vida Bonita and Kalimba de luna placed themselves in 1998 and 1999 in different Hitparades. At the end of the 1990s, interest in Garcia's danceable Latin pop fell, and Imagine flopped. There was no further publication.

The first single, "Vámonos" featured Daisy Dee on vocals. The song was composed by Carlos Canzini, Pedro Carrera, Francisco Martínez, and Ángel Valdez.

In year 1997, the group shifted its musical genre, adopting a style closer to Euro-Reggae. It was followed by the singles "Bamboleo" "La Vida Bonita" and "Kalimba De Luna" were written by composer and singer Ron D., singer Raquel Gómez, Giora Aparente and Michael Eisele. Vocals were performed again by Rod D. and Raquel Gómez, the lead vocal of group.

In the year 1999 Rod.D was replaced by rapper singer Rob Money, while vocalists "Daniela" and "Eva" replaced Raquel Gómez, the original vocalist.

All songs were recorded under the parent label WEA Records (Warner Music Germany GmbH), under subsidiary brand Maad Records.

After a few years of silence, García released a new single in year 2000 called Imagina. The singer was the face of Tunisian and a German singer Ouided Khachnaoui in new project to reform and rebrand the original formation. Other relevant members and collaborators include Giora Schein, Boris Bruchhaus, Matthias Geist, the composer Michael Eisele, Rodney Hardison and Frank Müller. The real names associated with the project are S.Datta and M. De Stefani.

In the year 2004, the release of a remix of his hit song Bamboleo was planned, along with a new album, a project about which nothing more was ever heard.

Garcia is now represented and produced by the record label DunaBeats, led by Frank Müller.Since 2026, the new line-up has consisted of Sunny and Marc.

The new line-up will make its live debut on 28 June 2026 at the German ZDF TV Show Fernsehgarten.This will be followed by appearances at the Nibirii Festival and the Frankfurt Museumsuferfest in August 2026, among others. According to the label, new music productions for Garcia are planned for 2026.

== Discography ==
=== Music albums ===
- Dance Bamboleo (WEA Records / Maad Records, 1997)
- Dance Bamboleo (Japanese version) (WEA Records / Maad Records, 1998)
- The Japanese version of Dance Bamboleo includes the following songs

1. Bamboleo (Radio Edit) 2. Bamboleo (Bambo Mix) 3. Bamboleo (Extended Mix) 4. Bamboleo (Full Moon Mix) 5. Vamonos (Single Mix) 6. Vamonos (Extended Mix) 7. Vamonos (Salsa House Mix) 8. Vamonos (Amnesia Hard Mix) 9. Vamonos (Frank's House Mix) 10. Te Quiero, Latina (Single Edit) 11. Te Quiero, Latina (Extended Version) 12. Te Quiero, Latina (Alternative Mix) 13. Te Quiero, Latina (Hard Dub Mix)

=== Singles ===
| Year | Single | Peak chart positions | | | Album |
| Year | Single | AUT | GER | SUI | Album |
|---|---|---|---|---|---|
| 1996 | "Vámonos (Hey Chico are You Ready)" | 25 | 8 | 20 | Singles only |
| 1996 | "Te Quiero, Latina" | — | 85 | — | Singles only |
| 1997 | "Bamboleo" | 31 | 14 | 8 | Singles only |
| 1998 | "La Vida Bonita" | — | 51 | 38 | Singles only |
| 1999 | "Kalimba de Luna" | — | 49 | — | Singles only |
| 1999 | "Imagine" | — | — | — | Singles only |
"—" denotes releases that did not chart
