= Without Condition =

Studio album by Ginny Owens
- Released: July 20, 1999
- Studio: Deer Valley Studios, Criminal Recording and Screaming Baby Studio (Franklin, Tennessee); Bridgeway Studios (Nashville, Tennessee).
- Genre: Contemporary Christian
- Label: Rocketown
- Producer: Monroe Jones

Ginny Owens chronology
Without Condition (1999)	Something More (2002)

Professional ratings
Review scores
Source	Rating
AllMusic	4.5/5 stars

Without Condition is the debut album by contemporary Christian music singer Ginny Owens. It charted two Billboard album charts, peaking at number 39 on the Heatseekers Albums chart and number 25 on the Top Contemporary Christian music chart. The song "If You Want Me To" became her signature song.

To celebrate the album's twentieth anniversary in 2019, Owens release six videos of reflections songs from the album. Some videos feature people who contributed to the album, such as Michael W. Smith and Don Donahue.

== Track listing ==
All tracks are written by Ginny Owens, unless otherwise noted.

No.	Title	Writer(s)	Length
1.	"Be Thou My Vision"	Traditional Irish hymn	1:34
2.	"I Wanna Be Moved"	Ginny Owens; Michael Puryear	3:24
3.	"Without Condition"		2:54
4.	"Free"		3:29
5.	"If You Want Me To"	Ginny Owens; Kyle Matthews	3:35
6.	"Land of the Gray"		3:41
7.	"I Am Nothing"		4:01
8.	"Springs of Life"	Ginny Owens; Dwight Liles	3:59
9.	"Someone Searching"	Ginny Owens; Dwight Liles	3:18
10.	"Symbol of a Lost Cause"	Ginny Owens; Dwight Liles; Kyle Matthews	5:16
11.	"Own Me"		3:51

== Personnel ==
=== Musicians ===
- Ginny Owens – vocals, keyboards, acoustic piano
- Jeff Roach – keyboards, acoustic piano
- Michael W. Smith – keyboards, acoustic piano
- Gary Burnette – guitars
- Mark Hill – bass
- Greg Herrington – drums
- Dan Needham – drums
- Lisa Cochran – backing vocals
- Dennis Wilson – backing vocals
- Curtis Wright – backing vocals

=== Production ===
- Monroe Jones – producer
- Don Donahue – executive producer
- Michael W. Smith – executive producer
- Jim Dineen – engineer
- Eric Elwell – engineer
- Tom Laune – mixing
- Hank Williams – mastering at MasterMix (Nashville, Tennessee)
- Diana Lussenden – art direction, artwork, design, stylist

Track information and credits adapted from the album's liner notes.

== Charts ==
Chart (1999)	Peak position
US Top Christian Albums (Billboard)	25
US Heatseekers Albums (Billboard)	39
