= Dizzy (Goo Goo Dolls song) =

1999 single by Goo Goo Dolls

Single by Goo Goo Dolls

from the album Dizzy Up the Girl
- Released: February 5, 1999
- Length: 2:41
- Label: Warner Bros.
- Songwriter: John Rzeznik
- Producers: Rob Cavallo; Goo Goo Dolls

Goo Goo Dolls singles chronology
"Slide" (1998)	"Dizzy" (1999)	"Black Balloon" (1999)

Music video
- "Dizzy" on YouTube

"Dizzy" is a song by American band Goo Goo Dolls, written by lead vocalist and guitarist John Rzeznik. It was released as a single from their sixth studio album, Dizzy Up the Girl (1998), in February 1999. In Japan, an extended play (EP) titled Dizzy EP was released featuring this song as well as others from previous albums. "Dizzy" peaked at number nine on the US Billboard Modern Rock Tracks chart in May 1999 and also reached number 28 in Canada and number 50 in Australia. The single's music video stars actress Shannyn Sossamon.

== Track listings ==
Australian and European CD single

1. "Dizzy" – 2:41
2. "Slide" (acoustic version) – 3:18

Japanese EP

1. "Dizzy"
2. "Slide" (acoustic version)
3. "Naked" (remix)
4. "Long Way Down" (radio version)
5. "January Friend"

== Charts ==
=== Weekly charts ===
Chart (1999)	Peak position
Australia (ARIA)	50
Canada Top Singles (RPM)	28
Canada Rock/Alternative (RPM)	14
US Bubbling Under Hot 100 (Billboard)	8
US Adult Alternative Airplay (Billboard)	20
US Alternative Airplay (Billboard)	9
US Mainstream Rock (Billboard)	13

=== Year-end charts ===
Chart (1999)	Position
US Mainstream Rock Tracks (Billboard)	59
US Modern Rock Tracks (Billboard)	50

== Release history ==
Region	Date	Format(s)	Label(s)	Ref(s).
Japan	February 5, 1999	CD	Warner Bros.	
United States	February 15, 1999	Active rock; modern rock radio	Warner Bros.	
