= Love Songs (Yanni album) =

Compilation album by Yanni
- Released: April 13, 1999
- Genres: Instrumental; Easy listening
- Length: 50:19
- Label: Private Music
- Producer: Yanni

Yanni chronology
Forbidden Dreams: Encore Collection, Volume 2 (1998)	Love Songs (1999)	Songs from the Heart (1999)

Professional ratings
Review scores
Source	Rating
AllMusic	3/5 stars

Love Songs is a compilation album by Greek keyboardist and composer Yanni, released on the Private Music label in 1999. The album peaked at #1 on Billboard's "Top New Age Albums" chart and at #98 on the "Billboard 200" chart in the same year.

== Track listing ==
No.	Title	Original album	Length
1.	"In the Morning Light"	In My Time (1993)	3:50
2.	"So Long My Friend"	Dare to Dream (1992)	3:50
3.	"To the One Who Knows"	Dare to Dream	5:37
4.	"Almost a Whisper"	Reflections of Passion (1990)	3:10
5.	"Before I Go"	In My Time	4:31
6.	"In the Mirror"	Romantic Moments (1992)	4:08
7.	"First Touch"	Niki Nana (1989)	3:02
8.	"Enchantment"	In My Time	3:54
9.	"Felitsa"	Dare to Dream	4:54
10.	"Secret Vows"	Out of Silence (1987)	3:58
11.	"Whispers in the Dark"	In My Time	5:27
12.	"To Take... To Hold"	In My Time	3:58
