= Steal the Sky (soundtrack) =

Soundtrack album by Yanni
- Released: August 17, 1999
- Recorded: 1988
- Genre: Instrumental
- Length: 43:57
- Label: Rhino Entertainment
- Producer: Ford A. Thaxton

Yanni chronology
Someday (1999)	Steal the Sky (1999)	Winter Light (1999)

Professional ratings
Review scores
Source	Rating
AllMusic	3/5 stars

Steal the Sky is the soundtrack album for the HBO movie Steal the Sky, composed and performed by Yanni. It was released on the Rhino Entertainment label in 1999. The album peaked at #17 on Billboard's "Top New Age Albums" chart in the same year.

== Track listing ==
No.	Title	Length
1.	"Steal the Sky"	2:59
2.	"Fountain/Life Is Serious"	5:33
3.	"I'll Think About It/Fenesta Vaseia"	2:34
4.	"Baghdad Airport/Main Title"	4:25
5.	"Stealing the Jet"	6:28
6.	"Munir Flies the Jet"	4:29
7.	"Munir Lands the Plane"	8:54
8.	"Finale"	6:05
9.	"Nowhere Man (Bonus Cue)" (Writers: Lennon–McCartney)	2:30
Total length:		43:57

== Personnel ==
Music by Yanni. Published by Time Life Music (ASCAP). "Nowhere Man" (Lennon–McCartney) Published by SBK Blackwood Music Inc. Under license from ATV Music (MacLEN)

== Production ==
- Produced for Release by Ford A. Thaxton
- Project Supervision: Julie D'Angelo
- Remastering: Dan Hersch/Digiprep
- Project Assistance: Alexander Alvy, Emily Cagan
- Editorial Supervision: Steven Chean
- Art Direction & Design: Greg Allen
- Cover Photo of Yanni: Lynn Goldsmith
- Cover Photo Composite & Manipulation: Greg Allen
- Special Thanks: Bob Emmer, Bill Inglot, Randall D. Larson, Bob O'Neill, Glenn Whitehead & Daniel Yankelevits

(Production as described in CD liner notes.)
