= Ginny Owens =

American singer

- Born: Virginia Leigh Owens; 22 April 1975 (age 50)
- Origin: Jackson, Mississippi, U.S.
- Genres: CCM, pop
- Occupation(s): Singer, songwriter, philanthropist
- Years active: 1999–present
- Labels: Rocketown, Soul Stride/EMI Gospel
- Website: www.ginnyowensmusic.com

Virginia Leigh Owens (born April 22, 1975) is an American singer, songwriter, author, and speaker. She is known for performing Contemporary Christian music, but has more recently had her songs featured on WB, ABC TV shows, and independent films. Owens had three albums chart on Billboard albums charts in the 2000s.

== Early life and sight loss ==
Owens was born in Jackson, Mississippi, with poor eyesight and has been blind since the age of three. She explains:

And so I inherited everything from cataracts to glaucoma to just several things that were not great. And that but I did have a limited amount of sight so I could see people and colours. I was learning my colours. And when I went in for a surgery at three and it was what they call the cryotherapy treatment, which is kind of a freezing treatment. And the doctor thought it would sort of at least maintain my vision and turned out it actually took my vision away. Also it turned out he was not a good doctor.

Owens says she struggles less with blindness per se than with people's reactions to it.

== Career ==
She earned her bachelor of music education in 1997 from Belmont University, but found that most people were skeptical about hiring a blind music teacher. She entered the music business by writing songs for Michael Puryear's Final Four Publishing, which led to a number of labels competing for her, before she chose Rocketown Records. She concentrated in singing and songwriting and began making CDs, and has been producing them since 1999 with Rocketown Records, a label under Michael W. Smith. Owens won the Nashville "Lilith Fair '99 Talent Search", which earned her a spot singing at that year's festival, and the following year performed at the Sundance Film Festival.

Her music has been featured on television shows, such as Roswell and Felicity. Owens has also received three Dove awards, including New Artist of the Year (2000) and Inspirational Recorded Song of the Year (2001) for "Blessed" with Rachael Lampa and Cindy Morgan.

In 2005, Owens started a non-profit organization called the Fingerprint Initiative. The organization has worked in conjunction with other groups, such as Compassion International, International Justice Mission, and Habitat for Humanity. Owens was featured on national television, including NBC's Today Show and CNN, for her contribution to help rebuild New Orleans following Hurricane Katrina. Owens released Love Be the Loudest in 2016.

In 2015, Owens released her first book, Transcending Mysteries: Who Is God and What Does He Want From Us?, co-authored with Andrew Greer. Owens is the creator of "How I See It", a video series in which she invites people into her daily life as a blind person, and has served as an adjunct professor in the songwriting department at Belmont University.

In early 2017, Owens created the Love Be the Loudest campaign, whereby a portion of album sales go to support non-profits.

Owens' second book, Singing in the Dark, was released on May 1, 2021, through David C. Cook. In it, Owens "introduces the reader to powerful ways of drawing closer to God and how the elements of music, prayer, and lament offer rich, vibrant, and joyful communion with Him, especially on the darkest days."

== Discography ==
- Without Condition – July 20, 1999
- Something More – 2002
- Blueprint (EP) – 2002 (eight tracks; seven remixes, and a one-track preview of Beautiful)
- Beautiful – 2004
- Live From New Orleans – May 3, 2005
- Long Way Home – October 11, 2005
- If You Want Me To: The Best of Ginny Owens – August 8, 2006
- Bring Us Peace – 2006 (Christmas album)
- Say Amen (EP) – 2009 (three-track preview of Say Amen: Hymns and Songs of Faith)
- Say Amen: Hymns and Songs of Faith – October 20, 2009
- Ephemera (EP) – February 2, 2010 (six-track preview of Get In, I'm Driving)
- Get In, I'm Driving – September 13, 2011
- I Know a Secret – November 10, 2014
- Love Be the Loudest – November 18, 2016
- Expressions I: Radiant (EP) - November 20, 2020
- Expressions II: Wonder (EP) - February 12, 2021
- Sing Hope In the Darkness (EP) - May 14, 2021
- Be Still and Know (EP) - January 13, 2023
- Be Still and Know (Instrumental) (EP) - February 17, 2023
- Have Hope (Single) - May 31, 2023

== Charts ==
=== Albums ===
Album	Year	Chart	Peak position
Without Condition	1999	US Christian Albums (Billboard)	25
Without Condition	1999	US Heatseekers Albums (Billboard)	39
Something More	2002	US Christian Albums (Billboard)	21
Something More	2002	US Heatseekers Albums (Billboard)	22
Beautiful	2004	US Christian Albums (Billboard)	15
Beautiful	2004	US Heatseekers Albums (Billboard)	12
