= White Dawg =

American rapper (born 1974)

- Also known as: White Dawg
- Born: Billy Alsbrooks Jr. September 6, 1974 (age 51); Florence, Alabama, U.S.
- Genres: Dirty South
- Occupation: Rapper
- Years active: 1990–present
- Labels: Positive Worldwide, Joey Boy Records, Paper Chasers, White Dawg Records
- Website: billyalsbrooks.com

Billy Alsbrooks, Jr. formerly known by his stage name White Dawg, is a former American rapper, songwriter, and music producer. His recordings include the Billboard charting rap single "Restless" (#18 July 1999) off his first national landmark LP Thug Ride. He also produced for many Gold and Platinum artists during his music tenure (Rick Ross/Plies/Trick Daddy/Pastor Troy/Trina/Pitbull). White Dawg retired from the music industry following his father's death in late December 2007. In 2016, he wrote the book Blessed And Unstoppable: Your Blueprint For Success and is now a motivational speaker.

== Career ==
White Dawg was born in Florence, Alabama, the son of Muscle Shoals Sound Studio guitar player Billy Alsbrooks Sr. and musician Terrie Fleming. White Dawg moved to Fort Lauderdale, Florida, in 1989. He began distributing his music by giving away tapes at a local record store, Kotam Stereo, in the Oakland Park flea market, and joined the Jam Pony DJs. White Dawg attended the Fort Lauderdale Art Institute majoring in Music and Video Business.

White Dawg released his first national full-length album, Thug Ride, in 1999 on the independent record label Paper Chasers, which featured his 1999 single "Restless". Restless peaked at #18 on the Billboard Hot Rap Songs chart and was also highlighted in July 1999 as the Greatest Sales Gainer. He also produced for many Gold and Platinum artists during his music tenure (Rick Ross/Plies/Trick Daddy/Pastor Troy/Trina/Pitbull). In 2007, White Dawg released the song "Right Here". In 2007, White Dawg retired from the music industry after his dad died in late December.

In early 2008, Alsbrooks became a born-again Christian. In 2013, he graduated from Faith Christian University. Since leaving the music business, Billy became an international motivational speaker, top selling author, and an award-winning poet. He has released a book Blessed And Unstoppable: Your Blueprint For Success, and five "motivational" albums. His second book, titled Burning: The Inner Symphony of Fire, is set to be released sometime early 2021.

== Discography ==
=== White Dawg Rap Albums ===
- White Dawg: The Broward Playaz (1996)
- Slang That Thang (1997)
- Thug Ride (1999)
- Animosity (2002)
- Bonified Platinum (2004)
- ME vs. ME (2006)

=== White Dawg Rap Singles ===
- 1999: "Restless"
- 2002: "Pop a Pill"
- 2007: "Right Here"
