= Winter Light (Yanni album) =

Compilation album by Yanni
- Released: September 14, 1999
- Genre: Instrumental
- Length: 60:36
- Label: Private Music
- Producer: Yanni

Yanni chronology
Steal the Sky (1999)	Winter Light (1999)	The Private Years (1999)

Professional ratings
Review scores
Source	Rating
AllMusic	3/5 stars

Winter Light is a compilation album by Greek keyboardist and composer Yanni, released on the Private Music label in 1999. It peaked at #3 on Billboard's "Top New Age Albums" chart in the same year.

== Content ==
This album is a collection of popular songs by Yanni from many of his albums including Optimystique, Keys to Imagination, Out of Silence, Chameleon Days, Reflections of Passion, Dare to Dream and In My Time. This compilation is a remastered recordings.

== Track listing ==
No.	Title	Length
1.	"Forgotten Yesterdays"	3:30
2.	"Only a Memory"	4:18
3.	"Point of Origin"	5:58
4.	"Marching Season"	5:36
5.	"After the Sunrise"	4:38
6.	"Until the Last Moment"	6:21
7.	"Twilight"	7:33
8.	"Keys to Imagination"	5:14
9.	"A Word in Private"	3:44
10.	"True Nature"	4:30
11.	"The Magus"	4:45
12.	"Face in the Photograph"	3:48
