= Billboard year-end top 50 R&B singles of 1965 =

Billboard year-end top 50 R&B singles of 1965 is the year-end chart compiled by Billboard magazine ranking the top rhythm and blues singles of 1965. The list was based on charts from the January 30 through October 30.

The year's No. 1 R&B hit was "I Can't Help Myself (Sugar Pie Honey Bunch)" by the Four Tops which held the No. 1 spot for nine consecutive weeks from June 5 to July 31.

Because the list ends with the October 30 chart, it omits hit songs that peaked after October 30, including (i) Fontella Bass' "Rescue Me" which held the No. 1 spot for four consecutive weeks from October 30 to November 20, and (ii) James Brown's "I Got You (I Feel Good)" which held the No. 1 spot for four consecutive weeks from December 4 to December 25.

Year-end rank	Weekly peak	Title	Artist(s)	Label
1	1	"I Can't Help Myself (Sugar Pie Honey Bunch)"	Four Tops	Motown
2	1	"In the Midnight Hour"	Wilson Pickett	Atlantic
3	1	"Shotgun"	Junior Walker & The All Stars	Soul
4	6	"I Do Love You"	Billy Stewart	Chess
5	2	"Yes, I'm Ready"	Barbara Mason	Arctic
6	1	"Papa's Got a Brand New Bag"	James Brown	King
7	2	"The Tracks of My Tears"	The Miracles	Tamla
8	1	"We're Gonna Make It"	Little Milton	Checker
9	2	"Tonight's the Night"	Solomon Burke	Atlantic
10	1	"I'll Be Doggone"	Marvin Gaye	Tamla
11	3	"Nothing Can Stop Me"	Gene Chandler	Constellation
12	5	"Don't Mess Up a Good Thing"	Fontella Bass & Bobby McClure	Checker
13	1	"My Girl"	The Temptations	Gordy
14	2	"Stop! In the Name of Love"	The Supremes	Motown
15	3	"Oo Wee Baby, I Love You"	Fred Hughes	VeeJay
16	5	"Nowhere to Run"	Martha and the Vandellas	Gordy
17	4	"Since I Lost My Baby"	The Temptations	Gordy
18	13	"It's a Man Down There"	G. L. Crockett	Brothers
19	4	"Ooo Baby Baby"	The Miracles	Tamla
20	5	"Baby I'm Yours"	Barbara Lewis	Atlantic
21	2	"It's the Same Old Song"	Four Tops	Motown
22	1	"Got to Get You Off My Mind"	Solomon Burke	Atlantic
23	1	"Back in My Arms Again"	The Supremes	Motown
24	8	"Agent Double-O-Soul"	Edwin Starr	Ric Tic
25	3	"It's Growing"	The Temptations	Gordy
26	2	"The 'In' Crowd	Ramsey Lewis Trio	Cadet
27	2	"Shake"	Sam Cooke	RCA Victor
28	4	"Sitting in the Park"	Billy Stewart	Chess
29	4	"Twine-Time"	Alvin Cash & The Crawlers	Mar-V-Lus
30	6	"You're Gonna Make Me Cry"	O. V. Wright	Back Beat
31	1	"I Want To (Do Everything for You)	Joe Tex	Dial
32	7	"Ride Your Pony"	Lee Dorsey	Amy
33	7	"Shake and Fingerpop"	Junior Walker & The All Stars	Soul
34	3	"People Get Ready"	The Impressions	ABC-Paramount
35	6	"I Can't Work No Longer"	Billy Butler	Okeh
36	10	"Mr. Pitiful"	Otis Redding	Volt
37		"Unchained Melody"	The Righteous Brothers	Philles
38		"Teasin' You"	Willie Tee	Atlantic
39		"I've Been Loving You Too Long	Otis Redding	Volt
40		"Who's Cheating Who"	Little Milton	Checker
41		"Ask the Lonely"	Four Tops	Motown
42		"Hurt So Bad"	Little Anthony and the Imperials	DCP
43		"You've Lost That Lovin' Feelin'"	The Righteous Brothers	Philles
44		"When I'm Gone	Brenda Holloway	Tamla
45		"Boo-ga-loo"	Tom & Jerrio	ABC-Paramount
46		"Something You Got"	Chuck Jackson & Maxine Brown	Wand
47	7	"I Do"	The Marvelows	ABC-Paramount
48	9	"A Change Is Gonna Come"	Sam Cooke	RCA Victor
49	10	"The Entertainer"	Tony Clarke	Chess
50		"The Boy from New York City"	The Ad Libs	Blue Cat

== See also ==
- List of Top Selling Rhythm & Blues Singles number ones of 1965
- Billboard Year-End Hot 100 singles of 1965
- 1965 in music
