= Grits Ain't Groceries (album) =

Studio album by Little Milton
- Released: 1969
- Genre: Blues, R&B, soul
- Label: Checker

Little Milton chronology
| Sings Big Blues (1966) | Grits Ain't Groceries (1969) | If Walls Could Talk (1970) |

Grits Ain't Groceries is an album by the American musician Little Milton, released in 1969. It peaked at No. 159 on the Billboard 200, with the title track peaking at No. 13 on the Hot Rhythm & Blues Singles chart. Little Milton supported the album with a North American tour. Following the death of Leonard Chess, he left Checker Records for Stax Records. Little Milton also titled a 1972 live Stax album Grits Ain't Groceries.

== Production ==
The title track is a cover of the Little Willie John song, which Little Milton renamed to draw attention to the traditional Southern colloquialisms in the lyrics. "Just a Little Bit" was written by Roscoe Gordon. "Steal Away" is a version of Jimmy Hughes's song.

== Reception ==
Professional ratings
Review scores
| Source | Rating |
|---|---|
| All Music Guide to the Blues | 3/5 stars |
| The Encyclopedia of Popular Music | 3/5 stars |
| The Rolling Stone Jazz & Blues Album Guide | 4/5 stars |

The Oakland Post called Little Milton a "big-voiced blues balladeer with talent for injecting new excitement into almost forgotten R&B standards, [and] is doing some gritty shouting and smooth sweetness". The Los Angeles Times noted that "the five or six completely successful tracks are so resoundingly successful that it is easy to forget the routine moments."

The San Francisco Chronicle stated that Little Milton "has the combination of hardness and warmth in his voice that the best bluesmen have." The Evening Post labeled the sound "fresh, original soul". The St. Petersburg Times praised the "nifty guitar style". In 2006, The Penguin Guide to Blues Recordings likened Little Milton's "dry, wry delivery" to Lowell Fulson's. In 2011, Gregg Allman included the title track on a list of his top ten "blues vocal" songs.

== Track listing ==
Side 1

1. "Just a Little Bit"
2. "Grits Ain't Groceries (All Around the World)"
3. "I Can't Quit You, Baby"
4. "I'll Always Love You"
5. "Twenty Three Hours"

Side 2

1. "Spring"
2. "Steal Away"
3. "You're the One"
4. "So Blue Without You"
5. "Did You Ever Love a Woman"
