= No Ways Tired =

Studio album by Fontella Bass
- Released: 1995
- Genre: Soul, gospel
- Label: Nonesuch
- Producer: Wayne Horvitz

Fontella Bass chronology
Everlasting Arms (1991)	No Ways Tired (1995)	Now That I Found a Good Thing (1996)

No Ways Tired is an album by the American musician Fontella Bass, released in 1995. Issued as part of Nonesuch's American Explorer Series (which focused on traditional American roots music), the album marked a return to Bass's beginnings in gospel.

The album was nominated for a Grammy Award for "Best Traditional Soul Gospel Album".

== Production ==
No Ways Tired was produced by Wayne Horvitz. Lester Bowie, Harvey Brooks, and David Sanborn were among the musicians who contributed to the album. It includes covers of "Lean on Me" and "What the World Needs Now". Bass wrote "This Place I Call Home"; she also helped to arrange the songs.

== Critical reception ==
Professional ratings
Review scores
Source	Rating
AllMusic	2/5 stars
The Encyclopedia of Popular Music	3/5 stars
MusicHound Rock: The Essential Album Guide	4/5 stars
Houston Chronicle	3.5/5 stars
Rolling Stone	4/5 stars
Seattle Post Intelligencer	A−
Vancouver Sun	3/4 stars

David Whiteis of the Chicago Reader wrote that "Bass's soprano ascents are as thrilling as ever; her easy phrasing echoes immortals like Mahalia and Aretha; and her years spent immersed in everything from major-label pop to the Chicago Art Ensemble's outward-bound art music have given her an unusually broad stylistic and emotional range." Jon Pareles of The New York Times thought that Bass's "voice is undiminished: a trumpet that peals out optimism in gospel standards like 'This Little Light of Mine' and gospel-rooted pop like 'Lean on Me'."

Rick Mitchell of the Houston Chronicle noted, "On No Ways Tired, she presents gospel as an inseparable element of the black music continuum that includes jazz, blues and soul. Hymns such as Thomas Dorsey's 'This Little Light of Mine' and 'All My Burdens' are offset by the uplifting pop songs 'What the World Needs Now' and 'Lean on Me'... Bass' emotive singing demonstrates that 'Rescue Me' barely scratched the surface of her talent"; he later gave the album an honorable mention in his list of 1995's top albums. Steve Pick of the St. Louis Post-Dispatch remarked, "Blessed with an incredible voice, Bass has continued to learn how to work with it throughout her career, so that, at this point, she is singing better than ever. Fontella Bass is one of the great singers in American music, and this just might be the album that proves it best."

Roberta Penn of the Seattle Post Intelligencer said, "Fontella Bass makes a moving comeback with a set of hymns and inspirational songs, No Ways Tired. Produced by Seattle resident Wayne Horvitz, the 11-song set soars with polished but sensitive musicality, the kind that is seldom heard on a gospel album."

Andrew Hamilton of AllMusic wrote, "This is a well-executed release from Fontella Bass, the daughter of St. Louis gospel icon Martha Bass. She uses a more subdued voice than the wail she employed on "Rescue Me," a big hit in the '60s. The Institutional Radio Choir, David Sanborn's crying sax, and Lester Bowie's piercing trumpet assists Bass on 11 uplifting numbers...unlike Al Green, whose singing intensified when he reverted to gospel, Bass' gift has become more restrained."

== Track listing ==
No.	Title	Length
1.	"The Light of the World"
2.	"You Don't Know What the Lord Told Me"
3.	"No Ways Tired"
4.	"Everlasting Arms"
5.	"What the World Needs Now"
6.	"All My Burdens"
7.	"I Surrender All"
8.	"Lean on Me"
9.	"This Place I Call Home"
10.	"This Little Light of Mine"
11.	"I Must Tell Jesus"
