= The New Look =

The New Look may refer to:

- The New Look (style), a fashion style created by Christian Dior in 1947
- The New Look (album), a 1966 album by Fontella Bass
- The New Look (policy), an American defense policy instituted during the Eisenhower administration
- The New Look (TV series), an American biographical drama television series
