= The Great Pretender (Lester Bowie album) =

Studio album by Lester Bowie
- Released: 1981
- Recorded: June 1981
- Genre: Jazz
- Length: 42:44
- Label: ECM; ECM 1209
- Producer: Manfred Eicher

Lester Bowie chronology
The 5th Power (1978)	The Great Pretender (1981)	All the Magic (1982)

The Great Pretender is the eighth album by American jazz trumpeter Lester Bowie as leader, recorded in June 1981 and released on ECM later that year.

== Reception ==
The AllMusic review by Michael G. Nastos stated: "The Great Pretender is a perfect title for this effort, a mix of funk and humor, gospel and jazz, with no small points of reference to Dizzy Gillespie, early doo wop, Mahalia Jackson, James Brown, and Sun Ra... The Great Pretender falls just short of Bowie's magnum opus The 5th Power, but not by much in terms of sheer modernism. It's utterly enjoyable creative jazz, worthy of a space in your collection."

Professional ratings
Review scores
Source	Rating
AllMusic	4/5 stars
The Penguin Guide to Jazz Recordings	3/4 stars
The Rolling Stone Jazz Record Guide	2/5 stars

== Track listing ==
1. "The Great Pretender" (Buck Ram) – 16:22
2. "It's Howdy Doody Time" (Edward Kean) – 2:08
3. "When the Doom (Moon) Comes over the Mountain" (Harry M. Woods, Howard E. Johnson; Lester Bowie (arr.)) – 3:39
4. "Rios Negroes" (Bowie) – 7:17
5. "Rose Drop" (Bowie) – 7:28
6. "Oh, How the Ghost Sings" (Bowie, Donald Smith, Fred Williams, Phillip Wilson, Manfred Eicher, Martin Wieland) 5:50

== Personnel ==
- Lester Bowie – trumpet
- Donald Smith – piano, organ
- Fred Williams – bass, electric bass
- Phillip Wilson – drums

Additional musicians ("The Great Pretender")

- Hamiet Bluiett – baritone saxophone
- Fontella Bass – vocal
- David Peaston – vocal

Technical personnel

- Manfred Eicher – producer
- Martin Wieland – engineer
- Dieter Rehm – cover design, cover photography
- Helmut Frühauf – liner photography
