= All the Magic! =

Studio album by Lester Bowie
- Released: 1983
- Recorded: June 1982
- Genre: Jazz
- Length: 81:07
- Label: ECM; ECM 1246/47
- Producer: Manfred Eicher

Lester Bowie chronology
The Great Pretender (1981)	All the Magic! (1983)	I Only Have Eyes for You (1983)

All the Magic! / The One and Only is a double album by American jazz trumpeter Lester Bowie, recorded in June 1982 and released on ECM the following year—his second for the label. All the Magic! features a septet, with saxophonist Ari Brown, rhythm section Art Matthews, Fred Williams and Phillip Wilson, and singers Fontella Bass and David Peaston. The One and Only features solo trumpet improvisations from Bowie.

== Reception ==
The AllMusic review by Scott Yanow stated: "All in all, this two-fer shows off both Lester Bowie's playing abilities and his sense of humor."

Professional ratings
Review scores
Source	Rating
AllMusic	3/5 stars
The Penguin Guide to Jazz Recordings	2.5/4 stars
The Rolling Stone Jazz Record Guide	4/5 stars

== Track listing ==
All compositions by Lester Bowie, except as noted.

=== All the Magic! ===
1. "For Louie" (Wilson) - 12:14
2. "Spacehead" - 6:47
3. "Ghosts" (Ayler) - 3:09
4. "Trans Traditional Suite" - 15:51
5. "Let the Good Times Roll" (Shirley Goodman, Leonard Lee) - 6:47

=== The One and Only ===
1. "Organic Echo Part I" - 3:17
2. "Dunce Dance" - 2:05
3. "Charlie M. Part II" - 2:49
4. "Thirsty?" - 3:34
5. "Almost Christmas" - 3:52
6. "Down Home" - 2:40
7. "Okra Influence" - 4:38
8. "Miles Davis Meets Donald Duck" - 1:49
9. "Deb Deb's Face" - 2:03
10. "Monkey Waltz" - 1:47
11. "Fradulent [sic] Fanfare" - 1:01
12. "Organic Echo Part II" - 5:27

== Personnel ==
=== All the Magic! ===
- Lester Bowie – trumpet
- Ari Brown – tenor and soprano saxophones
- Art Matthews – piano
- Fred Williams – bass
- Phillip Wilson – drums
- Fontella Bass – vocals
- David Peaston – vocals

=== The One and Only ===
- Lester Bowie – trumpet and other sounds

=== Technical personnel ===
- Manfred Eicher – producer
- Martin Wieland – engineer
- Barbara Wojirsch – design
- Collis Davis – back cover photo
- Deborah Bowie – booklet photography (Lester Bowie)
- Peter Kemper – liner notes (German)
- Paul Foster – liner notes (English translation)
