= We're Gonna Make It =

We're Gonna Make It may refer to:

- "We're Gonna Make It (Little Milton song)", a 1965 song by Little Milton
- "We're Gonna Make It", a song by Billy Preston from his 1972 album Music Is My life
- "We're Gonna Make It", a song by the Pointer Sisters from their 1981 album Black & White
- "We're Gonna Make It", a song by Twisted Sister from their 1983 album You Can't Stop Rock 'n' Roll
- "We're Gonna Make It", a song by Damian Marley from his 2005 album Welcome to Jamrock
- "We're Gonna Make It", a song by LL Cool J from his 2006 album Todd Smith and Madea's Family Reunion
