= Mable John =

American blues singer (1930–2022)

- Born: November 3, 1930; Bastrop, Louisiana, U.S.
- Died: August 25, 2022 (aged 91) Los Angeles, California, U.S.
- Genres: Blues, R&B, gospel
- Instrument: Vocals
- Years active: 1960–2022
- Labels: Tamla (Motown), Stax

Mable John (November 3, 1930 – August 25, 2022) was an American blues vocalist and the first female artist signed by Berry Gordy to Motown's Tamla label.

== Biography ==
John was born in Bastrop, Louisiana, on November 3, 1930, the eldest of at least nine siblings. At a very young age, she and her parents, Mertis and Lillie (Robinson) John, moved north into Arkansas, where her father got a job in a paper mill near Cullendale. Here four of her brothers (including R&B singer Little Willie John) and two sisters were born.

In 1941, after her father was able to secure a better job, the family moved to Detroit, where two additional brothers were born. She attended Cleveland Intermediate School and then Pershing High School. After graduating, she took a job as an insurance representative at Friendship Mutual Insurance Agency, a company run by Berry Gordy's mother, Bertha.

Later, she left the company and spent two years at Lewis Business College. She subsequently ran into Mrs. Gordy again, who told Mable that her son, Berry, was writing songs and was looking for people to record them. Gordy began coaching her and would accompany John on piano at local engagements. This continued until 1959, when John performed at the Flame Show bar on John R Street at the last show that Billie Holiday did in Detroit, just weeks before Holiday's death.

The same year, John began recording for Gordy. First she was signed to United Artists, but nothing was released there. Eventually, she became one of the first artists signed to Tamla, Gordy's own label.

In 1960, she released her first Tamla single, "Who Wouldn't Love a Man Like That?", a romantic blues number, to no success. John followed with "No Love" in June of that year and then with "Actions Speak Louder Than Words" by year's end. While Motown was beginning to have success with acts like the Miracles and the Marvelettes (and later Martha & the Vandellas and the Supremes, both of whom had sung background vocals for John) that appealed to teenagers and young adults, it was making no impact in the established blues market. As a result, Gordy soon thinned out his roster of early blues artists. While John continued to be used as a background singer, Gordy dissolved her contract in 1962.

After leaving Motown, John spent several years as a Raelette, backing many Ray Charles hits. In 1966 she attempted a solo career again, signing with Stax Records. Her first single with the label was "Your Good Thing (Is About to End)". The song peaked at No. 6 on the R&B chart, and even managed to cross over onto pop radio, peaking at No. 95 there. She released six more singles for the label, none of which captured her first single's success. After leaving Stax Records in 1968, John rejoined the Raelettes for several years. She left secular music in 1973, and began managing Christian gospel acts, occasionally returning to the studio as a singer.

She released a single on the London-based Motown revival label Motorcity Records entitled "Time Stops" in 1991. In 1993, John earned a Doctor of Divinity degree from the south Los Angeles ministry Crenshaw Christian Center.

In 2006, John and David Ritz collaborated on a novel titled Sanctified Blues, about a former singer turned spiritual leader.

John played Bertha Mae, a veteran blues singer, in John Sayles' 2007 movie Honeydripper, and appeared in the 2014 Oscar-winning documentary 20 Feet from Stardom.

== Personal life ==
John's career, according to music historians, was "unjustly overshadowed" by her brother's recording career that started several years before Mable's.

In the late 1970s, John started a Los Angeles charity called "Joy Community Outreach to End Homelessness" that provided food and clothing to more than 100 people a day.

John died in Los Angeles on August 25, 2022, at the age of 91. Married several times, a complete list of survivors was not available at the time of her death.

== Awards ==
John received a Pioneer Award from the Rhythm and Blues Foundation in 1994.

== Discography ==
=== Albums ===
- Stay Out of the Kitchen (1966, Stax)

=== Singles ===
- "You Are Only My Love!" (1960)
- "Who Wouldn't Love a Man Like That?" (1960, Tamla)
- "(I Guess There's) No Love" (1960)
- "Actions Speak Louder Than Words" (1961)
- "Your Good Thing (Is About to End)" (1966, Stax) R&B: #6 US: #95
- "You're Taking Up Another Man's Place" (1966)
- "Same Time, Same Place" (1967)
- "I'm a Big Girl Now" (1967)
- "Don't Hit Me No More" (1967)
- "Able Mable" (1968)
- "Running Out" (1968)
- "Time Stops" (1991)
