= Duet (Lester Bowie and Phillip Wilson album) =

Studio album by Lester Bowie and Phillip Wilson
- Released: 1978
- Recorded: January 19, 1978
- Genre: Jazz
- Length: 33:57
- Label: Improvising Artists
- Producer: Paul Bley

Lester Bowie chronology
| Bugle Boy Bop (1983) | Duet (1978) | The 5th Power (1978) |

Duet is an album by trumpeter Lester Bowie and drummer Phillip Wilson, recorded in 1978 and released on the Improvising Artists label. It features three duet performances by Bowie and Wilson.

== Reception ==
The AllMusic review by Michael G. Nastos stated: "There is a certain static electricity generated in this series of three duets from trumpeter Bowie and drummer/percussionist Wilson. Certainly they feed off each other's energy in counterpointed reverie, but the music goes beyond being merely spontaneous or made up on the spot. The cohesion and musicality they employ is purely delightful and eminently listenable over this 40-minute span".

DownBeat assigned the album 4 stars. Reviewer Fred Bouchard wrote, "Wilson’s role here is more of collaborator than independent contractor; together with Bowie they construct a set that has sweep, majesty, and excitement aplenty".

Professional ratings
Review scores
| Source | Rating |
|---|---|
| AllMusic | 4/5 stars |
| DownBeat | 4/5 stars |
| The Penguin Guide to Jazz Recordings | 3/4 stars |
| The Rolling Stone Jazz Record Guide | 3/5 stars |

== Track listing ==
All compositions by Lester Bowie & Phillip Wilson

1. "Duet" - 2:40
2. "TBM" - 14:40
3. "Finale" - 15:36
- Recorded at Blue Rock Studio in New York City on January 19, 1978

== Personnel ==
- Lester Bowie – trumpet
- Phillip Wilson – drums
- David Baker – engineer
- Paul Bley – producer
