= List of Top Selling Rhythm & Blues Singles number ones of 1965 =

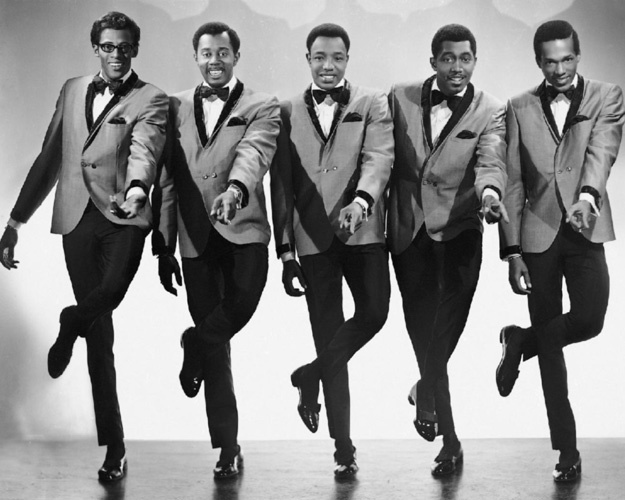
The Temptations were at number one with "My Girl" on the first R&B singles chart after it was revived by Billboard.

In 1965, Billboard published a chart ranking the top-performing singles in the United States in rhythm and blues (R&B) and related African American-oriented music genres; the chart has undergone various name changes over the decades to reflect the evolution of such genres and since 2005 has been published as Hot R&B/Hip-Hop Songs. The chart returned in the issue of Billboard dated January 30, 1965, having not been published since the issue dated November 23, 1963. No official explanation has ever been given as to why Billboard ceased producing R&B charts. Chart historian Joel Whitburn has contended that "there was so much crossover of titles between the R&B and pop singles (Hot 100) charts that Billboard considered the charts to be too similar". It was published under the title Hot Rhythm & Blues Singles through the issue dated May 29 and Top Selling Rhythm & Blues Singles thereafter; during the year, 13 different singles topped the chart.

When the R&B chart returned from its hiatus, the first number one was "My Girl" by the Temptations, which held the top spot for six consecutive weeks. The song was one of several of the year's chart-toppers to be released under the Motown label and its subsidiaries; Marvin Gaye, the Supremes and the Four Tops also reached number one in 1965 with singles released under the Detroit-based label. Motown, founded by Berry Gordy Jr in 1959, had released its first million-selling single two years later, and would go on to become one of the most successful and influential labels of the 20th century and bring unprecedented levels of mainstream success to Black music.

The Four Tops had the year's longest-running number one, spending nine consecutive weeks atop the chart with "I Can't Help Myself (Sugar Pie Honey Bunch)". James Brown was the act with the highest total number of weeks atop the chart during the year; he spent eight weeks at number one between August and October with "Papa's Got a Brand New Bag (Part 1)" and a further four weeks at number one with "I Got You (I Feel Good)", which reached number one in the issue of Billboard dated December 4 and stayed there for the remainder of the year. Brown, nicknamed "the Godfather of Soul", is regarded as one of the most influential Black musicians of all time and one of the most successful acts in the history of Billboard's R&B singles chart, with more than 100 of his songs having entered the listing. Gaye was the only other act to achieve more than one R&B number one in 1965, but both "I'll Be Doggone" and "Ain't That Peculiar" spent just a single week in the top spot.

== Chart history ==
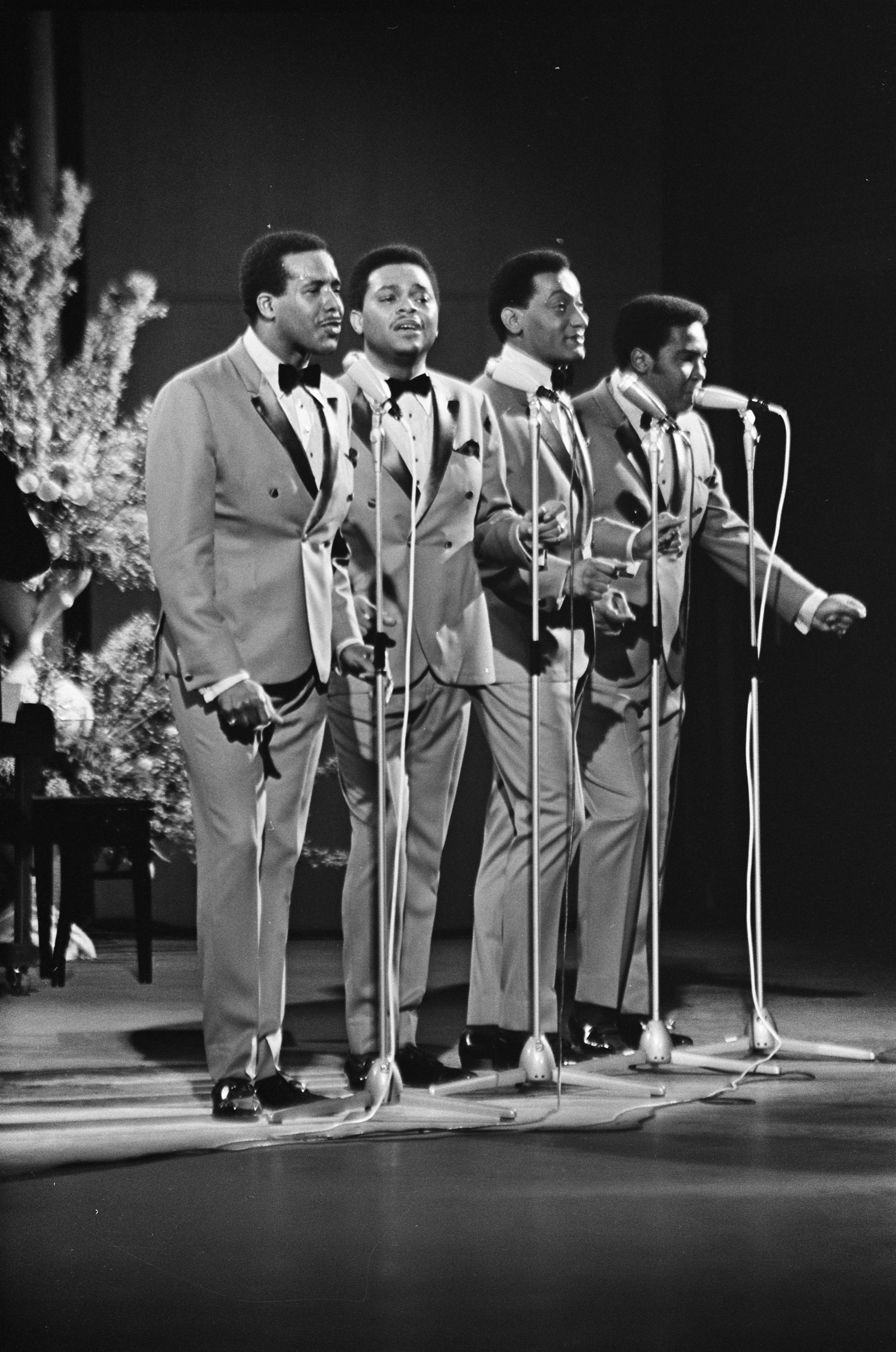
The Four Tops spent nine weeks at number one with "I Can't Help Myself (Sugar Pie Honey Bunch)".

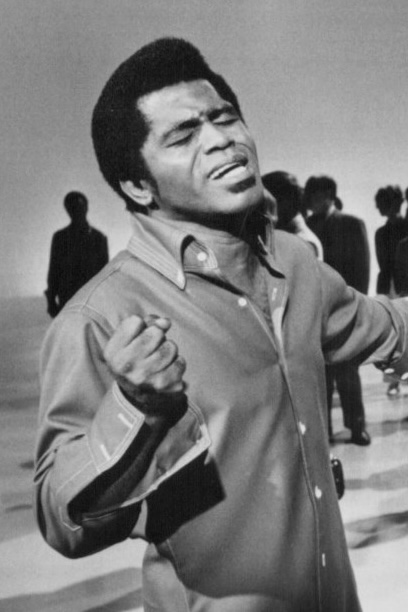
"Papa's Got a Brand New Bag (Part 1)" was a long-running chart-topper for James Brown, staying there for eight weeks.

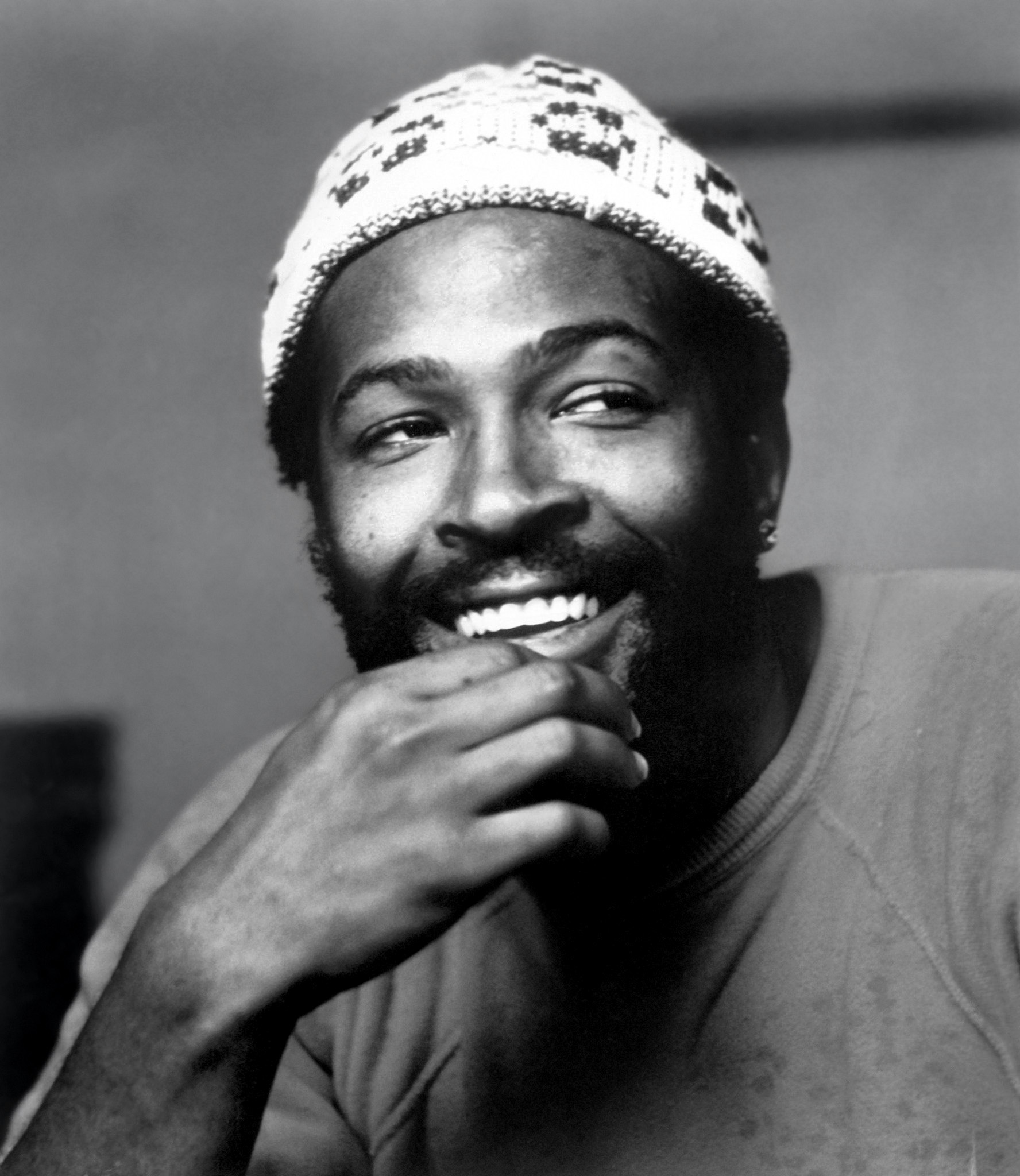
Marvin Gaye had two number ones ("I'll Be Doggone" and "Ain't That Peculiar") in 1965.

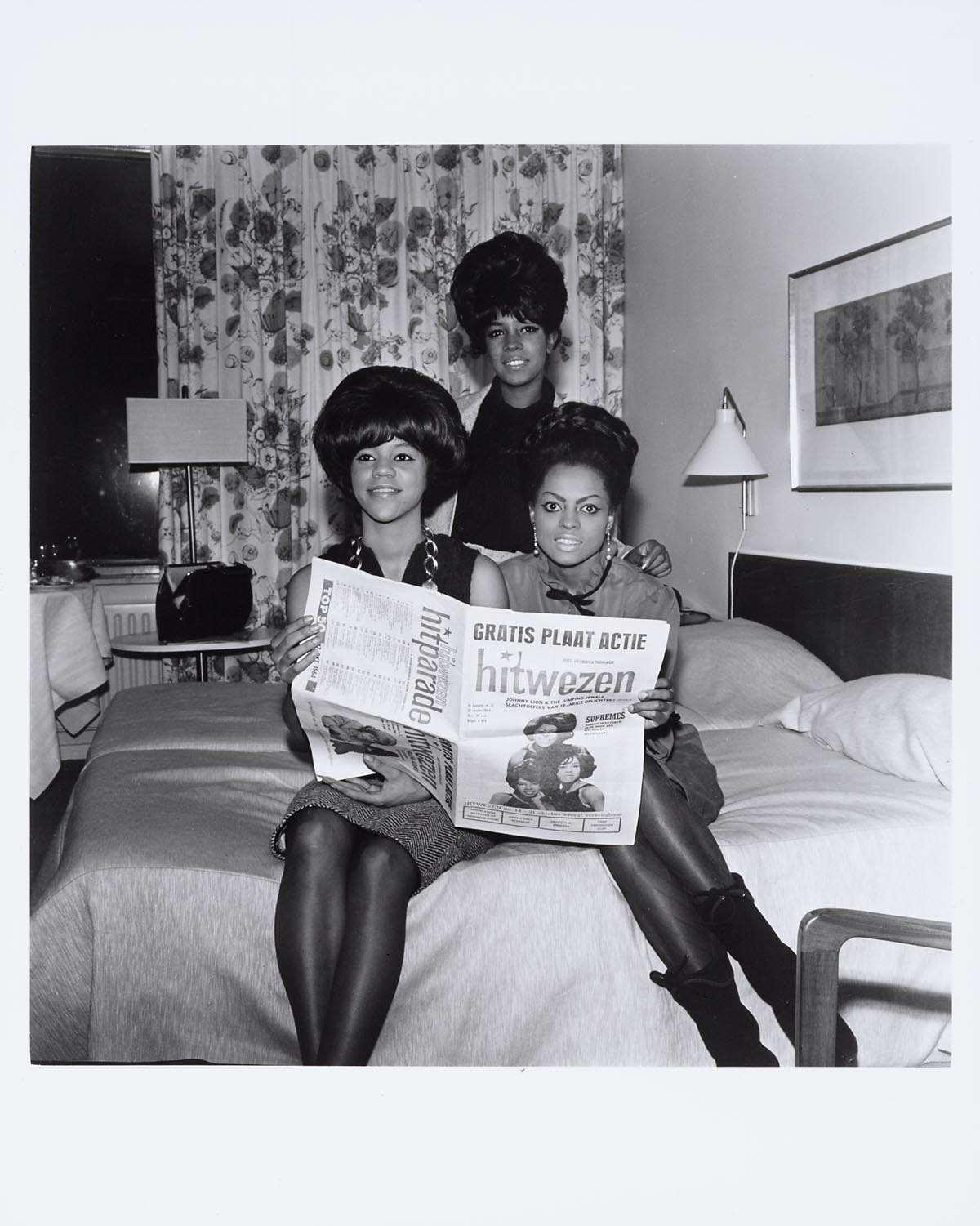
"Back in My Arms Again" was the first number one for the Supremes.

Key
†	Indicates best-charting R&B single of 1965

Chart history
Issue date	Title	Artist(s)	Ref.
January 30	"My Girl"	The Temptations	
February 6	"My Girl"	The Temptations	
February 13	"My Girl"	The Temptations	
February 20	"My Girl"	The Temptations	
February 27	"My Girl"	The Temptations	
March 6	"My Girl"	The Temptations	
March 13	"Shotgun"	Junior Walker & the All-Stars	
March 20	"Shotgun"	Junior Walker & the All-Stars	
March 27	"Shotgun"	Junior Walker & the All-Stars	
April 3	"Got to Get You Off My Mind"	Solomon Burke	
April 10	"Shotgun"	Junior Walker & the All-Stars	
April 17	"Got to Get You Off My Mind"	Solomon Burke	
April 24	"Got to Get You Off My Mind"	Solomon Burke	
May 1	"We're Gonna Make It"	Little Milton	
May 8	"We're Gonna Make It"	Little Milton	
May 15	"We're Gonna Make It"	Little Milton	
May 22	"I'll Be Doggone"	Marvin Gaye	
May 29	"Back in My Arms Again"	The Supremes	
June 5	"I Can't Help Myself (Sugar Pie Honey Bunch)" †	The Four Tops	
June 12	"I Can't Help Myself (Sugar Pie Honey Bunch)" †	The Four Tops	
June 19	"I Can't Help Myself (Sugar Pie Honey Bunch)" †	The Four Tops	
June 26	"I Can't Help Myself (Sugar Pie Honey Bunch)" †	The Four Tops	
July 3	"I Can't Help Myself (Sugar Pie Honey Bunch)" †	The Four Tops	
July 10	"I Can't Help Myself (Sugar Pie Honey Bunch)" †	The Four Tops	
July 17	"I Can't Help Myself (Sugar Pie Honey Bunch)" †	The Four Tops	
July 24	"I Can't Help Myself (Sugar Pie Honey Bunch)" †	The Four Tops	
July 31	"I Can't Help Myself (Sugar Pie Honey Bunch)" †	The Four Tops	
August 7	"In the Midnight Hour"	Wilson Pickett	
August 14	"Papa's Got a Brand New Bag (Part 1)"	James Brown	
August 21	"Papa's Got a Brand New Bag (Part 1)"	James Brown	
August 28	"Papa's Got a Brand New Bag (Part 1)"	James Brown	
September 4	"Papa's Got a Brand New Bag (Part 1)"	James Brown	
September 11	"Papa's Got a Brand New Bag (Part 1)"	James Brown	
September 18	"Papa's Got a Brand New Bag (Part 1)"	James Brown	
September 25	"Papa's Got a Brand New Bag (Part 1)"	James Brown	
October 2	"Papa's Got a Brand New Bag (Part 1)"	James Brown	
October 9	"I Want To (Do Everything for You)"	Joe Tex	
October 16	"I Want To (Do Everything for You)"	Joe Tex	
October 23	"I Want To (Do Everything for You)"	Joe Tex	
October 30	"Rescue Me"	Fontella Bass	
November 6	"Rescue Me"	Fontella Bass	
November 13	"Rescue Me"	Fontella Bass	
November 20	"Rescue Me"	Fontella Bass	
November 27	"Ain't That Peculiar"	Marvin Gaye	
December 4	"I Got You (I Feel Good)"	James Brown	
December 11	"I Got You (I Feel Good)"	James Brown	
December 18	"I Got You (I Feel Good)"	James Brown	
December 25	"I Got You (I Feel Good)"	James Brown	
