= Bugle Boy Bop =

Studio album by Lester Bowie & Charles "Bobo" Shaw
- Released: 1983
- Recorded: February 5, 1977
- Genre: Jazz
- Length: 40:43
- Label: Muse
- Producer: Michael Cuscuna

Lester Bowie chronology
Rope-A-Dope (1976)	Bugle Boy Bop (1983)	Duet (1978)

Bugle Boy Bop is an album by trumpeter Lester Bowie and drummer Charles "Bobo" Shaw recorded in 1977 and released on the Muse label in 1983. It features seven duet performances by Bowie and Shaw.

== Track listing ==
1. "Bugle Boy Bop" - 6:11
2. "Go Bo" - 6:00
3. "Cootie's Caravan Fan" - 3:55
4. "Latin Recovery" - 4:17
5. "The Girth Of The Cool" - 7:28
6. "Chop'n Rock" 6:29
7. "Finito, Benito" - 6:23

All compositions by Lester Bowie & Charles "Bobo" Shaw

- Recorded live at Studio Rivbea on February 5, 1977

== Personnel ==
- Lester Bowie – trumpet
- Charles "Bobo" Shaw – drums
