= I'm a Gambler =

Studio album by Little Milton
- Released: 1994
- Studio: Malaco
- Genre: Blues, R&B, soul
- Label: Malaco
- Producer: Tommy Couch, Wolf Stephenson

Little Milton chronology
Strugglin' Lady (1992)	I'm a Gambler (1994)	Welcome to the Club: The Essential Chess Recordings (1994)

I'm a Gambler is an album by the American musician Little Milton, released in 1994. It was nominated for a W. C. Handy Award for best "Soul/Blues Album". Little Milton promoted the album by touring the United States, Japan, and Europe.

== Production ==
The album was recorded at Malaco Studios, where Milton had final say over the songs he recorded. It includes covers of songs by Johnny Ace and Percy Mayfield, among others. "Like a Rooster on a Hen" was written by the Memphis songwriting partnership of Ben Shaw and John Ward.

== Critical reception ==
Professional ratings
Review scores
Source	Rating
AllMusic	4/5 stars
The Commercial Appeal	3/4 stars
The Encyclopedia of Popular Music	3/5 stars
MusicHound R&B: The Essential Album Guide	3.5/5 stars

The Commercial Appeal stated: "Backed by his smoking band, Little Milton Campbell takes a good-humored look at the latest Delta blues theme." The Chicago Tribune called the album "as satisfying as his classic 1960s R&B catalog for Chicago's Chess Records." The Advocate thought that "Casino Blues" "eyes heartbreak with a wink and a chuckle," and praised the "brassy, soulful style" of the album's other songs.

AllMusic wrote that "Milton sings with vigor, like he was feeling at the top of his game when he recorded this CD—and no wonder, since the material is quite strong."

== Track listing ==
No.	Title	Length
1.	"Casino Blues"
2.	"I've Got the Blues"
3.	"Poke Salad Annie"
4.	"Like a Rooster on a Hen"
5.	"Pledging My Love"
6.	"Love Is a Gamble"
7.	"That's All Right"
8.	"Baby Please"
9.	"You've Been Gone Too Long"
10.	"A Man Needs a Woman"
11.	"That's What a Good Woman Can Do"
