= Fontella Bass =

American R&B and soul singer (1940–2012)

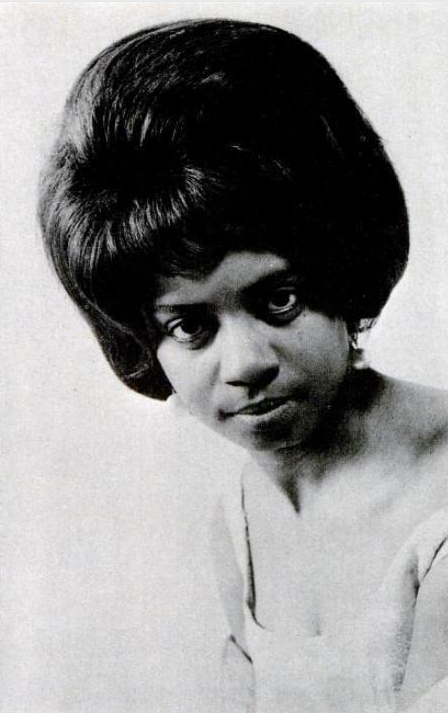
- Bass in 1965

Background information
- Born: Fontella Marie Bass; July 3, 1940; St. Louis, Missouri, U.S.
- Died: December 26, 2012 (aged 72) St. Louis, Missouri, U.S.
- Genres: R&B; soul; pop; gospel
- Occupations: Singer; songwriter; musician
- Instruments: Vocals; piano
- Years active: 1961–2012
- Labels: Bobbin; Prann; Sonja; Checker; MCA
- Parent: Martha Bass (mother)
- Relatives: David Peaston (brother)

Fontella Marie Bass (/bæs/; July 3, 1940 – December 26, 2012) was an American R&B and soul singer-songwriter best known for her number-one R&B hit "Rescue Me" in 1965. She also collaborated with artists like the Art Ensemble of Chicago, The Cinematic Orchestra, and her husband, jazz trumpeter Lester Bowie. Bass received two Grammy nominations and was inducted into the St. Louis Walk of Fame.

== Early life ==
Fontella Bass was born in St. Louis, Missouri, United States. She was the daughter of gospel singer Martha Bass, who was a member of the Clara Ward Singers, and the older sister of R&B singer David Peaston. At an early age, Fontella showed great musical talent. At the age of five, she provided the piano accompaniment for her grandmother's singing at funeral services, she sang in her church's choir at six, and by the time she was nine, she had accompanied her mother on tours throughout the South and Southwest United States.

Bass continued touring with her mother until the age of sixteen. As a teenager, Bass was attracted by more secular music. She began singing R&B songs at local contests and fairs while attending Soldan High School from which she graduated in 1958. At 17, she started her professional career working at the Showboat Club near Chain of Rocks, Missouri. In 1961, she auditioned on a dare for the Leon Claxton carnival show and was hired to play piano and sing in the chorus for two weeks, making $175 per week for the two weeks it was in town. She wanted to go on tour with Claxton but her mother refused; according to Bass, "she literally dragged me off the train". It was during this brief stint with Claxton that Bass was heard by vocalist Little Milton and his bandleader Oliver Sain, who hired her to back Little Milton on piano for concerts and recording.

Bass originally only played piano with the band, but one night Milton failed to arrive on time, so Sain asked her to sing and she was soon given her own featured vocal spot in the show. Milton and Sain eventually split up and Bass went with Sain; he also recruited male singer Bobby McClure and the group became known as "The Oliver Sain Soul Revue featuring Fontella and Bobby McClure".

== Recording career ==
With the support of Bob Lyons, the manager of St. Louis station KATZ, Bass recorded several songs released through Bobbin Records. She was produced by Ike Turner when she recorded on his labels Prann and Sonja. Her single "Poor Little Fool", released from Sonja in 1964, features Tina Turner. Bass saw no particular success with these singles. It was also during this period she met and subsequently married the jazz trumpeter, Lester Bowie.

Two years later, she quit the Milton band and moved to Chicago after a dispute with Oliver Sain. She auditioned for Chess Records, who immediately signed her as a recording artist to the subsidiary label Checker Records. Her first works with the label were several duets with Bobby McClure, who had also been signed to the label. Released early in 1965, their recording "Don't Mess Up a Good Thing" (credited to Oliver Sain) found immediate success, reaching No. 5 on the Billboard R&B chart and peaking at No. 33 on the Hot 100. The song was later recorded by Ry Cooder and Chaka Khan on Cooder's album Bop 'Til You Drop (1979).

Bass and McClure followed their early success with "You're Gonna Miss Me" that summer, a song that had mild success, reaching the Top 30 on the R&B chart, although it made no significant impression on the pop chart. After a brief tour, Bass returned to the studio. The culmination of one particular session was an original composition with an aggressive rhythm section; backing musicians on the track included drummer Maurice White (later the leader of Earth, Wind, & Fire), bassist Louis Satterfield (fellow future Earth, Wind, & Fire member) and tenor saxophonist Gene Barge, with the young Minnie Riperton among the backing singers. The resulting song, "Rescue Me" shot up the charts in late 1965. After a month-long run at the top of the R&B chart, the song reached No. 4 on the US pop chart and No. 11 in the UK singles chart, and gave Chess its first million-selling single since Chuck Berry a decade earlier. It sold more than one million copies, and was awarded a gold disc.

Bass followed with "Recovery", which did moderately well, peaking at number 13 (R&B) and number 37 (pop) in early 1966. The same year brought two more R&B hits: "I Can't Rest" (backed with "I Surrender)" and "You'll Never Know". Her only album with Chess Records, The New Look, sold reasonably well, but Bass soon became disillusioned with Chess and decided to leave the label after only two years, in 1967. Bass claimed that although the credited co-writers, Carl Smith and Raynard Miner, and record producer Billy Davis had assured her that her contribution to co-writing the lyrics of "Rescue Me" would be acknowledged, this was never done.

I had the first million seller for Chess since Chuck Berry about 10 years before. Things were riding high for them, but when it came time to collect my first royalty check, I looked at it, saw how little it was, tore it up and threw it back across the desk.

Bass demanded a better royalty rate and artistic control; she approached her then manager Billy Davis about securing her writing credit on the song but was told not to worry about it. When the record came out and her name was still not on it, she was told it would be on the legal documents, but this never happened. She continued to agitate about the matter for a couple of years but later recalled: "It actually side-stepped me in the business because I got a reputation of being a trouble maker".

Tiring of the mainstream music scene, she and husband Lester Bowie left America and moved to Paris in 1969, where she recorded two albums with the Art Ensemble of Chicago – Art Ensemble of Chicago with Fontella Bass and Les Stances a Sophie (both 1970). The latter was the soundtrack from the French movie of the same title, documented by the Library of Congress Jazz on the Screen database, which credits her as vocalist alongside Lester Bowie (trumpet), Joseph Jarman and Roscoe Mitchell (reeds), Malachi Favors (bass), and Don Moye (drums). She also appeared on Bowie's The Great Pretender (1981) and All the Magic (1982).

Even with the success of "Rescue Me", it was many years and much litigation before Bass would be credited with her share of the songwriting and the royalties. In 1993, Bass sued American Express for unauthorized use of the song in a commercial, and was awarded a significant settlement.

== Later career and death ==
The next few years found Bass at several labels, but saw no notable successes. After her second album, Free, flopped in 1972, Bass retired from music and concentrated on raising a family; she had four children with avant-garde trumpeter Lester Bowie. She returned occasionally, being featured as a background vocalist on several recordings, including those by Bowie. In 1990, she recorded a gospel album with her mother and brother David Peaston, called Promises: A Family Portrait of Faith and undertook a fall tour of the US West Coast, called "Juke Joints and Jubilee", which featured both traditional gospel and blues performers. During the 1990s, she hosted a short-lived Chicago radio talk show, and released several gospel records on independent labels. In 1992, through her old friend Hamiet Bluiett, she was invited to perform three tracks on the World Saxophone Quartet album Breath of Life.

The original version of "Rescue Me" was used in a TV advertising campaign by American Express. Fontella Bass has stated that she was at a low point in her life when on New Year's Day 1990 she was astonished to hear her own voice singing "Rescue Me" on the American Express television ad. The experience gave Bass the inspiration to set her life in order: it also motivated her to make queries over the unauthorised commercial use of her recording of "Rescue Me", with the ultimate result a 1993 settlement with American Express and its advertising agency, Ogilvy & Mather, awarding Bass $50,000 plus punitive damages.

Like many artists of her time, Bass experienced a revival of interest. She sang on the NBC TV show Night Music in 1989 episode number 116. She was featured on the PBS Special and accompanying DVD, Soul Celebration. Soul Spectacular recorded live at Heinz Hall in Pittsburgh, Pennsylvania, November 2001. Her voice can be heard on two tracks on the Cinematic Orchestra's 2002 album Every Day, and another two tracks on their 2007 album Ma Fleur.

In May 2000, Bass received a star on the St. Louis Walk of Fame. In 2001, Bass released the gospel-jazz album Travellin' (Justin Time Records). The album was co-produced by her son [(Bahnamous Lee Bowie)], who also performed keyboards throughout the recording; the St. Louis Post-Dispatch noted his contributions alongside the ensemble, describing the project as a family affair rooted in gospel and blues.

In the 2000s, she toured Europe with her younger brother David Peaston, until she fell ill. For her last years, she had to struggle due to her deteriorating health. Bass survived breast cancer, a series of strokes beginning in 2005, and a leg amputation. On December 26, 2012, she died at a St. Louis hospital from complications of a heart attack suffered earlier in the month; she was 72. She was survived by four children.

== Grammy Awards ==
The Grammy Awards are awarded annually by the National Academy of Recording Arts and Sciences. Bass has received two Grammy nominations.

Year	Category	Nominated work	Result
1965	Best Contemporary Vocal Performance Female	"Rescue Me"	Nominated
1995	Best Traditional Soul Gospel Performance	No Ways Tired	Nominated

== Discography ==
=== Albums ===
Year	Album	Peak chart positions
Year	Album	US 200
1966	The New Look	93
1970	Les Stances a Sophie with the Art Ensemble of Chicago	—
1970	Live in Paris with the Art Ensemble of Chicago	—
1970	Art Ensemble of Chicago with Fontella Bass	—
1972	Free	—
1980	From the Root to the Source	—
1992	Rescued: The Best of Fontella Bass	—
1995	No Ways Tired	—
1996	Now That I Found a Good Thing	—
2001	Travelin	—

=== Singles ===
Year	Single	Peak chart positions			Label	Album
Year	Single	US R&B	US Pop	UK	Label	Album
1962	"I Don't Hurt Anymore" / "Brand New Love"	—	—	—	Bobbin	Non-album tracks
1962	"Honey Bee" / "Bad Boy"	—	—	—	Bobbin	Non-album tracks
1963	"I Love The Man" / "My Good Loving"	—	—	—	Prann	Non-album tracks
1964	"Poor Little Fool" / "This Would Make Me Happy"	—	—	—	Sonja	Non-album tracks
1965	"Don't Mess Up a Good Thing" with Bobby McClure	5	33	—	Checker	Non-album tracks
1965	"You'll Miss Me (When I'm Gone)" with Bobby McClure	27	91	—	Checker	Non-album tracks
1965	"Rescue Me" / "Soul of the Man"	1	4	11	Checker	The New Look
1966	"Recovery" / "Leave It in the Hands of Love"	13	37	32	Checker	Rescued: The Best of Fontella Bass
1966	"I Can't Rest" / "I Surrender"	31; 33	— 78	— —	Checker	Rescued: The Best of Fontella Bass
1966	"You'll Never Ever Know" / "Safe and Sound"	34 —	— 100	— —	Checker	Rescued: The Best of Fontella Bass
1967	"Lucky In Love" / "Sweet Lovin' Daddy"	—	—	—	Checker	The Very Best of Fontella Bass
"—" denotes releases that did not chart.

== See also ==
- Willie Dixon
