= Royal American Shows =

Carnival company in America and Canada

- Royal American Shows trailer
- Company type: Privately held company
- Industry: Entertainment
- Founded: 1923
- Founder: Carl J. Sedlmayr (1886-1965)
- Defunct: 1997
- Headquarters: Tampa, Florida, U.S.
- Products: Amusement ride rental/operation and traveling carnival management

Royal American Shows (RAS) was a leading American traveling carnival company that operated from the 1920s to the 1990s in the United States and in Canada until the 1970s. The company promoted itself as the "Most Beautiful Show on Earth", with the "World's Largest Midway."

== Background ==
The company was established by Carl John Sedlmayr (October 20, 1886 – November 4, 1965). Sedlmayr was born in Falls City, Nebraska, of German ancestry, and after his father died in 1897 was sent to live with relatives in Kansas City, Missouri. He started work as a travelling salesman for fountain pens, but became interested in the fairground lifestyle. In 1907 he took a job as a ticket seller in Chicago, and later started opening his own sideshow attractions. After gaining experience as a showman, he and a partner bought the Siegrist & Silbon Shows in 1921.

== History ==
Sedlmayr took sole ownership and changed the company name to Royal American Shows in 1923. In 1924 he began running the company in partnership with two brothers, Curtis J. Velare (1880–1970) and Elmer C. Velare (1884–1947), who specialized in operating and running mechanical fairground rides. The business expanded rapidly through the 1920s and 1930s as Sedlmayr signed lucrative contracts with state fairs and festivals throughout the Midwest, Southern United States, and western Canada. The company claimed that its carnival was "dedicated to the principle of carrying clean, high-class entertainment to the public".

The company won its first contract with the Calgary Stampede in 1934, and Sedlmayr became "the undisputed king of the carnival circuit". In 1938, when employees at the Barnum & Bailey Circus went on strike, RAS were able to expand further into spaces left vacant by the circus, but during World War II, restrictions on rail use meant that the company was unable to travel to Canada.

From about 1931, the company employed Tom Parker, later the manager of Elvis Presley. Through his work as a "carny" with RAS, selling candy apples, Parker met his future wife, Marie Mott, and acquired an awareness of the cultural and political dynamics of the South and Midwest. He left Royal American Shows in 1938.

The partnership between Sedlmayr and the Velare brothers continued until the early 1940s. Sedlmayr then owned and operated the Rubin & Cherry shows for two years in partnership with Sam Soloman, before relaunching Royal American Shows as the company's sole owner in the mid-1940s. The company regained the Western Canadian "A" circuit of fairs in 1946, and its shows starred Lash LaRue, exotic dancers Gypsy Rose Lee and Sally Rand, and Leon Claxton's all-black musical revue Harlem in Havana. The fairground rides embraced new technology that had been developed in World War II, and included four Ferris wheels placed side by side.

The company continued to expand and develop through the 1950s. According to circus historian Fred Dahlinger Jr.: "Always innovative in presentation, technology and operation, few carnivals approached the Royal behemoth in quantity, diversity and splendor." By 1967, the company was regularly moving over 800 people, together with livestock and equipment, and "carried the greatest number of flatcars ever carried by any traveling amusement organization in the world."

After Carl J. Sedlmayr Sr. died in 1965, the business was run by his son Carl J. Sedlmayr Jr. (1919–2001) and grandson Carl J. Sedlmayr III (1945–1991). The increasing cost of rail transport affected the finances of the company. In 1975, while in Regina, Saskatchewan at Buffalo Days, after undercover surveillance of the operation, Revenue Canada in conjunction with the RCMP raided the midway operation, seizing records and equipment. The company was accused of tax evasion and fraud by the Canadian authorities, and Sedlmayr Jr. was placed under arrest. He was freed after paying an outstanding tax bill. The inquiry into RAS affairs led to the foundation of the Alberta Gaming Commission. Sedlmayr Jr. vowed never to return to Canada, and many of the company's properties remained in storage there until the 1990s. The company continued to operate in the United States, but steadily diminished in size. The last RAS show was staged in Lubbock, Texas, in 1997. The Shows' equipment and materials were sold by auction at its winter base in Tampa, Florida, in 1999.
