= Mitty Collier =

American singer (born 1941)

- Born: Mitty Lene Collier; June 21, 1941 (age 84); Birmingham, Alabama, U.S.
- Genres: Soul, R&B, gospel
- Occupation: Singer
- Instrument: Vocals
- Years active: 1959–1987
- Labels: Chess; Peachtree

Mitty Lene Collier (born June 21, 1941) is an American church pastor, gospel singer and former rhythm and blues singer. She had a number of successful records in the 1960s, of which probably the best known is "I Had A Talk With My Man".

== Early life and career ==
Mitty Collier was born in Birmingham, Alabama, United States, the seventh child of Rufus and Gertrude Collier, and attended Western-Olin High School, Alabama A & M College and Miles College where she majored in English. She began singing in church as a teenager, and toured with gospel groups, the Hayes Ensemble and the Lloyd Reese Singers, before starting to sing rhythm and blues in local clubs to help subsidise her college education. In 1959, while visiting Chicago, she entered DJ Al Benson's talent show at the Regal Theater, winning for six straight weeks and gaining her a slot on a bill with B. B. King and Etta James as a prize. This brought her to the attention of Ralph Bass of Chess Records, who offered her a recording contract.

She recorded for the Chess label from 1961 to 1968, releasing 15 singles and one album, mostly produced by Billy Davis. Her first record was "Gotta Get Away From It All", which was not a hit. Her first real success came in 1963 with "I'm Your Part Time Love", an answer record to Little Johnny Taylor's "Part Time Love". It reached No. 20 on the Billboard R&B chart, and was followed up with "I Had A Talk With My Man", a secularised version of James Cleveland's gospel song "I Had A Talk With God Last Night". The orchestrated ballad reached No. 41 on the Billboard Hot 100 and No. 3 on the Cash Box R&B chart, and became her best known song, later being covered by Dusty Springfield, Jackie Ross, and Shirley Brown among others. Her next record, "No Faith, No Love", was also a reworking of a James Cleveland song "No Cross, No Crown", and reached No. 29 on the Billboard R&B chart and No. 91 on the pop chart. She released an album, Shades Of A Genius, in 1965. Her last hit, in 1966, was "Sharing You" (No. 10 on the R&B chart, No. 97 pop). She left Chess in 1968 after recording a single, a new version of "Gotta Get Away From It All" recorded at FAME Studios in Muscle Shoals, with the record producer Rick Hall. She then recorded five further singles and an album with William Bell's Peachtree Records label in Atlanta, Georgia. However, in 1971 she developed polyps on her vocal cords, losing her singing voice, and gave up her secular music career.

== Later career ==
She then began to devote her life to her Christian beliefs. After recovering her voice she recorded several albums of gospel music, of which the first, The Warning in 1972, featured "I Had A Talk With God Last Night". Later albums included Hold The Light (1977) and I Am Love (1987). She also established a Bible Study Telephone Prayer Line and a community outreach program, "Feed-A-Neighbor" (FAN), for which she received the key to the city of Birmingham in 1987. She became a preacher, and was ordained in 1989, later being appointed pastor of the More Like Christ (MLC) Christian Fellowship Ministries in Chicago. She has also worked at the University of Chicago, as well as writing plays and continuing to sing gospel music. She has received a number of other humanitarian and other awards, including the National Council of Negro Women (NCNW) Woman of Wonder Award 2000.

== Discography ==
=== Singles (chart hits only) ===
Year	Title	Label & Cat. No.	U.S. Pop	U.S. R&B	Canada
1963	"I'm Your Part Time Love"	Chess 1871	-	20	-
1964	"I Had A Talk With My Man"	Chess 1907	41	3	26
1965	"No Faith, No Love"	Chess 1918	91	29	-
1966	"Sharing You"	Chess 1953	97	10	-

=== Albums ===
- Shades of a Genius (Chess, 1965)
- The Warning (2 A.M., 1972)
- Hold The Light (Gospel Roots, 1977)
- I Am Love (New Sound, 1987)
