= The New Look (album) =

- UK Cover

Studio album by Fontella Bass
- Released: 1966
- Recorded: November 1965
- Studio: Ter Mar Recording Studios, Chicago
- Genre: Soul
- Length: 35:25
- Label: Checker Records
- Producer: Billy Davis

Fontella Bass chronology
The New Look (1966)	Les Stances a Sophie (1970)

Professional ratings
Review scores
Source	Rating
AllMusic	3.5/5 stars
Record Mirror	4/5 stars

The New Look is the debut studio album by Fontella Bass released on Checker Records 2997. It contains her biggest hit, "Rescue Me". The album also charted on the pop albums chart, being listed for 8 weeks, with a highest position of No. 93.

== Track listing ==
Side one

1. "Our Day Will Come" (M. Garson & Bob Hilliard) 3:45
2. "How Glad I Am" (Jimmy Williams & Larry Harrison) 2:41
3. "Oh No Not My Baby" (Gerry Goffin & Carole King) 2:39
4. "Rescue Me" (Carl Smith & Reynard Miner) 2:50
5. "Gee Whiz" (Carla Thomas) 2:28
6. "I'm a Woman" (Jerry Leiber & Mike Stoller) 2:29

Side two

1. "Since I Fell for You" (Buddy Johnson) 3:24
2. "Impossible" (O. Jones & B. F. Flip) 2:49
3. "You've Lost That Lovin' Feelin''" (Phil Spector, Barry Mann & Cynthia Weil 3:24
4. "Soul of the Man" (Oliver Sain) 3:30
5. "Come and Get These Memories" (Brian Holland & Lamont Dozier) 2:18
6. "I Know" (Barbara George) 3:08

== Charts ==
Chart (1966)	Peak position
US Billboard Top LP's	93
US Billboard Hot R&B LP's	6
