= The Very Best of Little Milton =

Compilation album by Little Milton
- Released: July 17, 2007
- Recorded: 1971–1975
- Genre: R&B, Southern soul, funk
- Length: 1:09:07
- Label: Stax; STXCD-30306
- Producer: Rob Bowman

Professional ratings
Review scores
Source	Rating
Allmusic	3.5/5 stars

The Very Best of Little Milton is a compilation album by American musician Little Milton released on Concord Records. The album is part of Stax's Very Best Series.

Allmusic review by Al Campbell says: "This set is aimed at the casual listener and includes such R&B charted singles as "If That Ain't a Reason (For Your Woman to Leave You)," "What It Is," "Tin Pan Alley" and Milton's rendition of the Charlie Rich hit of the previous year "Behind Closed Doors." "

== Track listing ==
1. If That Ain't A Reason (For Your Woman To Leave You) - 3:22
2. I'm Living Off The Love You Give - 2:48
3. That's What Love Will Make You Do - 3:53
4. Before The Honeymoon - 3:27
5. Walking The Back Streets And Crying - 5:00
6. Eight Men And Four Women - 5:02
7. I'm Gonna Cry A River - 3:41
8. Let Me Down Easy [Recorded Live At Montreaux) - 6:35
9. Rainy Day - 3:24
10. Little Bluebird - 6:34
11. What It Is - 3:22
12. Tin Pan Alley - 3:33
13. Behind Closed Doors -4:01
14. Woman Across The River - 4:14
15. Let Me Back In - 3:00
16. If You Talk In Your Sleep - 2:45
17. Packed Up And Took My Mind - 3:58
