= Little Milton =

American blues singer and guitarist (1934–2005)

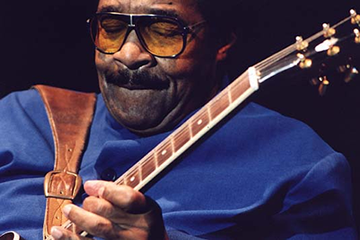
- Little Milton playing in Jackson, Mississippi, in 2002.

Background information
- Born: James Milton Campbell Jr. September 7, 1934; Inverness, Mississippi, U.S.
- Died: August 4, 2005 (aged 70); Memphis, Tennessee, U.S.
- Genres: Electric blues, R&B, soul, funk
- Occupation: Musician
- Instruments: Guitar, vocals
- Years active: 1953–2005
- Labels: Sun; Meteor; Bobbin; Checker; Stax; Glades; Golden Ear; MCA; Malaco
- Website: Official website

James Milton Campbell Jr. (September 7, 1934 – August 4, 2005), better known as Little Milton, was an American blues singer and guitarist, best known for his number-one R&B single "We're Gonna Make It". His other hits include "Baby, I Love You", "Who's Cheating Who?", and "Grits Ain't Groceries (All Around The World)".

A native of the Mississippi Delta, Milton began his recording career in 1953 at Sun Records before relocating to St. Louis and co-founding Bobbin Records in 1958. It was not until Milton signed to Checker Records that he achieved success on the charts. Other labels Milton recorded for included Meteor, Stax, Glades, Golden Ear, MCA, and Malaco. Milton was inducted into the Blues Hall of Fame in 1988.

== Biography ==
Milton was born James Milton Campbell Jr. on September 7, 1934, in Inverness, Mississippi. He was raised in Greenville, Mississippi, by a farmer and local blues musician. By age twelve he was a street musician, chiefly influenced by T-Bone Walker and his blues and rock and roll contemporaries. He joined the Rhythm Aces in the early part of the 1950s, a three piece band who played throughout the Mississippi Delta area. One of the members was Eddie Cusic who taught Milton to play the guitar. In 1951, Milton recorded several sides backing pianist Willie Love for Trumpet Records.

In 1953, while still a teenager playing in local bars, he was discovered by Ike Turner, who was a talent scout for Sam Phillips at Sun Records. Milton signed a contract with the label and recorded a number of singles. None of them broke through onto radio or sold well at record stores, so Milton left the Sun label in 1955. The next two years he released singles on Modern Records' subsidiary, Meteor Records.

In 1958, Milton moved to East St. Louis and set up the St. Louis-based Bobbin Records label, which ultimately scored a distribution deal with Leonard Chess' Chess Records. As a record producer, Milton helped bring artists such as Albert King and Fontella Bass to fame, while experiencing his own success for the first time. After a number of small format and regional hits, his 1962 single, "So Mean to Me," broke onto the Billboard R&B chart, eventually peaking at number 14.

Following a short break to tour, managing other acts, and spending time recording new material, he returned to music in 1965 with a more polished sound, similar to that of B.B. King. After the ill-received "Blind Man" (R&B: number 86), he released back-to-back hit singles. The first, "We're Gonna Make It," a blues-infused soul song, topped the R&B chart and broke through onto Top 40 radio, a format then dominated largely by white artists. He followed the song with number 4 R&B hit "Who's Cheating Who?" All three songs were featured on his album, We're Gonna Make It, released that summer.

"Any category they want to put me in is fine with me as long as they accept what I do."

— Little Milton

Milton's song "Let Me Down Easy" was recorded by the Spencer Davis Group on The Second Album (1965), but his authorship was not acknowledged on the record. He released a single of it himself in 1968 on Checker. It was also chosen by Etta James as the final track in her final album The Dreamer in 2011.

Throughout the late 1960s Milton released a number of moderately successful singles, but did not issue a further album until 1969, with Grits Ain't Groceries featuring his hit of the same name, as well as "Just a Little Bit" and "Baby, I Love You". With the death of Leonard Chess the same year, Milton's distributor, Checker Records fell into disarray, and Milton joined the Stax label two years later. Adding complex orchestration to his works, Milton scored hits with "That's What Love Will Make You Do" and "What It Is" from his live album, What It Is: Live at Montreux. He appeared in the documentary film, Wattstax, which was released in 1973. Stax, however, had been losing money since late in the previous decade and was forced into bankruptcy in 1975.

After leaving Stax, Milton struggled to maintain a career, moving first to Evidence, then the MCA imprint Mobile Fidelity Records, before finding a home at the independent record label, Malaco Records, where he received his second Grammy nomination for Welcome To Little Milton in 1999. He remained with the label for much of the remainder of his career. His last hit single, "Age Ain't Nothin' But a Number," was released in 1983 from the album of the same name. In 1988, Milton was inducted into the Blues Hall of Fame and won a W.C. Handy Award. His final album, Think of Me, was released in May 2005 on the Telarc imprint, and included writing and guitar on three songs by Peter Shoulder of the UK-based blues-rock trio Winterville.

Milton died at the age of 70 on August 4, 2005, from complications following a stroke. He was posthumously honored with a marker on the Mississippi Blues Trail in Inverness.

== Discography ==
=== Albums ===
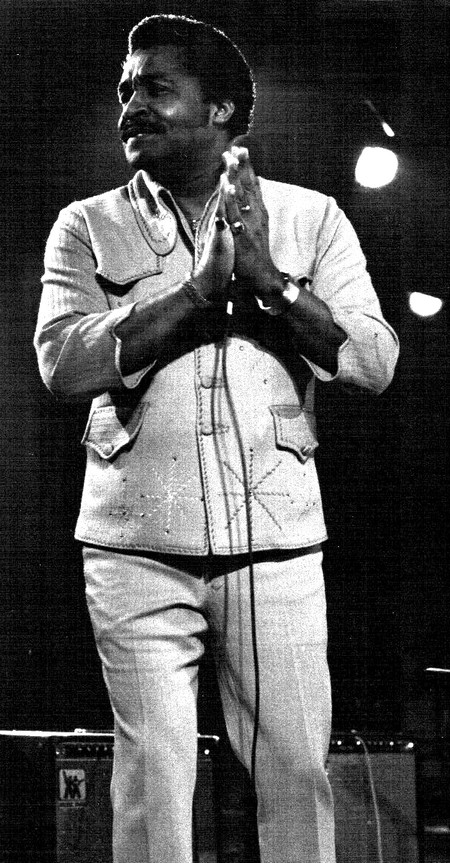
Little Milton in France, 1982.

Year	Album	Peak chart positions			Label
Year	Album	US	US R&B	US Blues	Label
1965	We're Gonna Make It	101	3	–	Checker
1966	Sings Big Blues	–	–	–	Checker
1969	Grits Ain't Groceries	159	41	–	Checker
1970	If Walls Could Talk	197	23	–	Checker
1973	Waiting for Little Milton	–	39	–	Stax
1974	Blues 'n' Soul	–	45	–	Stax
1976	Friend of Mine	–	50	–	Glades
1977	Me for You, You for Me	–	–	–	Glades
1980	I Need Your Love So Bad	–	–	–	Golden Ear
1981	Walkin' the Back Streets	–	–	–	Stax
1982	The Blues Is Alright	–	–	–	Evidence
1983	Age Ain't Nothin' But a Number	–	53	–	MCA
1984	Playing for Keeps	–	55	–	Malaco
1985	I Will Survive	–	–	–	Malaco
1986	Annie Mae's Cafe	–	–	–	Malaco
1987	Movin' to the Country	–	–	–	Malaco
1988	Back to Back	–	73	–	Malaco
1990	Too Much Pain	–	40	–	Malaco
1991	Reality	–	57	–	Malaco
1992	Strugglin' Lady	–	63	–	Malaco
1994	I'm a Gambler	–	–	–	Malaco
1996	Cheatin' Habit	–	–	14	Malaco
1997	Count the Days	–	–	–	Malaco
1998	For Real	–	–	13	Malaco
1999	Welcome to Little Milton	–	–	10	Malaco
2001	Feel It	–	–	–	Malaco
2002	Guitar Man	–	–	8	Malaco
2004	The Blues Is Alright: Live at Kalamazoo	–	–	–	Varèse Sarabande
2005	Think of Me	–	–	14	Telarc
2006	Live at the North Atlantic Blues Festival: His Last Concert	–	–	–	Camil
"–" denotes releases that did not chart.

=== Compilation albums ===
- Greatest Hits (1972, Chess)
- Chess Blues Masters Series (1976, Chess) 2-LP
- His Greatest Sides, Vol. 1 (1983, MCA/Chess)
- The Sun Masters (1990, Rounder)
- Welcome to the Club: The Essential Chess Recordings (1994, MCA/Chess) 2-CD
- The Complete Stax Singles (1994, Fantasy)
- Stand By Me: The Blues Collection [No. 48] (1995, Orbis)
- Little Milton's Greatest Hits (1995, Malaco)
- St. Louis Blues Revue: The Classic Bobbin Sessions [various artists] (1996, Ace)
- Rockin' the Blues (1996, MCA Special Products)
- Greatest Hits (The Chess 50th Anniversary Collection) (1997, MCA/Chess)
- Chess Blues Guitar (Two Decades of Killer Fretwork 1949 to 1969) [various artists] (1998 MCA/Chess) 2-CD
- Count the Days (1997, 601 Records)
- The Complete Checker Hit Singles (2001, Connoisseur Collection)
- Anthology 1953–1961 (2002, Varèse Sarabande)
- Running Wild Blues (2006, Charly)
- Stax Profiles: Little Milton (2006, Stax)
- The Very Best of Little Milton (2007, Stax)
- Chicago Blues and Soul via Memphis and St. Louis (His Early years 1953–1962) (2014, Jasmine)

note: this is just a partial list

=== Appearances on other albums ===
- Jackie Ross: Take the Weight Off Me (Grapevine) – Milton sings five duets with Ross
- Albert King, Chico Hamilton, Little Milton: Montreux Festival (Stax, 1974) – a shared-album with King and Hamilton
- Various artists: Vanthology: Tribute to Van Morrison (Evidence, 2004) – Milton covered Van Morrison's "Tupelo Honey"
- Jean Jacques Milteau: Memphis (Sunnyside) – Milton covered Sting's "If You Love Somebody Set Them Free"
- E.C. Scott: The Other Side of Me (Black Bud) – Milton sings two duets with Scott
- Gov't Mule:
  - The Deep End, Volume 1 (ATO, 2001) – Milton sings "Soulshine" with Warren Haynes
  - Mulennium – live album [3-CD, 4-LP] (Evil Teen, 2010) recorded December 31, 1999, at the Roxy Theatre, Atlanta, Georgia
  - Wintertime Blues: Benefit Concert - a various artists performance from the 'Warren Haynes Christmas Jam' - December 22, 1999
- Willie Dixon: The Chess Box [2-CD, 3-LP] (MCA/Chess, 1988) – Milton performed "I Can't Quit You Baby"
- Ike Turner: That Kat Sure Could Play! The Singles 1951-1957 (Secret Records 2010) – Milton performs on six songs

=== Singles ===
Year	Single (A-side / B-side)	Label and reference number	Peak chart positions	
Year	Single (A-side / B-side)	Label and reference number	US	US R&B
1953	"Beggin' My Baby" / "Somebody Told Me"	Sun 194	–	–
1954	"If You Love Me" / "Alone and Blue"	Sun 200	–	–
1955	"Lookin' for My Baby" / "Homesick for My Baby"	Sun 220	–	–
1956	"Love at First Sight" / "Let's Boogie, Baby"	Meteor 5040	–	–
1957	"Let My Baby Be" / "Oh, My Little Baby"	Meteor 5045	–	–
1958	"That Will Never Do" / "I'm a Lonely Man"	Bobbin 101	–	–
1959	"Long Distance Operator" / "I Found Me a New Love"	Bobbin 103	–	–
1959	"Strange Dreams" / "I'm Tryin'"	Bobbin 112	–	–
1959	"Hold Me Tight" / "Same Old Blues"	Bobbin 117	–	–
1960	"Dead Love" / "My Baby Pleases Me"	Bobbin 120	–	–
1960	"Let It Be Known" / "Hey, Girl!"	Bobbin 125	–	–
1961	"Cross My Heart" / "I'm in Love"	Bobbin 128	–	–
1961	"Saving My Love for You" / "Lonely No More"	Checker 977	–	–
1961	"So Mean to Me" / "I Need Somebody"	Checker 994	–	14
1962	"Satisfied" / "Someone to Love"	Checker 1012	–	–
1962	"I Wonder Why" / "Losing Hand"	Checker 1020	–	–
1963	"She Put a Spell on Me" / "Never Too Old"	Checker 1048	–	–
1963	"One of These Old Days" / "Meddlin'"	Checker 1063	–	–
1964	"Sacrifice" / "What Kind of Love Is This"	Checker 1078	–	–
1964	"Blind Man" / "Blues in the Night"	Checker 1096	86	–
1965	"We're Gonna Make It" / "Can't Hold Back the Tears"	Checker 1105	25	1
1965	"Who's Cheating Who?" / "Ain't No Big Deal on You"	Checker 1113	43	4
1965	"Without My Sweet Baby" / "Help Me Help You"	Checker 1118	–	–
1965	"Your People" / "My Baby's Something Else"	Checker 1128	106	–
1966	"We Got the Winning Hand" / "Sometimey"	Checker 1132	100	–
1966	"When Does Heartache End" / "I'm Mighty Grateful"	Checker 1139	–	–
1966	"Man Loves Two" / "Believe in Me'	Checker 1149	127	45
1966	"Feel So Bad" / "You Colored My Blues Bright"	Checker 1162	91	7
1967	"I'll Never Turn My Back on You" / "Don't Leave Her"	Checker 1172	–	31
1967	"Sweet Sixteen pt.1" / "Sweet Sixteen pt.2"	Checker 1181	–	–
1967	"More and More" / "The Cost of Living"	Checker 1189	–	45
1968	"I Know What I Want" / "You Mean Everything to Me"	Checker 1194	–	–
1968	"At the Dark End of the Street" / "I Who Have Nothing"	Checker 1203	–	–
1968	"Let Me Down Easy" / "Driftin' Drifter"	Checker 1208	–	27
1968	"Grits Ain't Groceries (All Around The World)" / "I Can't Quit You Baby"	Checker 1212	73	13
1969	"Just a Little Bit" / "Spring"	Checker 1217	97	13
1969	"Poor Man" / "So Blue (Without You)"	Checker 1221	103	–
1969	"Let's Get Together" / "I'll Always Love You"	Checker 1225	–	–
1969	"If Walls Could Talk" / "Loving You"	Checker 1226	71	10
1970	"Baby, I Love You" / "Don't Talk Back"	Checker 1227	82	6
1970	"Somebody's Changin' My Sweet Baby's Mind" / "I'm Tired"	Checker 1231	–	22
1970	"Many Rivers to Cross" / "A Mother's Love"	Checker 1236	–	–
1971	"I Play Dirty" / "Nothing Beats a Failure"	Checker 1239	–	37
1971	"If That Ain't a Reason (For Your Woman to Leave You)" / "Mr. Mailman (I Don't Want No Letter)"	Stax 0100	–	41
1971	"That's What Love Will Make You Do" / "I'm Living Off the Love You Give"	Stax 0111	59	9
1972	"Before the Honeymoon" / "Walking the Back Streets and Crying"	Stax 0124	–	–
1972	"I'm Gonna Cry a River" / "What It Is" (B-side charted)	Stax 0141	–	–
1972	"Rainy Day" / "Lovin' Stick"	Stax 0148	–	–
1973	"What It Is" / "Who Can Handle Me Is You"	Stax 0174	–	51
1973	"Tin Pan Alley" / "Sweet Woman of Mine"	Stax 0191	–	51
1974	"Behind Closed Doors" / "Bet You I Win"	Stax 0210	–	31
1974	"Let Me Back In" / "Let Your Loss Be Your Lesson"	Stax 0229	–	38
1975	"If You Talk in Your Sleep" / "Sweet Woman of Mine"	Stax 0238	–	34
1975	"Packed Up and Took By Mind" / "How Could You Do It to Me"	Stax 0252	–	–
1975	"Who's Cheating Who" / "Feel So Bad"	Chess Blue Chip Series 9044	–	–
1976	"Many Rivers to Cross" / "More and More"	Chess ACH 30002	–	–
1976	"Friend of Mine (Vocal)" / "Friend of Mine (Instrumental)"	Glades 1734	–	15
1976	"Baby It Ain't No Way" / "Bring It on Back"	Glades 1738	–	94
1977	"Just One Step" / "Just One Step (Instrumental)"	Glades 1741	–	59
1977	"Loving You (Is the Best Thing to Happen to Me)" / "4:59 A.M."	Glades 1743	–	47
1977	"Me for You, You for Me" / "My Thing Is You"	Glades 1747	–	–
1978	"Real Love" / "Survivors of Love"	Mier 2507	–	–
1980	"I Need Your Love So Bad" / "I Wake Up Crying"	Golden Ear 2281	–	–
1980	"You Ought to Be Here with Me" / "Don't Leave Her"	Golden Ear 2285	–	–
1980	"Catch the Plane" / "Believe in Me"	Golden Ear 2286	–	–
1980	"I Like Your Loving" / "No Matter Where You Go"	Golden Ear 2287	–	–
1980	"The Cost of Living" / "I Need You Baby" (B-side by Jackie Ross)	Golden Ear 2289	–	–
1980	"Walking the Backstreets and Crying / "If That Ain't a Reason (For Your Woman to Leave You)"	Stax 1051	–	–
1980	"If You Talk in Your Sleep" / "Let Me Back In"	Stax 1052	–	–
1980	"Little Bluebird" / "Blue Monday"	Stax 1057	–	–
1982	"Feel So Bad" / "I Had a Talk with My Man" (B-side by Mitty Collier)	Chess CH 129	–	–
1983	"Age Ain't Nothin' but a Number" / "Age Ain't Nothin' but a Number (Instrumental)"	MCA 52184	–	89
1983	"Living on the Dark Side of Love" / "Why Are You So Hard to Please"	MCA 52254	–	–
1984	"The Blues Is Alright" / "Comeback Kind of Loving"	Malaco 2104	–	–
1984	"Misty Blue" / "Catch You on Your Way Down"	Malaco 2108	–	–
1984	"Tin Pan Alley" / "Just Got to Know" (B-side by Jimmy McCracklin)	Stax 1062	–	–
1985	"Lonesome Christmas" / "Come to Me"	Malaco 2123	–	–
1986	"I Will Survive" / "4:59 AM"	Malaco 2127	–	–
1986	"A Real Good Woman" / "Annie Mae's Cafe"	Malaco 2134	–	–
1987	"Cheatin' Is a Risky Business" / "I'm at the End of My Rainbow"	Malaco 2137	–	–
1987	"Room 244" / "You're So Cold"	Malaco 2143	–	–
1988	"His Old Lady and My Old Lady" / "A Possum in My Tree"	Malaco 2147	–	–
1988	"I Don't Believe in Ghosts" / "I Was Tryin' Not to Break Down"	Malaco 2151	–	–
1989	"Wind Beneath My Wings" / "Too Much Heaven"	Malaco 2155	–	–
1989	"Landslide" (A-side by Tony Clarke) / "We're Gonna Make It"	Ripete 45-273	–	–
1990	"Bad Dream" / "The Woman I Love"	Malaco 2162	–	–
1990	"The Cradle Is Robbin' Me" / "Still in Love with You"	Malaco 2165	–	–
1991	"You Left a Goldmine for a Golddigger" / "I've Got to Remember"	Malaco 2174	–	–
1991	"Secretary" (A-side by Betty Wright) / "Stand by Me"	Red Dog Express 45-3501	–	–
1991	"Gonna Get Along Without You Now" (A-side by Viola Wills) / "Just One Step"	Red Dog Express 45-3504	–	–
1992	"Strugglin' Lady" / "She Never Gets the Blues"	Malaco 2187	–	–
1993	"My Dog and Me" / "Cafe Woman"	Malac0 2189	–	–
1994	"Casino Blues" / "That's All Right"	Malaco 2198	–	–
1994	"Like a Rooster on a Hen" / "Poke Salad Annie"	Malaco 2200	–	–
1996	"Kick My Cheatin' Habits" / "How Does a Cheatin' Woman Feel"	Malaco 2309	–	–
1998	"Big Boned Woman" / "I'd Rather Be with You"	Malaco 2340	–	–
1999	"Lump on Your Stump" / "Right to Sing the Blues"	Malaco 2342	–	–
"–" denotes releases that did not chart or were not released in that territory.
