= The 5th Power =

Live album by Lester Bowie
- Released: 1978
- Recorded: April 12–17, 1978
- Genre: Jazz
- Length: 44:44
- Label: Black Saint
- Producer: Giacomo Pellicciotti

Lester Bowie chronology
Duet (1978)	The 5th Power (1978)	The Great Pretender (1981)

The 5th Power is a live album by Lester Bowie, recorded for the Italian Black Saint label and released in 1978. It was recorded during a concert tour of Europe by Bowie's group From the Roots to the Source and features performances by Bowie, Arthur Blythe, Amina Claudine Myers, Malachi Favors and Phillip Wilson.

== Reception ==
The AllMusic review by Michael G. Nastos stated, "Creative jazz and a progressive gospel segment. Bowie at his eclectic best. Essential".

Professional ratings
Review scores
Source	Rating
AllMusic	4/5 stars
The Penguin Guide to Jazz Recordings	3/4 stars
The Rolling Stone Jazz Record Guide	5/5 stars

== Track listing ==
All tracks are written by Lester Bowie except as indicated.

No.	Title	Writer(s)	Length
1.	"Sardegna Amore (New Is Full of Lonely People)"		6:20
2.	"3 in 1 (Three in One)"		9:32
3.	"BBB [Duet]"	Arthur Blythe, Amina Claudine Myers	5:52
4.	"God Has Smiled on Me"	Traditional; arranged by Bowie, Myers	18:02
5.	"The 5th Power (Finale)"		4:58

== Personnel ==
- Lester Bowie - trumpet
- Arthur Blythe - alto saxophone
- Amina Claudine Myers - piano, vocals
- Malachi Favors - bass
- Phillip Wilson - drums
