= Got to Get You Off My Mind =

Single by Solomon Burke

from the album The Best of Solomon Burke
- B-side: "Peepin'"
- Released: 1965
- Recorded: 1965
- Genre: Soul
- Length: 2:39
- Label: Atlantic; 2276
- Songwriters: Solomon Burke, Delores Burke, J.B. Moore
- Producers: Jerry Wexler, Bert Berns

Solomon Burke singles chronology
"The Price" (1964)	"Got to Get You Off My Mind" (1965)	"Tonight's the Night" (1965)

Official audio
- "Got to Get You Off My Mind" on YouTube

"Got to Get You Off My Mind" is a 1965 soul single written and performed by Solomon Burke. The single was produced by Jerry Wexler, and was the most successful of Burke's long career, becoming his highest-charting single on both the R&B and pop singles charts. "Got to Get You Off My Mind" was number one on Billboard's R&B Singles chart for three weeks and made the Top 40 on the pop singles chart.

== Background ==
Burke recorded the song, one of four, during a recording session on January 22, 1965. The song was written by Burke, his second wife Delores (by then mother of 11 of his children) and his mother Josephine Burke Moore. It was started on 11 December 1964, just hours after Burke heard that his friend Sam Cooke had been murdered. Burke explained the origin of "Got to Get You Off My Mind": “It was written in California the night of Sam Cooke’s death. I learned of Sam Cooke’s death after leaving him two hours prior to that. At the same time I learned about my wife wanting a divorce. A special delivery letter was at the desk waiting for me in the hotel... so all of these things came about very quickly and very drastically.” Burke completed the song on the train back to Chicago for Cooke's funeral.

== Chart positions ==
Chart (1965)	Peak position
U.S. Billboard Hot 100	22
U.S. Billboard Hot R&B Singles	1

== Personnel ==
- Producer: Jerry Wexler, Bert Berns
- Lead vocals: Solomon Burke
- Vocal group: The Sweet Inspirations
- Background vocals: Estelle Brown, Sylvia Shemwell, Cissy Houston, Dee Dee Warwick
- Bass: David Adams
- Drums: Panama Francis
- Guitar: Bob Bushnell, Bill Suyker, Eric Gale
- Piano: Ernie Hayes
- Trumpet: Bill Berry, Ernie Royal
- Bass trombone: Tony Studd
- Tenor saxophone: Charlie Brown, Sam Taylor
- Baritone saxophone: Seldon Powell
- Arrangements: Gene Page
- Conductor: Gene Page

== See also ==
- List of number-one R&B singles of 1965 (U.S.)
