= Rescue Me (Fontella Bass song) =

Single by Fontella Bass

from the album The New Look
- B-side: "Soul of the Man"
- Released: September 25, 1965
- Recorded: August 1965
- Studio: Chess (Chicago)
- Genre: Chicago soul
- Length: 2:51
- Label: Chess
- Songwriters: Raynard Miner; Carl Smith; Fontella Bass (disputed)
- Producer: Billy Davis

Fontella Bass singles chronology
""You'll Miss Me (When I'm Gone)" (with Bobby McClure)" (1965)	"Rescue Me" (1965)	"Recovery" (1965)

Official audio
- "Rescue Me" on YouTube

"Rescue Me" is a rhythm and blues song first recorded and released as a single by American soul singer-songwriter Fontella Bass in 1965. The original versions of the record, and BMI, give the songwriting credit to Raynard Miner and Carl William Smith, although many other sources also credit Bass herself as a co-writer. It would prove the biggest hit of Bass's career, reaching #1 on the R&B charts for four weeks and placing at #4 on the Billboard Hot 100. "Rescue Me" also peaked at #11 on the UK Singles Chart.

== Original recording ==
According to writer Robert Pruter in his book Chicago Soul, the song emerged from a songwriting and rehearsal, or "woodshedding", session at Chess Records: " 'Rescue Me' was a terrific example of the Chess studio system at its finest... One Saturday in August 1965, Bass was sitting in a rehearsal studio with producers-writers Carl Smith and Raynard Miner. They were fooling around with the song when arranger Phil Wright walked in, and the ensuing four-way jam session brought forth 'Rescue Me'. [Billy] Davis produced the side..." Bass claimed that, although Smith, Miner and Davis had assured her that her contribution to authorship of the song's lyrics would be acknowledged, this was never done.

Bass recorded the song in three takes at Chess Studios in Chicago. Minnie Riperton provided background vocals, and Maurice White and Louis Satterfield, later of Earth, Wind & Fire, were on drums and bass respectively. Other musicians on the record included Gene Barge on tenor sax, Pete Cosey and Gerald Sims on guitar, Raynard Miner on piano, Sonny Thompson on organ, and Charles Stepney on vibes. According to Bass, the call-and-response moans heard in the song's fade were unintentional. In an interview with The New York Times in 1989, she said, “When we were recording that, I forgot some of the words... Back then, you didn't stop while the tape was running, and I remembered from the church what to do if you forget the words. I sang, ‘Ummm, ummm, ummm,’ and it worked out just fine.”

== Chart history ==
=== Weekly charts ===
Fontella Bass

Chart (1965)	Peak position
UK Singles (OCC)	11
U.S. Billboard Hot 100	4
U.S. Billboard R&B	1
U.S. Cash Box Top 100	3

Shirley Eikhard

Chart (1974)	Peak position
Canada RPM Adult Contemporary	70
Canada RPM Top Singles	87

Cher

Chart (1975)	Peak position
Canada RPM Top Singles	82
U.S. Cash Box Top 100	84
U.S. Record World	87

Melissa Manchester

Chart (1976)	Peak position
U.S. Billboard Hot 100	76

Gail Dahms

Chart (1976)	Peak position
Canada RPM Adult Contemporary	49

Sass Jordan

Chart (1990)	Peak position
Canada RPM Top Singles	44

Nu Generation

Chart (1999–2000)	Peak position
Belgium	40
France	77
Germany	78
Ireland (IRMA)	29
Netherlands	95
UK Singles (OCC)	8

=== Year-end charts ===
Chart (1965)	Rank
U.S. (Joel Whitburn's Pop Annual)	49

== Accolades ==
Publication	Country	Accolade	Year	Rank
Bruce Pollock	U.S.	The 7,500 Most Important Songs of 1944-2000	2005	*
Dave Marsh & Kevin Stein	U.S.	Original All-Time Greatest Top 40 Hits - 1965	1981	31
Dave Marsh	U.S.	The 1001 Greatest Singles Ever Made	1989	305

(*) designates lists that are unordered.

== Grammy Awards ==
The song was nominated for a Best Contemporary Vocal Performance Female Grammy in 1965.

In 2015, the 1965 recording by Fontella Bass on the Checker Records label was inducted into the Grammy Hall of Fame.

== Other versions ==
- Ann Peebles covered the song in here 1969 album, This is Ann Peebles.
- Shirley Eikhard put the song onto the Canadian Pop and AC charts in 1974.
- In 1974, Cher released it as a single, that was recorded for the album Dark Lady. Allmusic reviewed her version by calling it a good cover choice and noted that it is always good to hear her voice in classics. She reached #82 in Canada.
- In 1976, Melissa Manchester remade "Rescue Me" for her Better Days and Happy Endings album; released as a single the track reached #78 on the Billboard Hot 100, the only Hot 100 showing for the song since the original version.
- Diana Ross covered the song on her 1984 album Swept Away.
- Sass Jordan recorded it for the soundtrack of the 1989 film American Boyfriends; her version reached #44 on the Canadian singles chart.
- Pat Benatar added her rendition in 1994 for the soundtrack to the film Speed.
- The song was covered by Nu Generation in 1999 and peaked at #8 on the UK charts and #29 in Ireland.
- In 2019, David Solomon released a dance/electronic version of the song featuring Glee star Alex Newell.

== Clear Channel memorandum ==
"Rescue Me" was one of the songs deemed inappropriate by Clear Channel following the September 11, 2001 attacks.

== In other media ==
- The original version of "Rescue Me" was used in a TV advertising campaign by American Express: Fontella Bass has stated that she was at a low point in her life when on New Year's Day 1990 she was astonished to hear her own voice singing "Rescue Me" on the American Express television ad. The experience gave Bass the inspiration to set her life in order: it also motivated her to make queries over the commercial use of her recording of "Rescue Me" with the ultimate result a 1993 settlement with American Express and its advertising agency awarding Bass $50,000 plus punitive damages.
- In the late 1980s, a music video was created for "Rescue Me" that used footage from the 1945 Tex Avery cartoon Jerky Turkey and aired on VH1.
- It has also been used in the films In the Army Now, A Cinderella Story, Air America, Best, I, Robot, Jumpin' Jack Flash and Sister Act. The concluding commercials for the theatrical promotion campaign for the 1994 action film, Speed, used excerpts of the song. The Pat Benatar version was also used in the trailer for Muppets From Space.

== See also ==
- List of number-one R&B singles of 1965 (U.S.)
