= Bobby McClure =

American singer

- Born: April 21, 1942; Chicago, Illinois
- Died: November 13, 1992 (aged 50) Los Angeles, California
- Genres: Soul
- Occupation: Singer
- Years active: 1950s–1992
- Formerly of: The Soul Stirrers

Bobby McClure (April 21, 1942 – November 13, 1992) was an American soul singer.

== Biography ==
McClure was born in Chicago, Illinois. By the age of two his family had moved to St. Louis, where he sang in church and gospel groups in his youth. He sang with The Soul Stirrers (then led by Sam Cooke) in the 1950s, and moved into secular music soon after, singing with Bobby & the Vocals, Big Daddy Jenkins, and Oliver Sain. McClure, who recorded for Checker, a subsidiary of Chess Records, scored two hit singles in the U.S. in 1965, and thereafter helped launch the careers of Little Milton and Fontella Bass; during this time he also played with Otis Clay and Shirley Brown. "Peak of Love" was a soul hit in late 1966, however it barely scraped the pop charts.

McClure moved on from music in the 1970s, working in an Illinois jail as a corrections officer, though he recorded some singles in the 1980s.

McClure suffered a brain aneurysm in 1992, and died in Los Angeles, California, of complications from a stroke soon after.

Later compilation album releases included Younger Man Blues (Shanachie, 1994) and an earlier joint album with Willie Clayton, Bobby McClure & Willie Clayton (Hi Records, 1992).

== Discography ==
=== Albums ===
- The Cherry (1988)

=== Singles ===
| Year | Single | Peak chart positions | |
| Year | Single | US R&B | US Pop |
|---|---|---|---|
| 1965 | "I'm Not Ashamed" | — | — |
| 1965 | "Don't Mess Up a Good Thing" (with Fontella Bass) | 5 | 33 |
| 1965 | "You'll Miss Me (When I'm Gone)" (with Fontella Bass) | 27 | 91 |
| 1966 | "Peak of Love" | 16 | 97 |
| 1967 | "Baby, You Don't Love Me" | — | — |
| 1981 | "You've Got the Makings" | — | — |
| 1987 | "You Never Miss Your Water" | — | — |
| 1987 | "It Feels So Good (To Be Back Home)" | ― | ― |
| 1989 | "I Need a Job" | — | ― |
"—" denotes releases that did not chart or were not released.
