= Cullendale, Arkansas =

Unincorporated community in Arkansas, US

Coordinates: 33°32′21″N 92°49′21″W

Cullendale is an unincorporated community in Ouachita County, Arkansas, United States. It is part of the Camden Micropolitan Statistical Area and lies at an elevation of 128 ft.

The singer Little Willie John was born in Cullendale in 1937.
