= Martha Bass =

American musical artist (1921–1998)

- Born: March 7, 1921
- Died: September 21, 1998 (aged 77) St. Louis, Missouri, U.S.
- Genres: gospel
- Occupation: singer

Martha Bass (March 7, 1921 – September 21, 1998) was an American gospel singer.

Martha Bass was born in Arkansas, the daughter of Nevada Carter, described in the St. Louis Beacon as a gospel singer of some renown, and migrated to St. Louis as a young girl, where she joined the Pleasant Green Baptist Church, where she was a gospel vocalist. She came under the tutelage of Mother Willie Mae Ford Smith, the head of the Soloists Beareau in gospel composer Thomas A. Dorsey's National Convention of Gospel Choirs and Choruses and the founder of the St. Louis Chapter of the organization, and it was there that she developed her "house wrecker" vocal style.

With Mother Ford's teaching and a wealth of church singing experience under her belt, she left St. Louis in the early 1950s to travel with the great Clara Ward Singers, but left after one year. Only one recording, "Wasn't it a Pity How They Punished my Lord", remains of her time with the Clara Ward Singers.

In the 1960s her album, "I'm So Grateful", established her as a gospel singer of the first rank. When her daughter Fontella Bass returned to her gospel roots, Martha Bass cut several tracks with Fontella and Martha's son, the gospel singer David Peaston. Martha was married to James Peaston (1914–1981). Her grandson Bahnamous Lee Bowie, son of Fontella Bass and jazz trumpeter Lester Bowie, co-produced and played keyboards on Fontella's gospel-jazz album Travellin' (Justin Time Records, 2001), continuing the family's gospel tradition into the next generation.

In 1970, Bass recorded 'Walk With Me Lord' with the Harold Smith Majestics Choir with Checker Records. The song was featured in Selma, the 2014 Ava DuVarnay film through Geffen Records and Universal Music Enterprises.
