= Fred Hughes (singer) =

American R&B singer

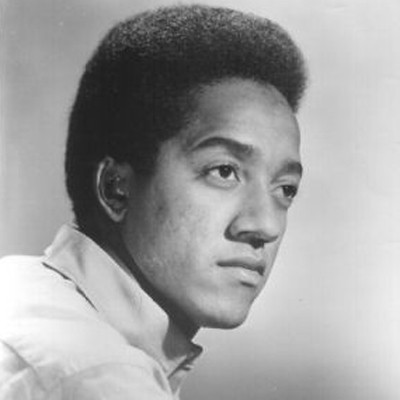
- Circa 1970

Background information
- Birth name: Fred Henry Hughes
- Born: Arkansas, U.S.
- Genres: R&B
- Occupation: Singer
- Website: www.freddiehughes.com

Fred Henry Hughes is an American R&B singer.

== Early life ==
Hughes was born in Arkansas, but moved to Compton, California. He first recorded while a student at Compton High School as a member of the Cymbals in 1962, and worked as a member of a band, the Creators.

Hughes was signed up for Vee-Jay Records by the label's A&R chief on the West Coast in the 1960s shortly before its demise, scoring hits in 1965 with the singles "Oo Wee Baby, I Love You" (number 3 R&B and number 23 Pop) and "You Can't Take It Away" (another top 20 R&B hit, number 96 Pop), written and produced by Richard Parker. Released in Britain on the Fontana label, "Oo Wee Baby" became a soul classic and was re-released in 1976 by DJM Records because of demand, according to the record's picture sleeve.

The singer's career struggled after his label's collapse, although he had a couple of Richard Parker-produced singles released on Exodus, run by Vee-Jay personnel briefly in 1966, and another two later on Chess Records.

In 1969, Hughes signed with another Chicago label, Brunswick Records and although failing to reach the pop charts, two releases for the label became R&B successes, "Baby Boy" at number 25 and "I Understand" at number 45. An album was later released by Brunswick featuring the two hits.

According to his blog, Fred Hughes is often confused with Freddie Hughes, an Oakland, California recording artist, and Castlemont High School graduate. The 1988 edition of Joel Whitburn's Billboard-based book Top R&B Singles lists releases by both artists together as if they were one artist, whilst AllMusic Guide's brief biography of Fred Hughes conflates the two artists, but in later editions of Whitburn's Top Pop Singles it separates the two artists, as of the 1994 edition.

In 2014, Fred Hughes' "Baby Boy", a favorite on the UK's Northern soul scene, was featured in the film Northern Soul.
