= Little Willie John =

American R&B singer (1937–1968)

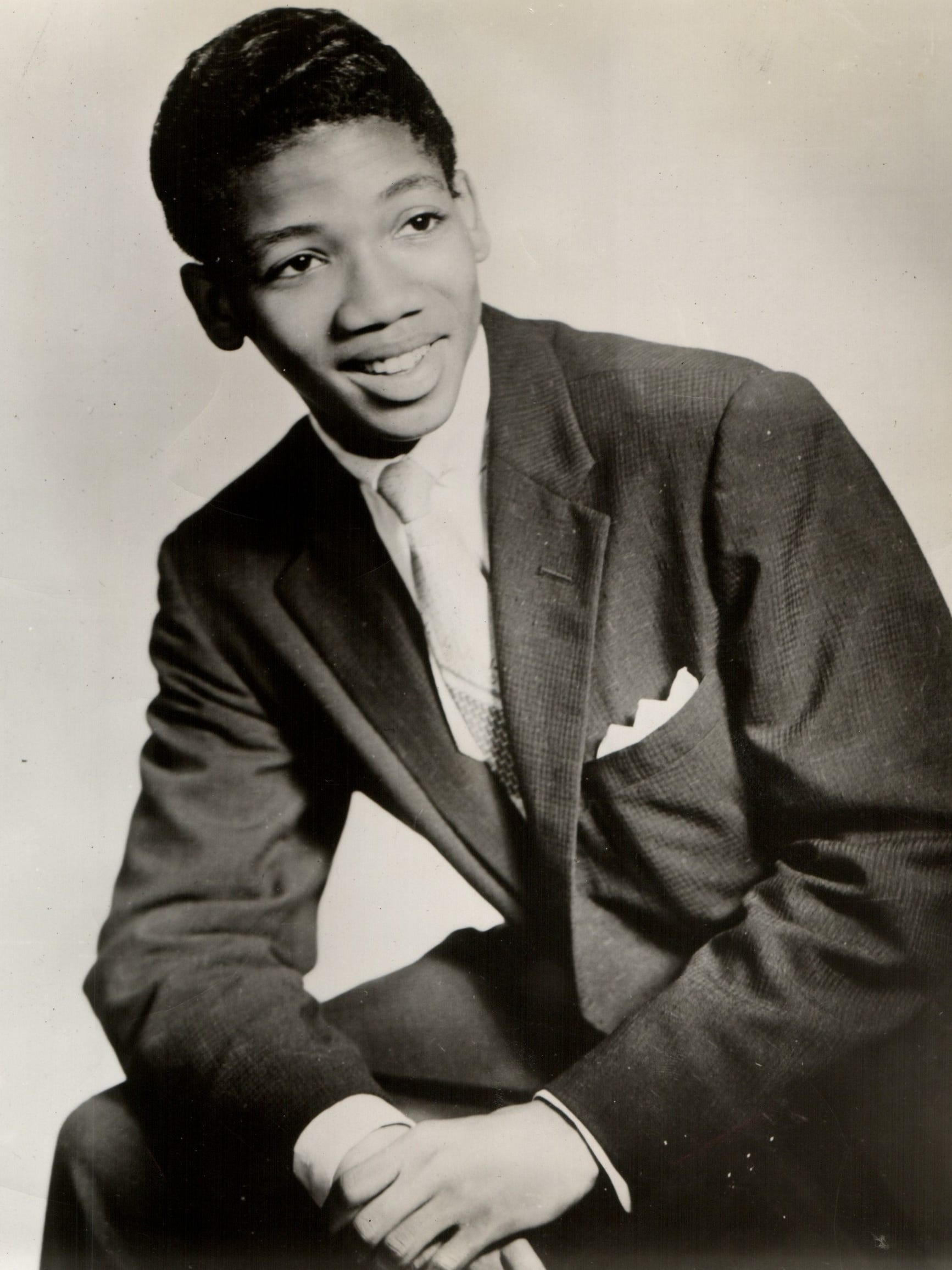
- Little Willie John, c. 1955

Background information
- Born: William Edward John; November 15, 1937; Cullendale, Arkansas, U.S.
- Origin: Detroit, Michigan, U.S.
- Died: May 26, 1968 (aged 30) Walla Walla, Washington, U.S.
- Genres: R&B; Soul
- Occupations: Singer, songwriter
- Years active: 1955–1968
- Label: King Records

William Edward "Little Willie" John (November 15, 1937 – May 26, 1968) was an American R&B singer who performed in the 1950s and early 1960s. He is best known for his successes on the record charts, with songs such as "All Around the World" (1955), "Need Your Love So Bad" (1956), "Talk to Me, Talk to Me" (1958), "Leave My Kitten Alone" (1960), "Sleep" (1960), and his number-one R&B hit "Fever" (1956).

An important figure in R&B music of the 1950s, he faded into obscurity in the 1960s and died while serving a prison sentence for manslaughter. John was posthumously inducted into the Rock and Roll Hall of Fame in 1996. In 2022, John was inducted into the Blues Hall of Fame.

== Early life ==
William Edward John was born in Cullendale, Arkansas, on November 15, 1937. He was one of ten children born to Lillie (née Robinson) and Mertis John. Many sources erroneously give his middle name as Edgar. His family moved to Detroit, Michigan, when he was four, so that his father could find factory work. In the late 1940s, the eldest children, including Willie, formed a gospel singing group.

== Career ==
Willie also performed in talent shows, which brought him to the notice of Johnny Otis and, later, the musician and producer Henry Glover. After seeing him sing with the Paul "Hucklebuck" Williams orchestra, Glover signed him to a recording contract with King Records in 1955. He was nicknamed "Little Willie" for his short stature.

John's first recording, a version of Titus Turner's "All Around the World", was a hit, reaching number 5 on the Billboard R&B chart. He followed up with a string of R&B hits, including the original version of "Need Your Love So Bad", co-written with his elder brother Mertis John Jr. One of his biggest hits, "Fever" (1956) (Pop number 24, R&B number 1), sold over one million copies and was awarded a gold disc. A famous cover version was recorded by Peggy Lee in 1958. Another song, "Talk to Me, Talk to Me", recorded in 1958, reached number 5 on the R&B chart and number 20 on the Pop chart. It also sold over one million copies. A few years later it was a hit once again in a cover version by Sunny & the Sunglows. On December 23, 1959, John also recorded "I'm Shakin'", by Rudy Toombs, "Suffering with the Blues", "My Love Is," and "Sleep" (1960, Pop number 13). In all, John made the Billboard Hot 100 a total of fourteen times. A cover version of "Need Your Love So Bad" by Fleetwood Mac was also a hit in Europe. Another of his songs to be covered was "Leave My Kitten Alone" (1959), recorded by The Beatles in 1964 and intended for their Beatles for Sale album. However, the track was not released until 1995.

John performed for the famed Cavalcade of Jazz concert produced by Leon Hefflin Sr. held at the Shrine Auditorium in Los Angeles on August 3, 1958 with The Upsetters as his band. The other headliners were Ernie Freeman and his Band, Ray Charles, Sam Cooke, The Clark Kids and Bo Rhambo. Sammy Davis Jr. was there to crown the winner of the Miss Cavalcade of Jazz beauty contest. The event featured the top four prominent disc jockeys of Los Angeles. John was dropped by his record company, King Records, in 1963.

== Personal life ==
John was survived by his wife Darlynn (née Bonner), whom he married on May 25, 1957; two children, William Kevin John (b. February 3, 1958) and Darryl Keith John (b. January 25, 1960); his mother; five brothers; three sisters. One of his sisters was Mable John, who recorded for Motown and Stax and was a member of The Raelettes, the vocal quartette backing Ray Charles. His son Keith John is a backing vocalist for Stevie Wonder.

John was involved in the civil rights fight against segregation. He performed a benefit concert for the NAACP in 1964, telling Jet magazine: "As entertainers, we can no longer sit and wait for the Sammy Davises and Harry Belafontes to raise all of the money."

=== Manslaughter arrest ===
John was also known for his short temper and propensity to abuse alcohol. He was arrested multiple times for charges that include narcotics, swindling, and grand larceny. In 1965, he was convicted of manslaughter for the 1964 stabbing of Kendall Roundtree in Seattle. He was sent to Washington State Penitentiary in Walla Walla. John appealed the conviction and was released on probation while the case was reconsidered, during which time he recorded what was intended to be his comeback album. Due to contractual disputes and the decline of his appeal, it was not released until 2008 (as Nineteen Sixty Six).

== Death ==
John died at Washington State Penitentiary on May 26, 1968. Despite counterclaims, the cause of death stated on his death certificate was a heart attack. His interment was in Detroit Memorial Park East, in Warren, Michigan.

== Legacy and honors ==
John was posthumously inducted into the Rock and Roll Hall of Fame in 1996, presented by Stevie Wonder. James Brown, who early in his career had opened shows for John, recorded a tribute album, Thinking About Little Willie John and a Few Nice Things, recorded and released a few months after John's death.

The guitarist and songwriter Robbie Robertson, formerly of The Band, mentioned John in the song "Somewhere Down the Crazy River", on his 1987 self-titled album. John was also mentioned in Tom Russell's "Blue Wing" and Mark Lanegan's "Like Little Willie John", from his 2004 album Bubblegum. The Swedish singer songwriter Peter LeMarc recorded a song entitled "Little Willie John" in 1991.

A biography, Fever: Little Willie John, a Fast Life, Mysterious Death and the Birth of Soul, by Susan Whitall with Kevin John (another of his sons), was published by Titan Books in 2011. Little Willie John was posthumously inducted into the Rhythm and Blues Music Hall of Fame in 2014 as a singer and in 2016 as a songwriter. In June 2016, Little Willie John was inducted into the Michigan Rock and Roll Legends Hall of Fame.

In 2022, John was inducted into the Blues Hall of Fame. His induction citation noted "... John was a sharply attired and exciting showstopper, recalled by fellow singers as mischievous, fun-loving, and generous".

== Singles discography ==
Year	Titles (A-side, B-side) Both sides are from same album except where indicated	Label & Cat. No.	U.S. R&B	U.S. Pop	Album
1955	"All Around the World" b/w "Don't Leave Me Dear" (from Mister Little Willie John)	King 4818	5	-	Fever
1956	"Need Your Love So Bad"	King 4841	5	-	Fever
1956	"Home At Last"	King 4841	6	-	Mister Little Willie John
1956	"Are You Ever Coming Back" b/w "I'm Stickin' with You Baby" (from Fever)	King 4893	-	-	Mister Little Willie John
1956	"Fever"	King 4935	1	24	Fever
1956	"Letter from My Darling"	King 4935	10	-	Fever
1956	"Do Something for Me" b/w "My Nerves"	King 4960	15	-	Fever
1956	"I've Been Around" b/w "Sufferin' With The Blues"	King 4989	-	-	
1956	"Will the Sun Shine Tomorrow" b/w "A Little Bit of Loving"	King 5003	-	-	Mister Little Willie John
1957	"Love, Life and Money" b/w "You Got to Get Up Early in the Morning" (from Mister Little Willie John)	King 5023	-	-	Fever
1957	"I've Got to Go Cry" b/w "Look What You've Done to Me" (from Mister Little Willie John)	King 5045	-	-	Fever
1957	"Young Girl" b/w "If I Thought You Needed Me" (from Talk to Me)	King 5066	-	-	Fever
1957	"Dinner Date" b/w "Uh Uh Baby (No No Baby)" (from Talk to Me)	King 5083	-	-	Fever
1957	"Person to Person" b/w "Until You Do"	King 5091	-	-	Talk to Me
1958	"Talk to Me, Talk to Me" b/w "Spasms" (from Mister Little Willie John)	King 5108	5	20	Talk to Me
1958	"You're a Sweetheart" b/w "Let's Rock While the Rockin's Good"	King 5142	14	66	Mister Little Willie John
1958	"Tell It Like It Is" b/w "Don't Be Ashamed to Call My Name"	King 5147	12	-	Talk to Me
1958	"Why Don't You Haul Off and Love Me" b/w "All My Love Belongs to You"	King 5154	-	-	Mister Little Willie John
1958	"No Regrets" b/w "I'll Carry Your Love Wherever I Go" (from Talk to Me)	King 5170	-	-	In Action
1959	"Made for Me" b/w "No More in Life" (from Talk to Me)	King 5179	-	-	In Action
1959	"Leave My Kitten Alone" b/w "Let Nobody Love You"	King 5219	13	60	In Action
1959	"Let Them Talk" b/w "Right There"	King 5274	11	100	In Action
1960	"Loving Care" b/w "My Love Is"	King 5318	-	-	Sure Things
1960	"A Cottage for Sale" b/w "I'm Shakin'"	King 5342	-	63	Sure Things
1960	"Heartbreak (It's Hurtin' Me)" b/w "Do You Love Me" (from In Action)	King 5356	6	38	Sure Things
1960	"Sleep" b/w "There's a Difference"	King 5394	10	13	Sure Things
1961	"Walk Slow" b/w "You Hurt Me"	King 5428	21	48	Sure Things
1961	"Leave My Kitten Alone" b/w "I'll Never Go Back on My Word"; A-side chart reentry	King 5452	-	60	In Action
1961	"The Very Thought of You" b/w "I'm Sorry"	King 5458	-	61	Sure Things
1961	"Flamingo" /	King 5503	17	-	The Sweet, the Hot, the Teen-Age Beat
1961	"(I've Got) Spring Fever"	King 5503	25	71	The Sweet, the Hot, the Teen-Age Beat
1961	"Take My Love (I Want to Give It All to You)" /	King 5516	5	87	The Sweet, the Hot, the Teen-Age Beat
1961	"Now You Know"	King 5516	-	93	The Sweet, the Hot, the Teen-Age Beat
1961	"Need Your Love So Bad" b/w "Drive Me Home" (from Talk to Me)	King 5539	-	-	Fever
1961	"There Is Someone in This World for Me" b/w "Autumn Leaves" (from The Sweet, the Hot, the Teen-Age Beat)	King 5577	-	-	Talk to Me
1962	"Fever" (with added strings) b/w "Bo-Da-Ley Didd-Ley" (non-album track)	King 5591	-	-	Fever
1962	"The Masquerade Is Over" b/w "Katanga" (non-album track)	King 5602	-	-	Little Willie John at a Recording Session
1962	"Until Again My Love" b/w "Mister Glenn"	King 5628	-	-	Little Willie John at a Recording Session
1962	"Every Beat of My Heart" b/w "I Wish I Could Cry" (from Little Willie John at a Recording Session)	King 5641	-	-	The Sweet, the Hot, the Teen-Age Beat
1962	"She Thinks I Still Care" b/w "Come Back to Me"	King 5667	-	-	Non-album tracks
1962	"Big Blue Diamonds" b/w "Doll Face"	King 5681	-	-	Little Willie John at a Recording Session
1962	"Without a Friend" b/w "Half a Love"	King 5694	-	-	Little Willie John at a Recording Session
1963	"Heaven All Around Me" b/w "Don't Play with Love"	King 5717	-	-	Little Willie John at a Recording Session
1963	"My Baby's in Love with Another Guy" b/w "Come On Sugar" (non-album track)	King 5744	-	-	Little Willie John at a Recording Session
1963	"Let Them Talk" b/w "Talk to Me" (from Talk to Me)	King 5799	-	-	In Action
1963	"So Lovely" b/w "Inside Information" (non-album track)	King 5818	-	-	The Sweet, the Hot, the Teen-Age Beat
1963	"Person to Person" b/w "I'm Shakin'" (from Sure Things)	King 5823	-	-	Talk to Me
1964	"My Love Will Never Change" b/w "Bill Bailey" (from Little Willie John at a Recording Session)	King 5850	-	-	Non-album track
1964	"It Only Hurts a Little While" b/w "Rock Love" (from The Sweet, the Hot, the Teen-Age Beat)	King 5870	-	-	In Action
1964	"All Around the World" b/w "All My Love Belongs to You" (from Mister Little Willie John)	King 5886	-	-	Fever
1964	"Do Something for Me" b/w "Don't You Know I'm in Love" (non-album track)	King 5949	-	-	Fever
1965	"Talk to Me, Talk to Me" b/w "Take My Love (I Want to Give It All to You)" (from The Sweet, the Hot, the Teen-Age Beat)	King 6003	-	-	Talk to Me
1968	"Fever" b/w "Let Them Talk" (from In Action)	King 6170	-	-	Fever
1970	"All Around the World" b/w "Need Your Love So Bad"	King 6302	-	-	Fever
