= Leon Claxton =

American vaudeville performer

Leon Dunkins Claxton (April 5, 1902 – November 14, 1967) was an American vaudeville performer turned producer who led the revue Harlem in Havana, which was staged for several decades and was a feature at the traveling Royal American Shows. An African American, his show featured black performers during the segregation era, and he came to be described as "one of the first African-Americans to find great success and infamy in the outdoor entertainment industry". Claxton also built a resort hotel for African Americans in Tampa, Florida.

== Biography ==
Claxton was born in Memphis, Tennessee. His father, Overton (O.C.) Claxton, was a drummer who played in W. C. Handy's band. When young, Leon joined Ringling Bros. and Barnum & Bailey Circus as a water boy for the elephants, and toured the U.S. By the age of 16, he appeared in shows as a contortionist, and in the 1920s featured in vaudeville shows in Chicago.

By the early 1930s, he had begun producing shows with African American entertainers, including the Cotton Club Showboat at the Century of Progress World's Fair in Chicago in 1934. He took over responsibility for the colored section of the Royal American Shows, and debuted his first girl show, Hep Cats, in 1936. His Harlem In Havana shows, incorporating music, dancing and comedy, became the main feature of the Royal American Shows, which toured widely in the U.S. and Canada. The shows were performed in Claxton's 1,600-seater tent during the summer season, and in winter played in nightclubs and theaters.

Claxton settled in Tampa, Florida, where he built the Claxton Manor hotel. It was one of a small number of hotels for African American performers, athletes, and business people in the American South. Claxton won Tampa's Citizen of the Year Award in 1959. As part of the Dads Club, he was part of a donation of cooled water drinking fountains to Blake High School.

Claxton married Gwendolyn Bates in Saskatoon, Canada, in 1938. She became co-producer of his shows.

He died in Tampa in 1967.

== Legacy ==
Filmmaker Leslie Cunningham is working on an hour-long documentary film called "Jig Show: Leon Claxton's Harlem in Havana".
