= All Around the World (Little Willie John song) =

"All Around the World" is a 1955 hit song by Little Willie John written by Titus Turner. The song was the debut single and first hit for Little Willie John, and a hit in 1969 for Little Milton, renamed as "Grits Ain't Groceries". Milton's version reached No. 5 on the US Billboard R&B chart, and No. 73 on the Billboard Hot 100. James Booker also covered the song on his album Classified, and Leigh Harris and Larry Sieberth covered it on the album Patchwork: A Tribute to James Booker. Edwin Starr recorded the track for his 1970 LP War & Peace on Motown Records. Lou Rawls also covered the song on for Blue Note Records, on his album It's Supposed to Be Fun, released January 1, 1990, which became a hit.

== Lyrics ==
The song is a profession of the singer's love for someone addressed as "my baby", describing what else would not be true if he does not love his woman. Each verse ends with this refrain:

Well, if I don't love you, baby
Grits ain't groceries
Eggs ain't poultry
And Mona Lisa was a man.
