= Les Stances a Sophie =

Soundtrack album by Art Ensemble of Chicago
- Released: 1970
- Recorded: July 22, 1970
- Studio: Pathé Marconi, Boulogne, France
- Genre: Avant-garde jazz
- Length: 33:46
- Label: Pathé-Marconi
- Producer: Hubert Merial

Art Ensemble of Chicago chronology
Chi-Congo (1970)	Les Stances a Sophie (1970)	Live in Paris (1970)

Les Stances a Sophie is a 1970 soundtrack album by the Art Ensemble of Chicago recorded in Paris for a French film of the same name directed by Moshé Mizrahi. It was released on the Pathé Marconi label in France and on Nessa Records in the U.S. It features performances by Lester Bowie, Joseph Jarman, Roscoe Mitchell, Malachi Favors Maghostut, Fontella Bass and Don Moye. Moshé Mizrahi commissioned the original music for the film when the band had only two weeks left on their French visas. It was reissued on CD in 2000 by Universal Sound Records, mastered from a (fairly quiet) vinyl source. The album was remastered and reissued in 2023 by the Berlin-based music label play loud! productions as a limited-edition vinyl release, licensed from Warner Music and augmented with new liner notes by veteran U.S. music journalist Chris Morris.

== Reception ==
Rolling Stone writer Robert Palmer observed: "Sophie is a film score and the group essays bop, free music, a neo-dixieland and pounding R&B. There are saxophone solos by Joseph Jarman and Roscoe Mitchell, solid walking from bassist Malachi Favors, aggressive percussion from Don Moye and a searing Fontella Bass vocal." AllMusic reviewer Brian Olewnick called the album "one of the landmark records of the burgeoning avant-garde of the time and, simply put, one of the greatest jazz albums ever." The Rolling Stone Jazz Record Guide wrote that "Les Stances has some of the group's most varied playing."

Professional ratings
Review scores
Source	Rating
AllMusic	4.5/5 stars
DownBeat	5/5 stars
The Rolling Stone Jazz Record Guide	5/5 stars

== Track listing ==
1. "Theme de Yoyo" - 9:10
2. "Theme de Celine" - 3:04
3. "Variations Sur un Theme de Monteverdi I" - 3:02
4. "Variations Sur un Theme de Monteverdi II" - 1:50
5. "Proverbes No. 1" - 2:38
6. "Theme Amour Universal" - 3:51
7. "Theme Libre" - 8:49
8. "Proverbes No. 2" - 1:22

All compositions by the Art Ensemble of Chicago except lyrics of "Theme de Yoyo" by Noreen Beasley

- Recorded July 22, 1970 in Paris
- Theme for track 3 and 4 is Lasciatemi Morire from L'Arianna by Claudio Monteverdi

== Personnel ==
- Lester Bowie: trumpet, percussion instruments
- Malachi Favors Maghostut: bass, percussion instruments, vocals
- Joseph Jarman: saxophones, clarinets, percussion instruments
- Roscoe Mitchell: saxophones, clarinets, flute, percussion instruments
- Fontella Bass: vocals, piano
- Don Moye: drums, percussion
