= Jackie Ross =

American soul singer (born 1946)

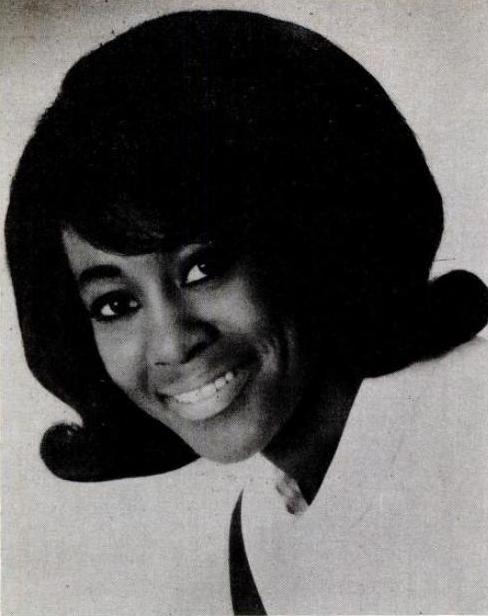
Ross in 1965

Jaculyn Bless "Jackie" Ross (born January 30, 1946) is an American soul singer.

Born in St. Louis, Missouri, United States, Ross sang gospel music as a child, and performed on a radio show run by her parents, both preachers. After her father died in 1954 she moved to Chicago, and was signed to SAR Records by Sam Cooke. Her first single "Hard Times" appeared in 1962, and following this she spent time singing in Syl Johnson's band.

In 1964, she signed with Chess Records and released "Selfish One", which reached number 11 on the U.S. Billboard Hot 100, number 4 on the Cashbox R&B chart, and number 5 on the Canadian RPM chart. A follow-up, "I've Got the Skill", reached the Hot 100 but stalled at number 89 and the following year, "Jerk and Twine", a re-working of "Everything But Love", the song on the other side of her big hit, peaked at number 85. Another single, "Haste Makes Waste," reached number 126 in 1964.

An album, Full Bloom, was released in 1965, which was followed by three more singles, but after disputes with her record label, she left Chess in 1967. She later recorded for several labels well into the 1970s, such as Brunswick and Jerry Butler's Fountain Productions. Most of her later recordings were produced by her manager, Jimmy Vanleer's production company and issued on various labels, including GSF, Mercury and Capitol and Vanleer's own Golden Ear label, but she was unable to duplicate the success of "Selfish One".
