= David Peaston =

American R&B and gospel singer (1957–2012)

- Born: March 13, 1957; St. Louis, Missouri, U.S.
- Died: February 1, 2012 (aged 54); St. Louis, Missouri, U.S.
- Genres: Soul, gospel
- Occupation: Singer
- Years active: 1981–2006
- Labels: Geffen, MCA
- Relatives: Fontella Bass (sister)

David Peaston (March 13, 1957 – February 1, 2012) was an American R&B and gospel singer who in 1990 won a Soul Train Music Award for Best R&B/Soul or Rap New Artist. He was mostly known for the singles "Two Wrongs (Don't Make it Right)" and "Can I?", the latter of which was originally recorded by Eddie Kendricks.

== Life and career ==
Peaston was a native of Saint Louis, Missouri, United States. As a child, he attended the Pleasant Green Missionary Baptist Church along with his mother, Martha Bass, a member of The Clara Ward Singers gospel group. His sister was R&B/soul singer Fontella Bass.

He graduated from Northwest High School in St. Louis, Missouri. After graduating, he worked as a school teacher but, after being laid off in 1981, moved to New York City and began working as a background singer on recording sessions, including Lester Bowie's 1982 album, The One and Only (ECM). In the late 1980s, he won several competitions on the Showtime at the Apollo television show, winning over the audience with a powerful rendition of "God Bless the Child." In 1988, he appeared on the NBC TV show Sunday Night, episode #105, available on Youtube. His duo with Dianne Reeves of "Stormy Monday" was a hit. He was signed by Geffen Records, and his first single, "Two Wrongs (Don't Make It Right)" rose to no. 3 on the Billboard Black Singles chart in 1989. He had further hits on the R&B chart with "Can I?" (previously a hit for Eddie Kendricks), and "We're All in This Together", and released an album, Introducing...David Peaston. He also toured with Gerald Alston in Europe, and with Gladys Knight in the US, before moving to the MCA label in 1991, where he issued the album Mixed Emotions. In 1993 he recorded a gospel album with Fontella and Martha Bass entitled Promises: A Family Portrait Of Faith. In 2001, Peaston performed vocals on his sister Fontella Bass's gospel-jazz album Travellin' (Justin Time Records), alongside his nephew Bahnamous Lee Bowie on keyboards and co-production.

During the 1990s, Peaston was diagnosed with diabetes, and in 2004 had his legs amputated, forcing him to use prostheses. When he was preparing to be honored at the 2004 event "A Celebration of Love in St. Louis," he struggled with whether he had let his disease prevent him from ever performing on stage again. "I didn't want to be back in the public," he told the Post-Dispatch that year. "I wasn't embarrassed or ashamed, but I felt I let myself down and, therefore, I let everyone else down. It was my fault for being sick, and I didn't want anybody to see me like that." By 2004, however, he had lost 200 pounds, and sang with the St. Louis group the Distinguished Gents for five years. The group performed a mix of classical, jazz and gospel songs annually at the Ethical Society of St. Louis. He also toured Europe until his older sister, Fontella Bass, fell ill. In 2006, Peaston returned to studio and issued the album, Song Book: Songs of Soul & Inspiration. The album featured eight new tracks by Peaston, as well as several of his biggest hits.

David Peaston was also a veteran of traveling gospel plays such as "Momma Don't." Singer Cheryl Pepsii Riley toured with him in "Momma Don't" and other shows. He enlisted on the gospel show His Woman, His Wife: The Musical, touring across the U.S. In his last years, he still ran Pea-Stain Productions, his own production company.

Peaston died from complications of diabetes in St. Louis, Missouri, on February 1, 2012, at the age of 54.

== Discography ==
=== Albums ===
- Introducing...David Peaston (1989)
- Mixed Emotions (1991)

=== Singles ===
- "Two Wrongs (Don't Make It Right)" (1989). No. 3 R&B, No. 84 UK
- "Can I?" (1989). No. 14 R&B
- "We're All In This Together" (1990). No. 11 R&B, No. 45 Dance, No. 91 UK
- "Take Me Now" (1990). No. 77 R&B
- "String" (1991). No. 69 R&B
- "Luxury Of Love" (1991). No. 41 R&B
