= We're Gonna Make It (Little Milton song) =

Single by Little Milton

from the album We're Gonna Make It
- B-side: "Can't Hold Back the Tears"
- Released: 1965
- Recorded: 1965
- Studio: Chess Ter Mar Studio, Chicago, Illinois
- Genre: Blues
- Length: 2:32
- Label: Checker
- Songwriters: Gene Barge, Billy Davis, Raynard Miner & Carl William Smith

Little Milton singles chronology
"Blind Man" (1964)	"We're Gonna Make It" (1965)	"Who's Cheating Who?" (1965)

"We're Gonna Make It" is a 1965 R&B single written by Gene Barge, Billy Davis, Raynard Miner & Carl William Smith, and performed by Little Milton. The single is the only Top 40 entry of Little Milton's career and his highest charting R&B single, spending three weeks at number one on the U.S. R&B chart.

== Background ==
The lyrics of the song offer a civil-rights metaphor, depicting the signs of the time period in which the song was released.

== Cover versions ==
- The song was later covered by Millie Jackson on her 1982 album Hard Times.

== Chart positions ==
Chart (1965)	Peak position
U.S. Billboard Hot 100	25
U.S. Billboard Hot R&B Singles	1
