= Yanni discography =

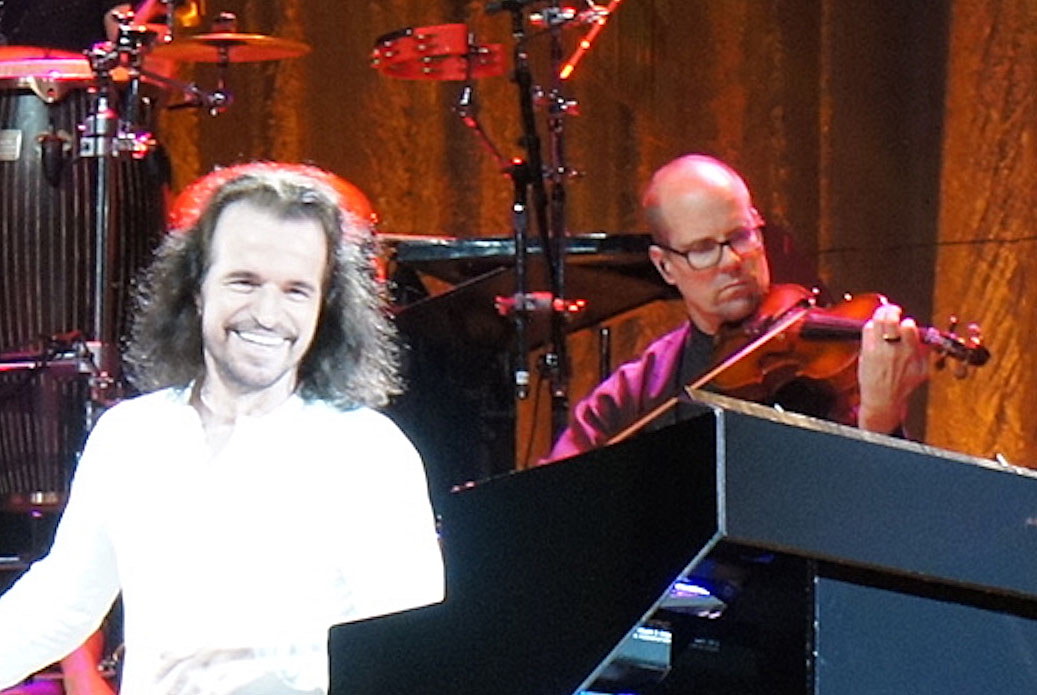
- Yanni with Benedikt Brydern in 2014
- Studio albums: 19
- Soundtrack albums: 8
- Live albums: 7
- Compilation albums: 25
- Singles: 7

The discography of the Greek contemporary instrumental musician Yanni includes 19 studio albums and eight live albums. In 1987 he put together a small band which included John Tesh and Charlie Adams, and began touring to promote his earliest instrumental albums, Keys to Imagination, Out of Silence, and Chameleon Days.

Dare to Dream was released in 1992. It was Yanni's first Grammy-nominated album and featured "Aria", a song based on The Flower Duet and popularized by an award-winning British Airways commercial. A second Grammy-nominated album, In My Time, was released in 1993. His music has been used extensively in television and televised sporting events, including the starting grids for the 1989, 1992, and 1994 Daytona 500s on CBS, Super Bowl, Wide World of Sports, U.S. Open, Tour de France, World Figure Skating Championships, The Olympics, and ABC News.

Yanni's breakthrough commercial success came with the release of his album and video, Live at the Acropolis, filmed on September 25, 1993 at the 2,000-year-old Herod Atticus Theater in Athens, Greece, and released in 1994. This was Yanni's first live album and utilized a full orchestra under the supervision of the Iranian conductor, Shahrdad Rohani, in addition to his core band. Subsequently, the concert was broadcast in the US on PBS and quickly became one of their most popular programs ever, having been seen in 65 countries by half a billion people. A composition from this album, "Acroyali/Standing in Motion", was determined to have the "Mozart Effect," by the Journal of the Royal Society of Medicine because it is similar to Mozart's K 448 in tempo, structure, melodic and harmonic consonance and predictability. He has appeared on several major PBS Pledge TV Specials such as A Decade of Excellence, including segments from Live at the Acropolis, Tribute, and Live at Royal Albert Hall, London.

== Albums ==
=== Studio albums ===
==== 1980s–1990s ====
Title	Album details	Peak chart positions		Certifications
Title	Album details	US	US New Age	Certifications
Optimystique	Released: 1984; Label: Varèse Sarabande	—	17	
Keys to Imagination	Released: 1986; Label: Private Music	—	—	
Out of Silence	Released: 1987; Label: Private Music	—	—	
Chameleon Days	Released: 1988; Label: Private Music	—	2	
Niki Nana	Released: 1989; Label: Private Music	—	2	
Dare to Dream	Released: 1992; Label: Private Music	32	2	MC: Platinum; RIAA: Platinum
In My Time	Released: 1993; Label: Private Music	24	1	MC: Gold; RIAA: Platinum
"—" denotes a recording that did not chart or was not released in that territory.

==== 2000s–2020s ====
Title	Album details	Peak chart positions			Certifications
Title	Album details	FRA	US	US New Age	Certifications
If I Could Tell You	Released: 2000; Label: Virgin	53	20	1	RIAA: Gold
Ethnicity	Released: 2003; Label: Virgin	—	27	1	
Yanni Voices	Released: 2009; Label: Yanni/Wake	—	20	1	
Yanni Voces	Released: 2009; Label: Yanni/Wake	—	— (Note: Yanni Voces did not enter the Billboard 200, but it peaked at number 12 on the Billboard Top Latin Albums chart.)	2	
Mexicanisimo	Released: 2010; Label: Venemusic	—	— (Note: Mexicanisimo did not enter the Billboard 200, but it peaked at number 31 on the Billboard Top Latin Albums chart.)	2	
Truth of Touch	Released: 2011; Label: Yanni/Wake	—	91	1	
My Passion for Mexico	Released: 2012; Label: Yanni/Wake	—	— (Note: My Passion for Mexico did not enter the Billboard 200, but it peaked at number 68 on the Billboard Top Latin Albums chart.)	5	
Inspirato	Released: 2014; Label: Sony Classical	—	— (Note: Inspirato did not enter the Billboard 200, but it peaked at number 2 on the Billboard Classical Albums chart.)	1	
Sensuous Chill	Released: 2016; Label: Portrait	—	173	1	
In His Purest Form	Released: 2020; Label: Yanniworks	—	—	—	
"—" denotes a recording that did not chart or was not released in that territory.

=== Live albums ===
Title	Album details	Peak chart positions										Certifications
Title	Album details	AUS	FRA	NLD	NZ	NOR	SWE	SWI	UK	US	US New Age	Certifications
Live at the Acropolis	Released: 1994; Label: Private Music	2	—	80	6	—	46	—	91	5	1	ARIA: Gold; MC: Platinum; RIAA: 4× Platinum
Live at Royal Albert Hall (video)	Released: 1995; Label: Private Music	—	—	—	—	—	—	—	—	—	—	
Tribute	Released: 1997; Label: Virgin	48	21	27	40	16	35	23	40	21	1	MC: Gold; RIAA: Platinum
Yanni Live! The Concert Event	Released: 2006; Label: Image Entertainment	—	—	—	—	—	—	—	—	84	1	
Yanni Voices (video)	Released: 2009; Label: Yanni/Wake	—	—	—	—	—	—	—	—	—	—	
Live at El Morro, Puerto Rico	Released: 2012; Label: Yanni/Wake	—	—	—	—	—	—	—	—	109	1	
The Dream Concert: Live from the Great Pyramids of Egypt	Released: 2016; Label: Sony Masterworks	—	—	—	—	—	—	—	—	—	1	
"—" denotes a recording that did not chart or was not released in that territory.

=== Charted compilations ===
Title	Album details	Peak chart positions					Certifications
Title	Album details	AUT	GER	NZ	US	US New Age	Certifications
Reflections of Passion	Released: 1990; Label: Private Music	—	—	—	29	1	MC: Platinum; RIAA: 2× Platinum
In Celebration of Life	Released: 1991; Label: Private Music	—	—	—	—	3	
Romantic Moments	Released: 1992; Label: BMG	32	13	—	—	—	
In the Mirror	Released: 1997; Label: Private Music	—	—	2	17	1	MC: Gold; RIAA: Gold
Port of Mystery	Released: 1997; Label: Windham Hill	—	—	—	142	4	
Nightbird	Released: 1997; Label: BMG	—	—	—	—	5	
Devotion: The Best of Yanni	Released: 1997; Label: Private Music	—	—	—	42	1	
Forbidden Dreams: Encore Collection, Volume 2	Released: 1998; Label: BMG	—	—	—	—	7	
Love Songs	Released: 1999; Label: Private Music	—	—	—	98	1	
Winter Light	Released: 1999; Label: Private Music	—	—	—	—	3	
Snowfall	Released: 2000; Label: BMG	—	—	—	—	3	
The Very Best of Yanni	Released: 2000; Label: Windham Hill	—	—	—	—	3	
Ultimate Yanni	Released: 2003; Label: BMG	—	—	—	74	1	
Super Hits	Released: 2007; Label: Sony BMG	—	—	—	—	9	
The Essential Yanni	Released: 2010; Label: Legacy	—	—	—	—	6	
"—" denotes a recording that did not chart or was not released in that territory.

=== Other compilations ===
- 1992 Yanni Gift Set (Reflections of Passion/In Celebration of Life), Private Music
- 1993 My World in Music - The Collection, BMG
- 1994 A Collection of Romantic Themes, Private Music
- 1997 Enraptured: A Collection of Yanni Favorites, BMG
- 1997 Enchanted: Music from the Heart, BMG
- 1997 Greatest Hits, BMG
- 1998 A Peaceful Place, BMG
- 1998 Sanctuary, BMG
- 1999 The Endless Dream, Unison
- 1999 Someday, Unison
- 1999 Songs from the Heart, BMG International
- 1999 The Private Years, Private Music
- 2000 Soaring Free (Disk 1), Madacy Distribution
- 2000 Whispers in the Dark, BMG
- 2002 Gold, BMG
- 2006 The Collection, Private Music
- 2008 Collections, Sony BMG
- 2010 The Inspiring Journey, Sony Music Distribution
- 2013 Playlist: The Very Best of Yanni, Windham Hill Records

=== Soundtracks ===
- 1988 Nitti: The Enforcer
- 1988 Steal the Sky
- 1988 Heart of Midnight
- 1989 I Love You Perfect
- 1990 Children of the Bride
- 1990 She'll Take Romance
- 1990 When You Remember Me
- 1994 Hua qi Shao Lin
- 2015 Hexi Corridor

== Singles ==
- 2013 "East Meets West"
- 2015 "Seven Billion Dreams"
- 2018 "When Dreams Come True"
- 2018 "Speed Demon"
- 2019 "Ladyhawk"
- 2019 "Blue"
- 2019 "Into the Deep Blue"
