= Snowfall (Yanni album) =

Compilation album by Yanni
- Released: March 7, 2000
- Recorded: 1980–1993
- Genre: Instrumental
- Length: 38:50
- Label: BMG Special Products
- Producer: Yanni

Yanni chronology
The Private Years (1999)	Snowfall (2000)	If I Could Tell You (2000)

Professional ratings
Review scores
Source	Rating
AllMusic	3/5 stars

Snowfall is a compilation album by Keyboardist Yanni, released in 2000. The album peaked at #3 on Billboard's "Top New Age Albums" chart in the same year.

The album was composed of tracks from 1980 to 1993 and released on the label BMG Special Products even though the songs themselves were originally released on Private Music.

== Track listing ==
Beside each track is the song's original album and release year:

No.	Title	Original Album	Length
1.	"After the Sunrise"	Out of Silence (1987)	4:38
2.	"In the Morning Light"	In My Time (1993)	3:48
3.	"Enchantment"	In My Time (1993)	3:51
4.	"True Nature"	Reflections of Passion (1990)	4:35
5.	"Turn of the Tide"	Optimystique (1980)	3:52
6.	"Only a Memory"	In My Time (1993)	4:18
7.	"Nostalgia"	Keys to Imagination (1986)	4:27
8.	"A Word in Private"	Chameleon Days (1988)	3:44
9.	"One Man's Dream"	In My Time (1993)	4:18
10.	"Farewell"	Reflections of Passion (1990)	2:46
