= The Private Years =

Box set by Yanni
- Released: October 12, 1999
- Genres: Instrumental; Easy listening
- Length: 288:36
- Label: Private Music
- Producer: Yanni

Yanni chronology
Winter Light (1999)	The Private Years (1999)	Snowfall (2000)

Professional ratings
Review scores
Source	Rating
AllMusic	4/5 stars

The Private Years is a box set released by Private Music in 1999. It features five of Yanni's albums for Private Music: Reflections of Passion, In Celebration of Life, Dare to Dream, In My Time, and Live at the Acropolis, as well as the DVD of his concert film, Live at the Acropolis.

== Track listing ==
Disc 1

No.	Title	Length
1.	"In the Morning Light"	3:49
2.	"One Man's Dream"	2:43
3.	"Before I Go"	4:30
4.	"Enchantment"	3:51
5.	"The End of August"	4:51
6.	"To Take... To Hold"	4:01
7.	"In the Mirror"	4:04
8.	"Felitsa"	4:51
9.	"Whispers in the Dark"	5:24
10.	"Only a Memory"	4:15
11.	"Until the Last Moment"	6:22

Disc 2

No.	Title	Length
1.	"After the Sunrise"	4:38
2.	"The Mermaid"	3:47
3.	"Quiet Man"	4:33
4.	"Nostalgia"	4:29
5.	"Almost a Whisper"	3:08
6.	"The Rain Must Fall"	4:37
7.	"Acroyali"	5:05
8.	"Farewell"	2:46
9.	"Swept Away"	5:09
10.	"True Nature"	4:35
11.	"Secret Vows"	3:58
12.	"Flight of Fantasy"	5:41
13.	"A Word in Private"	3:45
14.	"First Touch"	3:00
15.	"Reflections of Passion"	4:35

Disc 3

No.	Title	Length
1.	"Santorini"	4:34
2.	"Song for Antarctica"	4:23
3.	"Marching Season"	5:34
4.	"Walkabout"	4:32
5.	"Keys to Imagination"	5:13
6.	"Looking Glass"	6:35
7.	"Someday"	4:34
8.	"Within Attraction"	4:12
9.	"Standing in Motion"	5:20
10.	"Sand Dance"	5:10

Disc 4

No.	Title	Length
1.	"Santorini"	6:57
2.	"Keys to Imagination"	7:34
3.	"Until the Last Moment"	6:37
4.	"The Rain Must Fall"	7:24
5.	"Acroyali/Standing in Motion (Medley)"	8:50
6.	"One Man's Dream"	3:35
7.	"Within Attraction"	7:46
8.	"Nostalgia"	5:46
9.	"Swept Away"	9:21
10.	"Reflections of Passion"	5:22

Disc 5

No.	Title	Length
1.	"Once Upon a Time"	3:51
2.	"A Love for Life"	5:07
3.	"Nice to Meet You"	5:35
4.	"So Long My Friend"	3:47
5.	"You Only Live Once"	7:19
6.	"To the One Who Knows"	5:37
7.	"Face in the Photograph"	3:47
8.	"Felitsa"	4:45
9.	"Desire"	5:00
10.	"Aria"	3:58
11.	"A Night to Remember"	5:47
12.	"In the Mirror"	4:07

DVD Track listing

1. "Santorini"
2. "Until the Last Moment"
3. "Keys to Imagination"
4. "The Rain Must Fall"
5. "Felitsa"
6. "Within Attraction"
7. "One Man's Dream"
8. "Marching Season"
9. "Nostalgia"
10. "Acroyali/Standing in Motion (Medley)"
11. "Aria"
12. "Reflections of Passion"
13. "Swept Away"
14. "The End of August"

== Personnel ==
=== Performers ===
- Charlie Adams – acoustic and electronic drums
- Osama Afifi – bass
- Charlie Bisharat – violin
- Karen Briggs – violin
- Michael Bruno – percussion
- Ric Fierabracci – bass
- Endre Granat – violin
- Julie Homi – keyboards
- Bradley Joseph – keyboards
- Sachi McHenry – cello
- Mona Lisa – vocals
- Shardad Rohani – conductor

=== Production ===
- Peter Baumann – producer
- Chris Bellman – mastering
- Richard Boukas – arranger
- Jeff Buswell – drums/bass technician
- Dione Dirito – publicity
- Bryan Faris
- Peter Feldman – stage manager
- Lynn Goldsmith – photography
- Bernie Grundman – mastering
- Tom Hanlon – stage manager
- David "Gurn" Kaniski – artwork, production coordination
- Curtis Kelly – monitor engineer
- Jeff D. Klein – management
- Diane Kramer – numerical editing, tour accountant
- Tracy Kunstmann – sound technician
- Peter Maher – keyboard technician
- Kevin Mazur – photography
- Tod Metz – lighting technician
- Norman Moore – artwork, art direction
- Andy Rose – recorder
- Lee Rose – video director
- Paul Serault – monitor mixer
- Jerry Steckling – engineer
- Tom Sterling – mixing
- Gus Thomson – lighting supervisor
- Yanni – producer, engineer, mixing
