= In Celebration of Life =

Compilation album by Yanni
- Released: November 12, 1991
- Genre: Instrumental
- Length: 50:23
- Label: Private Music
- Producers: Peter Baumann; Yanni

Yanni chronology
Reflections of Passion (1990)	In Celebration of Life (1991)	Romantic Moments (1992)

In Celebration of Life is the second compilation album and seventh album overall by Greek keyboardist and composer Yanni, released on the Private Music label in 1991. The album peaked at #3 on Billboard's Top New Age Albums chart and at #60 on the Billboard 200 in the same year.

== Background ==
Yanni expresses the euphoria of life's greatest moments in this collection of 10 powerful and uplifting works. Like its predecessor, Reflections of Passion, it consisted mostly of songs taken from Yanni's four previous albums. Unlike Reflections of Passion, it did not include any new material nor any songs from Yanni's debut album, Optimystique. However, it did include one song ("Song for Antarctica") taken from a multi-artist benefit album, Polar Shift.

To support the album, Yanni embarked on a 30-city tour called the Revolution in Sound Tour, which consists of two other keyboardists that will use 35 synthesizers to replicate the studio version of the songs, a percussion section, bass player and a string quartet made up of three violins and a cello.

== Track listing ==
No.	Title	Original album	Length
1.	"Santorini"	Keys to Imagination	4:34
2.	"Song for Antarctica"	Polar Shift	4:23
3.	"Marching Season"	Chameleon Days	5:34
4.	"Walkabout"	Chameleon Days	4:32
5.	"Keys to Imagination"	Keys to Imagination	5:13
6.	"Looking Glass"	Keys to Imagination	6:35
7.	"Someday"	Niki Nana	4:34
8.	"Within Attraction"	Out of Silence	4:12
9.	"Standing in Motion"	Out of Silence	5:20
10.	"Sand Dance"	Out of Silence	5:10

== Personnel ==
- All music produced by Peter Baumann & Yanni
- All music composed by Yanni
- Mastered by Bernie Grundman at Bernie Grundman Mastering. Los Angeles, CA
- All music published by 23rd Street Publishing, Inc (ASCAP)
- Management: Jeff D. Klein
- Cover Photography by Kevin Mazur
- Inside Photography by Lynn Goldsmith

== Critical reception ==
Professional ratings
Review scores
Source	Rating
AllMusic	4.5/5 stars

In a review for AllMusic, Johnny Loftus called the album "a solid overview of the new age composer's initial work, displaying all of the tenets that have made his music so popular over the years." He concluded that "fans will have most, if not all of the material here, but newcomers might enjoy In Celebration of Life ."

== Revolution in Sound Tour ==
=== Tour dates ===
Date	City	Country	Venue
May 5, 1991	Norfolk	United States	Chrysler Hall
May 7, 1991	Easton	United States	State Theatre
May 15, 1991	Detroit	United States	Fox Theatre
May 26, 1991	Denver	United States	Paramount Theatre
May 30, 1991	San Diego	United States	Copley Symphony Hall
June 2, 1991	Berkeley	United States	Berkeley Community Theatre
June 4, 1991	San Rafael	United States	Marin Veterans' Memorial Auditorium

=== The band and concert ===
Yanni played a selection songs from his sixth Private Music albums for a two-hour completely live and showcases performance of Yanni's music, such as misty-roses pieces like "Secret Vows", "In the Mirror", "Nostalgia" and the title track of his latest release, "Reflections of Passion". Yanni and two additional keyboardist (Bradley Joseph & Amy Shiotani) are backed by a rhythm section headed by Charlie Adams on drums, with Michael Bruno on percussion and Osama Afifi on bass, and a string section featuring Charlie Bisharat and Karen Briggs on violin, and Sachi McHenry on cello.

- Charlie Adams – drums
- Osama Afifi – bass guitar
- Charlie Bisharat - violin
- Karen Briggs - violin
- Michael Bruno – percussion
- Amy Shiotani – keyboards
- Bradley Joseph – keyboards
- Sachi McHenry – cello

== Certifications ==
Region	Certification	Certified units/sales
United States (RIAA)	Gold	500,000^{^}
^{^} Shipments figures based on certification alone.
