= George Veras =

George James Veras (born October 27, 1950) was the producer of NFL Today on CBS from 1981 to 1993, and vice-president of production and broadcasting for the Cleveland Browns from 2004 to 2007. His productions have won 10 Emmy Awards. He is the former president and CEO of Pro Football Hall of Fame Enterprises, president of Veras Communications, Inc. (VCI), and adjunct professor at the Weatherhead School of Management at Case Western Reserve University.

== Life ==
Veras graduated from Shaker Heights High School in Cleveland. He went to college in 1969 at New York University where he obtained his bachelor's degree. George and his family currently live in Brecksville, Ohio

== See also ==
- Major League Baseball on CBS
- Ellis Island Medal of Honor
- Yanni Live at the Acropolis
- Yanni Live at Royal Albert Hall
- Yanni Live! The Concert Event
- Ethnicity (album)
