= Private Music (record label) =

American record label

- Founded: 1984
- Founder: Peter Baumann
- Defunct: 1996
- Status: Defunct
- Distributor: BMG
- Genre: New age, jazz, blues
- Country of origin: U.S.
- Location: New York City, Los Angeles

Private Music was an American independent record label founded in 1984 by musician Peter Baumann as a "home for instrumental music". Baumann signed Ravi Shankar, Yanni, Suzanne Ciani, Andy Summers, Patrick O'Hearn, Leo Kottke, and his former bandmates, Tangerine Dream. The label specialized in New age music but made a sharp turn to the mainstream by signing Taj Mahal, Ringo Starr, Etta James, and A. J. Croce. Its albums were distributed by BMG (the label's earliest recordings having been distributed by RCA), which bought Private Music in 1996.

== History ==
In 1989, Baumann hired veteran music executive Ron Goldstein of Warner Bros. Records as Private Music's president and CEO. Goldstein moved the offices from New York City to Los Angeles, hiring Karen Johnson to expand the label's image. Baumann recruited the well-respected, mainstream A&R executive Jamie Cohen. Visual image was important to Goldstein, who handpicked art director Melanie Penny, previously of Virgin Records and Warner Bros., as VP, Creative Services, through the life of Private Music.

Private Music emphasized its "artist re-development" efforts, supporting such eclectic veteran artists as Taj Mahal, Ringo Starr, Etta James, Jennifer Warnes, The Fabulous Thunderbirds, Toots Thielemans, Jimmy Witherspoon, Kate & Anna McGarrigle, Eliza Gilkyson, Joy Askew, The Pahinui Brothers, and Kenny Rankin, while expanding the catalogs of Yanni, Leo Kottke, Andy Summers, and Ravi Shankar, with strong "debut support" for A. J. Croce and Susan Werner. An international marketing department was added, led by longtime Sony Music executive J.P. Bommel.

Private Music's recordings earned multiple Grammy Awards and nominations, including Etta James's first career win, in 1994, for best jazz vocal performance on Mystery Lady: Songs of Billie Holiday, her debut of three albums on the label. Private's roster achieved high recognition on national television. Numerous artist appearances included interviews and performances on late-night talk shows and morning shows, MTV, and VH1.

Private's Grammy winner Taj Mahal spawned the Grammy-winning Phantom Blues Band. With its increasing influence in blues and roots music, and at the peak of its performance in record sales, Private Music entered into a joint venture with House of Blues' record label, featuring such artists as Cissy Houston and John Mooney.

In 2001, Private Music became part of the short-lived Arista Associated Labels, which also included Windham Hill Records. By 2004, after Sony and BMG merged, the label's releases switched to RCA. Following his Private Music tenure, Goldstein served as president and CEO of the Verve Music Group label at Universal Music Group, in New York City.

== Notable albums ==
Private Music has released a number of notable albums:

Album	Performer	Year of release
Optimystique	Yanni	1984
On the Future of Aviation	Jerry Goodman	1985
Theme of Secrets	Eddie Jobson	1985
A Shout Toward Noon	Leo Kottke	1986
Keys to Imagination	Yanni	1986
Tana Mana	Ravi Shankar	1987
Safety in Numbers	David Van Tieghem	1987
Out of Silence	Yanni	1987
Famous Blue Raincoat	Jennifer Warnes	1987
Optical Race	Tangerine Dream	1988
Kristen Vigard	Kristen Vigard	1988
Regards from Chuck Pink	Leo Kottke	1988
Chameleon Days	Yanni	1988
New Green Clear Blue	Dan Hartman	1989
Lily on the Beach	Tangerine Dream	1989
Miracle Mile	Tangerine Dream	1989
Strange Cargo	David Van Tieghem	1989
My Father's Face	Leo Kottke	1989
Niki Nana	Yanni	1989
Passages	Philip Glass	1990
Heartbeats Accelerating	Kate & Anna McGarrigle	1990
The Odd Get Even	Shadowfax	1990
Melrose	Tangerine Dream	1990
That's What	Leo Kottke	1990
Reflections of Passion	Yanni	1990
World Gone Strange	Andy Summers	1991
Like Never Before	Taj Mahal	1991
Great Big Boy	Leo Kottke	1991
In Celebration of Life	Yanni	1991
Time Takes Time	Ringo Starr	1992
Dare to Dream	Yanni	1992
The Hunter	Jennifer Warnes	1992
Dancing the Blues	Taj Mahal	1993
In My Time	Yanni	1993
Peculiaroso	Leo Kottke	1994
Yanni Live at the Acropolis	Yanni	1994
Getting Even with Dad	Miles Goodman	1994
Professional Dreamer	Kenny Rankin	1994
That's Me in the Bar	A. J. Croce	1995
Roll of the Dice	The Fabulous Thunderbirds	1995
Time after Time	Etta James	1995
Leo Kottke Live	Leo Kottke	1995
Sex	The Necks	1995
Last of the Good Straight Girls	Susan Werner	1995
Phantom Blues	Taj Mahal	1996
Love's Been Rough on Me	Etta James	1997
Standing in My Shoes	Leo Kottke	1997
Charmed: The Soundtrack	Various	2003

== See also ==
- Music West Records
