= Charlie Bisharat =

American violinist (born 1963)

- Born: March 15, 1963 (age 63); Inglewood, California
- Genres: New age
- Occupation: Musician
- Instrument: Violin
- Years active: 1988–present

Charlie Bisharat (born March 15, 1963) is an American violinist known as a member of Shadowfax and for his work in film and with other new age jazz artists. He has frequent collaborated partnership with composer Michael Giacchino having contributed violinist for every one of the Giacchino's films, television, and video game since Mission: Impossible III, excluding Speed Racer and Tomorrowland.

== Life and career ==
He was born in Inglewood, California, in 1963 to Palestinian parents who immigrated to the United States from Palestine in the 1950s.

Bisharat was a member of the band Shadowfax which won the Best New Age Performance Grammy Award in 1988 for the album Folksongs for a Nuclear Village. He has toured with Yanni during the Reflections of Passion, Revolution in Sound, Dare to Dream and Yanni Live, The Symphony Concerts 1993 concert tours.

He is also featured on John Tesh's live concert video Live at Red Rocks. Bisharat accompanied Tesh in live shows as co-writer and co-producer.

=== Recordings and publications ===
Bisharat's work can be heard in more than 200 recordings, including Elton John, Ayumi Hamasaki, the Rolling Stones, the Beatles, Aerosmith, Jane's Addiction, and Lady Gaga's album Chromatica. He is also in demand as a session musician on soundtracks such as Swordfish, The Mandalorian, Aquaman, Rogue One, and many Pixar films. He also featured in the music of Michael Giacchino's Ratatouille the Ride at Disneyland Paris.

Bisharat has written and recorded a jazz improvisational book and album, Beyond Classical Violi for Cherry Lane Music. In 2015, he collaborated with producer/songwriter Josquin Des Pres and composer-arranger Marti Amado on the gypsy swing album Les Nouveaux Bohemiens, featuring an ensemble that includes the likes of John Jorgenson.

== Collaborations ==
=== Composers ===
He has collaborating with fellow composer Michael Giacchino on 29 film, television, and video games session violinists since 2006, including the Mission: Impossible films, six Pixar Animation Studios films, the Star Trek reboot trilogy, the sixth and final season of the ABC series Lost, Jurassic World, and several other Giacchino's films. He has also worked with other music composers such as Hans Zimmer, John Powell, Brian Tyler, Thomas and Randy Newman, Marco Beltrami, Ludwig Göransson, Steve Jablonsky, Heitor Pereira, Lorne Balfe, Henry Jackman, Tom Holkenborg, Kris Bowers, Dominic Lewis, Matthew Margeson, Harry and Rupert Gregson-Williams, Mychael and Jeff Danna, Alan Silvestri, Danny Elfman, James Newton Howard, John Williams, John Debney, James Horner, Simon Franglen, Christophe Beck, Harald Kloser, Thomas Wander, Joseph Trapanese, Randy Edelman, Mark Mothersbaugh, Alexandre Desplat, Benjamin Wallfisch, Bear McCreary, Jeff Russo, Mark Isham, Graeme Revell, Rob Simonsen, John Murphy, Justin Hurwitz, George S. Clinton, Chanda Dancy, Pinar Toprak, and Mark Mancina.

=== Artists ===
He has collaborated with artists such as Justin Timberlake, Linkin Park, Kelly Clarkson, Bebe Rexha, Lana Del Rey, Keyshia Cole, Elton John, Lady Gaga, and among others.

=== Animation studios ===
He has collaborated with animation studios such as the 17 Pixar films, 11 Walt Disney Animation Studios films since Frozen, and 15 Illumination films.

== Discography ==
- Along the Amazon (1993), with Strunz & Farah, Don Grusin, Russell Ferrante, John Patitucci, Eric Marienthal, and Shadowfax alumni Chuck Greenberg
- Les Nouveaux Bohemiens With composer Marti Amado and composer/producer Josquin Des Pres (20th century musician)
