= Reflections of Passion =

Compilation album by Yanni
- Released: May 15, 1990
- Studio: Yanni's home (California)
- Genres: Instrumental; New age
- Length: 64:26
- Label: Private Music
- Producers: Yanni; Peter Baumann

Yanni chronology
Niki Nana (1989)	Reflections of Passion (1990)	In Celebration of Life (1991)

Singles from Reflections of Passion
- 1. "Swept Away" Released: March 1, 1991

Reflections of Passion is the first compilation album and sixth album overall by Greek keyboardist and composer Yanni, released on May 15, 1990, by Private Music. It is a selection of tracks from his five previous studio albums, released between 1980 and 1989, plus three new compositions. Yanni was encouraged to release the album by his then partner, actress Linda Evans.

Reflections of Passion became Yanni's fastest selling and most successful album of his career upon release. It reached No. 1 on the Billboard Top New Age Albums chart and No. 29 on the Billboard 200. Yanni supported the album with a nationwide concert tour in 1991 that featured his band and an orchestra. In 1995, it was certified double platinum for selling 2 million copies in the US.

== Background ==
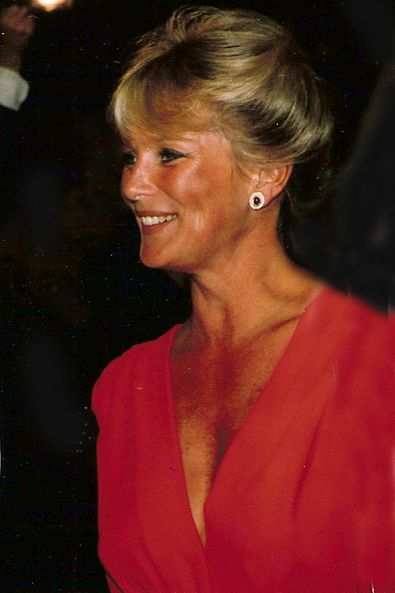
Actress Linda Evans convinced Yanni to release the album

In August 1989, Yanni released his fifth studio album, Niki Nana. The album marked his stylistic development from solo keyboard music towards rock with the addition of additional vocalists, musicians, and choir. Around the same time of its release, Yanni's newfound relationship with American actress Linda Evans, who had become a fan of his music, received press attention.

Not long into their relationship, Evans pitched an idea she had for an album from Yanni which was long in duration, reflected a single mood throughout, and something that she could play at dinner parties. She mentioned this as the pair sat by a lake in Evans's estate in Tacoma, Washington, while listening to Yanni's music on a cassette. Yanni then made a tape of Evans's favourite songs of his, which were the compositions more mellow in style, to avoid her having to switch between albums. He said that the tracks she picked were "not the best of Yanni, but the lighter side". Evans recalled: "Then my sister wanted it. Then my friends wanted it. Then my sister broke hers and wanted to borrow mine and then wrecked mine trying to tape hers".

The tape Yanni produced for Evans became the basis of Reflections of Passion. It is formed of fifteen tracks, twelve of which are from his first five studio albums, from Optimystique (1980) to Niki Nana (1989). Three tracks on the album, "Almost a Whisper", "True Nature", and "Flight of Fantasy", are new compositions. In the liner notes, Yanni wrote: "This album represents my life's passions during the past ten years. It is an expression of love for the people in my life, as well as for some very special and inspiring places I can never forget."

On May 31, 1990, Evans organised an album release party at The Beverly Hills Hotel. They anticipated for 300 people to attend, but 700 turned out for the event.

== Release ==
Reflections of Passion was released on May 15, 1990. It entered the Billboard 200 at No. 188 for the week of August 4, 1990. It re-entered the chart in late 1990 before it reached its new peak of No. 29 in January 1991. On the Billboard New Age Albums chart, the album debuted at No. 8 for the week of June 16, 1990. It climbed the chart for the next three weeks to reach No. 1 for the week of July 28. It remained at the top of the chart for 23 consecutive weeks until it was knocked off by In the Wake of the Wind by David Arkenstone, in June 1991.

Private Music organised a nine-month marketing campaign for the album, which gained further commercial momentum towards the end of 1990 following nationwide media exposure of Yanni's relationship with Evans. This included a front cover and featured article in People, an appearance on The Oprah Winfrey Show that included Yanni performing three songs live, and Into the Night with Rick Dees. During Thanksgiving week, sales rose from under 200,000 to over 400,000. Sales of Yanni's back catalogue also increased during this time. In April 1991, it was certified gold by the Recording Industry Association of America (RIAA) for selling 500,000 certified copies in the US. This figure doubled in the following six months, reaching platinum in October 1991. In September 1995, the album was certified 2× platinum for selling two million copies.

"Swept Away" was released as a single on March 1, 1991.

== Reception ==
Professional ratings
Review scores
Source	Rating
AllMusic	4.5/5 stars

In a review by Johnny Loftus of AllMusic, "The album that launched a thousand wind machines, Reflections of Passion established Yanni as the face of contemporary instrumental music. While 15 of its songs were culled from earlier releases, it was nevertheless the pianist and composer's popular breakthrough. It propelled him onto the world stage -- literally, since he performed concerts in such locales as the Taj Mahal and China's Forbidden City. The exotic places fit Yanni's sweeping compositions, which incorporated crashing percussion and fleets of surging synthesizers to approximate what a wind storm would sound like if it was made of melody. "Nostalgia", "True Nature" and "Farewell" all worked on simplistic, yet extremely powerful piano lines that ebbed and flowed with new age grace. Sure, things could get a bit too soft-focus; tracks like "First Touch" were like delicate menageries teetering on a high shelf. But Yanni's command of straightforward structure and melody helped mainstream Reflections immensely."

== Tour ==
In April 1991, Yanni began his first major concert tour across the US that featured a 10-piece band, including a string quartet, performing in 31 cities in six weeks. All the music was performed live without the use of computers or pre-recorded parts. The band included:

- Charlie Adams – drums
- Osama Afifi – bass guitar
- Charlie Bisharat – violin
- Michael Bruno – percussion
- Joyce Imbesi – keyboards
- Bradley Joseph – keyboards
- Amy Shiotani – keyboards

== Track listing ==
All music composed by Yanni.

No.	Title	Original album	Length
1.	"After the Sunrise"	Out of Silence	4:38
2.	"The Mermaid"	Out of Silence	3:47
3.	"Quiet Man"	Niki Nana	4:33
4.	"Nostalgia"	Keys to Imagination	4:29
5.	"Almost a Whisper"	New recording	3:08
6.	"The Rain Must Fall"	Chameleon Days	4:37
7.	"Acroyali"	Out of Silence	5:05
8.	"Farewell"	Optimystique	2:46
9.	"Swept Away"	Chameleon Days	5:09
10.	"True Nature"	New recording	4:35
11.	"Secret Vows"	Out of Silence	3:58
12.	"Flight of Fantasy"	New recording	5:41
13.	"A Word in Private"	Chameleon Days	3:45
14.	"First Touch"	Niki Nana	3:00
15.	"Reflections of Passion"	Chameleon Days	4:35

== Personnel ==
Credits taken from the album's liner notes.

Music

- Yanni – instruments
- Charlie Adams – acoustic and electronic drums, percussion

Production

- Yanni – production, engineer (except "Farewell")
- Jerry Steckling – engineer on "Farewell"
- Peter Baumann – production
- Chris Bellman – mastering at Bernie Grundman Mastering in Hollywood, California
- Richard Evans – album cover design
- Icon, Los Angeles and London – design and art direction
- Lynn Goldsmith – photography

== Charts ==
=== Weekly charts ===
Chart (1990)	Peak position
US Billboard 200	29

=== Year-end charts ===
Chart (1991)	Position
US Billboard 200	61

== Certifications ==
Region	Certification	Certified units/sales
Canada (Music Canada)	Platinum	100,000^{^}
United States (RIAA)	Platinum	1,000,000^{^}
^{^} Shipments figures based on certification alone.
