= Dare to Dream (Yanni album) =

Studio album by Yanni
- Released: March 17, 1992
- Genre: Instrumental
- Length: 59:05
- Label: Private Music
- Producer: Yanni

Yanni chronology
Romantic Moments (1992)	Dare to Dream (1992)	In My Time (1993)

Dare to Dream (stylised as DARE to dream) is the eighth studio album by Greek keyboardist and composer Yanni, released in March 1992 on Private Music. The album peaked at number 2 on Billboard's Top New Age Albums chart and at number 32 on the Billboard 200 chart in the same year. It went gold within two months of its release and was nominated for a Grammy.

== Background ==
Yanni says that the title of the album, Dare to Dream, "comes from the realization that, people not only don't go after their dreams but they're actually afraid to dream at all. If you're afraid to dream, nothing will ever come to you".

The album was followed by the sell-out, 65-city Dare to Dream concert tour which challenged audiences "not to be afraid to dream". On the concert tour, Yanni also advised the fans not to let their worries rob them of the joy of life, and encourages them to "dare to dream" - which is, of course, the theme of the album.

== Album ==
=== Critical reception ===
Professional ratings
Review scores
Source	Rating
AllMusic	3/5 stars

In a review by Johnny Loftus, "Dare to Dream is Yanni's first new material in three years and finds the new age composer fitting his unflinchingly romantic arrangements into tighter song structures. The surging synth backgrounds, insistent piano lines and general grandiosity that mark Yanni's sound are still intact. But tracks like "A Love for Life" or "Nice to Meet You" harness that famously epic energy in smaller stables. This tactic works especially well on the latter track, which is led by the wail of an electric fiddle. Elsewhere, Yanni plucks the heartstrings with "In the Mirror" and "So Long My Friend" – two weepy ballads that cascade like sheets of rain on a lonely city street. The seven-minute "You Only Live Once" becomes the only really epic piece on Dare to Dream, and it's pleasant enough. However, it illustrates the main drawback to Dream, which is Yanni's reliance on the shifting sands of synthesizers to do his bidding."

=== Track listing ===
No.	Title	Length
1.	"Once Upon a Time"	3:51
2.	"A Love for Life"	5:07
3.	"Nice to Meet You"	5:35
4.	"So Long My Friend"	3:47
5.	"You Only Live Once"	7:19
6.	"To the One Who Knows"	5:37
7.	"Face in the Photograph"	3:47
8.	"Felitsa"	4:45
9.	"Desire"	5:00
10.	"Aria"	3:58
11.	"A Night to Remember"	5:47
12.	"In the Mirror (first released on Romantic Moments, one month earlier)"	4:07

=== Personnel ===
- All music composed by Yanni except "Aria" [Note: "Aria" is based around a short part of the 19th century French opera, Lakmé, by Léo Delibes. Concept for "Aria" by Malcolm McLaren and Yanni.]
- Recorded at Yanni's private studios
- Mastered by Chris Bellman at Bernie Grundman Mastering, Los Angeles
- Acoustic, electronic drums and percussion by Charlie Adams
- Acoustic violin on "So Long My Friend" and "Nice to Meet You" by Charlie Bisharat
- Engineered and produced by Yanni

(Personnel as described in CD liner notes.)

== The Dare to Dream concert tour ==
=== Dates ===
April – June 1992

=== Cities ===
65 cities

=== Set list ===
Selections from Reflections of Passion, In Celebration of Life and Dare to Dream

=== The band and concert ===
- Charlie Adams – drums
- Osama Afifi – bass guitar
- Charlie Bisharat – violin
- Karen Briggs – violin
- Michael Bruno – percussion
- Julie Homi – keyboards
- Bradley Joseph – keyboards
- Sachi McHenry – cello

=== Tour production ===
- Yanni's Manager: Jeff D. Klein
- Booking Agent: Fred Bohlander, Monterey Peninsula Artists
- Tour Manager: Vincent Corry
- Prod. Mgr/Designer: David "Gurn" Kaniski
- House Sound Mixer: Tommy Sterling
- Stage Monitor Mixer: Paul Serault
- Stage Manager: Peter Feldman
- Drum/Bass Tech: Jeff Buswell
- Keyboard Tech: Peter Maher
- Vari-lite Operator: Bryan Faris
- Sound Tech: Tracy Kuntsmann
- Lighting Crew Chief: Gus Thomson
- Lighting Tech: Tod Metz
- Tour Accountant: Diane Kramer, Numbers, Inc.
- Set Construction: George & Goldberg
- Wardrobe: Lynn Bugai
- Yanni's Assistant: Susan Smela
- Tour Publicity: Dione Dirito

Special Thanks

- Yanni thanks E-mu Systems for providing the state-of-the-art sound generating equipment, including 4 Emulator IIIs, Proteus 1 and 2s, and 2 Procussion units used in the performance.

=== Tour dates ===
Date	City	Country	Venue
April 4, 1992	Charleston	United States	Gaillard Performance Hall
April 5, 1992	Atlanta	United States	Fox Theatre
April 6, 1992	Birmingham	United States	Alabama Theatre
April 8, 1992	St. Petersburg	United States	Mahaffey Theater
April 9, 1992	Fort Lauderdale	United States	Broward Center for the Performing Arts
April 10, 1992	Orlando	United States	Bob Carr Performing Arts Center
April 11, 1992	Jacksonville	United States	Florida Theatre
April 12, 1992	Pensacola	United States	Saenger Theatre
April 15, 1992	Charlotte	United States	Ovens Auditorium
April 16, 1992	Raleigh	United States	Raleigh Memorial Auditorium
April 17, 1992	Asheville	United States	Thomas Wolfe Auditorium
April 18, 1992	Knoxville	United States	Tennessee Theatre
April 21, 1992	Allentown	United States	Symphony Hall Theatre
April 22, 1992	Fairfax	United States	GMU Center for the Arts
April 23, 1992	Harrisburg	United States	Zembo Mosque
April 24, 1992	Pittsburgh	United States	Palumbo Center
April 25, 1992	Rochester	United States	Auditorium Theatre
April 26, 1992	Upper Darby	United States	Tower Theater
April 28, 1992	Hartford	United States	The Bushnell Center for the Performing Arts
April 30, 1992	Asbury Park	United States	Paramount Theatre
May 1, 1992	New York City	United States	Radio City Music Hall
May 2, 1992	Boston	United States	Orpheum Theatre
May 3, 1992	Providence	United States	Providence Performing Arts Center
May 4, 1992	Schenectady	United States	Proctor's Theatre
May 7, 1992	Columbus	United States	Palace Theatre
May 8, 1992	Noblesville	United States	Deer Creek Music Amphitheatre
May 9, 1992	Cleveland	United States	Palace Theatre
May 10, 1992	Dayton	United States	Dayton Memorial Hall
May 11, 1992	Grand Rapids	United States	DeVos Performance Hall
May 13, 1992	Toronto	United States	Massey Hall
May 15, 1992	Detroit	United States	Fox Theatre
May 16, 1992	Chicago	United States	Chicago Theatre
May 17, 1992	Chicago	United States	Chicago Theatre
May 19, 1992	Louisville	United States	Macauley's Theatre
May 20, 1992	Milwaukee	United States	Riverside Theater
May 21, 1992	Minneapolis	United States	Orpheum Theatre
May 22, 1992	Minneapolis	United States	Orpheum Theatre
May 26, 1992	Madison	United States	Oscar Mayer Theatre
May 27, 1992	Omaha	United States	Omaha Civic Auditorium
May 28, 1992	Tulsa	United States	Brady Theater
May 30, 1992	Dallas	United States	McFarlin Memorial Auditorium
May 31, 1992	Houston	United States	Jones Hall
June 3, 1992	Santa Fe	United States	Paolo Soleri Amphitheater
June 4, 1992	Denver	United States	Denver Center for the Performing Arts
June 6, 1992	Salt Lake City	United States	Symphony Hall
June 8, 1992	Tucson	United States	Tucson Community Center
June 10, 1992	Phoenix	United States	Symphony Hall
June 11, 1992	San Diego	United States	Copley Symphony Hall
June 12, 1992	Los Angeles	United States	Wiltern Theatre
June 13, 1992	Los Angeles	United States	Wiltern Theatre
June 17, 1992	San Jose	United States	Center for the Performing Arts
June 18, 1992	Santa Rosa	United States	Luther Burbank Center for the Arts
June 19, 1992	Sacramento	United States	Sacramento Theatre Company
June 20, 1992	Berkeley	United States	Berkeley Community Theatre

== Miscellaneous ==
The music "Once Upon a Time" was adopted by TVB as the background music of world weather from July 28, 1991, to December 31, 2009.

== Certifications ==
Region	Certification	Certified units/sales
Canada (Music Canada)	Platinum	100,000^{^}
United States (RIAA)	Platinum	1,000,000^{^}
^{^} Shipments figures based on certification alone.
