= If I Could Tell You =

2000 album by Yanni

Studio album by Yanni
- Released: October 3, 2000
- Studio: Yanni's home studio in Florida
- Genre: Instrumental
- Length: 62:40
- Label: Virgin
- Producer: Yanni

Yanni chronology
| Snowfall (2000) | If I Could Tell You (2000) | The Very Best of Yanni (2000) |

If I Could Tell You is the tenth studio album by Greek keyboardist and composer Yanni, released in October 2000 by Virgin Records. It peaked at #1 on Billboard's "Top New Age Albums" chart and #20 on the "Billboard 200" chart in the same year.

== Background ==
In July 1998, Yanni completed his 1997–1998 world tour, staged in support of his 1997 live album Tribute. The tour's schedule left Yanni exhausted and marked a period of decline in his life and career, stemmed by his separation from a decade-long relationship with actress Linda Evans and the depression that followed. Yanni then put his career on hold for two years, during which he avoided interviews, lived with his parents for three months in his native Greece, and travelled. Sometime in 1999, while watching the sunrise, Yanni felt he had recovered enough to resume his music career. He returned to his Florida home and started work on material for a new studio album, his first of all original songs since his 1993 album In My Time. While writing he demanded to be left alone: "I instructed everyone: 'Don't talk to me. If you see me in the morning, say good morning and let me go'."

== Critical reception ==
Professional ratings
Review scores
| Source | Rating |
|---|---|
| AllMusic | 3/5 stars |

In a review by Zac Johnson of Allmusic, Greek composer/musician Yanni has scaled back his grand musical architecture for If I Could Tell You, a sharp contrast to 1997's grandiose Tribute. The synthesized choral works seem almost sparse and frail, and the elements of world music that have been increasingly injected into his previous works are scaled back as well. Still present, however, are the straightforward melodies and overtly romantic themes that Yanni has been known (and in some cases disliked) for, but these too are less classically inspired and almost atmospheric. Unfortunately, this release may not be sweeping enough for those who fell in love with his romance novel soundtracks, and conversely it doesn't get dreamy enough to attract fans of ambient electronic musicians like Vangelis and Brian Eno. While it is somewhat surprising for Yanni to back away from the richly orchestrated works on Tribute and 1993's In My Time, the move shows a real sense of direction and growth that few give him credit for.

== Track listing ==
All music composed and arranged by Yanni.

| No. | Title | Length |
|---|---|---|
| 1. | "On Sacred Ground" | 7:08 |
| 2. | "The Flame Within" | 5:53 |
| 3. | "Midnight Hymn" | 5:49 |
| 4. | "November Sky" | 4:43 |
| 5. | "With an Orchid" | 5:05 |
| 6. | "Wishing Well" | 5:43 |
| 7. | "A Walk in the Rain" | 4:55 |
| 8. | "Highland" | 5:53 |
| 9. | "If I Could Tell You" | 5:51 |
| 10. | "In Your Eyes" | 5:09 |
| 11. | "Reason for Rainbows" | 6:01 |

== Personnel ==
Adapted from the album's liner notes.

Music

- Yanni – all instruments, including a Yamaha CF III S 9' concert grand piano and Yamaha DC7 E3-Pro Disklavier grand piano

Production

- Yanni – production, engineering, mixing
- Anthony Stabile – assistant engineer
- Chris Bellman – mastering at Bernie Grundman Mastering in Hollywood, California

== Charts ==
=== Weekly charts ===
Weekly chart performance for "If I Could Tell You"
| Chart (2000) | Peak position |
|---|---|
| US New Age Album (Billboard) | 1 |
| US Billboard 200 | 20 |
| US Top Album Sales (Billboard) | 20 |
| US Top Current Album Sales (Billboard) | 20 |

== Certifications ==
| Region | Certification | Certified units/sales |
|---|---|---|
| United States (RIAA) | Gold | 500,000^{^} |
^{^} Shipments figures based on certification alone.
