= Mozart effect =

Psychological effects of listening to Mozart's music

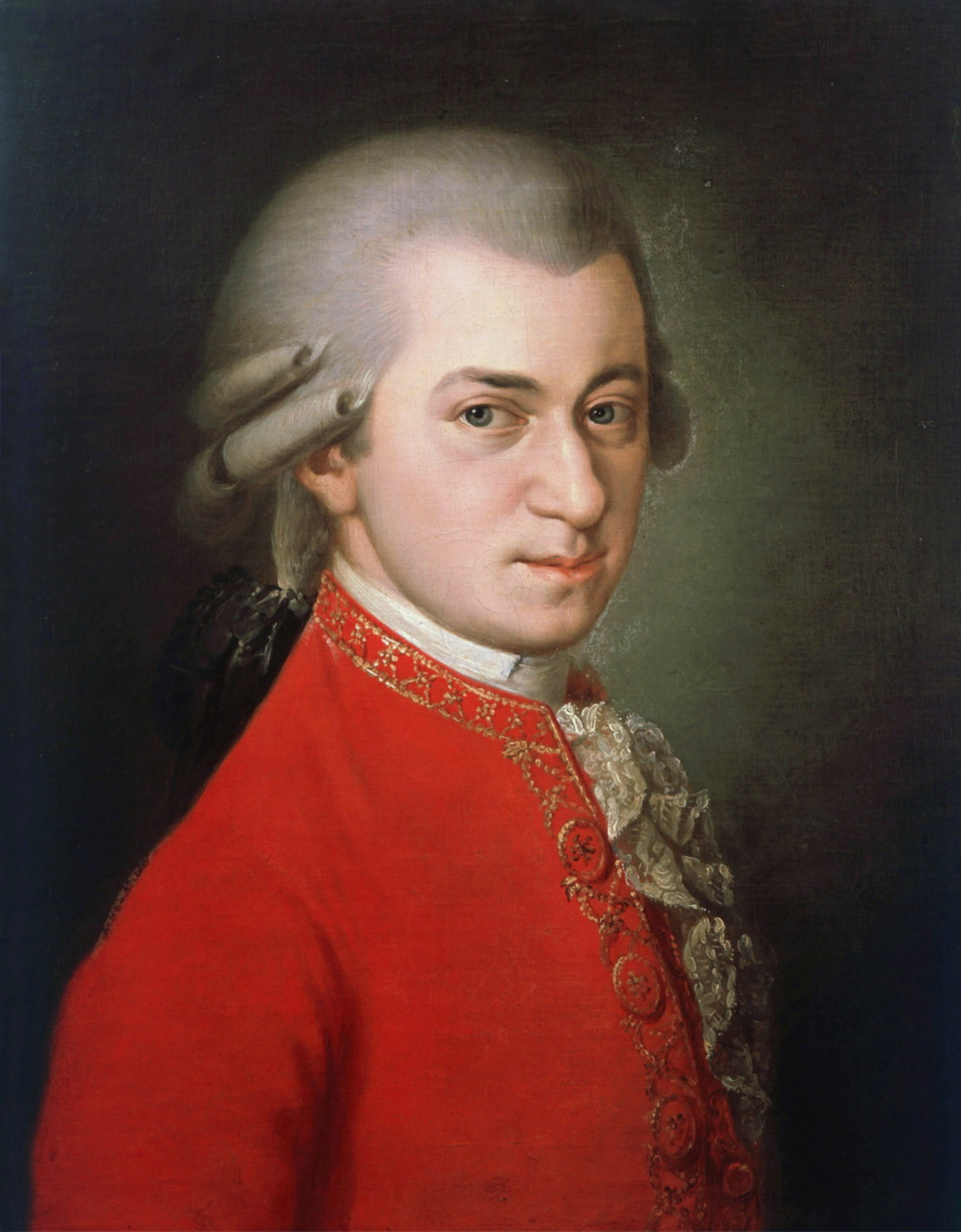
Krafft's posthumous 1819 Mozart portrait

The Mozart effect is the hypothesis that listening to the music of Wolfgang Amadeus Mozart may temporarily boost scores on one portion of an IQ test. Popular science versions of the hypothesis make the claim that "listening to Mozart makes you smarter" or that early childhood exposure to classical music has a beneficial effect on mental development.

The original study from 1993 reported a short-term (lasting about 15 minutes) improvement on the performance of certain kinds of mental tasks known as spatial reasoning, such as folding paper and solving mazes. The results were highly exaggerated by the popular press and became "Mozart makes you smart", which was said to apply to children in particular (the original study included 36 college students). These claims led to a commercial fad with Mozart CDs being sold to parents. The U.S. state of Georgia even proposed a budget to provide every child with a CD of classical music. Around this time, the Baby Einstein franchise was being started and the second video in the series, Baby Mozart, was made with the Mozart Effect in mind.

A meta-analysis of studies that have replicated the original study shows that there is little evidence that listening to Mozart has any particular effect on spatial reasoning. The author of the original study has stressed that listening to Mozart has no effect on general intelligence.

== Rauscher et al. 1993 study ==
Frances Rauscher, Gordon Shaw, and Catherine Ky (1993) investigated the effect of listening to music by Mozart on spatial reasoning, and the results were published in Nature. They gave research participants one of three standard tests of abstract spatial reasoning after they had experienced each of three listening conditions: the Sonata for Two Pianos in D major, K. 448 by Mozart, verbal relaxation instructions, and silence. They found a temporary enhancement of spatial-reasoning, as measured by spatial-reasoning sub tasks of the Stanford-Binet IQ test. Rauscher et al. show that the enhancing effect of the music condition is only temporary: no student had effects extending beyond the 15-minute period in which they were tested. The study makes no statement of an increase in IQ in general (because IQ was never measured).

== Popularization ==
While Rauscher et al. only showed an increase in "spatial intelligence", the results were popularly interpreted as an increase in general IQ. A general Mozart effect was thus widely reported. In 1994, New York Times music columnist Alex Ross wrote in a light-hearted article, "researchers [Rauscher and Shaw] have determined that listening to Mozart actually makes you smarter". A 1997 Boston Globe article mentioned some of the Rauscher and Shaw results. It described one study in which three- and four-year-olds who were given eight months of private piano lessons scored 30% higher on tests of spatio-temporal reasoning than control groups given computer lessons, singing lessons, and no training.

The 1997 book by Don Campbell, The Mozart Effect: Tapping the Power of Music to Heal the Body, Strengthen the Mind, and Unlock the Creative Spirit, discusses the theory that listening to Mozart (especially the piano concertos) may temporarily increase one's IQ and produce many other beneficial effects on mental function. Campbell recommends playing specially selected classical music to infants, in the expectation that it will benefit their mental development.

After The Mozart Effect, Campbell wrote a follow-up book, The Mozart Effect For Children, and created related products. Among these are collections of music that he states harness the Mozart effect to enhance "deep rest and rejuvenation", "intelligence and learning", and "creativity and imagination". Campbell defines the term as "an inclusive term signifying the transformational powers of music in health, education, and well-being. It represents the general use of music to reduce stress, depression, or anxiety; induce relaxation or sleep; activate the body; and improve memory or awareness. Innovative and experimental uses of music and sound can improve listening disorders, dyslexia, attention deficit disorder, autism, and other mental and physical disorders and diseases".

These theories are controversial. The relationship of sound and music (both played and listened to) for cognitive function and various physiological metrics has been explored in studies with no definitive results.

== Political impact ==
The political impact of the theory was demonstrated on January 13, 1998, when Zell Miller, governor of Georgia, announced that his proposed state budget would include $105,000 a year to provide every child born in Georgia with a tape or CD of classical music. Miller stated "No one questions that listening to music at a very early age affects the spatial-temporal reasoning that underlies math and engineering and even chess." Miller played legislators some of Beethoven's "Ode to Joy" on a tape recorder and asked "Now, don't you feel smarter already?" Miller asked Yoel Levi, music director of the Atlanta Symphony, to compile a collection of classical pieces that should be included. State representative Homer DeLoach said "I asked about the possibility of including some Charlie Daniels or something like that, but they said they thought the classical music has a greater positive impact. Having never studied those impacts too much, I guess I'll just have to take their word for that."

== Subsequent research and meta-analyses ==
While some supportive reports have been published, studies with positive results have tended to be associated with any form of music that has energetic and positive emotional qualities. Moreover, the intellectual benefits of enhanced mood and arousal are not restricted to spatial-temporal reasoning, but extend to speed of processing and creative problem solving. Among children, some studies suggest no effect on IQ or spatial ability, whereas others suggest that the effect can be elicited with energetic popular music that the children enjoy. The weight of subsequent evidence supports either a null effect, or short-term effects related to increases in mood and arousal, with mixed results published after the initial report in Nature.

In 1999 a major challenge was raised to the existence of the Mozart effect by two teams of researchers. In a pair of papers published together under the title "Prelude or Requiem for the 'Mozart Effect'?" Chabris reported a meta-analysis demonstrating that "any cognitive enhancement is small and does not reflect any change in IQ or reasoning ability in general, but instead derives entirely from performance on one specific type of cognitive task and has a simple neuropsychological explanation", called "enjoyment arousal". For example, he cites a study that found that "listening either to Mozart or to a passage from a Stephen King story enhanced subjects' performance in paper folding and cutting (one of the tests frequently employed by Rauscher and Shaw) but only for those who enjoyed what they heard". Steele et al. found that "listening to Mozart produced a 3-point increase relative to silence in one experiment and a 4-point decrease in the other experiment". In another study, the effect was replicated with the original Mozart music, but eliminated when the tempo was slowed down and major chords were replaced by minor chords.

Another meta-analysis by Pietschnig, Voracek, and Formann (2010) combined results of 39 studies to answer the question as to whether or not the Mozart Effect exists. They concluded that there is little evidence to support the Mozart effect, as shown by small effect sizes. However, the most striking finding in this meta-analysis is the significantly larger effects published in studies affiliated with Rauscher or Rideout, with effect sizes more than three times higher for published studies affiliated with these founding members of the Mozart Effect. These systematic moderating effects due to lab affiliation call into question the existence of a Mozart Effect. In addition, this study also found strong evidence supporting a confounding publication bias when effect sizes of samples who listened to Mozart are compared to samples not exposed to a stimulus.

Despite implementing Rauscher, Shaw, and Ky's (1995) suggestions of three key components that must be present to replicate the Mozart Effect, McCutcheon (2000) still failed to reproduce the Mozart Effect in a study with 36 adults. These conditions were: to ensure a task that taps into spatial components of mental imagery; a research design that does not include a pretest to avoid ceiling effects; a musical composition that is complex rather than repetitive and simple. Regardless of listening to classical music, jazz or silence, the study did not yield a significant effect on spatial reasoning performance.

The Mozart Effect is likely just an artifact of arousal and heightened mood. Arousal is the confounding variable that mediates the relationship between spatial ability and music that defines the Mozart Effect. The "neural resonance" theory of Rauscher and colleagues which contends that Mozart's music primes the neural pathways of spatial reasoning has been widely criticized.

Government bodies also became involved in analysing the wealth (some 300+ articles as of 2005) of reports. A German report concluded, for instance, that "... passively listening to Mozart — or indeed any other music you enjoy — does not make you smarter. But more studies should be done to find out whether music lessons could raise your child's IQ in the long term".

Popular presentations of the "Mozart effect", including Alex Ross's comment that "listening to Mozart actually makes you smarter" and Zell Miller's "don't you feel smarter" query to the Georgia legislature, almost always tie it to "intelligence." Rauscher, one of the original researchers, has disclaimed this idea. In a 1999 reply to an article challenging the effect, published along with the article, she wrote (emphasis added):

Our results on the effects of listening to Mozart's Sonata for Two Pianos in D Major K. 448 on spatial–temporal task performance have generated much interest but several misconceptions, many of which are reflected in attempts to replicate the research. The comments by Chabris and Steele et al. echo the most common of these: that listening to Mozart enhances intelligence. We made no such claim. The effect is limited to spatial–temporal tasks involving mental imagery and temporal ordering.

On efforts like Miller's budget proposal, and the press attention surrounding the effect, Rauscher has said, "I don't think it can hurt. I'm all for exposing children to wonderful cultural experiences. But I do think the money could be better spent on music education programs."

Many scholars in the psychological community now view the claim that playing classical music to children can boost their intelligence to be a "myth." Emory University psychologist Scott Lilienfeld ranks Mozart Effect as number six in his book 50 Great Myths of Popular Psychology.

=== Health benefits ===
Music has been evaluated to see if it has other properties. The April 2001 edition of Journal of the Royal Society of Medicine assessed the possible health benefits of the music of Mozart. John Jenkins played Sonata K.448 to patients with epilepsy and found a decrease in epileptiform activity. According to the British Epilepsy Organization, research has suggested that apart from Mozart's K.448 and Piano Concerto No. 23 (K. 488), only one other piece of music has been found to have a similar effect; a song by the Greek composer Yanni, entitled "Acroyali/Standing in Motion" (version from Yanni Live at the Acropolis performed at the Acropolis). It was determined to have the "Mozart effect", by the Journal of the Royal Society of Medicine because it was similar to Mozart's K.448 in tempo, structure, melodic and harmonic consonance and predictability.

In 2023, Sandra Oberleiter and Jakob Pietschnig showed in Scientific Reports that the existing evidence on the Mozart Effect in epilepsy is not scientifically robust. In an extensive meta-analysis, it was argued that positive findings regarding symptom relief are based on inadequate research designs, selective reporting, and too small sample sizes. Additionally, results cannot be replicated because study data is not available and therefore does not comply with modern research standards.

== Other uses of Mozart's music ==
While it is clear that exposure to Mozart does not raise IQ, studies of the effects of music have explored as diverse areas as its links to seizure onset or research in animals suggesting that even exposure in-utero in rats improves their maze learning. The original claim continues to influence public life. For instance a German sewage treatment plant plays Mozart music to break down the waste faster, reports the UK Guardian. Anton Stucki, chief operator of the Treuenbrietzen plant was quoted as saying, "We think the secret is in the vibrations of the music, which penetrate everything—including the water, the sewage and the cells."

== Alfred Tomatis ==
The term "Mozart effect" was used by the French researcher Alfred Tomatis in his 1991 book Pourquoi Mozart? (Why Mozart?) where he used the music of Mozart in his efforts to "retrain" the ear, and believed that listening to the music presented at differing frequencies helped the ear, and promoted healing and the development of the brain, but his method is not directly related to claims that listening to Mozart increases intelligence.

== See also ==
- Baby Einstein
- Genius Products
- Music education § Significance
- Psychoacoustics
- Mozart myths
