= Live at the Acropolis =

1994 Yanni album and film

Live album and concert film by Yanni
- Released: March 1, 1994
- Recorded: September 25, 1993
- Venues: Herodes Atticus Theatre, Athens, Greece
- Genres: Contemporary instrumental; new age
- Length: 69:16
- Label: Private Music
- Producer: Yanni

Yanni chronology
In My Time (1993)	Live at the Acropolis (1994)	A Collection of Romantic Themes (1994)

Alternative cover
- 25th Anniversary Edition

Live at the Acropolis is the first live album and concert film by the Greek keyboardist, composer, and producer Yanni, released on March 1, 1994, on Private Music. It was recorded at the Herodes Atticus Theatre in Athens, Greece during his 1993 tour in support of his eighth studio album, In My Time (1993). The concert took a year and a half to organise and cost Yanni $2 million of his own money to fund. He performs with his six-piece band and the Royal Philharmonic Orchestra conducted by Shahrdad Rohani. The album was mixed and produced by Yanni in his studio, and was made into a television special which aired in the United States on Public Broadcasting Service (PBS).

Live at the Acropolis received a mostly positive reception from music critics. It was an instant commercial success, reaching number one on the Billboard New Age Albums chart and number 5 on the Billboard 200. It remains Yanni's highest selling release with 4 million albums and 600,000 home videos sold in the United States, and an estimated 7 million copies sold worldwide. In 1994, the video received a Primetime Emmy Award nomination for Outstanding Individual Achievement in Lighting Direction (Electronic) for a Drama Series, Variety Series, Miniseries or a Special. A remastered edition with bonus material to commemorate the album's 25th anniversary was released in November 2018.

== Background and recording ==
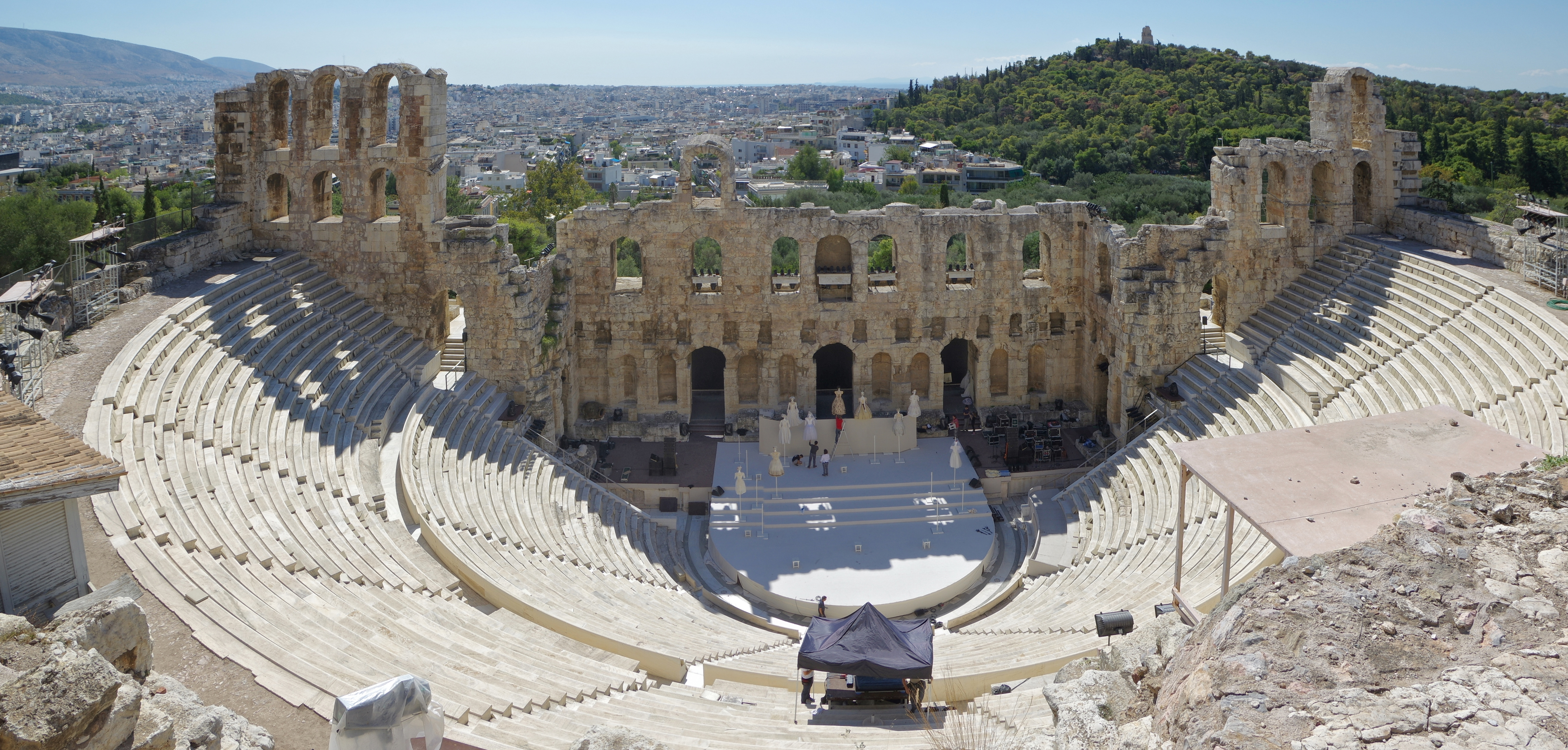
The Herodes Atticus Theatre in Athens where Yanni recorded Live at the Acropolis

In April 1993, Yanni released his eighth studio album, In My Time, on the Private Music label. He supported the album with a concert tour that visited 40 cities worldwide which included three sell out performances at the Herodes Atticus Theatre by the Acropolis in Athens, Greece, his first to take place in his native country. After he moved to the United States in 1972, returning to Greece to perform at the Acropolis became one of his career goals. The event took over a year and a half to organise, and recalled his experience of meeting with the local archaeological committee, the mayor, and ministers of culture and tourism as his effort to gain their trust and permission to perform, promising not to cause any damage. For the occasion, Yanni wanted to record and film the concerts for a live album and home video. Without sufficient financial backing, Yanni risked $2 million of his own money on its production in a strategy to boost his artistic profile and open new markets for his music. Despite being advised by his management and Private Music personnel not to proceed with the concert due to the high costs, Yanni proceeded regardless and by the end of it, was left with an estimated $50,000 to his name.

Live at the Acropolis documents the last of the three nights which took place on 25 September 1993. The concert included a line-up of his six-piece band, formed of drummer Charlie Adams, violinist Karen Briggs, percussionist Michael "Kalani" Bruno, bassist Ric Fierabracci, and Julie Homi and Bradley Joseph on additional keyboards, and the Royal Philharmonic Orchestra conducted by Shahrdad Rohani. Adams picked out the Acropolis concerts as the most exciting of his association with Yanni. The fact that it was Yanni's first shows in his home country made it particularly special for Adams; "it made you feel warm in the heart for him". Performing his drum solo during the set was another highlight for Adams as he felt he could communicate for those in the audience who did not speak English. Similarly, Joseph picked the Acropolis shows as one of the high points of working with Yanni, citing the gathering of different languages and cultures for the concerts. He recalled the police searching the concert site and dressing rooms with dogs for signs of explosives. From this appearance and others with Yanni, Briggs gained the title "The Lady in Red".

== Release ==
Live at the Acropolis was released on March 1, 1994. The album peaked at number one on the Billboard Top New Age Albums chart and number 5 on the Billboard 200 chart. In September 1994, the album was certified triple platinum by the Recording Industry Association of America (RIAA) for three million copies sold in the United States. In April 1998, it was certified quadruple platinum, signifying four million copies sold. In the same month, the video release had reached quadruple platinum for sales in excess of 600,000 copies.

The concert aired on United States television on March 1, 1994, to an estimated 130 stations nationwide on Public Broadcasting Service (PBS). It became one of the network's highest fund raisers through pledges from viewers in its modern history, with other television stations adding the concert to their schedules after witnessing the success from stations that did air it. The video spent 229 weeks on Billboard's Top Music Video and Top VHS Sales charts, In a three-year television deal with the Public Broadcasting Service (PBS), the live television special was one of the top fund-raising subjects for PBS, raising $13 million, with more than 750,000 home videos and more than 7 million albums sold worldwide. It has been seen in 65 countries by half a billion people, and is the second best selling music video of all time behind Michael Jackson's Thriller. To capitalise on the success, Yanni began a 61-date concert tour in May 1994. The process of gaining permission to perform by the Acropolis contributed to the staging of his next two concerts at historical sites, the Taj Mahal in Agra, India and the Forbidden City in Beijing, China, in 1997.

"Acroyali/Standing in Motion" was determined to have the Mozart Effect by the Journal of the Royal Society of Medicine because it was similar to Sonata for Two Pianos in D major by Mozart, K 448 in tempo, structure, melodic and harmonic consonance and predictability. His live recording of "Standing in Motion" was used as a pregame song for the New Jersey Devils for years.

The corresponding concert tour of the year was Yanni Live, The Symphony Concerts 1994.

== Critical reception ==
Professional ratings
Review scores
Source	Rating
AllMusic	4.5/5 stars
Robert Christgau	D+

Reviewing for AllMusic, Jonathan Widran writes, "It's no surprise that Yanni is most identified with this amazingly powerful experience (also presented as one of PBS's most popular concerts ever), because it seems like the musical project he was most destined to make. After making millions stateside, he returns to the historic ancient Acropolis of his Greek homeland to share his sweeping music with his countrymen. One of the most impressive aspects of Yanni in this live setting is the way his beautiful piano passages blend with the occasional boom of the Royal Philharmonic Orchestra (conducted by Shardad Rohani)." A negative review came from the Village Voice's Robert Christgau, who called the album "affluent spirituality cum cornball romanticism from a florid New Age keyb [sic] maestro."

== Track listing ==
All music was composed and produced by Yanni except "Aria", based on The Flower Duet from the Léo Delibes opera Lakmé.

No.	Title	Length
1.	"Santorini"	6:57
2.	"Keys to Imagination"	7:33
3.	"Until the Last Moment"	6:37
4.	"The Rain Must Fall"	7:24
5.	"Acroyali/Standing in Motion (Medley)"	8:51
6.	"One Man's Dream"	3:36
7.	"Within Attraction"	7:46
8.	"Nostalgia"	5:46
9.	"Swept Away"	9:22
10.	"Reflections of Passion"	5:22
11.	"Aria" (bonus track)	4:04

=== 2018 25th Anniversary edition ===
No.	Title	Length
1.	"Santorini"	6:57
2.	"Keys to Imagination"	7:31
3.	"Felitsa" (bonus track)	5:03
4.	"The Rain Must Fall"	7:50
5.	"Until the Last Moment"	6:45
6.	"Acroyali"	2:01
7.	"Standing in Motion"	6:30
8.	"One Man's Dream"	3:33
9.	"Within Attraction"	7:42
10.	"Nostalgia"	5:48
11.	"The End of August" (bonus track)	3:51
12.	"Swept Away" (edit)	6:54
13.	"Reflections of Passion"	4:51
14.	"Aria" (bonus track)	4:39

== Video ==
The film of Live at the Acropolis was released on home video on March 1, 1994, the same day as the album. It was originally broadcast in the United States by Public Broadcasting Service (PBS) and was one of the top fundraising programs for the network.

In 1994, the video received a Primetime Emmy Award nomination for Outstanding Individual Achievement in Lighting Direction (Electronic) for a Drama Series, Variety Series, Miniseries or a Special, specifically crediting lighting designer Lee Rose, and lighting director and designers Richard Ocean and David "Gurn" Kaniski.

Katie Tamms of AllMovie writes, "Before a sold-out crowd on September 24, 1993, new age musical artist Yanni, accompanied by the Royal Philharmonic Orchestra, performed the first of three historic concerts at the Acropolis in Athens, Greece. Himself a native of Kalamata, Greece, Yanni had returned to perform in his homeland after more than 20 years in America. This video production, headed by award-winning director George Veras, includes a behind-the-scenes look at the creation of the live video, as well as backstage interviews with Yanni and some of his musical entourage." The video was released on DVD in 1999 by Windham Hill.

The video was released again in CD/DVD and Blu-Ray package in 2018 as the 25th anniversary of the concert and has been digitally restored and the music has been digitally re-mastered and remixed by Yanni for full 5.1 surround sound. This special limited edition package also includes a brand new interview with Yanni a look back on Live at the Acropolis 25 years later, three bonus tracks and a 60-page booklet with never-before-seen photos from the making of Live at the Acropolis.

=== Track listing ===
Original VHS/DVD edition
No.	Title	Length
1.	"Santorini"
2.	"Keys to Imagination"
3.	"Until the Last Moment"
4.	"The Rain Must Fall"
5.	"One Man's Dream"
6.	"Within Attraction"
7.	"Felitsa"
8.	"Marching Season"
9.	"Nostalgia"
10.	"Acroyali/Standing in Motion (Medley)"
11.	"Aria"
12.	"Swept Away"
13.	"Reflections of Passion"
14.	"The End of August"

25th Anniversary Edition
No.	Title	Length
1.	"Santorini"
2.	"Until the Last Moment"
3.	"Keys to Imagination"
4.	"The Rain Must Fall"
5.	"Felitsa"
6.	"Within Attraction"
7.	"One Man's Dream"
8.	"Marching Season"
9.	"Nostalgia"
10.	"Acroyali/Standing in Motion"
11.	"Aria"
12.	"Reflections of Passion"
13.	"Swept Away"
14.	"The End of August"
Total length:		1:35:34

1999 DVD bonus features:

- Words From Yanni
- Yanni Backstage

25th Anniversary Edition new bonus features:

- In Discussion with Yanni
  - About the Origin of Live at the Acropolis
  - Looking Back on Live at the Acropolis 25 Years Later
  - Insight Into His Set List Creation
  - How His Music Relates to Today
  - About His Musicians and the Creative Process
  - The Accolades Surrounding Live at the Acropolis
  - The Influence of His Music on Our Culture and His Favorite Moments

== Personnel ==
Credits are adapted from the album's liner notes.

Music

- Yanni – piano, keyboards
- Charlie Adams – drums
- Karen Briggs – violin
- Michael "Kalani" Bruno – percussion
- Ric Fierabracci – bass guitar
- Julie Homi – additional keyboards
- Bradley Joseph – additional keyboards
- Shahrdad Rohani – conductor, violin duet on "Within Attraction"
- Darlene Koldenhoven – vocals on "Aria"
- Lynn Davis – vocals on "Aria"
- Royal Philharmonic Concert Orchestra

Production

- Yanni – engineering and mixing at his private studios, production
- Andy Rose – recording
- Chris Bellman – mastering in Los Angeles
- Bernie Grundman – mastering in Los Angeles
- Shahrdad Rohani – orchestrations, transcriptions, arrangement preparation
- Jeffrey Silverman – orchestrations
- John Rinehimer – orchestrations
- Richard Boukas – transcriptions, arrangement preparation
- Tom Sterling - live audio engineer
- Curtis Kelly - live monitor engineer
- Norman Moore – art direction, design
- Lynn Goldsmith – photography

== Charts ==
=== Weekly charts ===
Chart (1994–1995)	Peak position
Australian Albums (ARIA)	2
Dutch Albums (Album Top 100)	80
New Zealand Albums (RMNZ)	6
Swedish Albums (Sverigetopplistan)	46
UK Albums (Official Charts)	91
US Billboard 200	5
US New Age Albums (Billboard)	1

=== Year-end charts ===
Chart (1994)	Position
US Billboard 200	38
Chart (1995)	Position
US Billboard 200	54

== Certifications ==
Region	Certification	Certified units/sales
Australia (ARIA)	Gold	35,000^{^}
Brazil (Pro-Música Brasil) video	Platinum	50,000^{*}
Brazil (Pro-Música Brasil)	Gold	100,000^{*}
Canada (Music Canada) video	3× Platinum	30,000^{^}
Canada (Music Canada)	2× Platinum	200,000^{^}
Malaysia	—	13,000
Mexico (AMPROFON) video	3× Gold	30,000^{^}
New Zealand (RMNZ)	Gold	7,500^{^}
Singapore (RIAS)	Platinum	15,000^{*}
United States (RIAA) video	6× Platinum	600,000^{^}
United States (RIAA)	4× Platinum	4,000,000^{^}
Summaries
Worldwide	—	7,000,000
^{*} Sales figures based on certification alone.^{^} Shipments figures based on certification alone.
