= Shahrdad Rohani =

Iranian-American composer and conductor

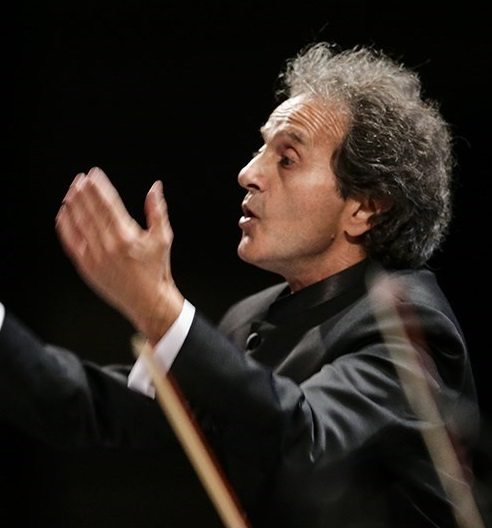

Background information
- Also known as: Shardad Rohani
- Born: 27 May 1954 (age 71); Tehran, Iran
- Origin: Iran; Wiener Musikakademie
- Occupations: Composer, Conductor, Musician
- Instruments: Violin, piano
- Years active: 1973–present
- Website: www.instagram.com/shahrdadrohani/

Shahrdad Rohani, also known as Shardad Rohani (Persian: شهرداد روحانی; born 27 May 1954), is an Iranian-American composer, violinist/pianist, and conductor. His style is contemporary and he is well known for composing and conducting classical, instrumental, adult contemporary/new age, film soundtrack as well as pop music. He was the principal conductor and music director of the Tehran Symphony Orchestra from 2016 to 2020.

== Early life ==
He was born in 1954 in Tehran, Iran. His father, Reza Rohani, was an accomplished musician and as a result, Shahrdad and all of his brothers including Anoushiravan Rohani and Ardeshir Rohani followed in their father's footsteps. He began playing the piano at age 6, like many of his other brothers. As a child, he was a student to a well-known Persian violinist, Ebrahim Rouhifar. At age 10 he attended the Persian National Music Conservatory of Tehran. By 1975, he was studying Composition and Orchestra Conducting at the University of Music and Performing Arts Vienna. In 1984, Rohani moved to Los Angeles.

== Musical career ==
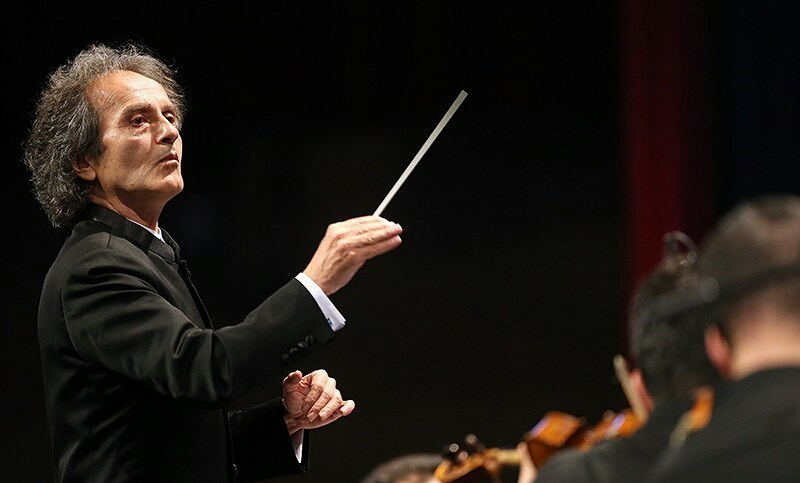
Shahrdad Rouhani, 2016

From 1987 until 1991, Rohani served as the music director and conductor of the Committee on the Arts (COTA) symphony orchestra in Los Angeles. He has appeared as a guest conductor with several prestigious orchestras, including London's Royal Philharmonic Orchestra, Minnesota Orchestra, Colorado Symphony Orchestra, San Diego Symphony, Indianapolis Symphony Orchestra, New Jersey Symphony, Zagreb Philharmonic Orchestra, the American Youth Philharmonic Orchestras and many others.

Rohani arranged and conducted a sixty-piece orchestra to supplement Yanni's keyboard compositions during the Yanni Live at the Acropolis concert in 1993 – an open-air concert with the London Royal Philharmonic Concert Orchestra on the Acropolis, Athens, Greece. Yanni Live at the Acropolis was acclaimed by both critics and audiences and became the most widely viewed program ever shown on Public Television in the United States and is the second best-selling music video of all time.

In 1994, he became a US citizen.

Rohani was commissioned in 1998 by the government of Thailand and the committee of the 13th Asian Games to compose and conduct the music for opening ceremonies. The composition became the most popular song of the Asian Games.

== Discography ==
=== Solo albums ===
Year	Title	Notes
1977	Eternity	
1994	Beauty of Love, Journey to Romance	
1988	Dream Images	
1990	Rayahee	
1991	Dance of Spring	
1994	The Winds of Christmas	
1994	Encore in Ivory	
1995	Impressions of Romance	
1996	Touch of Serenity, Volume 1	
1997	The Winds of Christmas, Volume 2	
1998	Cinema Passion	
2014	Persian Gulf Symphonic Suite	

=== Compilation and guest artist albums ===
Year	Title	Artist(s)	Notes
1994	Live at the Acropolis	Yanni	The Royal Philharmonic Orchestra was conducted by Shahrdad Rohani on this album
1999	The Private Years	Yanni	Box set
2000	River of Kings	Dej Bulsuk, London Symphony Orchestra, Shardad Rohani	
2000	Sunrise in Bangkok	Dej Bulsuk, London Symphony Orchestra, Shardad Rohani	
2002	Kingdom of Smiles	Dej Bulsuk, London Symphony Orchestra, Shardad Rohani	
2007	Tchaikovsky: The Nutcracker; Swan Lake; the Sleeping Beauty	Slovak Radio New Philharmonic Orchestra, Viktor Simcisko, Shardad Rohani	
2009	EclectSax	Douglas Masek, Shardad Rohani	
2009	Open Secret	Nahan Makon, Alireza Assar, London Symphonic Orchestra, Shardad Rohani	
2013	Dancing at the Opera	Various artists	
2013	Sinus Persicus Suite	London Symphony Orchestra, London Voices, Shardad Rohani	
2013	Born to be Thai	Dej Bulsuk, Slovak Radio Symphony Orchestra, Shardad Rohani	

== Awards ==
- A.K.M. Scholarship (Vienna, Austria)
- ASCAP Scholarship (Los Angeles, California)
- 1984 – Jerry Fielding Award, UCLA
- 1999 – 'Pikanes Award' by the Musical Association of Thailand

== See also ==
- List of Iranian musicians
- Music of Iran
- Persian pop music
