= In My Time =

Studio album by Yanni
- Released: April 6, 1993
- Genre: Instrumental
- Length: 49:10
- Label: Private Music
- Producer: Yanni

Yanni chronology
Dare to Dream (1992)	In My Time (1993)	Live at the Acropolis (1994)

In My Time is the ninth studio album by Greek keyboardist and composer Yanni, released on the Private Music label in 1993. This album is a gentler collection of piano-focused pieces. The album attained Platinum status and was the second Grammy nomination for Yanni. It reached number one on Billboard's Top New Age Albums chart and peaked at number 24 on the Billboard 200 chart in the same year.

The corresponding concert tour for the year was Yanni Live, The Symphony Concerts 1993.

"This was the kind of album I've been wanting to make for years," Yanni says, "a clear and honest album that would be consistent in its mood. I wanted the audience to feel the human being behind the music. One human being to another. For that reason, I intentionally kept the background instrumentation and production at a minimum."

== Critical reception ==
Professional ratings
Review scores
Source	Rating
AllMusic	3/5 stars

In a review by Backroads Music/Heartbeats, "Yanni's latest is another extension of his creative spirit and stirring passion for life. Focusing on piano as his primary instrument, Yanni infuses his "signature" style with timeless, eloquent themes and plenty of romantic energy. No longer are rhythm and dynamic currents as vital to his sound, since he seems to have stopped fueling his music with 'rocket power'. His romantic outpourings lend a personal nature to In My Time, and this new effort should be received with enthusiasm far and wide. Yanni is uniquely expressive, and this new music is deeply touching on many levels."

== Track listing ==
No.	Title	Length
1.	"In the Morning Light"	3:49
2.	"One Man's Dream"	2:43
3.	"Before I Go"	4:30
4.	"Enchantment"	3:51
5.	"The End of August"	4:51
6.	"To Take... To Hold"	4:01
7.	"In the Mirror"	4:04
8.	"Felitsa"	4:51
9.	"Whispers in the Dark"	5:24
10.	"Only a Memory"	4:15
11.	"Until the Last Moment"	6:22

All tracks are new to this album with the exception of "In the Mirror" and "Felitsa", both of which can be found on the previous album, "Dare to Dream" (1992).

== Personnel ==
- All music composed and produced by Yanni
- Endre Granat – violin on "The End of August" and "Felitsa".

== Production ==
- Recorded at Yanni's private studios
- Engineered by Yanni
- Mastered by Chris Bellman at Bernie Grundman Mastering, Los Angeles
- Art Direction & Design: Norman Moore
- Photography: Lynn Goldsmith

== Yanni Live, The Symphony Concerts 1993 ==
=== Dates ===
June - September 1993

=== Cities ===
30 cities

=== Set list ===
- "Santorini"
- "Until the Last Moment"
- "Keys to Imagination"
- "In the Mirror"
- "The Rain Must Fall"
- "Felitsa"
- "Within Attraction"
- "One Man's Dream"
- "Marching Season"
- "Nostalgia"
- "Acroyali/Standing in Motion (Medley)"
- "Aria"
- "Reflections of Passion"
- "Swept Away"
- "Secret Vows"
- "The End of August"

=== The band ===
Yanni's music follows through on that premise. A typical composition has the sound and form of an instrumental theme for a televised sports event, soap opera or newscast divested of melody and padded out to four or five minutes. Playing a battery of electronic instruments, he and the two other keyboardists in his band (Julie Homi and Bradley Joseph) insert motifs that evoke the hoariest Hollywood cliches of Middle Eastern, Far Eastern and other regional styles. The largely shapeless pieces huff and puff with a galloping energy that suggests an action-movie soundtrack. Although there are meditative moments, the mood is predominantly upbeat, with vigorous rock drums and percussion continually spurring things on and introducing crescendos that go nowhere. Yanni's seven-member band is augmented by a 50-piece orchestra, with the ensemble amplified to a volume that borders on the shrill.

- Charlie Adams – drums
- Charlie Bisharat – violin
- Karen Briggs – violin
- Ric Fierabracci – bass guitar
- Michael "Kalani" Bruno – percussion
- Julie Homi – keyboards
- Bradley Joseph – keyboards
- Shardad Rohani – Conductor

=== Tour production ===
- Management/Tour Direction: Vincent Corry
- Production Manager: David "Gurn" Kaniski
- Yanni's Personal Assistant: Susan Smela
- Sound Engineer: Tommy Sterling
- Monitor Engineer: Paul Sarault
- Monitor Engineer / Technician: Curtis Kelly
- Keyboard Tech/Piano Tuner: Peter Maher
- Backline Technician: Jeffrer Buswell
- Lighting Crew Chief: Gus Thomson
- Tour Production Assistant: Danny Hayes & Wade Chandler
- Lighting and Stage Design: David Kaniski
- Tour Accountant: Diane Kramer, Numbers, Inc.
- Yanni's Wardrobe designed by Nolan Miller
- Band Wardrobe: Lynn Bugai
- Yamaha CFIII Concert Grand Courtesy of the Yamaha Corporation of America, Keyboard Division
- Program Design: Norman Moore
- Orchestrations and arrangements by Shardad Rohani, John Rinehimer, and Jeffrey Silverman.
- Additional orchestration work by Chris Bankey.
- Transcriptions and arrangement preparation by Shardad Rohani and Richard Boukas.

=== Tour dates ===
Date	City	Country	Venue
June 6, 1993	Baltimore	United States	Pier Six Concert Pavilion
June 8, 1993	New York City	United States	Gershwin Theatre
June 9, 1993	New York City	United States	Gershwin Theatre
June 10, 1993	New York City	United States	Gershwin Theatre
June 11, 1993	New York City	United States	Gershwin Theatre
June 12, 1993	New York City	United States	Gershwin Theatre
June 13, 1993	New York City	United States	Gershwin Theatre
June 18, 1993	Tempe	United States	Gammage Auditorium
June 19, 1993	Los Angeles	United States	Greek Theatre
June 23, 1993	Concord	United States	Concord Pavilion
June 25, 1993	Park City	United States	ParkWest
June 26, 1993	Morrison	United States	Red Rocks Amphitheatre
July 2, 1993	The Woodlands	United States	Cynthia Woods Mitchell Pavilion
July 7, 1993	Hoffman Estates	United States	Poplar Creek Music Theater
July 8, 1993	Noblesville	United States	Deer Creek Music Center
July 9, 1993	Clarkston	United States	Pine Knob Music Theatre
July 10, 1993	Kettering	United States	Fraze Pavilion
July 11, 1993	Columbus	United States	Ohio Theatre
July 13, 1993	Cincinnati	United States	Riverbend Music Center
July 16, 1993	Fort Lauderdale	United States	Broward Center for the Performing Arts
July 17, 1993	Fort Lauderdale	United States	Broward Center for the Performing Arts
July 19, 1993	Charlotte	United States	Blockbuster Pavilion
July 21, 1993	Richmond	United States	Classic Amphitheater
July 22, 1993	Burgettstown	United States	Coca-Cola Star Lake Amphitheater
July 23, 1993	Holmdel Township	United States	Garden State Arts Center
July 25, 1993	Mansfield	United States	Great Woods Center for the Performing Arts
September 23, 1993	Acropolis of Athens	Greece	Odeon of Herodes Atticus
September 24, 1993	Acropolis of Athens	Greece	Odeon of Herodes Atticus
September 25, 1993	Acropolis of Athens	Greece	Odeon of Herodes Atticus

== Certifications ==
Region	Certification	Certified units/sales
Canada (Music Canada)	Gold	50,000^{^}
United States (RIAA)	Platinum	1,000,000^{^}
^{^} Shipments figures based on certification alone.
