= Chameleon Days =

Studio album by Yanni
- Released: August 30, 1988
- Genres: Instrumental, new-age
- Length: 42:45
- Label: Private Music
- Producer: Yanni

Yanni chronology
Out of Silence (1987)	Chameleon Days (1988)	Niki Nana (1989)

Professional ratings
Review scores
Source	Rating
AllMusic	3/5 stars

Chameleon Days is the fourth studio album by Greek keyboardist and composer Yanni, released on the Private Music label in 1988. It peaked at #2 on Billboard's "Top New Age Albums" chart in the same year. Its corresponding concert tour was the 1988 Concert Series.

The liner notes dedicate the album to Anna Kalliani.

== Background ==
On his new album, Chameleon Days, Yanni reveals a more upbeat, playful and high-spirited side to his nature than many of his fans may be familiar with. "I tried on this album to incorporate instrumental sounds familiar to anybody. I used a lot of acoustic piano, synth harmonica, whistle and other sounds to get away from the coldness of pure synthesizer", says Yanni. Acoustic percussionist, Charlie Adams, joins Yanni on several pieces, adding a more natural dimension. Yanni's trademark symphonic scope is very apparent on Chameleon Days, as is the intensity of feeling that marked his previous two albums on Private Music.

== Album ==
=== Track listing ===
No.	Title	Length
1.	"Swept Away"	4:41
2.	"Marching Season"	5:34
3.	"Chasing Shadows"	5:42
4.	"The Rain Must Fall"	4:36
5.	"Days of Summer"	4:22
6.	"Reflections of Passion" (later the title selection for Yanni's sixth album)	4:31
7.	"Walkabout"	4:32
8.	"Everglade Run"	5:03
9.	"A Word in Private"	3:43

=== Personnel ===
- All music composed and produced by Yanni
- Charlie Adams – Acoustic, Electronic Drums & Percussion

=== Production ===
- Chameleon Days was recorded in its entirety on keyboards at Yanni's home studio on the 3324 Sony 24-track Digital Recorder
- Engineered by: Yanni
- Assistant Engineer: Charlie Adams
- Mastered by: Chris Bellman
- Technical Support: John Tesh
- Technical Advisor: Jerry Steckling
- Photography: Phillip Dixon
- Art Direction & Design: Norman Moore

== 1988 Concert Series ==
=== Dates ===
October – December 1988

=== Cities ===
6 cities

=== Set list ===
Selections from Keys to Imagination, Out of Silence, and Chameleon Days.

=== Band ===
- Charlie Adams – drums
- John Tesh – keyboards
- Joyce Imbesi – keyboards

=== Production ===
ASASU/ASU Events and SRO Productions

=== Tour dates ===
Date	City	Country	Venue
October 20, 1988	San Francisco	United States	Davies Auditorium
October 28, 1988	Dallas	United States	McFarlin Auditorium
November 6, 1988	Seattle	United States	Moore Theatre
November 10, 1988	Phoenix	United States	Gammage Memorial Auditorium
November 19, 1988	Minneapolis	United States	Orchestra Hall
December 2, 1988	Los Angeles	United States	Wiltern Theatre

== In popular culture ==
- NBC Sports used "Everglade Run" for the closing credits of their Super Bowl XXIII coverage.
- CBS Sports used "Marching Season" for their "Dream Season" promos in 1990. NBC Sports also used "Marching Season" for the pregame intro for Super Bowl XXIII.
- CBS Sports used "Chasing Shadows" for their Daytona 500 starting grids in 1989, 1992, and 1994.
- NBA Hardwood Classics used "Swept Away" in "Come Fly With Me (1989)".
