= Charlie Adams (drummer) =

American drummer (born 1954)

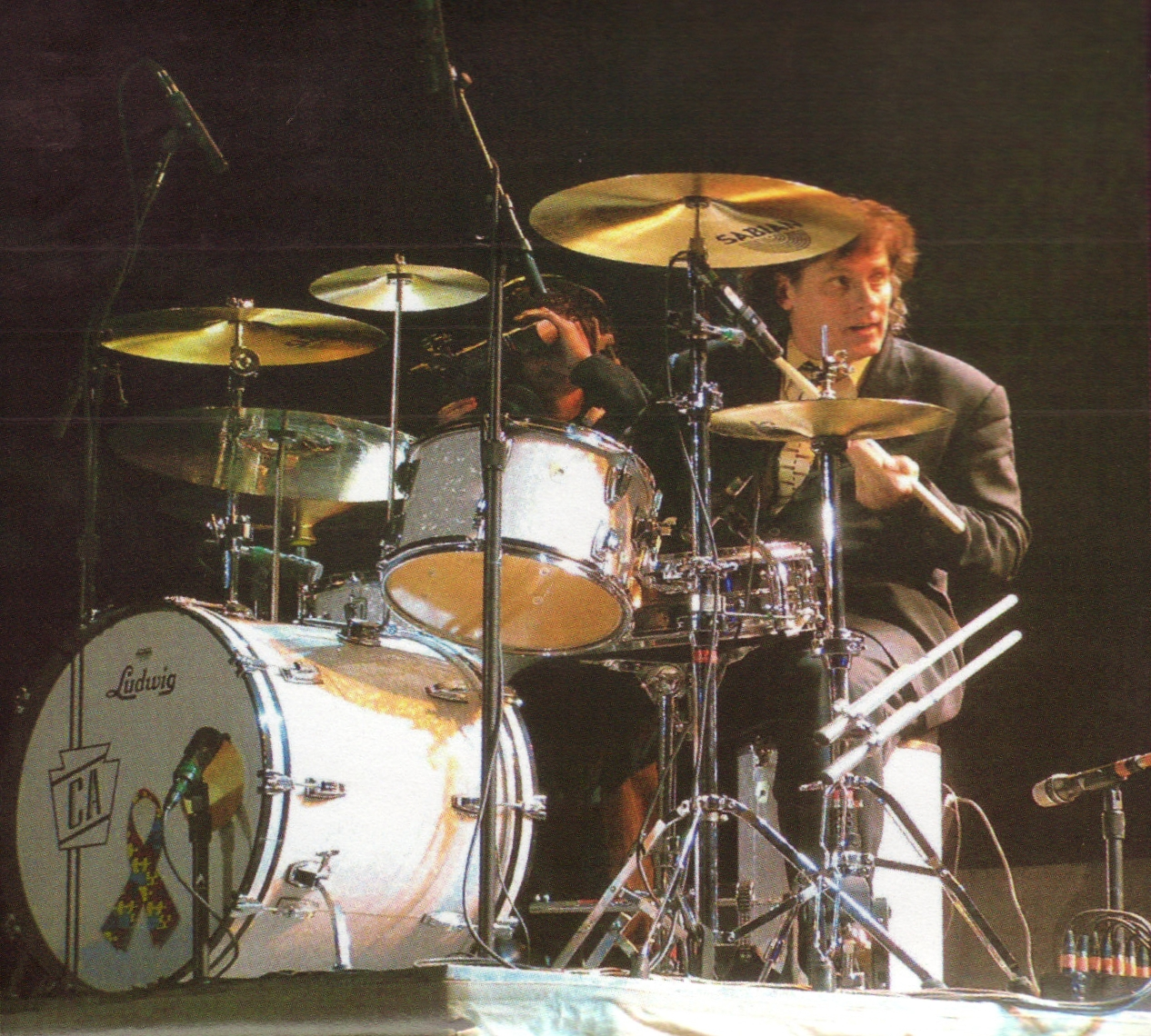

Background information
- Born: May 8, 1954 (age 72); Joliet, Illinois, United States
- Instruments: Drums; Percussion; Drum engineer
- Years active: 1975–present
- Formerly of: Chameleon

Charlie Adams (born May 8, 1954) is an American drummer, best known for playing in Yanni's touring band, after having played with Yanni in the early 1980s rock band Chameleon. Adams was born in Joliet, Illinois.

== Music career ==
=== Early life ===
Adams was born and raised in Joliet, Illinois. Prior to joining Chameleon, he taught drums to local students, including future Smashing Pumpkins drummer Jimmy Chamberlin.

=== Chameleon ===
Band members of regional rock band Chameleon included Adams on drums, vocals, and percussion; Yanni on keyboards and synthesizers; Dugan McNeill on lead vocals and bass guitars; Johnny Donaldson on all guitars; and Mark Anthony on lead vocals and keyboards. Their albums included Chameleon, Techno-color, Hologram Sky, and Balance. The group was noted for Adams' revolving gyroscope drum kit, who played his rapidly spinning drums before Mötley Crüe's Tommy Lee's similar arrangement.

=== Yanni ===
In 1987, Yanni formed his first touring band to promote his album Out of Silence, as well as selections from Keys to Imagination. This early band included Yanni, John Tesh and Joyce Imbesi on keyboards, and Adams on drums. He is also featured in both Live at the Acropolis released in 1994 and Live at Royal Albert Hall released in 1995.

Adams did not join the Tribute concert at the Taj Mahal and Forbidden City as he had to help raise his son with autism issues and thus was replaced by rock/jazz drummer Joel Taylor for the entire tour. After Yanni's hiatus following Tribute, Adams returned in 2001.

Adams reunited again with Yanni for the 2003/2004 Ethnicity concert tour.

=== Discography ===
Adams is credited as drummer or percussionist in the following albums, produced by Yanni unless otherwise noted.

Year	Tour / Album	Billboard New Age (peak)	Billboard 200 (peak)	Notes
1987	Out of Silence			
1988	Chameleon Days			
1988	A Thousand Summers			John Tesh
1989	Niki Nana	2		
1992	Yanni Gift Set (Reflections of Passion/In Celebration of Life)			
1992	Romantic Moments			
1992	Dare to Dream	2	32	Grammy-nominated (New Age)
1994	Live at the Acropolis	1	5	Sept. 1993 concerts at the Acropolis of Athens; second best selling music video of all time
1999	Love Songs			
2006	Yanni Live! The Concert Event	1	84	2004 concert; No. 4 selling New Age album of both 2006 and 2007; Peaked at No. 6 Billboard Top Independent Album (2006)
2010	Love Songs/Reflections of Passion			

=== Influences ===
Adams has indicated his musical influences to include: Buddy Rich; the Beatles; Emerson, Lake and Palmer; Black Sabbath; and Led Zeppelin.
