= Yanni =

Greek musician and composer (born 1954)

Yanni Γιάννης Χρυσομάλλης
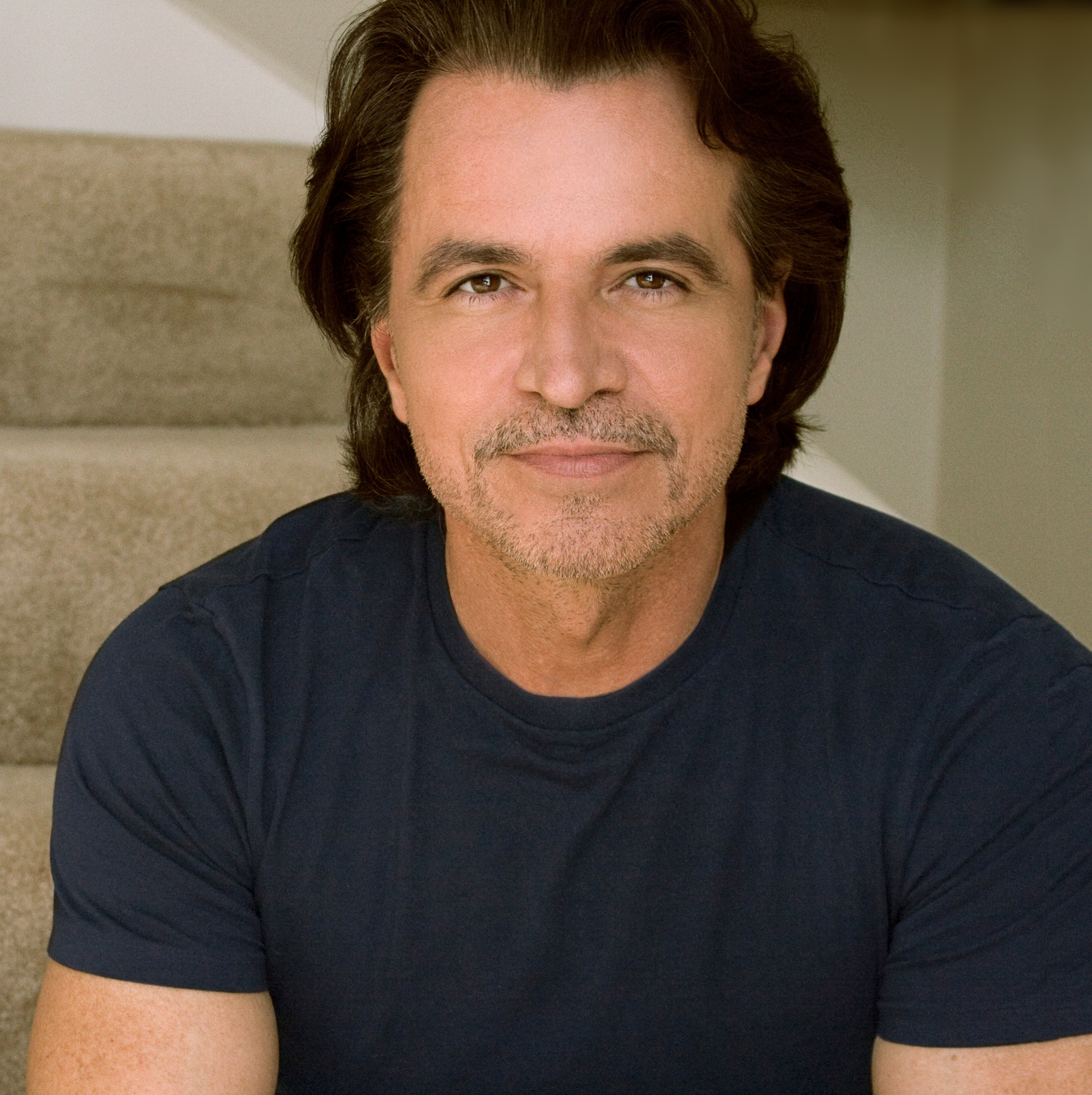
- Yanni in 2007

Background information
- Born: Yiannis Chryssomallis; November 14, 1954 (age 72); Kalamata, Greece
- Genres: Contemporary instrumental, instrumental crossover, world, new-age
- Instruments: Piano, keyboards
- Works: Discography
- Years active: 1977–present
- Labels: Private Music/Windham Hill/BMG; Virgin/EMI; Image Entertainment; Yanni Wake/Disney Pearl Series
- Formerly of: Chameleon
- Website: www.yanni.com

Yiannis Chryssomallis (Greek: Γιάννης Χρυσομάλλης; born November 14, 1954), known professionally as Yanni (/ˈjɑːni/ YAH-nee), is a Greek composer, keyboardist, pianist, and music producer.

Yanni uses the musical shorthand that he developed as a child, blending jazz, classical, soft rock, and world music to create predominantly instrumental works. Although this genre of music was not well suited for commercial pop radio and music television, Yanni received international recognition by producing concerts at historic monuments and by producing videos that were broadcast on public television. His breakthrough concert, Live at the Acropolis, yielded the second best-selling music concert video of all time. Additional historic sites for Yanni's concerts have included India's Taj Mahal, China's Forbidden City, the United Arab Emirates' Burj Khalifa, Russia's Kremlin, Puerto Rico's El Morro castle, Lebanon's ancient city of Byblos, Tunisia's Roman Theatre of Carthage, India's Laxmi Vilas Palace, the Egyptian pyramids and Great Sphinx of Giza, and the Amman Citadel.

At least sixteen of Yanni's albums have peaked at No. 1 in Billboard's "Top New Age Album" category, and two albums (Dare to Dream and In My Time) received Grammy Award nominations. Yanni has performed in more than 30 countries on five continents, and through late 2015 had performed live in concert before more than 5 million people and had accumulated more than 40 platinum and gold albums globally, with sales totaling more than 25 million copies. A longtime fundraiser for public television, Yanni's compositions have been used on commercial television programs, especially for sporting events. He has written film scores and the music for an award-winning British Airways television commercial.

Yanni popularized the combination of electronic music synthesizers with a full symphony orchestra. He has employed musicians of various nationalities and has incorporated a variety of exotic instruments to create music that has been called an eclectic fusion of ethnic sounds. Influenced by his encounters with cultures around the world, Yanni has been called a "true global artist" and his music is said to reflect his "one world, one people" philosophy.

== Early life ==
Yanni was born November 14, 1954, in Kalamata, Greece, the son of a banker, Sotiri Chryssomallis, and a homemaker, Felitsa (short for Triandafelitsa, which means "rose"). He displayed musical talent at a young age, playing the piano at the age of 6. His parents encouraged him to learn at his own pace and in his own way, without formal music training. The self-taught musician continues to use the "musical shorthand" that he developed as a child, rather than employ traditional musical notation.

Yanni set a Greek national record in the 50-meter freestyle swimming competition at age 14.

In November 1972, Yanni moved from Greece to the United States to attend the University of Minnesota beginning in January 1973, majoring in psychology. For a time he earned money by washing dishes at the student union. Yanni later explained that learning English forced him to read each paragraph several times in what he called a slow and frustrating process, but which helped him memorize the material and do well on tests. He received a B.A. degree in psychology in 1976.

During his time as a student, Yanni played in a local rock band and continued to study piano and other keyboard instruments. Upon graduating, when he dedicated himself exclusively to music for one full year and found he was the happiest he had ever been, he said he decided music would be his life's work.

== Music career ==
In 1977, Yanni joined the Minneapolis-based rock group Chameleon, performing with its founder, drummer Charlie Adams, with whom he would work into the 2010s. While in Minneapolis, Yanni also worked with choreographer Loyce Houlton to provide music for dance works produced by the Minnesota Dance Theatre. After touring with Chameleon from 1980 to 1984, Yanni moved to Los Angeles in pursuit of movie soundtrack work.

=== 1980s to early 1990s: Emergence and recognition ===
In 1980, Yanni recorded and produced his first album Optimystique, which Atlantic Records re-released in 1984 and Private Music re-released in 1989.

Yanni formed a band in 1987 and began to tour in 1988 with an ensemble including pianist/singer John Tesh and drummer Charlie Adams, promoting his early albums Keys to Imagination, Out of Silence, and Chameleon Days. A highlight of the tour was a performance with the Dallas Symphony Orchestra that elicited a positive review, considered seminal to Yanni's public recognition, from a Dallas Times Herald critic. Yanni's emergence was said to be "timed perfectly" with the growing popularity of contemporary instrumental music. In this time frame, Yanni wrote motion picture soundtracks for Steal the Sky (1988), Heart of Midnight (1988), I Love You Perfect (1989), She'll Take Romance (1990), When You Remember Me (1990), Children of the Bride (1990), and Hua qi Shao Lin (1994).

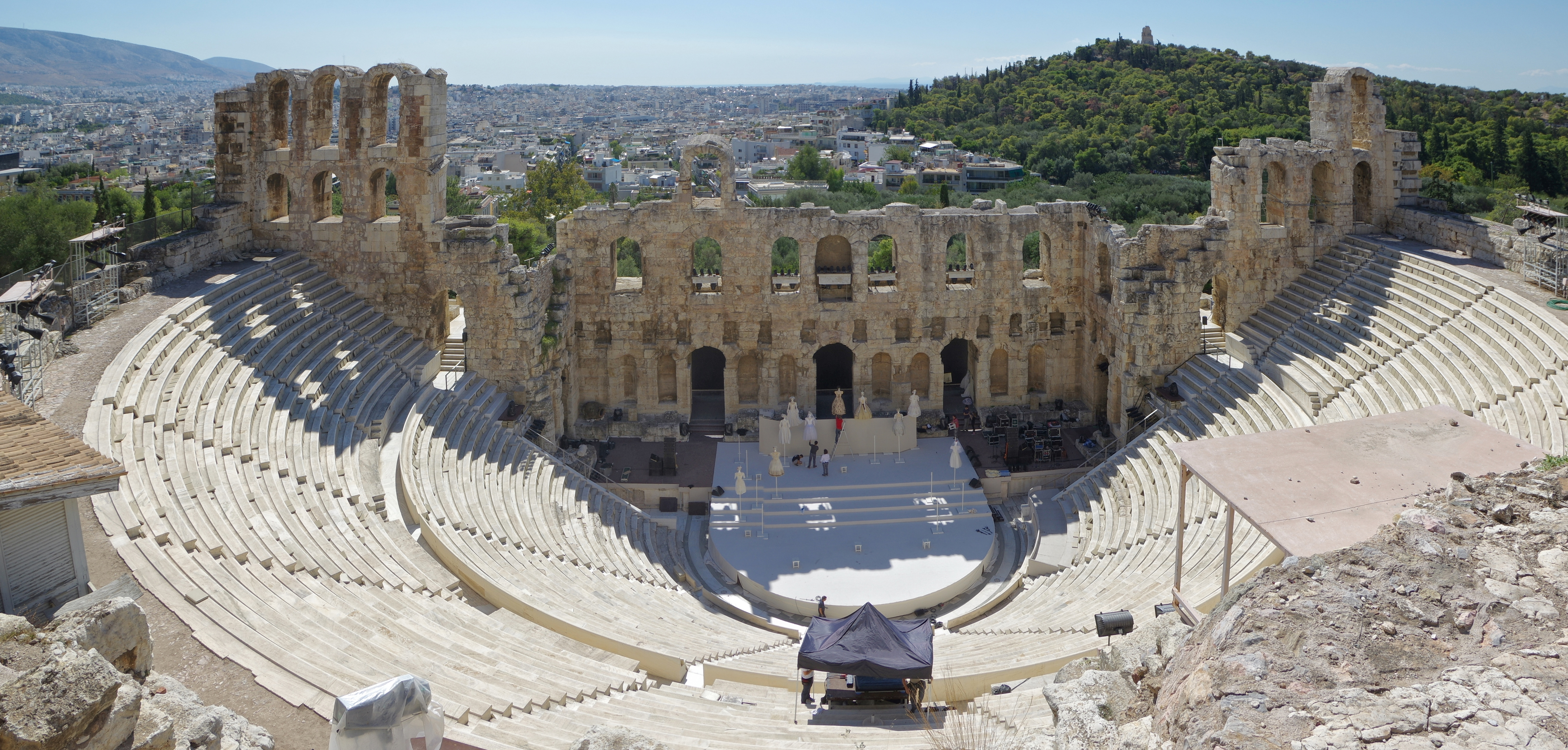
The Odeon of Herodes Atticus at the Acropolis of Athens, site of Yanni's September 1993 breakthrough concert Yanni Live at the Acropolis, performed in his native country Greece.

Yanni gained visibility as the result of his November 1990 appearances in People magazine and on The Oprah Winfrey Show with actress Linda Evans, with whom he had been in a relationship since 1989. However, high-visibility appearances on public television, best-selling records and videos, and overflow concerts earned him recognition beyond his relationship with Evans.

Dare to Dream, released in 1992, was Yanni's first Grammy nominated album. It included "Aria," a song based on Léo Delibes' The Flower Duet (Lakmé, 1883) and popularized by an award-winning British Airways commercial. A second Grammy nominated album, In My Time, followed in 1993.

=== 1990s: Acropolis, world concerts, exhaustion and renewal ===
From Live at the Acropolis (1994):
"Nostalgia"
At the 1993 Acropolis concert, Yanni dedicated "Nostalgia" to the people of his homeland Greece, where he had not lived since 1972.

Yanni's breakthrough concert, Live at the Acropolis, was filmed in September 1993 at the 2,000-year-old Herodes Atticus Theater at the Acropolis of Athens, an album, VHS and Laserdisc being released in 1994. Acropolis was Yanni's first live album, and used his core band with a full sixty piece orchestra, the Royal Philharmonic Orchestra which was arranged and conducted by Iranian-American musician Shahrdad Rohani.

Without financial backing, Yanni risked $2 million of his personal fortune in the Acropolis production in a strategy to boost his artistic profile and open new markets for his music. The resulting video was broadcast on PBS and became one of its most popular programs ever, seen in 65 countries by half a billion people. It became the second best-selling music concert video of all time (after Michael Jackson's Thriller), selling more than 7 million copies worldwide.

In March 1997, Yanni became one of the few Western artists permitted to perform and record at the Taj Mahal in India. Yanni followed in May 1997 with performances at the Forbidden City in Beijing, China, becoming the first Western artist in modern times permitted to perform at the historic site. Live broadcasts of the two concerts were seen by 100 million television viewers throughout the world. The two events formed the live album and video, Tribute, released in November 1997.

After negotiating the demands of gaining permission to perform at the Taj Mahal and Forbidden City in 1997, breaking up with Linda Evans in early 1998, and completing a long world tour later in 1998, Yanni halted his music career. Yanni later related that he had become depressed, and returned to Greece to live with his parents for three months before traveling the world. He didn't do an interview for two years, later explaining, "I traveled. I wanted to see other people's ideas of life, get out of the American dream."

=== 2000s to 2010: After a hiatus, new perspectives ===
In 2000, after the two-year hiatus, Yanni released If I Could Tell You, his first studio album in seven years. The album sold 55,000 copies in its first week and landed at No. 20 on the Billboard charts, his highest debut to date. Yanni described the album as more of an even-tempered "listening" album, less dramatic than the live concert albums Live at the Acropolis or Tribute. He explained that he himself created all the album's sounds, including apparent vocalizations, through the manipulation of sound in his studio.

The music in Yanni's 2003 album Ethnicity represented many of the world's cultures, Yanni saying it uses ethnicity to reflect the color and beauty of a multicultural society. The album was released near the publication date of Yanni's autobiography, Yanni in Words. On October 23, 2003, Yanni performed a keyboard instrumental version of The Star-Spangled Banner before Game 5 of the 2003 World Series.

For the first time in his career, Yanni brought vocalists to the forefront in the Ric Wake collaboration Yanni Voices, the artist's first studio album in six years. PBS broadcast video of a November 2008 Voices Acapulco concert weeks before the album's March 24, 2009 release by Walt Disney Records' Disney Pearl Imprint, the album release preceding a tour produced by Pearl's Buena Vista Concerts division.

The album Mexicanisimo, released in November of Mexico's bicentennial year 2010, was a tribute to that country through Yanni's collaborative interpretation of its folk music. It involved collaboration with singer-songwriter Pepe Aguilar and singer-actress Lucero.

=== 2010s: New sound designs, and a return to world tours ===
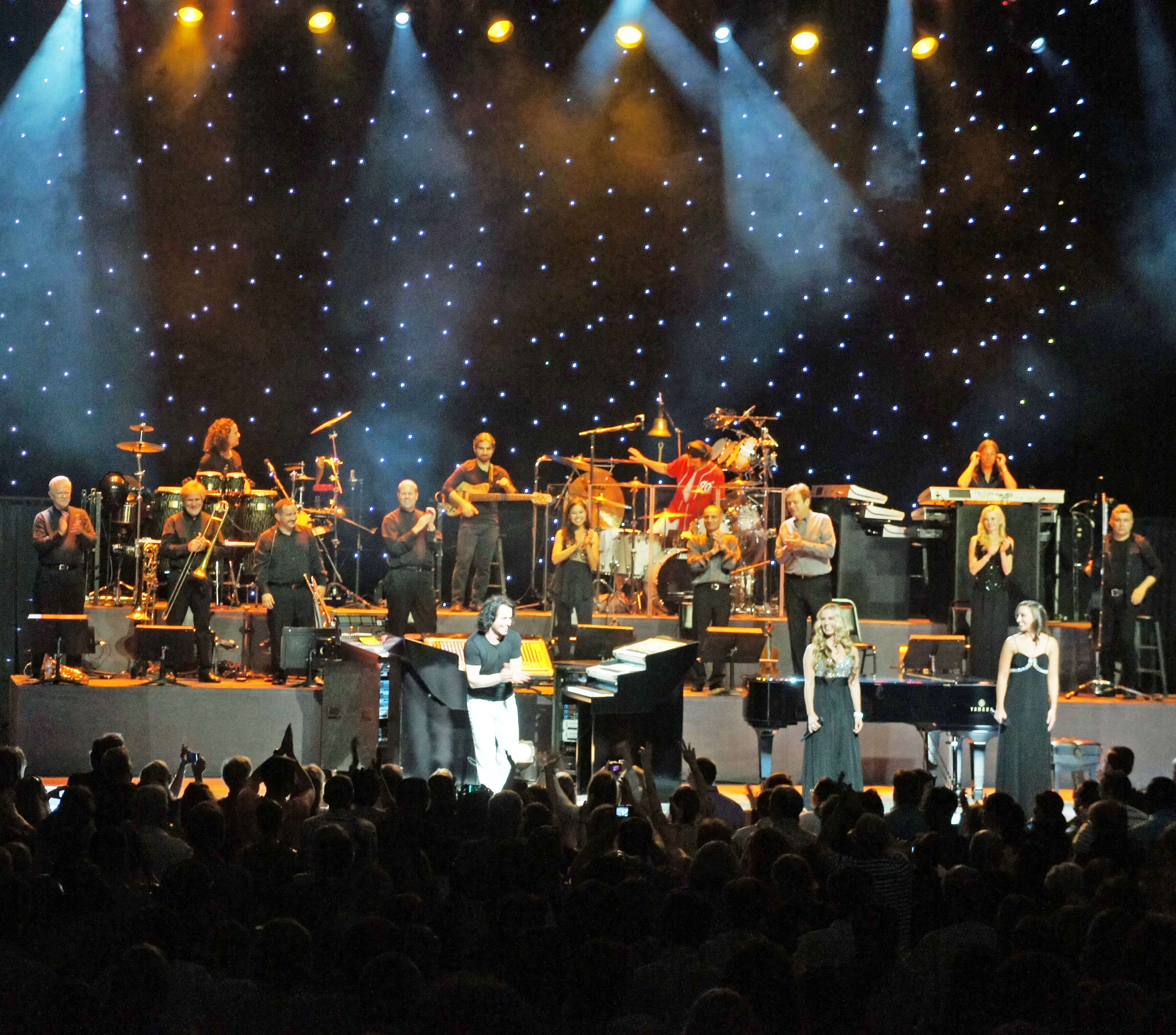
Yanni onstage with his orchestra and vocalists. While performing, Yanni divides his time among two decks of electronic keyboards and an acoustic piano, and conducts his orchestra.

The Truth of Touch album was released in February 2011, Yanni's first studio album of new material since Ethnicity eight years earlier. Truth of Touch's varied content reflected contemporary instrumental, electronic, and cinematic influences, and crossed over into popular, new age, and world music. Though Yanni said that Truth of Touch was started by experimenting with new sound designs, Allmusic's James Christopher Monger said that the album shows Yanni returning to his instrumental roots, and should appeal to fans of his music from the mid-1990s. Three of fifteen tracks on the predominantly instrumental album included vocals from respective Yanni Voices vocalists.

In April 2012, Yanni released the Live at El Morro, Puerto Rico live album CD and DVD which were recorded and filmed at two outdoor concerts on December 16 and 17, 2011 on the grounds of the Castillo (Fort) San Felipe del Morro ("El Morro"), a UNESCO World Heritage Site in San Juan, Puerto Rico. The recorded concerts were broadcast on PBS beginning in March 2012, the production constituting Yanni's tenth collaboration with that organization.

Yanni performed again in China in the February 9, 2013, CCTV Spring Festival Gala (annual audience 700 million) with Chinese zither artist Chang Jing in what was the first year that CCTV had invited foreign artists to perform. For the performance, Yanni released a single "East Meets West" which was a mashup of his several famous songs (Santorini, North Shore of Matsushima) together with a solo part performed on Chinese zither.

Yanni's 2010s tours included new vocalists, distinct from the 2008–2009 Yanni Voices vocalists, though the setlists remained predominantly instrumental.

In March 2014, Yanni released his seventeenth studio album, Inspirato, a collaboration with operatic tenor Plácido Domingo and producer Ric Wake that, like Yanni Voices five years earlier, highlighted vocal performances. In Inspirato, distinguished operatic vocalists performed remakes of songs that Yanni had previously released over his career, the songs' titles and lyrics being predominantly in the Italian language.

On October 30 and 31, 2015, Yanni performed two concerts on the grounds of the Egyptian pyramids and Great Sphinx of Giza, his first performance in Egypt. The concerts included fireworks and a video broadcast from International Space Station commander Scott Kelly, and were recorded in 4K HD for subsequent broadcast on PBS. To convey an image of stable security after the Egyptian Crisis (2011–14), an Egyptian security force of 3,000 people secured the concert area.

In December 2015, Yanni produced a song, "Seven Billion Dreams," for a NASA video that marked the 15th anniversary of the International Space Station.

On December 18, 2015, Yanni released the single "Desert Soul" from his eighteenth studio album, Sensuous Chill, which was released on January 29, 2016. The album, which, being built around synthesizers, programmed rhythms and electronic sounds, was said to "come full circle" to his early-1980s albums.

Yanni's single, "When Dreams Come True", called a "minimal piano-led" piece, was composed incrementally throughout a 60-date North American tour as a series of improvisations performed during successive shows. Its first complete live performance was in February 2019 at the Winter at Tantora Festival in Al-'Ula, Saudi Arabia, a UNESCO World Heritage Site.

Yanni's August 2019 single honoring his daughter Krystalán is called "Ladyhawk", alluding to how she watches over him like a guardian angel.

In November 2019, Yanni released single "Blue", taking inspiration from the ocean.

In the 2010s, Yanni's international tours included performances in more than thirty countries on five continents, including (alphabetically) Argentina, Armenia, Bahrain, Belarus, Brazil, Bulgaria, Canada, Chile, China, Costa Rica, Czech Republic, Egypt, Germany, Hungary, India, Indonesia, Israel, Jordan, Kuwait, Lebanon, Mexico, Oman, Panama, Poland, Qatar, Romania, Russia, Saudi Arabia, Singapore, South Korea, Sri Lanka, Thailand, Tunisia, Turkey, Ukraine, United Arab Emirates, United Kingdom, United States (including Puerto Rico), and Uzbekistan.

=== 2020s ===
In August 2020, Yanni released the studio album "In His Purest Form," containing solo piano performances of his previously released songs, and his first piano solo album since In My Time (1993).

In late 2021, Yanni began to offer non-fungible tokens.

== Influences, music and concerts ==
=== Musical influences ===
From childhood, Yanni accepted a wide variety of musical styles, listening to radio stations from Northern Africa, Arab countries, and Europe. He observed that "there were no rock stations or classical stations—each station would just play everything." Yanni's music is said to reflect his encounters with cultures around the world and embody his philosophy of "one world, one people." In this vein, Booth Newspapers' Jeffrey Kaczmarczyk perceived the eclectic inspirations of Yanni's music to be an element of his success: Yanni's "Middle Eastern and Oriental scales and mixed meters sound just exotic enough to entice his middle-of-the-road fans, but not so authentic as to mystify folks who grew up with a backbeat, so you can't lose it," adding that certain songs "leave you with a sense that you've just heard a bit of a steel drum or a Greek bouzouki or a Japanese koto or possibly all three."

Samples of Yanni's work, early in his career and more recently.
"Butterfly Dance" (recorded 1980)
Liner notes from Yanni's first album Optimystique say he recorded the album in 1980 (age 25). Early in his career Yanni focused heavily on the electronic side of music.

"Truth of Touch" (released 2011)
The title track from the Truth of Touch album is more orchestral than his earliest work, but Yanni said that even this 2011 album was started by experimenting with new sound designs.

Yanni's musical influences include music from Asia, Latin America, and the Middle East, as well as classical, rock and roll, and electronic music. Yanni explained that the 1970s, with its new technology and electronic instruments, were particularly influential at that stage in his career, and that even recently his Truth of Touch album (2011) was started by experimenting with new sound designs. Having been exposed to classical music very early in life—listening to Bach at age 8—he counts several classical pianists and composers among his influences, citing Beethoven as a favorite and Chopin as "No. 2 favorite." Yanni mentioned being influenced not only by classical composers like Mozart and Bach, but also rock and roll bands such as Led Zeppelin, the People!, and Black Sabbath.

Yanni explained that "the most influence I've ever had from music was doing (soundtracks for) movies ... mostly instrumental music," mentioning his love for the work of Jerry Goldsmith and John Williams. The Augusta Chronicle's Kelly Jasper noted that most of Yanni's music is instrumental, indicating that Yanni surmised that the lack of lyrics is what allowed his music to become popular internationally. Yanni went on to say, "There are no lyrics in my music for the most part, so the whole message is transmitted through the rhythm, melody, and sounds, and I think that has to do with crossing all the borders and being able to go to different countries." "It is very difficult, if not impossible, to lie with instrumental music because it deals in emotions only." He has also said that words operate in a different area of the brain, and lyrics "tend to put a song into a box."

However, Yanni performed with four vocalists in the forefront in Yanni Voices (2008–2009), and performed with vocalists on tours and in the Live at El Morro, Puerto Rico concerts (December 2011) and CD/DVD (2012). In late 2011 Yanni remarked that he tends to prefer instrumental music "because it's more open, but the human voice too can be the most expressive instrument known to man. There is power to it." Referring to his creative experiences on the 2009 Voices project, Yanni explained that "while most of the music I write is instrumental, I love to use the human voice as another instrument."

=== Music genres distinguished from the "new age" spiritual movement ===
Lines on maps

These lines really don't exist. They are made up—completely—and they perpetuate this illusion that somehow we're all different from each other. I think the world would be a much better place if some day, we stopped pretending that these lines exist and we concentrated on our similarities rather than our differences.

— Comments during
Live at the Acropolis concert
September 1993

While Yanni has said that new age is "a spiritual definition more than a musical definition," his music is said to be "adopted by" the New Age movement as it gained mainstream momentum. His music is also called contemporary instrumental and has been described as "an instrumental blend of fusion-jazz, world music, classical, and soft rock." However, at least as early as 1988, Yanni was said to shun labels such as "Greek" and "new age," emphasizing that "when someone says new age music, I think of something that you put on in the background while you're vacuuming the house. I don't want to relax the audience; I want to engage them in the music, get them interested." Distinguishing his work from what others have called ambient mood music, Yanni pointed out in 1994: "New age implies a more subdued, more relaxed music than what I do. My music can be very rhythmic, very energetic, even very ethnic."

In 2012, Yanni remarked that he has never liked putting art into categories or assigning labels, adding that he always composed music "to honestly reflect the lessons learned and the experiences I have shared throughout my life." For example, Yanni's university study of psychology influenced his music: "When I create music, it is a reflection of my soul, my experiences in life and my relationships with other people and cultures. Psychology, and understanding who we are as people in this world, is present in almost every creative thought I have."

=== Unconventional career track ===
The genre of Yanni's music made it unsuitable for most commercial radio or for music television. In 2012 Yanni expressed the importance of PBS to his career, saying that the network "always allowed me to present my music without any censorship or influence, and encouraged me to be the artist that I am," and had been "a great part of my career for over 20 years."

Yanni took an unconventional path to recognition, for example, by risking his personal fortune to fund historic-monument events such as his 1993 Acropolis concerts, by producing specials on public television, by creating alone in his home-built studio, and by performing many of his own production duties—thus by-passing the conventional music industry. In 2000, The Washington Post's David Segal wrote that Yanni was "a living metaphor for 'success on your own terms,' the dream of every American with an idea that is either ridiculed or ignored."

=== Music ===
In an early-career review in the Dallas Times Herald in the late 1980s, Yanni's concert with the Dallas Symphony Orchestra was described as "exhilarating, moving and inspiring." In 1995, The Los Angeles Times' Don Heckman wrote that Yanni's music is "based on sweeping romantic melodies underscored with energetic Mediterranean rhythms." More analytically, the Hartford Courant's Steve Metcalf "deconstructed" Yanni's music as being "from a harmonic standpoint, constructed of materials found in a lot of late-19th, early 20th century classical music. It is essentially tonal, tinged with mild whiffs of dissonance here and there, sometimes rhythmically frisky, graspable on first listening, and self-evidently mood-inducing. There are two basic moods to Yanni music: struttingly heroic with martial overtones, and dreamily contemplative ... A kind of peaceful, easy-feeling link between pop music and classical music."

More recently, Allmusic's Mark Deming characterized Yanni's compositions and performances as having "a pronounced sense of drama, dynamics, and romanticism," writing that Yanni has a "commanding performance style." Rob Garratt wrote in The National that Yanni "breaks all the rules" in producing music "typically in two modes – poundingly heroic or reflectively ambient." In 2012 Howie Grapek remarked in The Palm Beach Post's PBPulse that "there are few modern-day composers with a unique sense of music and style which is truly their own. To compare new-age music with classic rock is a stretch, but for Yanni, it is possible. This Greek composer marries contemporary new-age spirituality with today's pop attitudes and delivers a unique sound." Yanni popularized the combination of electronic music synthesizers with a full scale symphony orchestra.

Having been called a "true global artist," Yanni has employed musicians of various nationalities, and has incorporated a variety of exotic instruments from around the world from an Australian didgeridoo to a Peruvian charango, to perform with his classical orchestra, rock rhythm section, and electronic keyboards. His music is described as "an eclectic fusion of ethnic sounds, from Native American chants to African rhythms and Asian harmonies." Before his 2015 concerts at the Egyptian Pyramids Yanni said that emotions are the same throughout the world, and that his predominantly instrumental music can communicate those emotions with people everywhere because it bypasses language.

The Morning Call's John L. Moser wrote that "trends come and trends go," but that Yanni's music "seems to defy trends and ... feels like it's music for all time." Moser interviewed the composer, asking if he intentionally tries to create "something that's going to last forever as opposed to something that's just going to sell 1 million copies right away," Yanni replied that "There's no way you can create art to last forever ... so you can't have that in your mind." Instead, describing his creative process, Yanni explained that his knowledge of music and instruments and his experience in different cultures is a "primordial soup that comes together and it shows itself and it appears. And it's fluid. It's effortless."

Yanni's popularity with the public and his success on public television have contrasted sharply with views of some critics. The more extreme criticisms include statements that Yanni's music is "aural wallpaper ... lacking in substance" or characterizing Yanni as a "no-talent poseur" whose music has little intellectual weight, while his fans' opinions have been paraphrased as calling Yanni a "highly original artist whose profound spirituality has created a unique kind of music." In this regard, one commentator wrote in 2019 that Yanni's songs are "hazy and undefinable" and "unstructured in the traditional way", paraphrasing Yanni's statement that listeners' responses depend on the degree to which they "invest themselves in the music", which has a "relentless focus on feeling rather than hooks".

Yanni claims to have had perfect pitch since childhood. He continues to use the "musical shorthand" that he developed as a child rather than employ traditional musical notation, and hires someone to perform what he calls the "tedious process" of making conventional written charts for orchestra members. Even so, since music is an auditory domain, Yanni must train the musicians in what cannot be conveyed in that writing.

A single thought

Everything great that has ever happened to humanity has begun as a single thought in someone's mind. And if any one of us is capable of such a thought, then all of us have the same capacity and capability, because we're all the same.

— Concert's closing comments,
Live at El Morro, Puerto Rico
December 2011

=== Concerts and live streaming ===
The Palm Beach Post's Howie Grapek remarked about an April 2012 performance that the show was not a one-man keyboard show, but spotlighted individual long solos showcasing the band members' talents, and that Yanni "loves giving them the opportunity to shine individually." Booth Newspapers' Jeffrey Kaczmarczyk commented that Yanni "has great sidemen – always has." Further, Yanni expands sound variety by using multiple interchangeable keyboards that are interconnected so that playing one keyboard can cause other keyboards to play corresponding notes emulating different instruments.

Yanni's concerts, known for their lighting and other technical aspects, require more than 2,000 timing cues for a show's lighting. Yanni's longtime lighting designer remarked in 2013 that the lighting is critically timed to Yanni's music itself, accommodating its variety of time signatures, further observing that since Yanni plays mostly theatrical venues rather than arenas, the lighting can include subtle moves and color. The lighting also emphasizes band members' solos, as well as specific moments in the concerts.

Commenting on Yanni's "great lighting" on the stage and "plenty of reverb in the audience," Booth Newspapers' Jeffrey Kaczmarczyk remarked that a Yanni concert "can be an intoxicating experience."

In early 2017 Yanni began his "An Evening in Conversation with Yanni" or "An intimate Conversation with Yanni" tour in which audience questions and on-stage participation guided the show, and Yanni played a piano without a band. In May–June 2019, Yanni performed a multi-night residency at New York's Lunt-Fontanne Theatre, two videos for which topped Billboard's Top Facebook Live Videos chart before other Yanni videos topped the same chart in October December 2019, and February 2020.

== Honors, awards and distinctions ==
In addition to performing at venues such as Royal Albert Hall (London; 1995 & 2014), Yanni has performed at such world landmarks as the Acropolis of Athens (Greece; 1993), the Taj Mahal (Agra, India; 1997), the Forbidden City (Beijing, China; 1997), the Burj Khalifa (the world's tallest building; Dubai, United Arab Emirates; 2011), the Kremlin (Moscow, Russia; 2011), the Castillo San Felipe del Morro ("El Morro" UNESCO World Heritage Site, in San Juan, Puerto Rico, U.S. territory; 2011), the ancient city of Byblos (UNESCO World Heritage Site, Lebanon; 2013), the Roman Theatre of Carthage (Tunis, Tunisia; 2014), Laxmi Vilas Palace (Vadodara, India; 2015), the Egyptian pyramids and Great Sphinx of Giza (Egypt, 2015), the Amman Citadel (Jordan, 2016), the Prambanan Temple (Indonesia, 2019) and Al-'Ula (UNESCO World Heritage Site, Saudi Arabia; 2019).

Rising in popularity with the new age music boom of the 1980s and 1990s, Yanni's music became more well known through adult alternative radio airplay, appearances on public television and in television commercials, as well as international music tours. Yanni's music has been used in television shows and televised sporting events, including the British Open (golf), the U.S. Open (golf), the Super Bowl, Wide World of Sports, U.S. Open tennis championships, the Tour de France, the World Figure Skating Championships, and the Olympic Games. He also composed music for ABC's World News Now.

From Live at the Acropolis (1994):
"Acroyali/Standing in Motion"
The Allmusic review of the Acropolis album characterized this song as "exotica," beginning with atmosphere and chime effects and evolving into an "adventurous orchestral and synth explosion" perceived as more ambitious than Yanni's studio recordings. This composition was thought by researchers to have the "Mozart effect."

"Santorini"
Santorini, the name of a Greek island and also the name Yanni in 2011 gave to his symbolically adopted panda cub, is a song included in primary school teachings throughout China. The Allmusic review of the Acropolis album selected this song as epitomizing musical balance, opening with percussive string fanfare but then allowing Yanni to be simply expressive on the acoustic piano as the orchestra toned down.

Yanni's "Acroyali/Standing in Motion" was determined to have the "Mozart effect" by the Journal of the Royal Society of Medicine (April 2001) because the composition is similar to Mozart's K 448 in tempo, structure, melodic and harmonic consonance and predictability, characteristics thought to decrease seizure activity and to enhance spatial-temporal performance.

During Yanni's October 2011 tour of China, Yanni became the first Western artist to be invited to adopt a giant panda (bear) cub at the Chengdu Research Base of Giant Panda Breeding, a "privilege ... usually reserved for countries rather than personalities." "Officials from the research base invited the musician to adopt the animal, saying their decision was made from the inspiration and harmony that derives from his music." Yanni named the panda "Santorini," also the name of a Greek island, explaining that the Greek word irini means 'peace'."

In February 2013, Yanni and Celine Dion were the first non-Chinese artists invited to perform (separately) in China at the CCTV Spring Festival Gala, a CCTV televised event with an annual audience of 700 million.

Billboard named Yanni their No. 5 "new age album artist of 2016". He was named to the same list in 2014 (No. 6), 2012 (ranked No. 5), 2011 (No. 1), 2010 (No. 4), 2009 (No. 3), 2007 (No. 4), and 2006 (No. 4).

Yanni's albums Dare to Dream (1992) and In My Time (1993) received Grammy Award nominations for Best New Age Album."

The PBS specials Live at the Acropolis and Tribute received Emmy Award nominations for Outstanding Individual Achievement in Lighting Direction (Electronic) for a Drama Series, Variety Series, Miniseries, Movie or Special, in 1994 and 1998, respectively. Lee Rose and David "Gurn" Kaniski Lighting Designers.

At least sixteen Yanni albums peaked at No. 1 in Billboard's "Top New Age Album" category, more than anyone except Jim Brickman and Mannheim Steamroller.

In addition to earning a B.A. in psychology in 1976 from the University of Minnesota, Twin Cities, Yanni received an honorary Doctor of Humane Letters from the same institution on May 6, 2004.

== Charitable and humanitarian activities ==
Yanni has had a collaborative relationship with the Public Broadcasting Service (PBS) in its fundraising efforts since the early years of his career, reportedly raising more than $13 million for that organization. The Yanni Live at El Morro, Puerto Rico production (2012) was Yanni's tenth collaboration with PBS.

Yanni has assisted the conservation efforts of the World Wide Fund for Nature (the World Wildlife Fund, WWF), sponsoring a symbolic "Panda Adoption Kit" program in which he guaranteed $50,000 in donations. Yanni has also been a spokesman for NASA.

Yanni has performed concerts in troubled areas of the world, such as in Tunisia one week after the July 17, 2014, terrorist attack that killed 14, and in Egypt to convey an image of stable security after the Egyptian Crisis (2011–14) but between whose two Great Pyramids concerts occurred the October 31, 2015, terrorist downing of Metrojet Flight 9268 in the Sinai Peninsula.

== Autobiography ==
Yanni's autobiography, Yanni in Words, co-authored by David Rensin, was published in February 2003, coinciding with the release of his Ethnicity album. The book became a New York Times best seller in the nonfiction category on March 2, 2003.

== Discography ==
=== Original studio albums ===
Studio albums

- Optimystique (1984)
- Keys to Imagination (1986)
- Out of Silence (1987)
- Chameleon Days (1988)
- Niki Nana (1989)
- Reflections of Passion (1990)
- In Celebration of Life (1991)
- Dare to Dream (1992)
- In My Time (1993)
- In The Mirror (1997)
- Port of Mystery (1997)
- Devotion: The Best of Yanni (1997)
- Love Songs (1997)
- Winter Light (1997)
- If I Could Tell You (2000)
- The Very Best of Yanni (2000)
- Ultimate Yanni (2003)
- Ethnicity (2003)
- Yanni Voices (2009) (Spanish version, Yanni Voces) (2009)
- Mexicanisimo (2010)
- Truth of Touch (2011)
- Inspirato (2014)
- Sensuous Chill (2016)
- In His Purest Form (2020)

Live albums

- Live at the Acropolis (1994)
- Tribute (1997)
- Yanni Live! The Concert Event (2006)
- Live at El Morro, Puerto Rico (2012)
- The Dream Concert: Live from the Great Pyramids of Egypt (2016)

== Bibliography ==
- Yanni with David Rensin, Yanni in Words, Miramax Books / Hyperion, New York, 2003.
- Winters, Kelly, Yanni biography (2004), Cengage Learning's Gale Publishing. (archive)
