= Optimystique =

- 1984 release front cover

Studio album by Yanni
- Released: 1984
- Recorded: 1980; Cookhouse Studios and Sound 80 (Minneapolis, Minnesota)
- Genres: Instrumental; pop rock
- Length: 38:41
- Labels: Independent (1980); Varèse Sarabande (1984); Private Music (1989)
- Producers: Jerry Steckling; Yanni

Yanni chronology
Optimystique (1984)	Keys to Imagination (1986)

Alternative cover
- 1989 release front cover

Professional ratings
Review scores
Source	Rating
AllMusic	2/5 stars

Optimystique is the debut studio album by Greek keyboardist, composer, and producer Yanni, released independently in 1980. It was re-released in 1984 by Varèse Sarabande and in 1989 by Private Music.

== Liner notes ==
Optimystique was recorded in 1980 and released for the first time in 1984. I considered re-recording or reworking the material before re-releasing it again, but the album has a very special sound representative of a particular time early in my career which I wanted to preserve. For me, it is a piece of my history I remember fondly.

== Track listing ==
All tracks are written by Yanni.

No.	Title	Length
1.	"The Sphynx"	4:13
2.	"Butterfly Dance"	6:26
3.	"Strings"	3:50
4.	"Twilight"	7:35
5.	"The Chase"	5:08
6.	"Farewell"	2:47
7.	"Turn of the Tide"	3:57
8.	"The Magus"	4:45 "Butterfly Dance" (1980) "Butterfly Dance" Early in his career Yanni focused heavily on the electronic side of music.

== Personnel ==
- All music composed and produced by Yanni
- Yanni – Synthesizers and Keyboards
- Ernest LaViolette – Drums and Percussion
- Tom Sterling – Bass guitar on "Twilight"
- Dugan McNeill – Bass guitar on "The Chase"
- Tony Matsis – Bouzouki on "Strings"
- Bruce Kurno – Harps

== Production ==
- Produced by Jerry Steckling and Yanni
- Executive Producers: Mark MacPherson and Tom Paske
- Engineered by Jerry Steckling
- Assistant Engineer: Chopper Black
- Recorded at Cookhouse Studios and Sound 80, Minneapolis, Minnesota
- Mastered by Chris Bellman at Bernie Grundman Mastering, Los Angeles
