= Out of Silence (Yanni album) =

- 2009 reissue cover

Studio album by Yanni
- Released: August 1987
- Genre: Instrumental
- Length: 46:19
- Label: Private Music
- Producers: Peter Baumann; Yanni

Yanni chronology
| Keys to Imagination (1986) | Out of Silence (1987) | Chameleon Days (1988) |

Out of Silence is the third studio album by Greek keyboardist and composer Yanni, released by Private Music in 1987. Its corresponding concert tour was the 1987 Concert Series.

The liner notes dedicate the album to his homeland in Kalamata, Greece respectively: "Dedicated to the town of Kalamata, Greece which stood strong and waited for me one last time."

The album was reissued in 2009 by Valley Entertainment.

== Album ==
=== Critical reception ===
Professional ratings
Review scores
| Source | Rating |
|---|---|
| AllMusic | 3/5 stars |

In a review by William Ruhlmann of AllMusic, "Yanni's second album, like his first (Keys to Imagination), was recorded entirety on synthesizers at his home studio. The composer/performer makes extensive use of the orchestral possibilities of electronics, creating big themes to play across elaborate, echoing rhythm tracks. Unlike much adult alternative music, it's constantly stimulating foreground music with an extremely modern sound."

=== Track listing ===
| No. | Title | Length |
|---|---|---|
| 1. | "Sand Dance" | 5:10 |
| 2. | "After the Sunrise" | 4:40 |
| 3. | "Standing in Motion" | 5:20 |
| 4. | "The Mermaid" | 3:46 |
| 5. | "Within Attraction" | 4:12 |
| 6. | "Street Level" | 4:18 |
| 7. | "Secret Vows" | 3:55 |
| 8. | "Point of Origin" | 6:05 |
| 9. | "Acroyali" | 5:05 |
| 10. | "Paths on Water" | 3:51 |

=== Personnel ===
- All music composed and produced by Yanni
- Acoustic, Electronic Drums and Percussions: Charlie Adams

=== Production ===
- Out of Silence was recorded in its entirety on keyboards at Yanni's home studio.
- Engineer: Jerry Steckling
- Mastered at Bernie Grundman Mastering (Los Angeles by Bernie Grundman)
- Photo-Illustration: Stafford/Wehlacz for Prima Vista Studios.
- Hair and Make-Up: Annette Zeglen
- Producer: Peter Baumann

== 1987 Concert Series ==
=== Dates ===
1987

=== Set list ===
Selections from Keys to Imagination and Out of Silence

=== The band ===
It was during this year that Yanni was putting together his first touring band to promote his album Out of Silence, as well as selections from Keys to Imagination. "Although I'd written, as always, with an orchestra in mind, I couldn't afford one, so I reproduced that sound in my studio with my synthesizers. But because I wanted to play everything live onstage, and not against tape, I needed three keyboard players and a drummer on the road", says Yanni. This first live band included Joyce Imbesi and John Tesh on keyboards, and Charlie Adams on drums.

=== Band ===
- Charlie Adams – drums
- John Tesh – keyboards
- Joyce Imbesi – keyboards
