= Keys to Imagination =

Studio album by Yanni
- Released: September 1986
- Genres: Instrumental, space music
- Length: 38:13
- Label: Private Music
- Producer: Yanni

Yanni chronology
| Optimystique (1984) | Keys to Imagination (1986) | Out of Silence (1987) |

Professional ratings
Review scores
| Source | Rating |
|---|---|
| AllMusic | 5/5 stars |

Keys to Imagination is the second studio album by Greek keyboardist and composer Yanni, released on the Private Music label in 1986.

== Background & production ==
In an interview with Cymbiosis, Yanni said that he often spent 12–15 hours a day producing the album. Yanni also stated that his favorite part about producing the album was to activate "up to six or seven [slave] keyboards" and that "the most simple sounds on Keys to Imagination are made with at least two or three keyboards."

== Critical reception ==
In a review by Backroads Music/Heartbeats, "Yanni's first Private Music release is a true masterpiece of dramatic synthesizer music. His music is lusty and brilliant, richly melodious and memorable, full of passion & life as befits his Greek heritage. One of the ultimate car-stereo albums, Yanni's flamboyant, superb style of compositions makes Keys to Imagination some of the most extravagant, hyperspace music we know." Mark Jacobs of Cymbiosis, praised the album, writing "Yanni displays sensitivity and warmth that conveys emotions to the listener while still achieving excellent recorded sound; qualities that are sadly lacking on many 'Synthesizer' albums." Jacobs cited two songs, "Looking Glass" and "Santorini", which were also included in the corresponding cassette for the magazine.

== Track listing ==
| No. | Title | Length |
|---|---|---|
| 1. | "The North Shore of Matsushima" | 5:08 |
| 2. | "Looking Glass" | 6:35 |
| 3. | "Nostalgia" | 4:27 |
| 4. | "Santorini" | 4:34 |
| 5. | "Port of Mystery" | 4:49 |
| 6. | "Keys to Imagination" | 5:13 |
| 7. | "Forgotten Yesterdays" | 3:30 |
| 8. | "Forbidden Dreams" | 3:57 |

Notes

- "Port of Mystery" is most well-known around the web as being one of the background tracks used in The "Concept Unification" installation videotape from 1989, which instructed the process that replaced The Rock-afire Explosion animatronic band at ShowBiz Pizza Place with characters from Chuck E. Cheese's due to a licensing disagreement with Creative Engineering.

== Personnel ==
- All music composed and produced by Yanni

== Production ==
Yanni recorded Keys to Imagination at his home studio in Minneapolis, Minnesota.

- Executive Producer: Peter Baumann
- Mixed by Peter Baumann, Jerry Steckling, and Yanni
- Engineer: Jerry Steckling
- Assistant Engineer: Chris Bubacz
- Mastered at Masterdisk (New York City by Bob Ludwig)
- Cover concept: Peter Baumann
- Photo-Illustration: Stafford/Wehlacz for Prima Vista Studios
- Art Direction: Dale Wehlacz
- Photography: Stafford
- Photocomposite: M. Bonner
