= We Are the World 25 for Haiti (YouTube edition) =

Single by 57 YouTube musicians
- Released: February 20, 2010
- Genre: Pop
- Length: 7:30
- Songwriters: Michael Jackson; Lionel Richie
- Producers: Lisa Lavie (collaboration); Iman Crosson (co-editing)

Music video
- "We Are the World 25 for Haiti (YouTube edition)" on YouTube

"We Are the World 25 for Haiti (YouTube edition)" is a collaborative charity song and music video produced by singer-songwriter Lisa Lavie and posted to the YouTube video sharing website to raise money for victims of the January 12, 2010 Haiti earthquake.

The video was created as a response to the celebrity remake "We Are the World 25 for Haiti" that was released eight days earlier, and is a cover of "We Are the World", the 1985 charity single produced in support of famine relief in Africa.

== Making the video ==
Lavie conceived, organized, performed in, and with fellow YouTube personality Iman Crosson, co-edited, the video for charity relief of victims of the 2010 Haiti earthquake occurring the month before.

Lavie said that she "was in the car driving and the idea to do a YouTube version of 'We Are the World' popped into [her] head." She determined how to assign portions of the song to respective YouTube singers, by "going to each singer's [YouTube] channel and listen[ing] to their voices to get a better idea of how high or low a singer could sing, if a particular part would sound better with their tonal quality, etc."

In interviews on CNN and ABC World News, Lavie explained how the video was made, given that its 57 contributors would not be performing in the same studio and generally did not even know each other. After deciding on the assignments of singers to song segments, she sent all the singers the same instrumental backing. A Radio Canada feature included a video segment of Montréal singer Heidi Jutras' vocal performance, in which she suppressed the instrumental accompaniment by using earphones. The singers then returned their respective vocal video segments to Lavie electronically, for the visual segments to be edited, and the audio to be mixed and edited, over the course of "three days [and] one sleepless night". Lavie specifically pointed out the challenge of mixing the vocal segments, made "tedious" by the segments' different sound levels, recorded in different acoustic environments (bathrooms, kitchens, bedrooms), and made by microphones of different type and quality. The resulting composite vocal and visual segments, combined with the single instrumental backing, constituted the resulting video.

The video was posted as a YouTube "video response" to the 2010 celebrity remake video on YouTube, whose last minute included a video annotation inviting such video responses. CNN's Josh Levs made special note of Lavie's use of YouTube's video annotation feature—her video continually provided successive video annotation hyperlinks to the YouTube channels of the respective contributing singers as their images appeared onscreen throughout the performance.

== Media coverage ==
Called "a massive charity collaboration for the digital age" by CTV's national television program Canada AM, within days after it was posted the video became the subject of media attention, including multiple national television features on CNN and a primetime news feature on ABC World News with Diane Sawyer.

CNN's Josh Levs reported that "a lot of people are telling us that this is better than the celebrity remake. It certainly is a sign of the times and a case of where we are right now." In the second CNN interview that was aired, CNN's Richard Lui remarked "This really is sort of—not to be trite here—we are the world," alluding to the song's title "We Are the World". Levs added that "Richard's exactly right. [...] Getting together fifty-seven singers, all over the world, [...] and they all made their own recordings, and the world therefore put these different [recordings] together."

Portion of the 2010 YouTube edition:
A sound clip from the YouTube Edition that was played in CNN features:
A crescendo performed by singers Blair Perkins, Maria Zouroudis, and Lisa Lavie

ABC's Diane Sawyer conducted a Skype interview with Lavie, asking her motivation for making the video. Lavie responded that "the way we [singers] give back is by singing." Singer Melissa Polinar explained, "We didn't really do it to compete with the remake," with Lavie emphasizing that the YouTube collaboration "reaches people in a different way."

Hours after ABC News posted the Skype interview online, the collaboration video's participants were recognized as "Persons of the Week" on the nationally televised ABC World News with Diane Sawyer to close the work week on Friday, March 19, 2010. The television broadcast paired segments of celebrity singers' performances with those of YouTube singers who sang the corresponding segments of the song, with Sawyer narrating: "He may not be Lionel Richie, but the fourteen-year old high school student in his bedroom in Perth, Australia, can sing. Instead of Al Jarreau, this manager of a California youth program. In for Michael Jackson, a community college student. Diana Ross has been replaced by a young woman in Montréal singing in her bathroom. And for Dionne Warwick, this receptionist at a hair salon in Santa Barbara." Sawyer's further explanation: "Perfect strangers, perfect harmony, making a joyful sound [...] in effect saying, we are the world, too [...] And so [for "Persons of the Week"] we choose Lisa Lavie and the singers she brought together around the globe, who proved that that anthem is not just for glittering names."

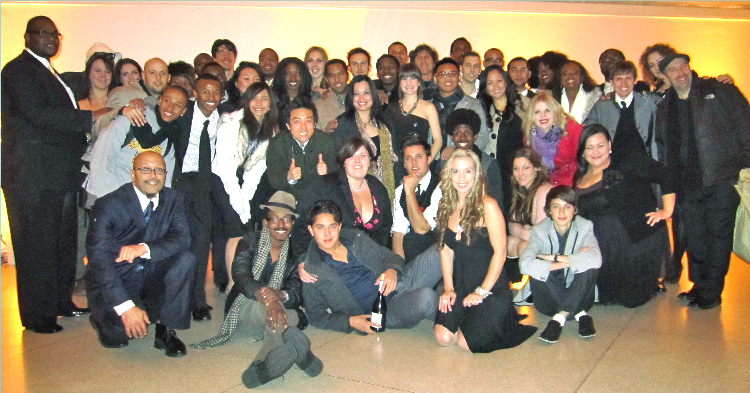
The singers performed together in person in Washington, D.C., for a private event on December 6, 2010.

The day following the ABC World News feature, CNN online posted a supplemental feature that was being broadcast on CNN International: a "YouTube sensation, a new version of the popular song that's attracted more than 1.7 million views—and not a celebrity in sight."

Three days after the ABC World News feature, USA Today characterized Lavie as a "visionary" for conceiving the "phenom" YouTube video.

A Radio Canada feature emphasized the divergent sources of the segments constituting the video, noting that some of the 57 contributors sang "in their bedroom, living room or even in their bathroom" but that the result is assez remarquable (quite remarkable).

CNN's Josh Levs explained that "the official YouTube channel of the celebrity version, is now posting this [YouTube collaboration] version there", meaning that a thumbnail photo link to the YouTube collaboration video was displayed as a "Favorite" on the YouTube channel of the We Are the World Foundation adjacent the official celebrity remake video.

== Formal recognition ==
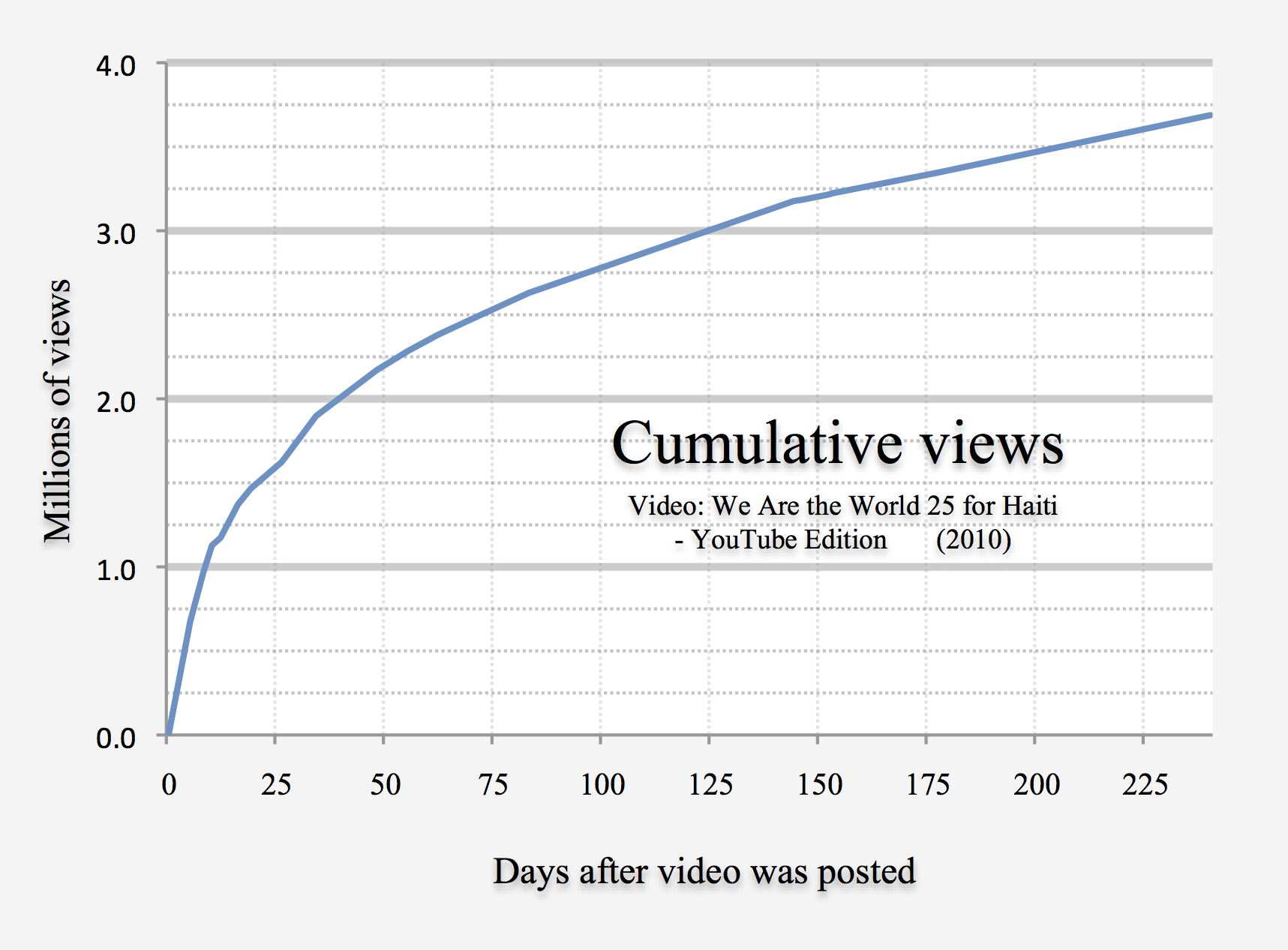
Cumulative video views over the first eight months (some points linearly interpolated)

Formal recognition of the video included:

- The video's participants were recognized as "Persons of the Week" on ABC World News with Diane Sawyer (March 19, 2010).
- CNN Newsroom's Josh Levs chose the YouTube video as the best viral video of 2010 in its "Viral Video Rewind" feature (December 26, 2010).
- The video was recognized by YouTube's official "TheYearInReview" channel in its "Moments That Defined YouTube in 2010" feature (December 2010).

== Reception by viewers ==
The video received its first half-million views on YouTube in two days, and more than 830,000 views in its first six days.

Within five months of being posted, the YouTube video had been viewed over 3.17 million times, had received almost 20,000 comments, had been "favorited" over 48,500 times, and was the seventh most highly rated YouTube Canada music video of all time. As of October 2016, the video had been viewed 6.5 million times on YouTube.

== Contributors to the video ==
Singers as recited in the order listed in the subject video's description:

- Troye Sivan
- Melissa Polinar
- Ben Sharkey
- Iann Guérin
- Bruce & Daniel
- Mishal Moore
- Ahmir
- Blair Perkins
- Lyne Sullivan
- Lois Mahalia

- Chris Cendana
- Jumoke Hill
- J Rice
- Luna Mae
- SamDaSinga
- Anhayla
- Maria Zouroudis
- Lisa Lavie
- David Choi
- Richard Rick Rose

- Nick Pitera
- AJ Rafael
- Lucas Teague
- Jessica Sanchez
- Thia Megia
- Shan Malaika
- Airto
- Emmanuelle Auger
- Laura Broad
- BeeKay

- Sheena Melwani
- Dan Talevski
- Frank Bell
- Orlando Dixon
- Iman Crosson
- JR Aquino
- Eric Arceneaux
- Stacy Dudero
- Meghan Tonjes
- James Dupre

- Heidi Jutras
- Anna Moya
- Laura Song
- Renee Thomas
- Jonnathan Molina (Jon McSingee)
- Laurence Fishman
- Nick Gardner
- Jon Cahlander
- Julie Corrigan

Non-singer credits:

- Editors: Lisa Lavie (audio editing), Iman Crosson (video editing)
- Instrumentals: Mike Kalombo
- Ending graphic: Chris Kalombo

== See also ==
- "We Are the World"
- "We Are the World 25 for Haiti"
- Charity record
- 2010 Haiti earthquake
- Crowdsourcing
- Social impact of YouTube
- Internet band
