= We Are the World 25 for Haiti =

2010 Artists for Haiti song

Single by Artists for Haiti
- Released: February 12, 2010
- Recorded: February 1, 2010
- Studio: Henson, Hollywood
- Length: 6:56 (long version); 3:25 (short version)
- Label: Interscope
- Songwriters: Michael Jackson; Lionel Richie
- Producers: Quincy Jones; Lionel Richie; RedOne; Mervyn Warren; Patti Austin; Humberto Gatica; Wyclef Jean; Rickey Minor

Artists for Haiti singles chronology
"We Are the World 25 for Haiti" (2010)	"Wavin' Flag" (2010)

Music video
- "We Are the World 25 for Haiti" on YouTube

"We Are the World 25 for Haiti" is a charity single recorded by the supergroup Artists for Haiti in 2010. It is a remake of the song "We Are the World", which was written by American musicians Michael Jackson and Lionel Richie, and was recorded by USA for Africa in 1985 to benefit famine relief in Africa. Initially, in late 2009, it had been suggested to Richie and Quincy Jones—producer of the original "We Are the World"—that a re-cut version of the song be re-released under the title "Live 25". Following the magnitude 7.0 M_{w} earthquake in Haiti in early 2010, which devastated most of the country and killed thousands of people, it was agreed that the song would be re-recorded by new artists, in the hope that it would reach a new generation and help benefit the people of Haiti.

The song was recorded in 14.5 half hours by over 80 artists on February 1, 2010. It was produced by Quincy Jones, and executively produced by Lionel Richie, and Haitian-American musician Wyclef Jean. A music video directed by Canadian filmmaker Paul Haggis was released to accompany and promote the song. The song was also recorded in the Spanish language by a Latin supergroup and was titled "Somos el Mundo". The song was directed by Emilio Estefan and his wife Gloria.

"We Are the World 25 for Haiti" is musically structured similar to "We Are the World", but includes a rap verse that was written by some of the song's hip hop artists such as will.i.am. Michael Jackson died the year before the song's release, but his material from the 1985 (original) recording sessions was incorporated into the song and music video, per the request of his mother, Katherine. His sister Janet duets with him on the song, and his nephews Taj, TJ, and Taryll—collectively known as 3T—feature on the track's chorus.

"We Are the World 25 for Haiti" was released on February 12, 2010, during the opening ceremony of the 2010 Winter Olympics, as a download by Interscope Records. The song was panned by music reviewers, with criticism focused on the song's new musical additions, as well as the choice of artists who appear on the track. However, the song was commercially successful worldwide, charting within the top 20 in several countries.

== Background ==
In 1985, "We Are the World", a song and charity single originally recorded by USA for Africa was released. It was written by American musicians Michael Jackson and Lionel Richie, and produced by Quincy Jones and Michael Omartian for the album We Are the World. The song was well received by music critics and was the recipient of several awards. The song was a worldwide commercial success, as it topped music charts throughout the world and became the fastest-selling U.S. pop single in history, as well as the first single to be certified multi-platinum by the Recording Industry Association of America. "We Are the World" was the best-selling pop single of all time until it was eclipsed by Elton John's 1997 version of "Candle in the Wind".

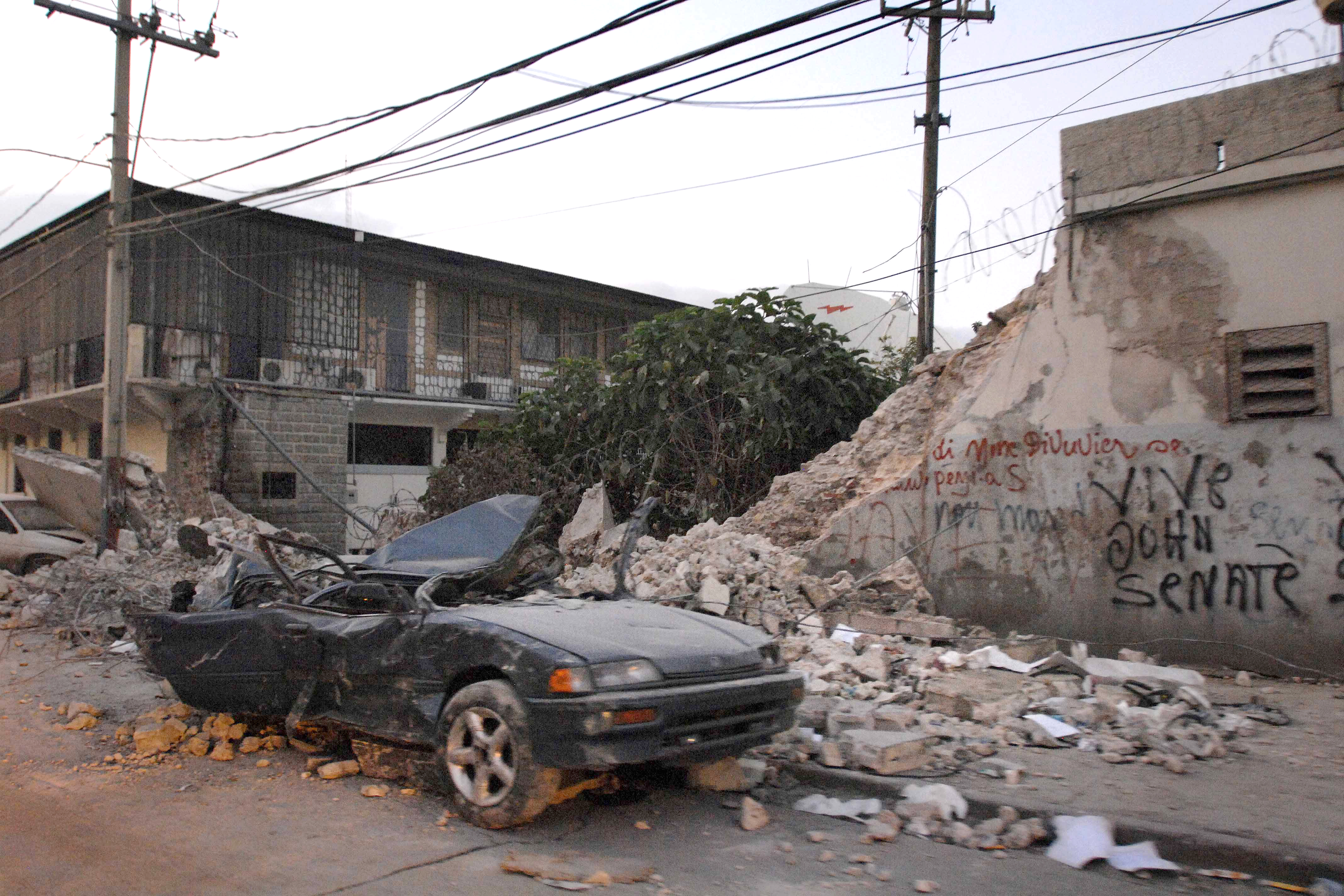
Earthquake damage in Port-au-Prince

In 2010, Haiti was struck by a magnitude 7.0 M_{w}earthquake. It was the country's most severe earthquake in over 200 years and caused widespread damage. The epicenter of the quake was just outside the Haitian capital Port-au-Prince. It has been estimated that the death toll could reach 200,000. Before the earthquake, Jones and Richie had planned to organize a re-recording of "We Are the World" on January 28, 2010 — the 25th anniversary of the original recording of the song. Randy Phillips, who was a key figure in the song being re-issued, said that "We Are The World" producer Ken Kragen had suggested to re-cut "We Are the World" and title it "Live 25". However, Lionel Richie and Jones were "very lukewarm" about the idea. Phillips commented that,

[They felt] that what happened 25 years ago was iconic and they did everything they could for Africa at that time, and they didn't feel re-cutting the song really made any sense. Basically, Lionel didn't really want to do it, and we kind of let it die by not issuing the publishing license, because Lionel owns the copyright along with Michael Jackson's estate. That was in November/December [2009]. They had gotten Visa on board as an underwriter of that effort, and I think they were going to try and premiere it at the World Cup.

However, due to the devastation caused in Haiti, these plans were postponed. Phillips said that Jones had called Lionel and said, "this is what this song is written for, as a fundraising vehicle for causes, tragedies, catastrophes like this. Why don't we take over the process, call our friends, and actually do this?" Lionel understood the urgency of Haiti, and in January 2010, it was agreed that "We Are the World" would be re-recorded to help benefit Haiti, similar to how the original recording helped famine relief in Africa. Richie commented, "Unfortunately, sometimes it takes a hit record to make someone decide to save a life. I want this song to be the battle cry again. Every once in a while, you have to wake the world up. We slept right through Katrina. If we are not a socially aware culture, we're going to fail."

== Recording ==
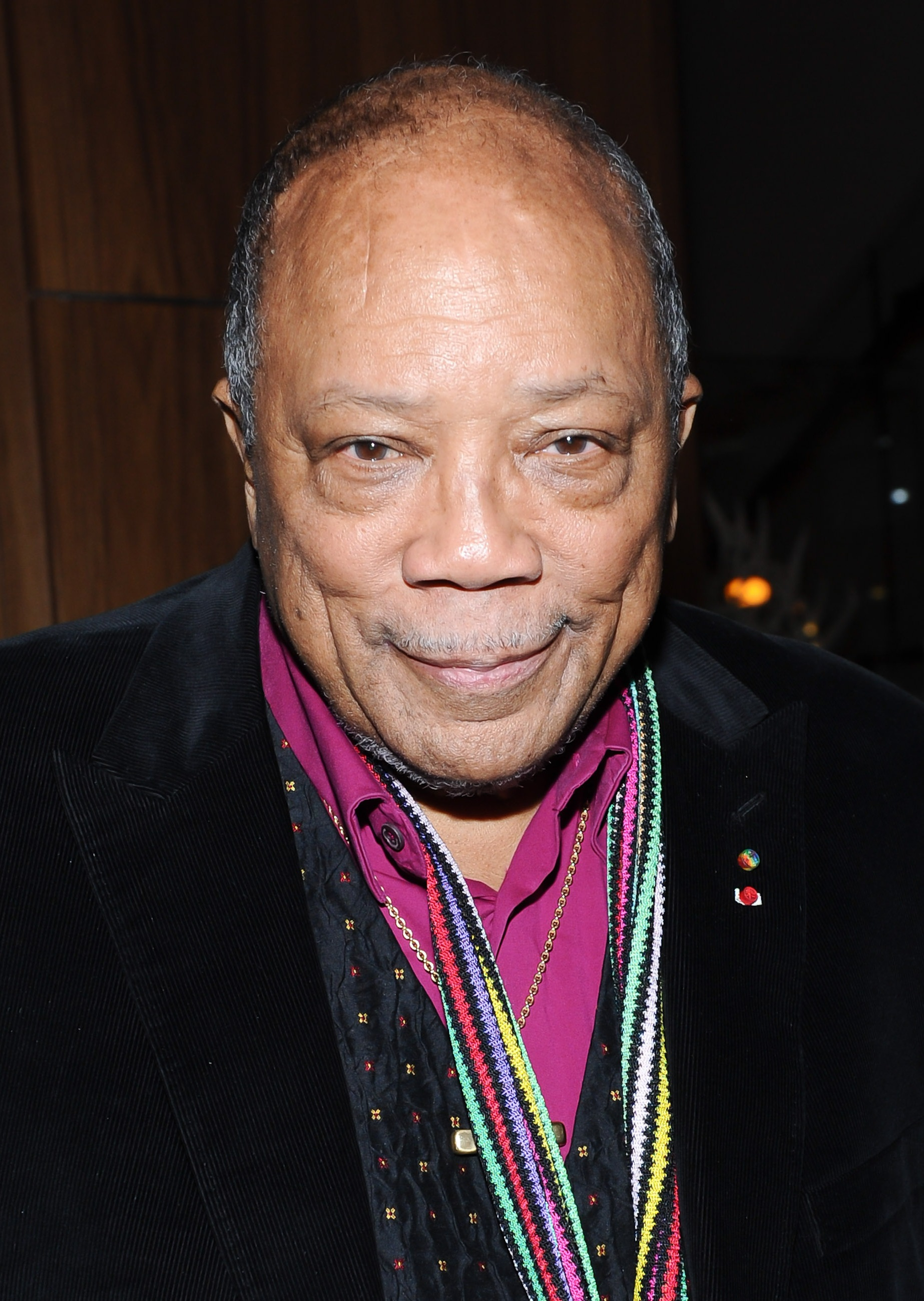
Quincy Jones was a key figure in the production and recording of "We Are the World 25 for Haiti".

The new version of the song was recorded on February 1, 2010, in a session lasting 14 hours. 85 musicians were reportedly involved in the song's recording, which was held in the same place as the original, at Henson Recording Studios (formerly known as "A&M Studios") on La Brea Avenue in Los Angeles, California. Similar to the 1985 process, some of the participating musicians were already in Los Angeles to attend an awards ceremony: the 52nd Grammy Awards. Jones said of the recording session, "It was a big challenge. It takes a serious army and serious emotional architecture. I've never seen such a diverse group of people, and they came for the right reasons." The recording process brought together diverse artists, with the oldest being 83-year-old Tony Bennett and the youngest being 9-year-old Ethan Bortnick.

The new version features updated lyrics and music, such as a rap part including LL Cool J, will.i.am, Snoop Dogg and seven others pertaining to Haiti, described as a "Greek chorus extension", which was written by will.i.am. Other writers included Kanye West, Jones and LL Cool J. Michael Jackson's sister, Janet (not in the L.A. choir session), performed a duet with her brother using archival recordings from the original version per a request from their mother, Katherine. In the official video, there is also archival footage of Michael Jackson from the original 1985 recording. Richie said that he agreed with Katherine's request, commenting, "It made me feel more secure about this. We definitely felt a void. He's the other parent [to the song]." The production team for the song included Humberto Gatica, RedOne, Mervyn Warren, Patti Austin and Rickey Minor. RedOne said that it took a week to create the new arrangement for the song. He commented that he wanted to keep the "class of the original one" and noted that he wanted to make the song "sound more now and current" while keeping the originals "whole chord progressions, the feeling and the vibe, but brought fresher sounds that are more now."

Haitian-American musician Wyclef Jean also serves as a producer. In addition, Wyclef Jean sings the first line of the second chorus in Haitian Creole. Richie said new artists were selected for the song so the song could be aimed at a new audience, commenting, "We have a familiar song that kids learn in school. Why not bring in Miley Cyrus and the Jonas Brothers and let them address the issues?" adding that "It was designed so that we wouldn't have any of the originals there, so that we could pass on the baton to the next generation". Phillips said that the producers received 80 percent of the people they wanted as recording artists for the song. In addition to Jean, Haitian actor Jimmy Jean-Louis, most famous for playing a character on NBC's Heroes, appears in the chorus.

At the time of the recording, numerous artists commented on the process, the 1985 version of the song, and co-writer Michael Jackson. "Idol" winner/singer Jordin Sparks revealed that, despite having been born four years after the release of the original, the song had a "huge impact" on her. Canadian songstress Celine Dion said that the release of the song would not only benefit the Haitian people, but also serve as a remembrance of "the passion [Michael] Jackson had for helping those in need". Lionel Richie and Quincy Jones echoed Dion's sentiments and further explained that if Jackson was alive at the time of the recording, he would have wanted to be just as involved as he had been a quarter of a century ago. According to Phillips, there was a "handful" of musicians who either declined or could not rearrange their schedules for the song's recording, including Lady Gaga, Beyoncé and country songstress Taylor Swift, who was preparing to tour in Australia at the time.

While in the recording studio, Richie and Jones' daughters (Nicole and Rashida) were in attendance.

== Artists for Haiti ==
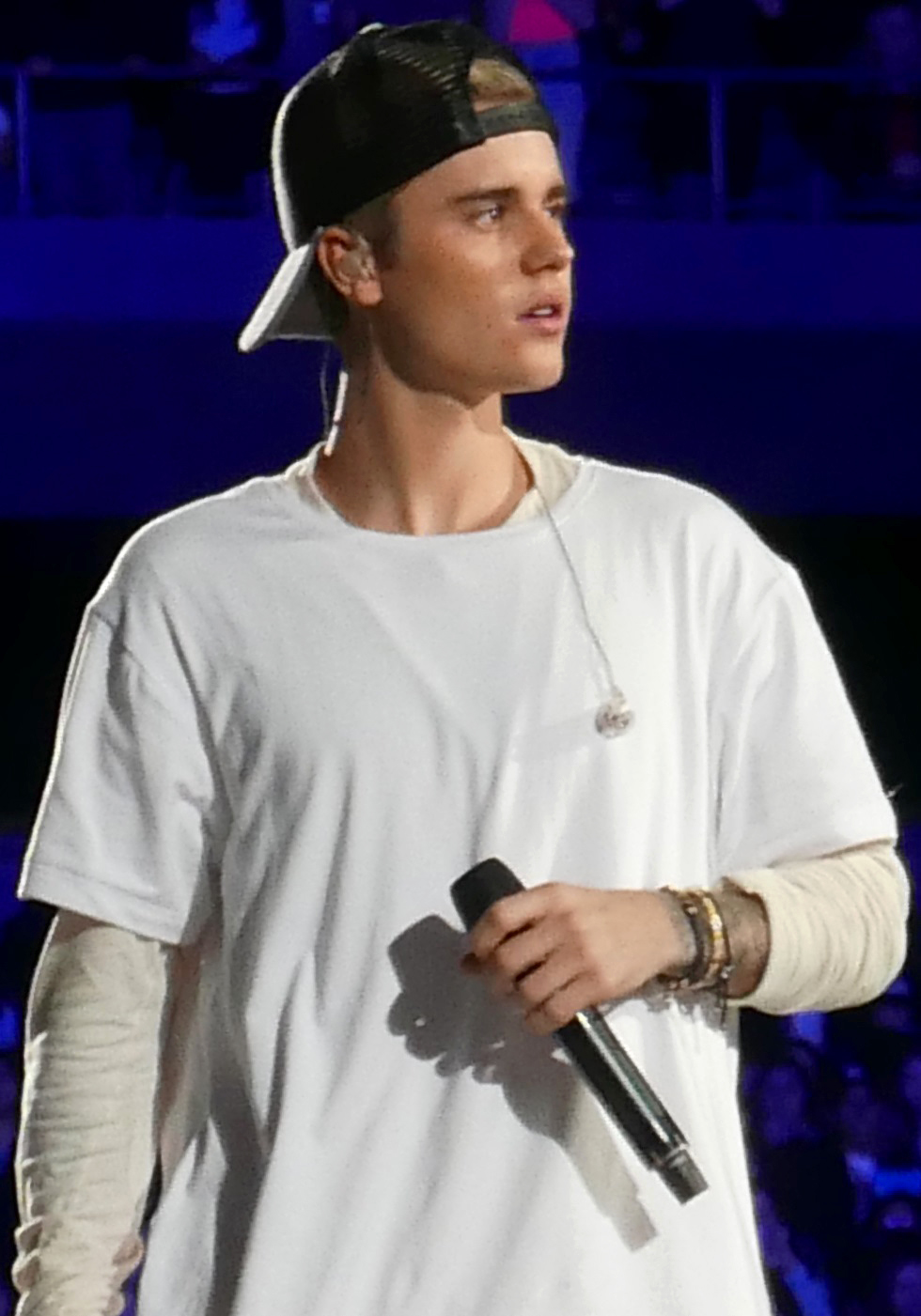
Canadian pop singer Justin Bieber (pictured) opened the song, along with Nicole Scherzinger and Jennifer Hudson.

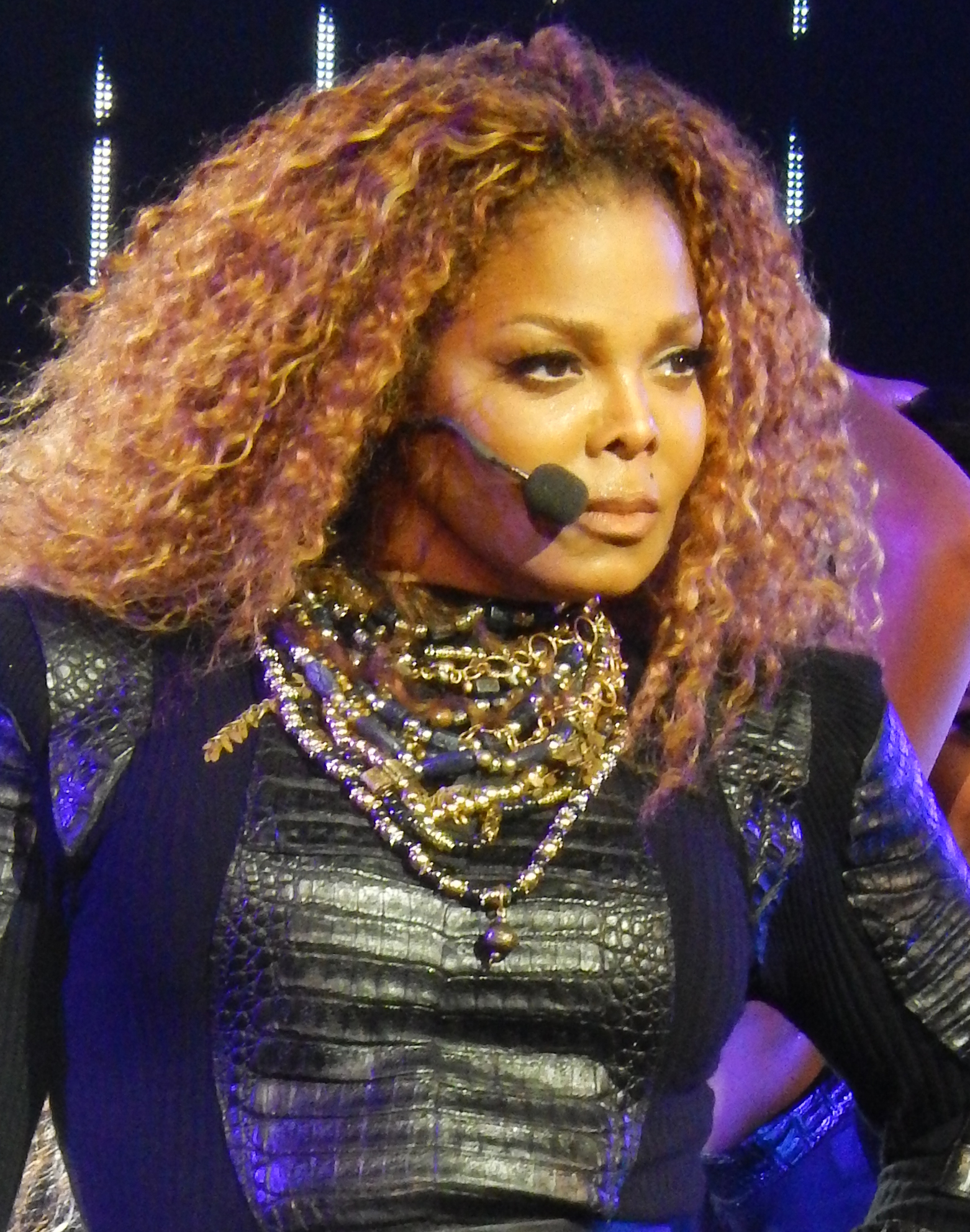
Janet Jackson (pictured) sang along with her brother, Michael Jackson, via archive footage, but not in the choir session.

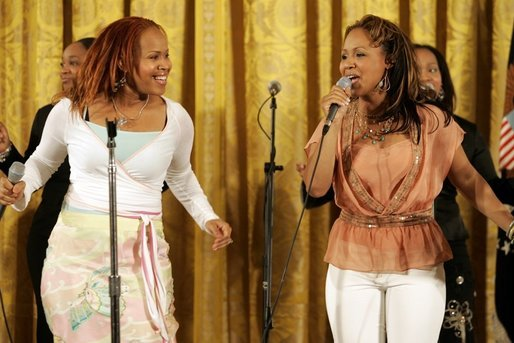
Mary Mary's voices can be clearly heard toward the end.

Conductors

- Quincy Jones
- Lionel Richie
- Mervyn Warren

Soloists (in order of appearance)

- Justin Bieber
- Nicole Scherzinger
- Jennifer Hudson
- Jennifer Nettles
- Josh Groban
- Tony Bennett
- Mary J. Blige (missing from the whole chorus)
- Toni Braxton
- Michael Jackson (stock footage)
- Janet Jackson (missing from the whole chorus)
- Barbra Streisand
- Miley Cyrus
- Enrique Iglesias
- Jamie Foxx
- Wyclef Jean
- Adam Levine
- Pink
- BeBe Winans
- Usher
- Celine Dion
- Orianthi (on guitar)
- Fergie (missing from the whole chorus)
- Nick Jonas
- Mary Mary
- T.I.
- Isaac Slade
- Carlos Santana (on guitar)
- Lil Wayne
- Akon
- T-Pain
- LL Cool J (rap)
- will.i.am (rap)
- Snoop Dogg (rap)
- Nipsey Hussle (rap)
- Busta Rhymes (rap)
- Swizz Beatz (rap)
- Iyaz (rap)
- Mann (rap)
- Kanye West (rap)

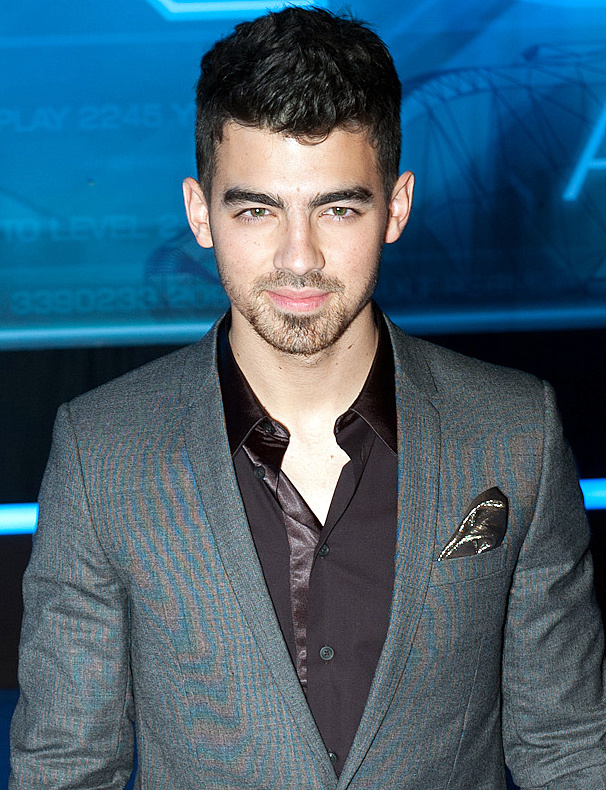
Joe Jonas, along with his brothers Nick and Kevin, sang on "We Are the World 25 for Haiti".

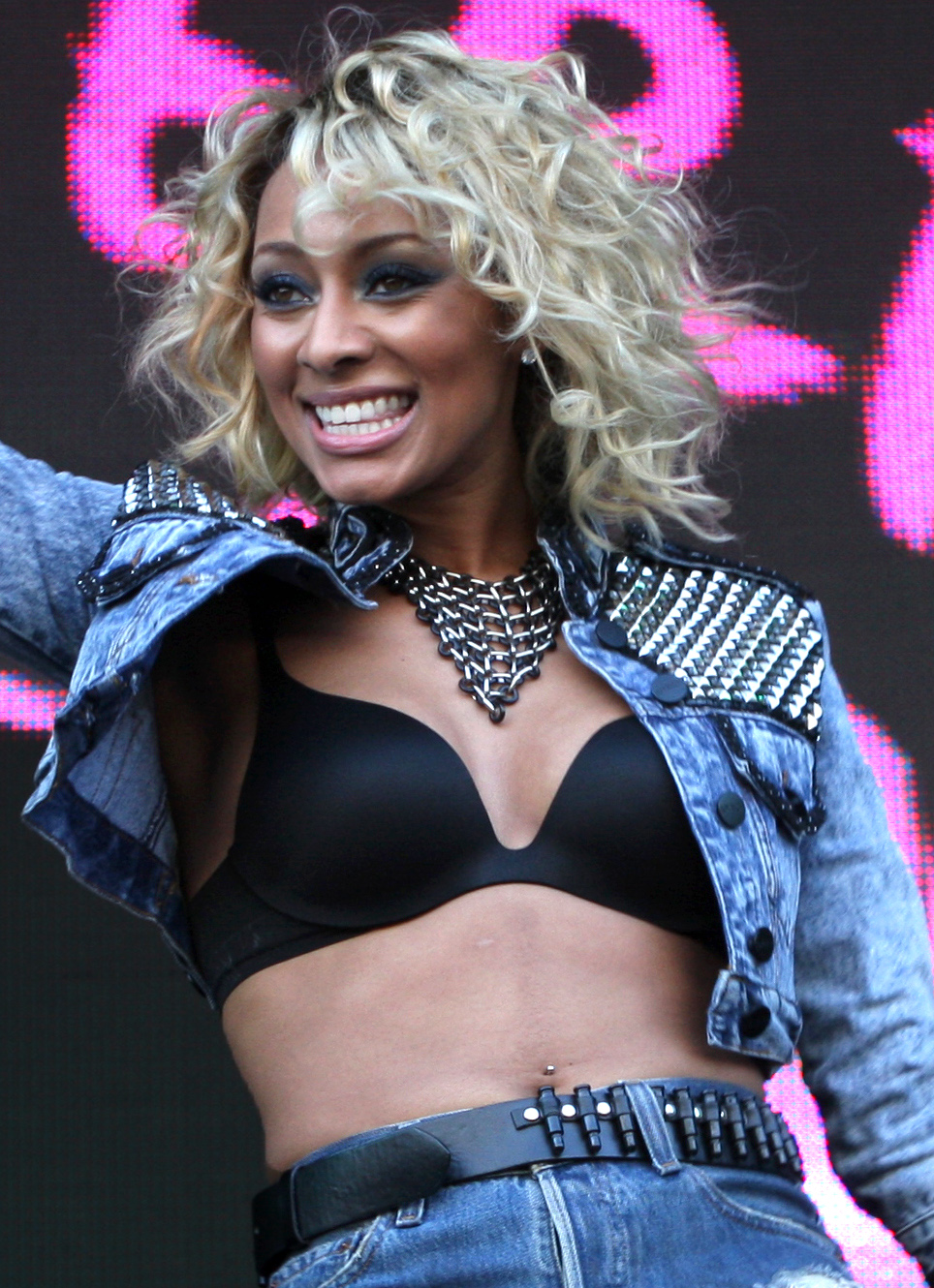
Keri Hilson sang part of the chorus.

Chorus

- Patti Austin
- Philip Bailey
- Il Volo
- Fonzworth Bentley
- Bizzy Bone
- El DeBarge
- Ethan Bortnick
- Brandy
- Jeff Bridges
- Zac Brown
- Kristian Bush
- Natalie Cole
- Harry Connick Jr.
- Nikka Costa
- Larry Dvoskin
- Faith Evans
- Melanie Fiona
- Sean Garrett
- Tyrese Gibson
- Anthony Hamilton
- Keri Hilson
- Kid Cudi
- Julianne Hough
- India Arie
- Randy Jackson
- 3T
- Bobby McFerrin
- Al Jardine
- Jimmy Jean-Louis
- Ralph Johnson
- Joe Jonas
- Nick Jonas
- Kevin Jonas
- Rashida Jones
- Gladys Knight
- Benji Madden
- Joel Madden
- Katharine McPhee
- Jason Mraz
- Mya
- Plain Pat
- Freda Payne
- A. R. Rahman
- RedOne
- Nicole Richie
- Raphael Saadiq
- Chico DeBarge
- Trey Songz
- Musiq Soulchild
- Jordin Sparks
- Robin Thicke
- Rob Thomas
- Vince Vaughn
- Mervyn Warren
- Verdine White
- Ann Wilson
- Brian Wilson
- Nancy Wilson

== Release and promotion ==
The 2010 version of "We Are the World", released under the name Artists for Haiti, debuted on the NBC television network on February 12 during their coverage of the 2010 Winter Olympics opening ceremony. When the song premiered in its paid time spot, the video was edited in length, due in part to the time spent introducing the song. However, the full-length music video was shown on NBC the following day during daytime Olympic coverage.

Similar to the marketing of "We Are the World", a music video of the song was filmed and released. The music video was directed by Academy Award-winning film director Paul Haggis. Haggis said that he finished the video 12 hours early. Haitian film students were involved in the video as part of the production crew. The official video for the song was formatted similar to the original; the video opens with the song's title with the recording artists' signatures surrounding it, as well as clips of the artists performing their parts in the recording studio and included archive footage of Michael Jackson performing his part of the song. The video was intercut with clips showing people in Haiti following the earthquake.

== Critical reviews and responses ==
"We Are the World 25 for Haiti" was panned by music critics, who lambasted its use of Auto-Tune, the choice of recording artists, and for the song's rap. Chris Richards, a writer for The Washington Post, described the song as being "horribly oversung". Richards commented that the most "disappointing" thing about the song was that "there were too few voices from the country, rock and Latin music communities." He also noted that "nobody can argue with its worthy cause" because of the song's proceeds to relief in Haiti, but remarked that the song did not have "We Are the World"'s "original thrill" due to the song's "panoply of voices". Jon Pareles, a writer for The New York Times, remarked that while the song's "Hollywood gloss" was "durable", the song has "all the pitfalls of a Hollywood remake". Parales commented that the quality of the song and performance "rises or falls on its talent pool" and criticized the choice of male musicians compared to "We Are the World"'s original male artists.

US Magazine mentioned that "this version features second-by-second unexplainable absurdities, including Justin Bieber being given the opening verse, Nicole Scherzinger and other Z-listers assigned more than one prime slot, and Wyclef Jean's incomprehensible yodeling". Maura Johnston, a writer for MTV, wrote more positively about the song, commenting favorably on the artists' performances in living up to their predecessors. "Despite the different faces, the overall feel is similar to the original's," Johnston wrote. Simon Vozick-Levinson, a writer for Entertainment Weekly, gave the song a mixed review, noting that "We Are the World 25 for Haiti" was not as good as the original: "All in all, I can't say this new 'We Are the World' measured up to the 1985 version."

Eight days after the Artists for Haiti 2010 celebrity remake was released, a "video response" to the song's official YouTube video was posted by Internet personality and singer-songwriter Lisa Lavie, and was "favorited" on the YouTube channel of the We Are The World Foundation. Lavie's "We Are the World 25 for Haiti (YouTube Edition)" excluded the rap segment and minimized the Auto-tune that were the subject of critical reviews of the celebrity version. Lavie's video, an Internet collaboration of 57 unsigned or independent YouTube musicians geographically distributed around the world, received positive reception from media, including CNN ("certainly is a sign of the times") and ABC World News with Diane Sawyer ("Persons of the Week" ... "in effect saying, We are the world, too... who proved that anthem is not just for glittering names.") Both videos link to the We Are the World Foundation for donations.

Rolling Stone said its readers "mostly agreed" with the assessment of a February 27, 2010, Saturday Night Live parody: "Recently, the music world came together to record 'We Are the World 2,' a song to raise awareness of the Haiti earthquake disaster; sadly, the song itself was a disaster." The sketch featured impersonators of stars like Lady Gaga and Willie Nelson (the latter of whom was in the original 1985 version), dubbing the parody "We Are the World 3: Raising Awareness of the 'We Are the World 2' Disaster."

== Chart performance ==
"We Are the World 25 for Haiti" debuted within the top 30 in multiple territories. "Somos El Mundo" charted at number 27 on the Spanish Singles Chart on the charts issue date February 14, 2010. The song debuted at number 17 in New Zealand on the charts issue date of February 15, 2010. "We Are the World 25 for Haiti" peaked within the top five, charting at number three in Norway on the charts issue date of February 16, 2010; the chart's position is currently the song's highest charting international territory since its release. The song debuted at number 25 in France on the issue date of February 13.

"We Are the World 25 for Haiti" charted at number two on the Billboard Hot 100, behind Kesha's "Tik Tok". "We Are the World 25 for Haiti" charted higher in its debut week than the original version, which entered the Billboard Hot 100 at number 21. According to Billboard, the song's charting position stemmed mainly from download sales, with a reported 96% of the song's charting being from such sales. Following the song's debut during the Olympics, 246 radio stations sampled the song in the United States. Radio stations in New York expressed that they would play the song frequently to raise awareness of Haitian citizens in need. Other radio stations throughout the United States echoed similar responses on the song getting airplay.

The song also sold over 267,000 downloads in three days. "We Are the World 25 for Haiti" debuted at number eight on the Canadian Hot 100 dated for February 27. The song also debuted at number six in Belgium Wallonia and Flanders, as well at debuting at number 17 in Sweden. The song also charted at number 28 in Denmark. The song entered Irish charts at number nine. In the song's second week of release in Norway, "We Are the World 25 for Haiti" moved up two spaces, topping the chart. Unlike the song's chart performance in territories like Norway, the song dropped four places on the Billboard Hot 100 to sixth place and stayed in the charts for only five weeks more.

== Track listing ==
Long version
No.	Title	Length
1.	"We Are the World 25 for Haiti"	6:57

Short version
No.	Title	Length
1.	"We Are the World 25 for Haiti"	3:25

== Chart history ==
=== Weekly charts ===
Chart (2010)	Peak position
Australia (ARIA)	18
Belgium (Ultratop 50 Flanders)	1
Belgium (Ultratop 50 Wallonia)	1
Canada (Canadian Hot 100)	7
Denmark (Tracklisten)	10
France (SNEP) Download Charts	7
Ireland (IRMA)	9
Italy (FIMI)	10
Luxembourg Digital Songs (Billboard)	2
New Zealand (Recorded Music NZ)	8
Norway (VG-lista)	1
Spain (Promusicae)	15
Sweden (Sverigetopplistan)	5
UK Singles (OCC)	50
US Billboard Hot 100	2

=== Year-end charts ===
Chart (2010)	Position
Belgium (Ultratop 50 Wallonia)	47

== See also ==
- "Somos El Mundo 25 Por Haiti"
- "We Are the World 25 for Haiti (YouTube edition)"
