= Social impact of YouTube =

Logo of YouTube since June 2024

The biggest and the smallest stage

Some have called (YouTube) the biggest and the smallest stage. The most public place in the world, from the privacy from our own homes: YouTube has been used for many things: a political soapbox, a comedian's stage, a religious pulpit, a teacher's podium, or just a way to reach out to the next door neighbor or across the world. To people we love, to people we want to love, or people we don't even know.

— Michael Wesch, cultural anthropologist
"An Anthropological Introduction to YouTube"
Presentation to the Library of Congress

The American online video sharing and social media platform YouTube has had social impact in many fields, with some individual videos of the site having directly shaped world events. It is the world's largest video hosting website and second-most-visited website according to both Alexa Internet and Similarweb, and used by 81% of U.S. adults.

Constituting one of the world's most used search engines, YouTube allows distribution of content. Worldwide video access has innovation by enabling geographically distributed individuals to build upon each other's work.

YouTube has facilitated engagement between institutions and individuals, such as between universities and prospective students, and between businesses and employees. Also, some YouTube videos increase awareness of social issues (such as bullying, suicide and LGBT issues), allow broadened social contact (especially important for the elderly or mobility-impaired), and overcome stereotypes of minorities and minority viewpoints. However, other videos have included potentially harmful content, such as those triggering audiences, inducing self-harm, or inspiring additional bullying or suicides. Further, the website's recommendation algorithm has been found to recommend harmful content to children, and has promoted dangerous practices such as the Tide Pod challenge.

YouTube has become an important "visual journalism" platform, both for conventionally produced content from established news organizations and for citizen eyewitness contributions. Certain independent or alternative news organizations have established YouTube channels that reach a wider audience than traditional broadcast television.

YouTube has promoted democracy through free expression of individual political views, for example enabling Arab Spring protest videos to transcend national boundaries, causing certain regimes to censor or ban the website. YouTube has affected conventional politics, becoming even more important than direct mail in political campaigning, with politicians and governments using the website to directly engage citizens and promote policies. However, its recommendation algorithm has been shown to recommend extremist content, especially far-right and conspiracy propaganda, leading to claims that YouTube has been used as a tool for political radicalization. Concurrently, the website has been criticized for inadequately policing against false or misleading content.

YouTube streaming data (video views) has been used to gauge consumer opinion for marketing decisions. Celebrities and large companies, especially major music labels, have used YouTube as a focused advertising tool for targeted mass marketing and audience growth by placing banner ads and by contracting with video producers for embedded-product marketing. Conversely, individuals have partnered with advertisers to grow their own audiences, the "Partner Program" enabling individual content creators to monetize videos and even earn livelihoods directly from posting content, with top earners exceeding $30–50 million per year.

== Effects on culture ==
=== Education and proliferation of knowledge ===
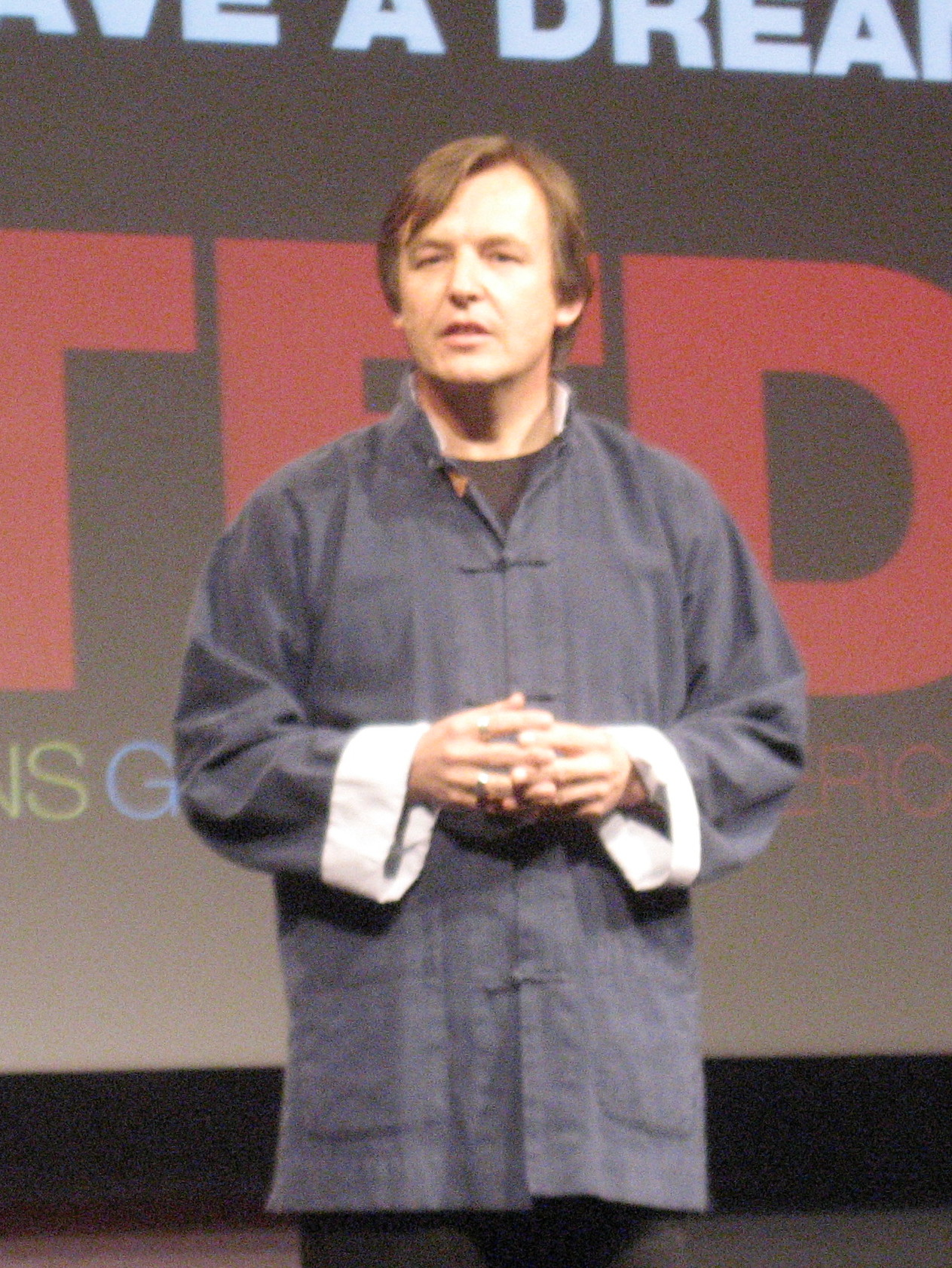
TED curator Chris Anderson asserted in 2010 that video contributors may be about to launch "the biggest learning cycle in human history".

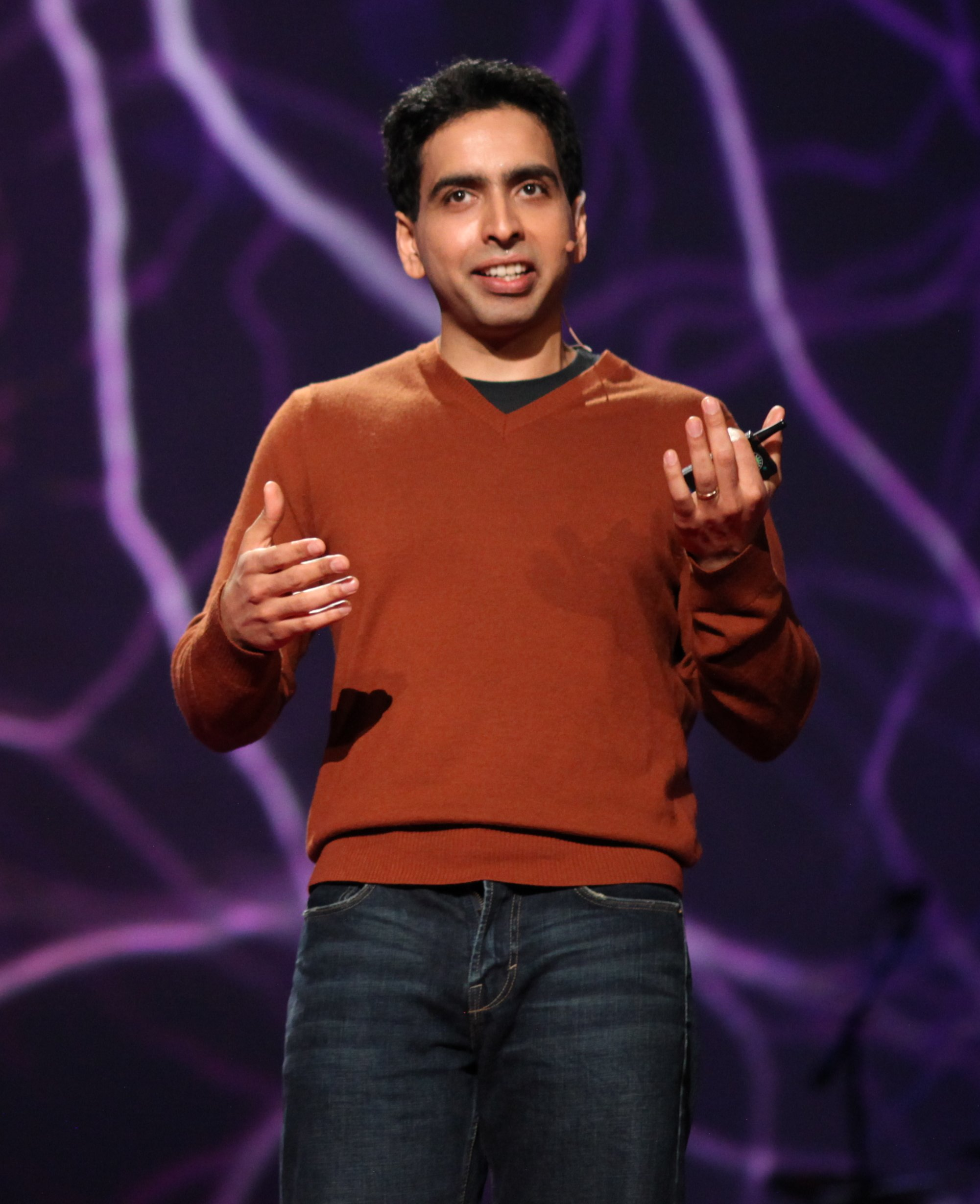
Salman Khan speaks at TED 2011 about the Khan Academy, which began on YouTube and became what was called "the largest school in the world".

In his 2010 TED Talk on crowd-accelerated innovation, TED curator Chris Anderson preliminarily noted that human brains are "uniquely wired" to decode high-bandwidth video, and that unlike written text, face-to-face communication of the type that online videos convey has been "fine-tuned by millions of years of evolution." Referring to several YouTube contributors, Anderson asserted that "what Gutenberg did for writing, online video can now do for face-to-face communication," that it's not far-fetched to say that online video will dramatically accelerate scientific advance, and that video contributors may be about to launch "the biggest learning cycle in human history."

Khan Academy founder Salman Khan, a former hedge fund analyst, grew YouTube video tutoring sessions for his cousin in 2006 into what Forbes' Michael Noer called "the largest school in the world"—a non-profit with ten million students and a reported $7 million annual operating budget (2012). By the end of 2013, Khan Academy's network of YouTube channels grew to 26,000 no-fee videos that collectively had been viewed 372 million times. Noer reasoned that technology had finally become poised to disrupt how people learn, given the advent of widespread broadband, low costs to create and distribute content, rapidly proliferating mobile devices, a shift in social norms to accept the efficacy of online learning and a generation of tech-savvy people willing to embrace it, with students watching lectures and working on their own schedule at their own pace.

Certain public school systems, non-profits, and charter schools use YouTube videos of outstanding educators in the training and professional development of teachers.

About 2,500 TED video lectures—delivery of which having been described by technology journalist Steven Levy as "an aspirational peak for the thinking set"—have collectively been viewed almost 250 million times on YouTube's "TEDtalksDirector" channel's network.

At a more micro level, individuals use YouTube to carry "how to" videos sharing their knowledge in areas such as cosmetics, and companies such as Ford Models use "how-to" videos to build their brands.

Studies by public health researchers have expressed concern about the impact of healthcare information available on YouTube, citing the potential harm to patients if inaccurate or dubious claims are presented as facts.

==== Searchable information repository ====
Beyond being what a Forrester Research analyst characterized as the largest video platform on the globe, as of January 2012 YouTube was also the world's second most popular search engine. However, YouTube keyword searches are confined to metadata—video titles and labels—rather than the video content itself.

=== Spurring innovation through distributed communities ===
In the year following YouTube's 2005 launch, some early video creators gained large viewing audiences, while others created small, tight communities among mutual watchers. In 2010 TED curator Chris Anderson described a phenomenon by which geographically distributed individuals in a certain field share their independently developed skills in YouTube videos, thus challenging others to improve their own skills, and spurring invention and evolution in that field. Legion of Extraordinary Dancers producer Jon M. Chu described "a whole global laboratory online" in which "kids in Japan are taking moves from a YouTube video created in Detroit, building on it within days and releasing a new video, while teenagers in California are taking the Japanese video and remixing it with a Philly flair to create a whole new dance style in itself." Such fields include dance and music, with Chu saying the Internet was causing dance to evolve, and journalist Virginia Heffernan calling certain music videos "a portal into a worldwide microculture".

Originally posted anonymously by a guitarist seeking suggestions on his playing, a 2005 YouTube cover of the "Canon Rock" adaptation of Pachelbel's Canon received millions of views and spawned hundreds of imitators in "a process of influence, imitation and inspiration". Journalist Virginia Heffernan asserted in The New York Times that such videos have "surprising implications" not only for YouTube, but also for the dissemination of culture and even the future of classical music.

YouTube has provided inventors an audience for market testing their concepts, and a platform for disseminating innovations more quickly and more widely than writing papers or speaking at conferences. Collaborative "meetings", a global online equivalent of the Homebrew Computer Club, take place virtually, via video.

Three years after Google purchased YouTube and larger production companies had begun to dominate, a New York Times Magazine journalist said the website was "still incubating novel forms of creative expression and cultivating new audiences" as amateurs continued to create "microgenres" serving niche audiences, collectively creating what she described as an "art scene".

=== Collaboration and crowdsourcing ===
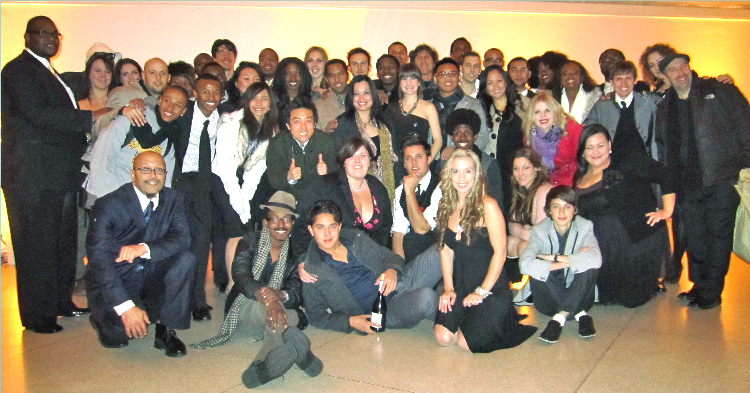
Some of the 57 contributors to Lisa Lavie's charity cyber-collaboration video "We Are the World 25 for Haiti (YouTube edition)", shown here after subsequently performing on the same stage

In projects such as the YouTube Symphony Orchestra and The Legion of Extraordinary Dancers, geographically distributed artists were selected based on their individual online video auditions, and assembled on the same stage to perform, respectively, at Carnegie Hall (2009) and at the Academy Awards ceremonies (2010).

A further step is to mix geographically distributed performances into a single work, without the performers ever physically meeting each other. Like-minded or compatibly talented individuals have used Internet communication to overcome geographic separation to create crowdsourced YouTube videos to encourage donations, such as Lisa Lavie's 57-contributor charity collaboration video "We Are the World 25 for Haiti (YouTube edition)" to benefit victims of the 2010 Haiti earthquake. The Tokyo Times noted J Rice's "We Pray for You" YouTube video, benefitting victims of the 2011 Tōhoku earthquake and tsunami, as an example of a trend to use such crowdsourcing for charitable purposes.

The 2011 film Life in a Day, a feature-length YouTube-partnered documentary comprising scenes selected from 4,500 hours of amateur video footage from 80,000 submitters, was the first crowdsourced, user-generated film to be shown in cinemas. Director Kevin Macdonald explained that the film "wouldn't have been possible pre-Internet, specifically pre-YouTube".

=== Broadening awareness of social issues ===
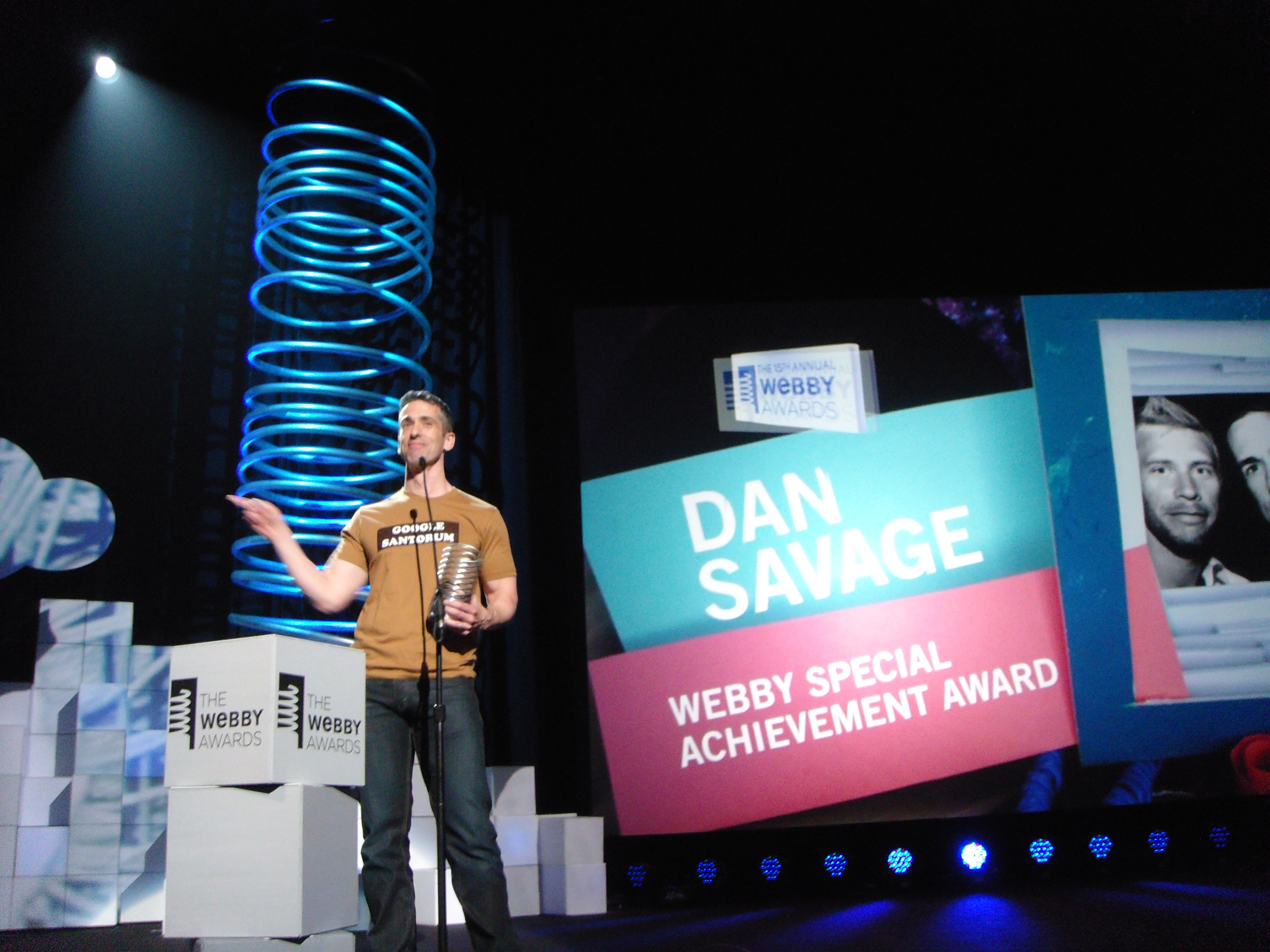
Journalist Dan Savage receives a Webby Special Achievement Award in 2011 for his anti-bullying It Gets Better Project, which started on YouTube and drew video responses from the highest levels of government.

The anti-bullying It Gets Better Project expanded from a single YouTube video directed to discouraged or suicidal LGBT teens. Within weeks, hundreds of "It Gets Better" response videos were uploaded to the project by people of various levels of celebrity, and, with two months, by U.S. President Barack Obama, White House staff, and several cabinet secretaries. In addition to "flashcard" testimonials by bullying victims and adults' encouragement videos, anti-bullying PSAs have taken the form of YouTube music videos; parenting author Rosalind Wiseman said the creators of one such video, Ahmir's YouTube cover of "Perfect", could "tell (the so-called experts) how it's done."

Fifteen-year-old Amanda Todd's video, titled "My story: Struggling, bullying, suicide, self harm" and posted to YouTube the month before her suicide, became what the National Post called an "international sensation" after her death. The resulting extensive media coverage was controversial: though psychologists say there is value in airing related mental health questions, certain headline-grabbing coverage is thought by some possibly to inspire "clusters" of additional suicides. In addition to strong public reaction, legislative action was undertaken almost immediately to study the prevalence of bullying and form a national anti-bullying strategy.

YouTube personalities have used their celebrity status for charitable purposes, such as Tyler Oakley's outspoken support of and raising of tens of thousands of dollars for The Trevor Project, an organization for crisis and suicide prevention for LGBTQ youth.

The 2006 Bus Uncle video, recording a man's tirade against a fellow Hong Kong bus passenger who had asked him to speak more quietly on his cellphone, inspired a significant amount of social and cultural analysis. Local experts characterized the video as "catching the collective emotional pulse" of a crowded and stressful city in which people do not normally say how they feel.

=== Effects on values and standards ===
YouTube was included in Entertainment Weekly's "100 Greatest" list in 2009—though with the ironic praise, "a safe home for piano-playing cats, celeb goof-ups, and overzealous lip-synchers since 2005". In 2010, citing YouTube's then most viewed video Charlie Bit My Finger as an example of viewers not choosing what might have traditionally been judged "quality", Advertising Age journalist Michael Learmonth asserted that for information and entertainment the Internet had both killed and redefined the concept of quality. Learmonth reasoned that online journalism, being based on "greatly diminished economics and expectations", is intrinsically inaccurate and a de-professionalized version of offline journalism. In this vein, GroupM's CEO was quoted as saying there seemed to be a bigger premium on popularity than authority. Concerning these phenomena, the CEO of Associated Content (now Yahoo! Voices) said that people are increasingly comfortable receiving information from unfamiliar sources, and that quality had come to revolve around properly timed usefulness rather than being decided by professionals. Conversely, in 2012 the head of YouTube's programming strategy Ben Relles was quoted as saying that most viral videos were scripted productions that did not go viral serendipitously, and that "the poetics of YouTube favor authenticity over production values."

=== Personal connection and identity ===
In 2008, cultural anthropologist Michael Wesch observed that both YouTube vloggers and their viewers can experience a profound sense of connection, the distance and anonymity between them enabling them to avoid the constraining effect of conventional social norms (such as not staring at people). This sense of connection is said to occur in an era of "cultural inversion" in which we are driven to express our individualism and independence, yet still value community and relationships.

In 2011, Willow Scobie asserted the anthropological significance of YouTube and noted evidence of a "transformative experience" for some people, and that some could actually identify as being a "YouTuber".

=== Disruption of conventional media ===
Discussing music streaming services, music critic Chris Richards wrote in The Washington Post that YouTube, "a site that never really intended to become a music platform(,) accidentally became our most visited, most variegated music platform". In Richards' view, it achieved this viewership by "situat(ing) a piece of music, and the listening experience, in the greater context of all media, all experience"—referring to the variety of content encountered through its "Up Next" algorithm. Crediting YouTube's mobile accessibility, vast library size, visuality, portability, on-demand convenience, and engagement through comments, Richards called the website's billion+ music visitors per month "a bizarre triumph for a company so eager to obsolesce our televisions".

Within twenty years of its founding, YouTube had disrupted traditional television with its billions of videos catering to niche interests. In the fourth quarter of 2023, 16 of the top 30 audio podcasts were available as YouTube videos—more than twice the fraction of a year earlier. In 2025, in the US, more people watched YouTube on their televisions than Disney+, Prime Video and Netflix. Also by 2025, YouTube had become the second most popular search engine (after Google) and the second most popular social network (after Facebook).

=== Negative effects on viewers ===
Videos that frighten or excite children were found to receive the most views, often because of algorithm-driven demand measurement and automated editorial oversight, automated oversight that is thought to be inadequately effective and easy to avoid. Very young children tend to watch the same video many times and were thus found to be particular vulnerable, including to videos with bizarre, sexual, scatological or violent content. Researchers, parents and consumer groups say that, despite YouTube's years of vowing to police inappropriate content, the website's recommendation algorithm and default autoplay feature continue to reach children with "violent imagery, drug references, sexually suggestive sequences and foul, racially charged language", making parental monitoring impractical. Separately, in September 2019 YouTube's owner Google agreed to pay a $170 million fine—exceeding the previous $5.7 million FTC record though only 1.7% of Google's profit for the quarter—for illegally collecting personal information from children without parental consent, in violation of the Children's Online Privacy Protection Act (COPPA).

Some YouTube content creators have used the website's algorithm to gain more views at the cost of endangering viewers' physical safety, such as the Tide Pod challenge Internet meme that dared teenagers to consume pods containing the laundry detergent.

== Journalism ==
A Pew Research Center study found that a new kind of "visual journalism" had developed, in which citizen eyewitnesses and established news organizations share in content creation. The study found that while 51% of the most watched YouTube news videos were produced by news organizations, 39% of the news pieces originally produced by a news organization were posted by users. Pew's deputy director observed that news reporting on YouTube was opening up the flow of information and forging new areas of cooperation and dialogue between citizens and news outlets. Though YouTube executives denied the company itself intends to get into content creation, YouTube's news manager described it as a "catalyst" for creating new original content by developing partnerships with news organizations, the Pew Research study concluding that the website was "becoming an important platform by which people acquire news."

Independent or alternative news organizations, such as Baltimore-based The Real News, Qatar-based Al Jazeera English, or Russian TV Rain have established channels on YouTube that reach a wider audience than traditional broadcast television.

In July–August 2012, YouTube provided the first live-stream coverage of the events in the Summer Olympic Games. In August 2012 YouTube formed its "Elections Hub" that streamed speeches from American national political party conventions and featured content from eight major news organizations.

== Direct effect on world events ==
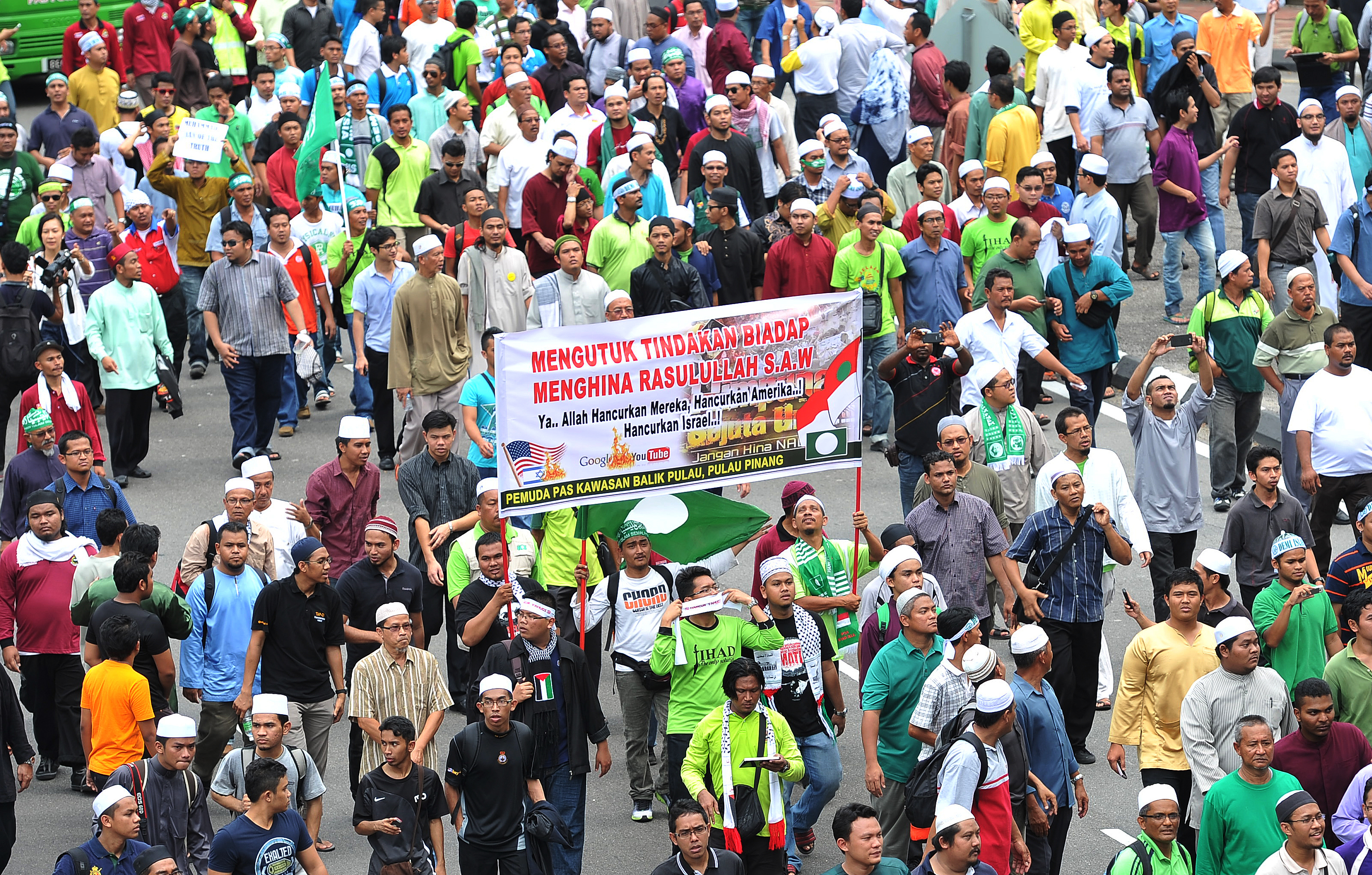
The privately produced YouTube video Innocence of Muslims (2012) spurred protests and related anti-American violence internationally, such as this demonstration in Kuala Lumpur, Malaysia.

The YouTube video Innocence of Muslims (2012), produced privately within the United States, was interpreted by some Muslims as blasphemous in its mocking of Muhammad, and spurred protests and related anti-American violence internationally despite official condemnation of the video by U.S. government officials.

A cellphone camera video showing the 2009 death of Iranian student Neda Agha-Soltan during the 2009 Iranian presidential election protests received a George Polk Award in journalism, the first bestowed to an anonymous work. The video became a symbol of the Iranian opposition movement, the Polk Award's curator saying that the video "became such an important news element in and of itself". The award panel said it wanted to acknowledge the role of ordinary citizens, especially in scenarios in which professional reporters are restricted.

Videos of al-Qaeda militant Anwar al-Awlaki, including some urging attacks against the United States, were posted to YouTube. Though YouTube removed those videos that incited terrorism in response to appeals from U.S. Congressmen, it is thought that Awlaki's videos were in part responsible for inspiring certain viewers to violent acts.

A United Arab Emirates (UAE) court in 2013 sentenced eight individuals to as much as one year imprisonment for uploading a mock documentary YouTube video spoofing a supposed "gangsta culture" of UAE teens, but portraying the teens as mild-mannered, for example, throwing sandals as weapons. The government said the individuals "defamed the UAE society's image abroad" and cited a 2012 UAE cybercrimes law prohibiting use of information technology in a way "liable to endanger state security." The imprisonments provoked criticism from the Emirates Centre for Human Rights, which asserted the case exposed the country's problems with due legal process and restrictive Internet laws.

"Propaganda operatives" from terrorist organization Islamic State of Iraq and the Levant (IS, Daesh or ISIS) published propaganda and recruiting videos on YouTube, causing law enforcement agencies to work closely with social media companies to take countermeasures, including quickly removing gruesome content or violations of anti-terror laws, and suspending user accounts. A number of government agencies have been granted YouTube "trusted flagger" status to prioritize the agencies' reporting of dangerous or illegal content. Faced with these anti-terrorist countermeasures, one propaganda operative acknowledged in September 2014 that his followers' online efforts were "a disaster."

== Engagement between people and institutions ==
=== Engagement between citizens and government ===
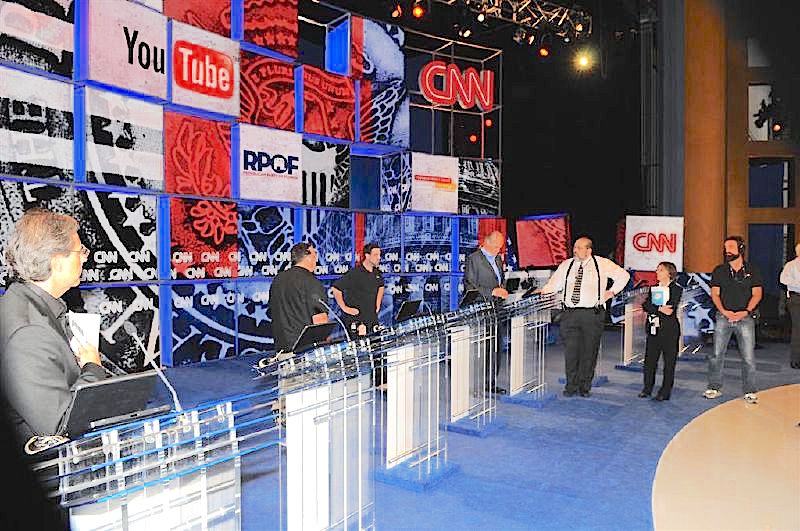
In the 2007 CNN/YouTube presidential debates, candidates responded to questions submitted by ordinary people via YouTube video.

In at least the CNN/YouTube presidential debates (2007) and the NBC News YouTube Democratic candidates debate (2016), ordinary people and prominent YouTubers submitted questions to U.S. presidential candidates via YouTube video. Remarking that YouTube "put power in the hands of the camera holder", New York Times journalist Katharine Q. Seelye noted that because visual images can be more powerful than written words, videos have the potential to elicit emotional responses from the candidates and frame the election in new ways. Quoting a techPresident co-founder as saying that Internet video was changing the political landscape, Seelye wrote that most U.S. presidential campaigns were now fully engaged with video, with seven of the sixteen 2008 presidential candidates announcing their campaigns on YouTube. Campaigns allowed their videos to be embedded, critiqued, and recut per YouTube's technical features, thus surrendering control over the context of their videos. Though YouTube had first been presented as a way for campaigns to engage youthful voters, the videos were said soon after the 2008 election to have profoundly affected popular perception across other demographics and had become more important than direct mail.

Though television advertising still dominated how 2012 U.S. political campaigns initially reached voters—with only about 10% of advertising budgets being directed at the Internet—the YouTube platform provided quick communication and engaged people in a "one-click" approach to actively participate by volunteering, sharing content or pledging financial support. The director of the Center for Technology Innovation at the Brookings Institution said that individuals' sharing videos through trusted networks adds credibility over conventional direct ads.

Various government entities, such as the U.S. Congress and the Vatican in early 2009, began to use YouTube to directly disseminate information by video. The White House's official YouTube channel was found in 2012 to be the seventh top news organization producer on YouTube. Barack Obama's U.S. presidency, the first to begin (2009) after YouTube gained popularity, was quickly noted for its "overall virtuosity on the visual Internet" and "nonstop cinematography".

Paradoxically, the burgeoning presence of digital media did not coarsen public figures' behavior, but instead by 2009 appeared to have induced a cautious reserve attributed to a mindful avoidance of possible mockery by video parodists; "avoiding a YouTube moment" had become part of the political vernacular before the website's tenth birthday (2015). Whereas politicians became more known and accessible than a decade previously, politicians also learned to by-pass undesirable questions from traditional media by using self-produced videos to communicate with the electorate directly. Extensive advance vetting of politicians' public utterances led The Washington Post's Chris Cillizza to assert in 2015 that "spontaneity in politics has been killed—or at least mortally wounded—by YouTube."

In November 2013, a video, "There is a Way Forward", was posted to the YouTube channel of Iranian foreign minister Mohammad Javad Zarif as part of an apparent attempt to "set the tone and context" of ensuing nuclear power limitation negotiations between Iran and six world powers. Zarif's video was said to be part of an attempt to reach the West, as Iran itself had blocked Iranian residents' YouTube access.

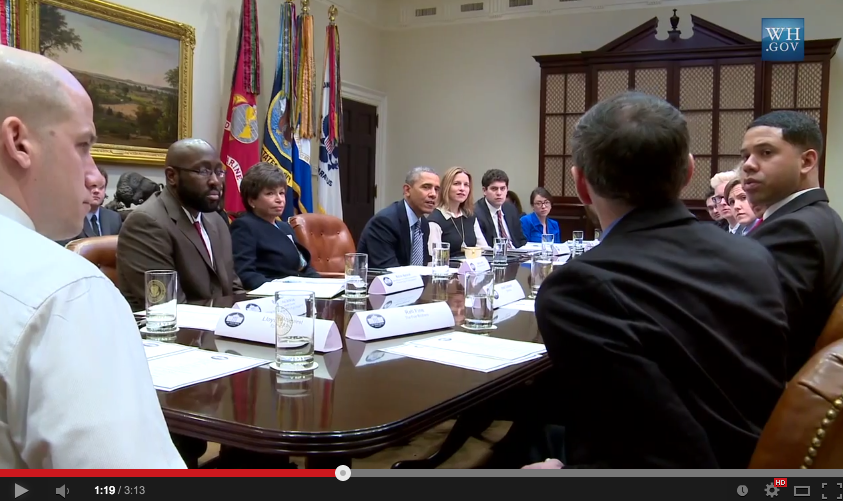
U.S. President Obama met with leading YouTube content creators to start a dialogue about health insurance awareness and enrollment, as well as anti-bullying, education, and economic opportunity.

In February 2014, U.S. President Obama held a meeting at the White House with prominent YouTube content creators. Though promoting awareness of the Affordable Care Act ("Obamacare") was a main topic, the meeting more generally concerned ways in which government could connect with the younger "YouTube Generation". Whereas YouTube's inherent ability to enable presidents to directly connect with average citizens was noted, the YouTube content creators' new media savvy was perceived necessary to better cope with the website's distracting content and fickle audience. The White House meeting followed a healthcare exchange's December 2013 social media campaign to encourage young adults to obtain Obamacare-compliant health insurance, the campaign including Obama impersonator Iman Crosson's YouTube music video spoof. Obama followed in January 2015 by arranging to be interviewed by three of the most popular YouTube content creators in what a White House spokesman described as "an effort to engage as many Americans as possible in various venues".

Video public service announcements, such as those promoting water conservation, have been produced both by governmental entities and in school competitions.

In 2021, the Biden administration paid as much as $1,000 per month to influencers who promote COVID-19 vaccines to their followers, consistent with a 2018 study finding that young people are more likely to trust advice of their favorite content creator than a mainstream celebrity.

=== Engagement between individuals and private institutions ===
Institutions, including old-line law firms, use video to attract new talent in members of what is called the "YouTube generation"—creating videos and websites having the look and feel of YouTube to persuade prospects that the firms are young-thinking. Such videos are said to express the firms' personality better than reciting traditional law firm credentials. Similarly, hundreds of U.S. and Canadian universities have a presence on YouTube, and universities such as Princeton University have used YouTube videos as a way of communicating with prospective students, including videos containing admissions officers' tips and expectations, the university's learning expectations, sample lectures, and student descriptions of campus social life. Conversely, institutions such as Tufts University invited student applicants to submit videos as part of their application package.

== Personal expression ==
=== Broadened expression of political ideas ===
YouTube was awarded a 2008 George Foster Peabody Award, the website being described as a Speakers' Corner that "both embodies and promotes democracy." A 2012 Pew Research Center study explicitly found it noteworthy that protest was the second most popular topic on YouTube, but was not among the leading subjects on conventional network evening news.

In the Arab Spring (2010- ), protestors uploaded videos showing protests and political commentary, with sociologist Philip N. Howard describing a "cascade effect" through which personal content, more so than centralized ideology, spilled over national boundaries through social networks. Howard quoted an activist's succinct description that organizing the political unrest involved "us(ing) Facebook to schedule the protests, Twitter to coordinate, and YouTube to tell the world." Numerous national governments have censored or banned YouTube to limit public exposure to content that may ignite social or political unrest, to prevent violations of ethics- or morality-based law, or to block videos mocking national leaders or historical figures.

When governments of countries such as Syria began to examine user-generated YouTube videos to identify and arrest dissidents, in 2012 YouTube provided a tool by which uploaders may blur subjects' faces to protect their identities.

In countries with more restrictive political and social environments, performers such as comedians in Saudi Arabia have found freer speech to be acceptable through their YouTube channels. Similarly, Bassem Youssef—formerly a physician who had aided the wounded in Tahrir Square during the Egyptian Revolution of 2011—was convinced to post political satire videos to YouTube, which launched a similarly themed career in Egyptian television that led to Youssef's arrest for insulting Islam and then-President Morsi and to becoming what Deutsche Welle called "perhaps the most famous personality in the Arab world at the moment."

YouTube served as a platform for individuals to voice their views about the parliamentary (2011) and presidential elections (2012) in Russia, in either a serious or satirical manner, one of which—the satire "Arrest of Vladimir Putin: a report from the courtroom"—was viewed enough times to make the list of most popular videos on YouTube for two consecutive weeks.

More than a third of the U.S. Senate introduced a bipartisan resolution condemning International Criminal Court indictee Joseph Kony 16 days after the Invisible Children, Inc.'s video "Kony 2012" was posted to YouTube. Resolution co-sponsor Senator Lindsey Graham said that "this YouTube sensation ... will do more to lead to (Kony's) demise than all other action combined." Politico's Scott Wong described the video, with 84 million YouTube views by its 17th day, as "the latest example of social media changing the policy debate and political dynamic on Capitol Hill." In 2015 The Washington Post's Caitlin Dewey posited that the video served as a social model for every subsequent online movement, and was "the first deployment of this thing we're now calling 'emergent opinion-based social identity'."

==== Promotion of extremist views ====
A 2017 New York Times Magazine article posited that YouTube had become "the new Conservative talk radio" for the far right. Research published in September 2018 by the Data & Society Research Institute reported that a collection of far-right political influencers use YouTube's recommendation engine—in concert with conventional brand-building techniques such as cross-marketing—to attract followers, and profit from monetization of engagements thus obtained. Though a 2019 New York Times article called the website "a godsend for hyper-partisans on all sides", the few progressive YouTube channels that flourished from 2012 to 2016 "were dwarfed by creators on the right". A Bellingcat analysis cited YouTube as the most frequent cause of "red-pilling" (converting to far-right beliefs), and a VOX-Pol analysis found that the 30,000 alt-right Twitter accounts linked to YouTube more often than to any other site. In The New York Times Kevin Roose described "countless" stories of "an aimless young man—usually white, frequently interested in video games—(who) visits YouTube looking for direction or distraction and is seduced by a community of far-right creators".

Research conducted by the Universidade Federal de Minas Gerais and École polytechnique fédérale de Lausanne and presented at the ACM Conference on Fairness, Accountability, and Transparency 2020 used information from the earlier Data & Society research and the Anti-Defamation League to categorize the levels of extremism of 360 YouTube channels and tracked users over 11 years by analysing 72 million comments, 2 million video recommendations, and 10,000 channel recommendations. The research found that users who engaged with less radical right-wing content tended over time to engage with more extremist content, which the researchers argued provides evidence for a "radicalization pipeline". According to a 2020 study published in The International Journal of Press/Politics, "An emerging journalistic consensus theorizes the central role played by the video 'recommendation engine,' but we believe that this is premature. Instead, we propose the 'Supply and Demand' framework for analyzing politics on YouTube." A 2021 study published in the Proceedings of the National Academy of Sciences found "no evidence that engagement with far-right content is caused by YouTube recommendations systematically, nor do we find clear evidence that anti-woke channels serve as a gateway to the far right. Rather, consumption of political content on YouTube appears to reflect individual preferences that extend across the web as a whole." A 2022 study published by the City University of New York found that "despite widespread concerns that YouTube's algorithms send people down 'rabbit holes' with recommendations to extremist videos, little systematic evidence exists to support this conjecture", "exposure to alternative and extremist channel videos on YouTube is heavily concentrated among a small group of people with high prior levels of gender and racial resentment.", and "contrary to the 'rabbit holes' narrative, non-subscribers are rarely recommended videos from alternative and extremist channels and seldom follow such recommendations when offered."

Given the tendency of YouTube's recommendation engine to suggest more radical videos (a tendency denied by YouTube officials), researcher Rebecca Lewis wrote that such networking "makes it easy for audience members to be incrementally exposed to, and come to trust, ever more extremist political positions". Ezra Klein wrote on Vox that "this is arguably the first time we’ve seen a distinctive ideological coalition emerging atop social media platforms and under the influence of social media algorithms". In accord, U.S. Senator Richard Blumenthal said that "YouTube is repeatedly used by malign actors... promoting very dangerous, disruptive narratives", adding that the website "tends to tolerate messaging and narratives that seem to be at the very, very extreme end of the political spectrum".

Almost a year before YouTube's January 2019 announcement that it would begin a "gradual change" of "reducing recommendations of borderline content and content that could misinform users in harmful ways", Zeynep Tufekci had written in The New York Times that, "(g)iven its billion or so users, YouTube may be one of the most powerful radicalizing instruments of the 21st century". For example, in Brazil—where YouTube is more widely watched than all but one TV channel—the website's recommendation engine was found to favor right-wing, conspiracy-filled channels including those of "a wave of right-wing YouTube stars (who) ran for office alongside (far-right president) Bolsonaro". Other videos increased a public perception that blames mosquito-borne Zika virus fever on vaccines or larvicides, inciting death threats against public health advocates.

Though viewership of far-right videos peaked in 2017—before YouTube's 2019 algorithm changes—through at least 2020 YouTube remained the only major social networking platform that was more popular among right-leaning users. In 2019–2020, mainstream conservatives fueled most growth in both video production and viewership.

Under YouTube's 2016-2019 changes to its recommendation engine, the most recommended channel evolved from conspiracy theorist Alex Jones to Fox News, especially Fox's "unabashedly conservative pundits". Fox News was said to fit into YouTube's "algorithmic sweet spots": being "rubber-stamped as an authoritative source" but having "partisan headline" videos. Leading up to the November 2020 U.S. presidential election, data showed the most frequently recommended Fox News videos were from "its pro-Trump prime-time shows that often attacked Democrats and sometimes spread unreliable information about voter fraud and the coronavirus". Following the 2020 election, "fringe, right-wing news channels aggressively pushing unfounded claims of widespread voter fraud" saw a greater percentage increase in views, while Fox News saw a decrease despite YouTube treating Fox as a "promoted, authoritative source". After the 2021 storming of the U.S. Capitol, YouTube took less aggressive action than other major social networking platforms toward Donald Trump, with CNBC noting that YouTube has historically taken a more hands-off approach to moderating content. Typically, YouTube has maintained a low profile as Facebook and Twitter took the brunt of backlashes in times of crisis, such as Russian interference in the 2016 elections and after the 2021 Capitol attack.

==== False political content ====
Disinformation on YouTube has been described as "rampant, unchecked". Lies and fallacies may spread through YouTube videos without labels or warnings. Observers have noted how YouTube policies lack transparency, are inconsistent across countries, and do not explicitly prohibit the spread of false information. According to Nobel laureate Maria Ressa, content on such platforms as YouTube and Facebook are being used to spread disinformation, promote historical denialism, and affect the integrity of elections.

In 2019, CBS News said that "compared to TV, online ads can spread lies at an alarming rate—bolstered by machine-learning algorithms that can identify target audiences at enormous speed and scale". CBS News reported that a group of Russian internet trolls posted over 1,100 videos largely meant to influence African-American voters in the 2016 presidential election. In December 2019, the YouTube CEO said that a Donald Trump false ad about Joe Biden was "not a violation of our policies", though "technically manipulated" misleading videos had been taken down, as were 300 of Trump's video ads mostly over the summer of 2019—though after having been run for a few days. In the week of the 2020 U.S. election, YouTube videos endorsing false claims of voter fraud were viewed more than 138 million times, though YouTube has said that videos disputing such fraud were more widely viewed.

In the Philippines, YouTube videos containing lies and urban legends are used to push a narrative that Ferdinand Marcos was a misunderstood hero and not a dictator who plundered the country. According to stories that appear on Rappler, the videos form part of a systematic disinformation campaign that help Marcos family members get elected to public office.

In 2025, YouTube began to restore channels that had been permanently banned for spreading misinformation.

=== False scientific content ===
Anti-intellectual beliefs flourish on YouTube. One well-publicized example is the network of content creators supporting the view that the Earth is flat, not a sphere. Researchers found that the YouTubers publishing "Flat Earth" content aim to polarize their audiences through arguments that build upon an anti-scientific narrative.

A study published in July 2019 concluded that most climate change-related videos support worldviews that are opposed to the scientific consensus on climate change. Though YouTube claimed in December 2019 that new recommendation policies reduced "borderline" recommendations by 70%, a January 2020 Avaaz study found that, for videos retrieved by the search terms "climate change", "global warming", and "climate manipulation", YouTube's "up next" sidebar presented videos containing information contradicting the scientific consensus 8%, 16% and 21% of the time, respectively. Avaaz argued that this "misinformation rabbit hole" means YouTube helps to spread climate denialism, and profits from it.

In November 2020, YouTube issued a one-week suspension of the account of One America News Network and permanently de-monetized its videos because of OANN's repeated violations of YouTube's policy prohibiting videos claiming sham cures for COVID-19. Without evidence, OANN also cast doubt on the validity of the 2020 U.S. presidential election.

On August 1, 2021, YouTube barred Sky News Australia from uploading new content for a week for breaking YouTube's rules on spreading COVID-19 misinformation. In September 2021, more than a year after YouTube said it would take down misinformation about the coronavirus vaccines, the accounts of six out of twelve anti-vaccine activists identified by the nonprofit Center for Countering Digital Hate were still searchable and still posting videos.

In October 2021, YouTube's owner Google announced it would no longer permit YouTube creators to earn advertising money for content that "contradicts well-established scientific consensus around the existence and causes of climate change", and that it will not allow ads that promote such views. In spite of this policy, many videos that included misinformation about climate change were not de-monetized. Earlier, climate change deniers' online YouTube content focused on denying global warming, or saying such warming is not caused by humans burning fossil fuel. As such denials became untenable, using new tactics that evade YouTube's policies to combat misinformation, content shifted to asserting that climate solutions are not workable, saying global warming is harmless or even beneficial, and accusing the environmental movement of being unreliable.

=== Expression of minorities and minority viewpoints ===
The Washington Post reported that a disproportionate share—8 of 20 in April 2012—of YouTube's most subscribed channels feature minorities, contrasting with mainstream American television, in which the stars are largely white. Such channels thus target an audience largely neglected by traditional networks, which feel pressure to appeal to a broader audience. According to the study, online media offer a way to push back against enduring stereotypes.

Science journalist Anna Rothschild wrote in 2019 that YouTube can be viewed as a "marvelous force for democratizing science and education" and has helped more young people find science role models than ever before, but its production and sponsorship models—still dominated by established media entities—increasingly resemble those of traditional media in a manner disfavoring women and racial minorities, with the Forbes list of highest-earning YouTubers in 2018 containing no black or female creators.

=== Sharing of personal information ===
==== Benefits of sharing personal information ====
After the 2010 repeal of the U.S. military's Don't ask, don't tell policy, numerous coming out videos—characterized as possibly being crucial to the individuals' self-actualization and growth, and even preventing suicide—were posted to YouTube. Uploaders were able to limit viewership of their videos, which were facilitated by what a clinical psychologist characterized as a disappearance of stigma surrounding the sharing of personal information.

People, especially the elderly, post "legacy project" videos to share their life stories, and can receive feedback from viewers enabling them to expand their social contacts. This interaction is particularly beneficial to those with limited mobility.

Because mainstream media presents few representations of persons with disabilities, YouTube content creators with disabilities are said to benefit from increased support and acceptance, discovery of other people with similar conditions, information sharing, and income. It is also perceived that their contributions can improve public perceptions about disability, thereby normalizing it.

==== Dangers of sharing personal information ====
Some personal-information videos, such as those depicting uploaders' self-harm, may have a negative impact on viewers. Such videos may encourage, normalize or sensationalize self-injury, may trigger viewers to self-injury, and may reinforce harmful behavior through regular viewing.

The ability of videos to bring fame to oneself or humiliation to others, has motivated physical violence, such as the video-recorded beating of a 16-year-old Florida cheerleader by six teenage girls over a half-hour time period, causing a concussion and temporary loss of hearing and sight, generating international media attention, and inspiring the 2011 Lifetime television network movie Girl Fight.

Some YouTube content creators have taken advantage of their perceived celebrity status and have abused their relationships with fans, sometimes perpetrating emotional manipulation or sexual abuse on teenagers younger than the age of consent. While, conversely, online creators have sometimes been the victims of false accounts of abuse, some bona fide victims do not report actual abuse out of victim-shaming by other fans, victims' self-blame, repression, fear of retribution, or delay in processing what had happened.

== Advertising and marketing ==
As other digital media platforms, YouTube uses a "triple-product" business model in which infotainment (information and entertainment) is exchanged for attention and user surveillance data, which in turn is monetized for targeted ad-revenue.

Online video, especially dominant player YouTube, has enabled small businesses to reach customers in ways previously accessible only to large companies that could afford television ads, and enables them to form "brand channels", track viewer metrics, and provide instructional videos to reduce the need for costly customer support. Large companies "amortize" the large cost of their Super Bowl television commercials by trying to maximize post-game video plays.

YouTube has focused on developing channels rather than creating content per se, the channels fragmenting the audience into niches in much the same way that decades earlier hundreds of niche-audience cable TV channels fragmented the audience previously dominated by the Big Three television networks. Based on YouTube's channel development plans, including YouTube Original Channels, journalist John Seabrook projected that "the niches will get nichier", with audiences being more engaged and much more quantifiable, enabling advertising to be more highly focused.

=== Measurement of mainstream opinion ===
In the year following its 2005 formation, YouTube, with its display of view counts, was likened to "a survey of cultural whims", whose more popular artists attracted the interest of established production companies. In YouTube's first years, however, music labels had trouble gauging the commercial value of online popularity, perceiving that the Internet's "convenience factor" made an artist's online following less indicative of audience attachment than direct measures such as CD sales and concert attendance. By early 2013 Billboard had announced that it was factoring YouTube streaming data into calculation of the Billboard Hot 100 chart and the Hot 100 formula-based genre charts. Putting online listens on the same footing as actual song purchases to determine hits was described as reflecting "the latest shift in power in the music industry: from record labels and radio DJs to listeners".

Later in 2013, Forbes' Katheryn Thayer noted that, though booking the right concert venues and radio and television stations once propelled artists to fame, social media activity had become "unquestionably important". Emphasizing the importance of the way the 2013 YouTube Music Awards determined winners—social media statistics informing nominations and social media shares determining winners—Thayer asserted that digital-era artists' work must not only be of high quality, but must elicit reactions on the YouTube platform and social media.

== Reaching wider audiences ==
YouTube has been used to grow audiences, both by undiscovered individual artists and by large production companies.

=== Evolution of YouTube as a platform for individuals and companies ===
Within the year following YouTube's 2005 launch—which one commentator called "the biggest jolt to Internet video"—entertainment industry executives and casting agents were researching video sharing websites. When a video hit big it was not uncommon for its creator to hear from production companies. By June 2006, recognized Hollywood and music industry firms had begun to establish formal business ties with "homegrown" YouTube talent—the first believed to be comedian blogger Brooke "Brookers" Brodack (through Carson Daly), then singer Justin Bieber (through Usher), and physician-become-political satirist Bassem Youssef (through an Egyptian television network).

Old media celebrities also moved into the website at the invitation of a YouTube management that witnessed early content creators accruing substantial followings, and perceived audience sizes potentially larger than that attainable by television. In June 2006 YouTube formed its first partnership with a major content provider, NBC, promoting its fall television lineup. In October 2006, Google paid $1.65 billion to purchase the 67-employee YouTube, seeking a lucrative marketing platform as both audiences and advertisers migrated from television to the Internet. Google made the website more business-driven, starting to overlay banner ads onto videos in August 2007. While the video platform remained available for its pioneering content creators, large production companies began to dominate.

Independent artists built grassroots followings numbering in the thousands at very little cost or effort, but mass retail and radio promotion—areas still dominated by record labels—proved problematic. Meanwhile, as early as 2006, YouTube management convinced four major music labels—who initially had been wary of the website because of its large quantity of their copyrighted material—to enter into a partnership with YouTube, convincing them that YouTube could help them make more money by connecting them with growing Internet audiences. In April 2009, YouTube and Vivendi teamed to form the Vevo music video service. Though YouTube invested $875,000 in its 2011 NextUp tips and training program for promising pioneering YouTubers, the company spent $100 million on its "originals" strategy to get mainstream celebrities to curate channels—hoping to benefit from both the personal fan loyalty cultivated by its pioneering content creators and the expected higher ad rates of the new celebrity channels. Paradoxically, it was the production companies eventually formed by pioneering YouTubers that created about one-third of these new "originals" channels.

By 2012, the CMU business editor had characterized YouTube as "a free-to-use... promotional platform for the music labels", and in 2013 the videos of the 2.5% of artists categorized as "mega", "mainstream" and "mid-sized" received 90.3% of the relevant views on YouTube and Vevo. In 2014 YouTube announced that it would block videos from labels that do not sign licensing contracts for the website's premium (paid subscription) music streaming service, in effect excluding independent record labels who have refused to sign contracts having terms inferior to those having already been agreed to by all the major labels. Yet, content creators continued to grow audiences by inspiring rapidly-forming "ecosystems of supplementary content" such as "reaction videos", causing a Washington Post editor to comment in 2019 that, more than slower-to-react conventional ratings such as the Billboard charts, "YouTubers are the tastemakers for millions of younger music fans".

In 2016, YouTube's demonetization of user videos that had "controversial or sensitive subjects and events ... even if graphic imagery is not shown”—thereby disallowing ad revenue—angered content creators who perceived the policy as "rampant censorship" and inspired a #YouTubeIsOverParty hashtag on social media.

=== Posting videos as a livelihood ===
Total annual earnings of the top ten YouTuber accounts, and the income of the single highest-earning account

Enabling a new way of earning a livelihood, YouTube's "Partner Program", an ad-revenue-sharing arrangement begun in 2007, grew by January 2012 to about 30,000 partners, its top five hundred partners each earning more than $100,000 annually and some earning "much more". Also, brands were reported in 2012 to pay six figures direct to the most popular YouTubers to create and upload ads. Forbes reported that in the year ending in June 2015, the ten highest-earning YouTube channels grossed from $2.5 million to $12 million. In the twelve months ending June 1, 2017, the ten highest earners grossed $127 million with the highest-earning individual channel grossing $16.5 million, these figures rising to $180.5 million and $22 million, respectively, in 2018 $162 million and $26 million (2019), $211 million and $29.5 million (2020), $300 million and $54 million (2021), and $314.5 million and $54 million (2022).

A study found that in 2016 the top 3% of channels (with 1.4 million views per month) got 90 percent of the website's viewership, and that someone with that many views would receive less than $17,000 per year. Reportedly, insiders say that YouTube's payment to channels ranges from $0.25 to $5 per thousand views; separately, influencers with at least 100,000 subscribers can receive $12,500 for a sponsored commercial post. A 2019 study found that only 11.6% of videos receive 1,000 views, and 0.77% reach 100,000 views.

== See also ==
- Computer addiction
- Internet addiction disorder
- Social aspects of television
- Social media
- Sociology of the Internet
- Television addiction
