= Lauren Jelencovich =

American singer

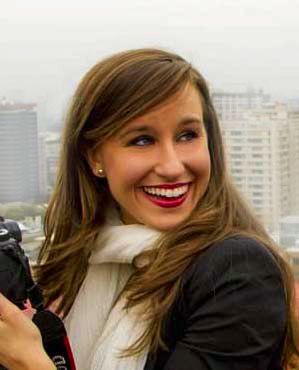

Background information
- Born: November 13, 1984 (age 41)
- Origin: Florida and New York
- Genres: Opera, musical theater, pop
- Instrument: Voice (soprano)
- Years active: 2001–present
- Website: LaurenJelencovich.com

Lauren Jelencovich (born November 13, 1984) is an American singer.

While in high school, Jelencovich won the grand prize on Ed McMahon's Next Big Star, McMahon's successor program to Star Search. A graduate of the Manhattan School of Music, Jelencovich has performed stage roles in several operas. Since 2010 she has been a lead vocalist on Yanni's international tours and in his CD/DVD/PBS Special, Yanni Live at El Morro, Puerto Rico, and was the primary artist (soprano vocalist) for a track in Yanni's Inspirato album.

== Music career ==
While still attending high school at The King's Academy in West Palm Beach, Florida, Jelencovich won the grand prize on Ed McMahon's Next Big Star, McMahon's successor program to Star Search. She released her first album, Lauren Jelencovich, in 2003.

Jelencovich, a soprano, majored in vocal performance at New York's Manhattan School of Music, focusing on opera and musical theater, also singing light pop. While at that institution, she was the first undergraduate to be selected as part of the school's Educational Outreach Program.

By age 20, Jelencovich had performed at Carnegie Hall in New York and at the MGM Grand Las Vegas. After being awarded the National Italian Federation's Andrea Bocelli Scholarship, Jelencovich sang "The Prayer" for Bocelli at a private event.

"Nightingale"
Jelencovich's performance of "Nightingale" in the live concert Yanni Live at El Morro, Puerto Rico.
She performed the same song in Yanni's Inspirato album.

In May 2005, Jelencovich was included in People magazine's "Beauties on Your Block," part of the magazine's annual "50 Most Beautiful People" issue. She also appeared in Teen magazine.

In 2006, Jelencovich made her off-Broadway debut in Wallace and Allen Shawn's play/opera, The Music Teacher.

Jelencovich was a finalist and received a Lys Symonette Award in the 2008 Lotte Lenya Competition administered by the Kurt Weill Foundation for Music. Finalists were judged based on regional competitions, video submissions, and a live program required to include an opera/operetta aria, an American musical theater number, and two contrasting Kurt Weill selections.

Jelencovich won Second Prize in the 2009 Gerda Lissner International Vocal Competition in New York.

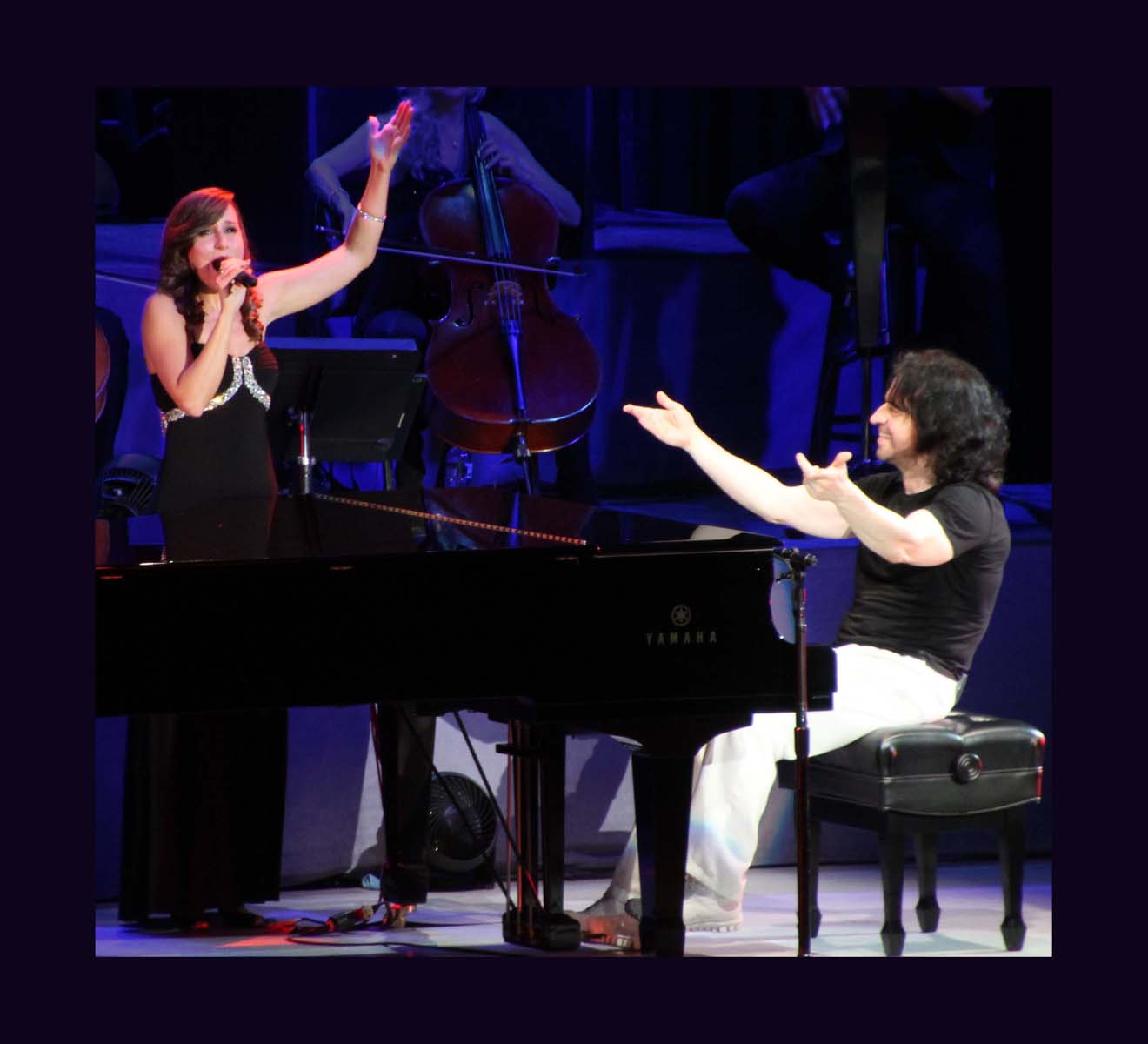
Jelencovich performing onstage with Yanni and his orchestra.

Also in 2009, Jelencovich made her mainstage opera debut at Opera Tampa (Florida, U.S.) in the lead roles of Lauretta in Gianni Schicchi and Suor Genovieffa in Suor Angelica.

Jelencovich played Mrs. Nordstrom in the 2010 Opera Theatre of Saint Louis (OTSL) production of A Little Night Music, which was directed by fashion designer Isaac Mizrahi and starred Amy Irving. A member of OTSL's Gerdine Young Artist program, Jelencovich also covered for the part of Violet Beauregard in the world premier of The Golden Ticket, an opera based on Roald Dahl’s book Charlie and the Chocolate Factory. Also in 2010, Jelencovich performed at Carnegie Hall in the New York premiere of the orchestral version of Benjamin Britten’s Te Deum in C, performing with the Oratorio Society of New York led by Kent Tritle.

Since November 2010, Jelencovich has performed as a lead vocalist on Yanni's international tours, which included performances in North and South America, Europe, Asia and Africa. Jelencovich's vocals were included in three tracks from Yanni's live-concert CD and DVD Yanni Live at El Morro, Puerto Rico (released April 2012), which was also broadcast in PBS television specials beginning in March 2012. She also was the primary artist (soprano vocalist) for the "Nightingale" track to Yanni's 2014 Plácido Domingo-Ric Wake collaboration album, Inspirato, and performed in Yanni's 2015 The Dream Concert: Live from the Great Pyramids of Egypt and in the resulting 2016 CD/DVD and PBS special. On November 30, 2017, Jelencovich performed "Nightingale" in Jeddah, Saudi Arabia, Yanni later saying that Jelencovich was the first woman allowed to perform onstage in that nation without wearing the traditional veil, and was the first woman in recent history to sing on stage for a mixed audience of men and women in that country.

== Influences ==
Jelencovich related that she had always had music around her, singing in choruses starting in elementary school, soloing in the fourth grade, and thinking about singing seriously while in high school. She also expressed a love for "princess songs" from Disney movies.

Jelencovich said that she has been influenced by different genres of music, specifically, studying opera and "dabbling" in musical theatre while attending the Manhattan School of Music and remarking that she tries to combine musical theatre, pop and opera into one. Particular artist influences include Celine Dion and Whitney Houston in pop music; as well as Diana Damrau, Natalie Dessay and Joan Sutherland in opera.

== Awards, honors and distinctions ==
- 2002: Grand Prize winner, Ed McMahon's Next Big Star
- 2008: Lys Symonette Award, Lotte Lenya Competition of the Kurt Weill Foundation for Music
- 2009: Second Prize, Gerda Lissner International Vocal Competition, New York

== Discography ==
Lauren Jelencovich
Clover Records (CD: July 18, 2003, ASIN: B000CAEETQ)

1. Hopelessly Falling — 3:40
2. Secret Love — 3:54
3. Are You Gonna Kiss Me — 3:19
4. I Though You Did — 3:02
5. Together — 4:02
6. The Truth About Cats and Dogs — 3:29
7. When It's Love — 3:27
8. I Will Remember You — 3:33
9. Wish I May — 4:46

Yanni Live at El Morro, Puerto Rico
Yanni-Wake Entertainment (CD, DVD: April 17, 2012, ASIN: B00786XVOG)

7. Nightingale — 5:17
8. Ode to Humanity ("Aria") — 4:05
9. Niki Nana ("We Are One") — 7:49

Wildest Dreams
Independent (CD: December 11, 2013, ASIN: B00H38OZZI)

1. In Your Wildest Dreams — 3:55
2. The Prayer — (David Foster; Carole Bayer Sager; Alberto Testa; Tony Renis) — 4:25
3. Home to Stay — (Amy Foster-Skylark; Jeremy Lubbock) — 4:38
4. Danny Boy — (Frederick Edward Weatherly) — 3:51
5. Autumn Leaves — (József "Joseph" Kosma; Jacques Prévert; John Herndon "Johnny" Mercer) — 4:46
6. Without You — (Tom Evans; Peter Ham) — 3:14
7. You're Still You — (Linda Diane Thompson; Ennio Morricone) — 3:40
8. Wishing You Were Somehow Here Again — (Andrew Lloyd Webber; Charles Hart; Richard Stilgoe) — 3:32
9. You'll Never Walk Alone — (Richard Charles Rodgers; Oscar Greeley Clendenning Hammerstein, II) — 3:29
10. Time to Say Goodbye — (Francesco Sartori; Lucio Quarantotto) — 4:05
11. Without a Song — (Vincent Millie Youmans; William "Billy" Rose) — 2:23

Inspirato
Yanni Wake Entertainment (CD: March 2014, ASIN B00I17OA8W)

10. Usignolo (Nightingale) — 5:14

The Dream Concert: Live from the Great Pyramids of Egypt
Sony Masterworks (CD: June 2016, ASIN: B01BZGFXXG)

11. Niki Nana — 6:41

With a Little Help from My Friends (group collaboration; single)
Broadway Records; Artists for the Arts (Digital download: March 21, 2017, ASIN: B06XQ7GHYC)

1. With a Little Help from My Friends — 4:43

== See also ==
- Opera
- Musical theater
- Classical music
