= All In (Levs book) =

All In: How Our Work-First Culture Fails Dads, Families, and Businesses--And How We Can Fix It Together
- Author: Josh Levs
- Language: English
- Genre: Management, parenting, gender discrimination
- Publisher: HarperOne
- Publication date: May 12, 2015 (Hardcover)
- Publication place: United States
- Media type: Hardcover, Kindle Edition, Audio CD
- Pages: 272 pages (hardcover)
- ISBN: 978-0-06-234961-3

All In: How Our Work-First Culture Fails Dads, Families, and Businesses—And How We Can Fix It Together is a 2015 book by journalist Josh Levs urging changes in employment practices, government policy, and societal attitudes concerning fathers and family care.

== Background ==
When Levs, a CNN journalist, requested extended paid parental leave from CNN’s parent company Time Warner in August 2013, he was denied anything more than the two weeks paid leave for biological fathers—much less than 10 weeks paid leave that were provided for women and for men who had babies through adoption or surrogacy. Levs used his two paid weeks, and additionally vacation and sick days as he cared for his three children and wife, who had developed severe preeclampsia. Levs filed a charge with the Equal Employment Opportunity Commission (EEOC) against Time Warner demanding equitable paid paternity leave, the claim essentially prevailing a year later. Though Time Warner changed its family leave policies, the changes were not retroactive to benefit Levs himself.

== Content ==
Kirkus Reviews wrote that All In provides "well-documented and easy-to-comprehend data on why men need more paid time off to be with their newborn children." Levs' analysis was said to show how the workplace has not kept pace with the significant changes in "male-female dynamics at home" over the past 50 years, and that, in addition to his scrutiny and evaluation of paid paternity leave, Levs also considered issues relating to absentee fathers, lack of intimacy for new parents, and finding the mental and spiritual balance needed for parenting during times of stress.

Publishers Weekly described All In as a "call for men to fight against the laws, policies, and stigmas preventing them from fully participating in their families’ lives," more specifically, discussing parental leave, the tax system, paid family leave, the "doofus dad" stereotype, fear of men as predators, the stigma against men taking time off work for family, and a plea for men and women to work together, as well as providing action plans for family-supportive work environments. The Daily Beast's Andy Hinds added that All In argues that the "pop culture image of dads as lazy and uninvolved" is both false and damaging, pigeonholing both men and women.

All In characterizes the workplace as forcing men to place career before family, and penalizing them if they don't. The book urges that men be accurately portrayed and more strongly supported in their fatherhood roles, such as with federally mandated paternity leave, and flextime and remote work opportunities.

Business Lexington's Paul Sanders wrote that All In reads like "a series of thematically linked essays" in a broad-brush approach that attempts to touch many facets of the problem, noting the book's extensive fact-checking approach. The book is said to spotlight gender discrimination in an American workplace that trails much of the world on the issue, noting that in industry's "war for talent" companies can attract and retain employees by offering paid paternity leave.

The title All In is a play on the title of Sheryl Sandberg’s 2013 women's empowerment book, Lean In. Levs was said to expand and detail Sandberg’s argument that advancing the American economy depends on changing workplace structures, not only for women but for men. Time's Charlotte Alter summarized the gist of All In as being that "men should lean in just as much as women—they should just do it in a different direction."
