= The Dream Concert: Live from the Great Pyramids of Egypt =

Live album & Concert film by Yanni
- Released: June 3, 2016
- Recorded: October 30–31, 2015
- Genre: Contemporary instrumental adult contemporary
- Label: Sony Masterworks
- Producer: Yanni

Yanni chronology
Sensuous Chill (2016)	The Dream Concert: Live from the Great Pyramids of Egypt (2016)	In His Purest Form (2020)

The Dream Concert: Live from the Great Pyramids of Egypt is the fifth live album and concert video by contemporary instrumentalist Yanni, officially released on June 3, 2016. The two concerts were performed outdoors on October 30 and 31, 2015, on the grounds of the Egyptian pyramids and Great Sphinx of Giza, Yanni's first performance in Egypt.

== Background ==
The concerts included fireworks and a video broadcast from International Space Station commander Scott Kelly, and were recorded in 4K HD for subsequent broadcast on PBS.

To convey an image of stable security after the Egyptian Crisis (2011–14), an Egyptian security force of 3,000 people secured the concert area; the terrorist downing of Metrojet Flight 9268 in the Sinai Peninsula happened to occur on the morning of October 31, 2015 – between the times of the two Cairo concerts.

Yanni's lighting manager for over twenty years, Bud Horowitz, said that the Pyramids location brought its own set of challenges. The Great Pyramid was a kilometer behind the stage, and 24 searchlights had to be brought to Egypt from Germany to light the pyramids and Sphinx in the background so that they were visible beyond the bright stage lighting for the 4K television cameras. It isn't possible to bring the full set of lighting equipment to distant venues – bringing instead only the control consoles – so Horowitz and the production manager had to work in advance to communicate equipment specs to local promoters. Yanni's shows are cue-specific and timing-specific, with over 2,000 lighting cues for each show.

== Location ==
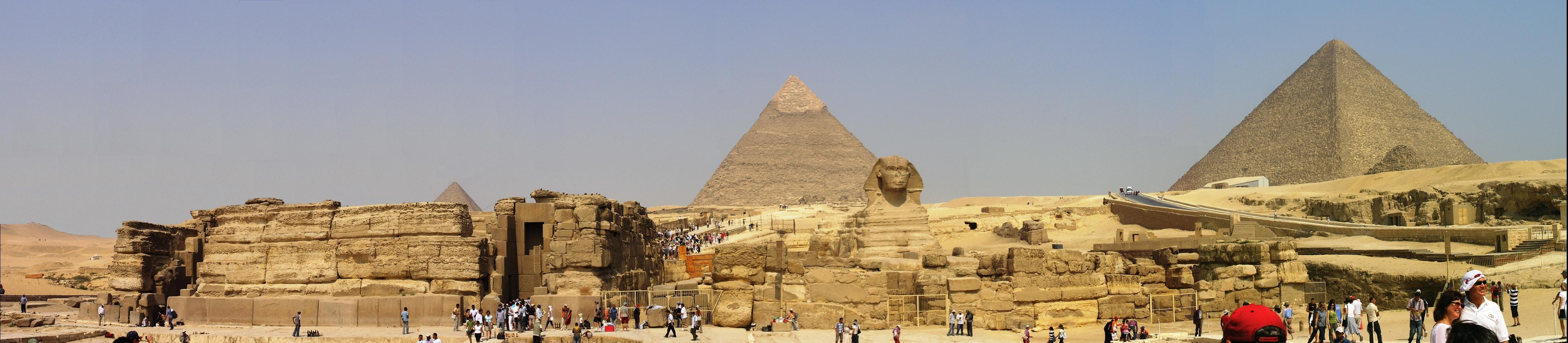
Yanni's two 2015 concerts were performed at nighttime on the Giza Plateau, with the Egyptian pyramids and Great Sphinx in the background.

== Track listings ==
First disc -- CD:

No.	Title	Length
1.	"One Man's Dream"	2:46
2.	"For All Seasons"	6:01
3.	"Yanni: Welcome"	3:45
4.	"Felitsa"	4:51
5.	"Acroyali"	2:17
6.	"Human Condition"	5:12
7.	"Dreams Come True Interlude"	2:43
8.	"Reflections of Passion"	4:33
9.	"Standing in Motion"	1:50
10.	"Nostalgia"	4:20
11.	"Niki Nana"	6:41
12.	"Santorini"	4:49
13.	"International Space Station Message"	3:53
14.	"The Storm"	4:18

Second disc -- DVD:

No.	Title	Length
1.	"Introduction: Dream Sequence"	1:41
2.	"One Man's Dream"	2:46
3.	"For All Seasons"	6:01
4.	"Yanni: Welcome"	3:45
5.	"Felitsa"	4:51
6.	"Acroyali"	2:17
7.	"Human Condition"	5:12
8.	"Dreams Come True Interlude"	2:43
9.	"Reflections of Passion"	4:33
10.	"Standing In Motion"	1:50
11.	"Nostalgia"	4:20
12.	"Niki Nana"	6:41
13.	"Santorini"	4:49
14.	"International Space Station Message"	3:53
15.	"The Storm"	4:18

== Credits ==
=== Musician and vocalist credits ===
Musicians: (alphabetically)

Charles Adams: drums
Benedikt Brydern: violin
Jason Carder: trumpet and flugelhorn
Yoel Del Sol: percussion
Víctor Espínola: harp
Ming Freeman: keyboards
James Mattos: French horn
Sarah O’Brien: cello
Mary Simpson: violin
Dana Teboe: trombone
Gabriel Vivas: bass
Yanni: Keyboards, Piano, Primary Artist
Samvel Yervinyan: violin
Alexander Zhiroff: cello

Vocalists: (alphabetically)

Lauren Jelencovich
Lisa Lavie

=== Non-performance credits ===
Other than musicians and vocalists: (alphabetically)

Producers: Layla Akl, Ashraf Haridy, Robert Murray, Krystalán - Krystal Ann, Tom Paske, Anthony Stabile, Yanni
Associate producers: Mike Regan, Shannon Walden
Cinematography: Pete Martich, Whitney Padgett, Randy Taylor, Kenneth Thomas

Misc. category or multiple-role: (alphabetically)

Chris Bellman: Audio Master, Mastering
Sean Daly: Editing, Photography Director
Matthew Levin: Director, Editing
Travis Meck: Engineer, Mixing, Mixing Engineer, Sound Production
Norman Moore: Art Direction
Colin O'Malley: Orchestration, Transcription
Stuart Russell: Composer
Paul Sarault: Engineer
Anthony Stabile: Mixing Engineer
Tommy Sterling: Composer, Mixing Engineer
Yanni: Arranger, Composer, Liner Notes, Mixing, Mixing Engineer, Orchestration, Sound Production
Krystalán: Muli-Media Production, Photographer
