= Playlist: The Very Best of Yanni =

Greatest hits album by Yanni
- Released: January 29, 2013
- Genre: New-age; Easy listening Soft adult contemporary
- Length: 74:30
- Label: Windham Hill
- Producer: Yanni

Yanni chronology
Live at El Morro, Puerto Rico (2012)	Playlist: The Very Best of Yanni (2013)	Inspirato (2014)

Professional ratings
Review scores
Source	Rating
AllMusic	3/5 stars

Playlist: The Very Best of Yanni is a compilation album by keyboardist and composer Yanni, released on the Windham Hill label in 2013. This recordings for the compilation have been remastered recordings.

== Track listing ==
No.	Title	Length
1.	"Once Upon a Time"	3:50
2.	"Chasing Shadows"	5:42
3.	"Flight of Fantasy"	5:39
4.	"In the Mirror"	4:02
5.	"Marching Season"	5:34
6.	"The Rain Must Fall"	4:36
7.	"Swept Away"	5:08
8.	"Nostalgia"	4:29
9.	"Aria"	3:58
10.	"A Love for Life"	5:06
11.	"To the One Who Knows"	5:37
12.	"Santorini" (from Live at the Acropolis)	6:57
13.	"Acroyali/Standing in Motion" (from Live at the Acropolis)	8:37
14.	"Reflections of Passion" (from Live at the Acropolis)	5:03

== Reception ==
Windham Hill's Playlist: The Very Best of Yanni collects 14 tracks from the new age keyboardist's long discography. While it may not be the most thorough Yanni compilation, and a few of his big singles are left off the track listing, it's a solid, 75-minute overview that should satisfy the needs of most. Highlights include the hit singles "A Love for Life", "Aria", and "Chasing Shadows.
