= Live at El Morro, Puerto Rico =

Live album & Concert film by Yanni
- Released: April 17, 2012
- Recorded: December 16–17, 2011
- Venues: Castillo San Felipe del Morro; Old San Juan, Puerto Rico
- Genres: Contemporary instrumental Easy listening
- Length: 49:59 (CD); 61:07 (DVD)
- Label: Yanni/Wake Entertainment under exclusive license to Sony Music Entertainment
- Producers: Yanni; Ric Wake

Yanni chronology
Truth of Touch (2011)	Live at El Morro, Puerto Rico (2012)	Playlist: The Very Best of Yanni (2013)

Yanni: Live at El Morro
- Special concert by Yanni
- Venue: Castillo San Felipe del Morro; Old San Juan, Puerto Rico
- Date: December 16–17, 2011
- No. of shows: 2
- Attendance: 7,500 per show 15,000 total
- Box office: $1.5 million

Professional ratings
Review scores
Source	Rating
AllMusic	3/5 stars

Live at El Morro, Puerto Rico is the fourth live album by Yanni, released on the Yanni/Wake label in 2012. The two concerts were performed outdoors on the grounds of El Morro castle in San Juan, Puerto Rico in December 2011.

The CD peaked at #1 on Billboard's New Age Album list in both 2012 and 2013.

== Background ==
Live at El Morro, Puerto Rico was recorded and filmed during two sold-out concerts performed outdoors on December 16 and 17, 2011, on the grounds of the Castillo San Felipe del Morro ("El Morro"), a UNESCO World Heritage Site in the Old San Juan. Yanni had reportedly planned for twenty years to perform at the historic site.

Yanni explained that two concerts were planned, for Friday and Saturday night, with the ensuing Sunday being a contingent rain day. It reportedly rained for 25 days in a row preceding the first night's concert on Friday, and the first concert itself was interrupted and eventually cut short three-quarters of the way through, by rain and wind causing danger for the outdoor performance.

The evening of the second show, Saturday, the weather was better and the show was completed as planned. Yanni said that 35 cameras, and three live camera operators, were able to capture the show. Departing the island on Sunday, the planned rain day, Yanni noted that it was raining and he could not have carried out a make-up concert then.

Yanni later remarked that "the weather became part of the show," but that it was the first time in his thirty-year career that a concert had been stopped. To individuals affected by the Friday evening concert that was cut short, the concert's production, José Dueño Entertainment, offered rain checks on tickets towards the next Yanni concert in Puerto Rico or any other José Dueño Entertainment production, and a certificate valid towards receiving the concert DVD.

The concerts involved sale of over 10,000 tickets, and cost $3 million to put on.

The concerts were the subject of special broadcasts on PBS beginning in March 2012, the video having been recorded in high definition. The production was Yanni's tenth collaboration with PBS.

The Live at El Morro, Puerto Rico CD peaked as Billboard's #1 New Age Album (2012 and 2013), at #109 on the Billboard 200 (2012), and debuted at #52 on the Canadian Albums Chart.

== Album track listing ==
CD:

No.	Title	Length
1.	"Truth of Touch"	4:23
2.	"Vertigo"	4:21
3.	"The End of August"	5:07
4.	"The Rain Must Fall"	8:11
5.	"Felitsa"	4:43
6.	"Voyage"	4:13
7.	"Nightingale" (featuring vocals by Lauren Jelencovich)	5:17
8.	"Ode to Humanity" (featuring vocals by Lauren Jelencovich and Lisa Lavie)	4:05
9.	"Niki Nana" (featuring vocals by Lisa Lavie and Lauren Jelencovich)	7:49
10.	"One Man's Dream"	3:09

== DVD track listing ==
Video DVD:

No.	Title	Length
1.	"Truth of Touch"	4:31
2.	"Vertigo"	5:33
3.	"The End of August"	5:13
4.	"The Rain Must Fall"	8:34
5.	"Felitsa"	4:45
6.	"Voyage"	4:52
7.	"Nightingale" (featuring vocals by Lauren Jelencovich)	5:51
8.	"Harp Solo" (featuring Victor Espinola)	2:40
9.	"Ode to Humanity" (featuring vocals by Lauren Jelencovich and Lisa Lavie)	4:33
10.	"Niki Nana" (featuring vocals by Lisa Lavie and Lauren Jelencovich)	8:50
11.	"One Man's Dream"	3:23

DVD Extras:

- Yanni in Puerto Rico
- Making of the Show

== Musicians and vocalists ==
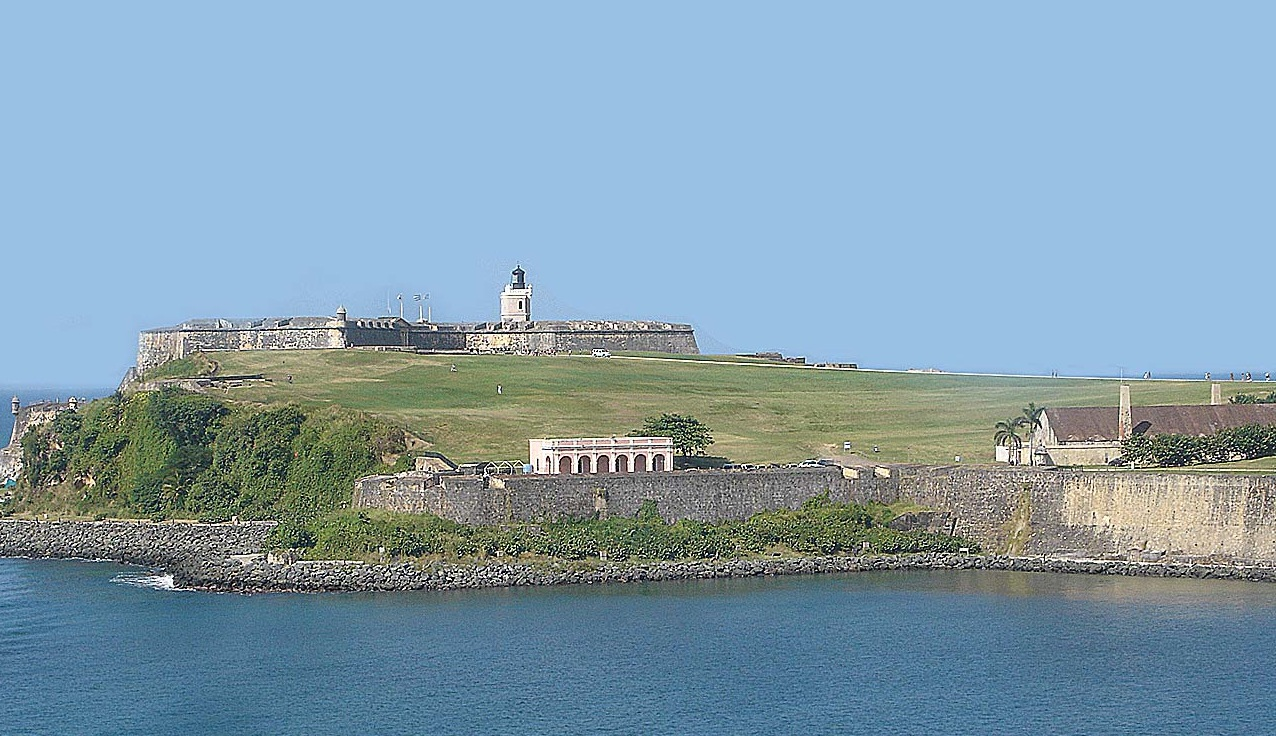
The grounds of El Morro, looking north. Yanni's concerts took place on a temporarily erected stage and grandstands, erected the month after this photo was taken, on the grass area overlooking the western cliffs on the left. The main structure of the fort is atop the hill.

Musicians: (alphabetically)

- Charles Adams: drums
- Benedikt Brydern: violin
- Jason Carder: trumpet and flugelhorn
- Yoel Del Sol: percussion
- Víctor Espínola: harp
- Ming Freeman: keyboards
- James Mattos: French horn
- Sarah O’Brien: cello
- Mary Simpson: violin
- Dana Teboe: trombone
- Gabriel Vivas: bass
- Samvel Yervinyan: violin
- Alexander Zhiroff: cello

Vocalists: (alphabetically)

- Lauren Jelencovich
- Lisa Lavie
