= Josh Levs =

- Education: Yale University
- Occupation: Broadcast journalist
- Spouse: Melanie Lasoff (m. 2003)
- Website: joshlevs.com

Joshua Levs, commonly known as Josh Levs, is an American broadcast journalist. Born in Albany, New York, he reported for the CNN news television network. until 2015.

== Biography ==
Levs was raised in a Conservative Jewish family in Albany, New York and received his undergraduate degree from Yale University. He worked for NPR in Atlanta before moving to CNN. Levs spent more than 10 years at CNN, reporting across all platforms and networks.

When Levs requested extended paid parental leave from CNN's parent company Time Warner in August 2013, he was denied anything more than the two weeks of paid leave for biological fathers—much less than 10 weeks paid leave that were provided for women and for men who had babies through adoption or surrogacy. Levs used his two paid weeks, and additionally vacation and sick days as he cared for his three children and wife, who had developed severe preeclampsia. Levs filed a charge with the Equal Employment Opportunity Commission against Time Warner demanding equitable paid paternity leave, essentially winning the claim a year later.

Levs is married to Melanie Lasoff; they have three children.

== Parenting book ==
According to the Today Show, Levs turned his paternity leave experience into a 2015 book, All In: How Our Work-First Culture Fails Dads, Families, and Businesses--And How We Can Fix It Together, asserting the need for more paternity leave in view of changes in family dynamics that have occurred over the last fifty years.

== See also ==
- Thornton, Terri, "CNN's Joshua Levs Uses Social Media Savvy in Hard, Soft News", PBS, December 16, 2010. (WebCite archive)
- "TEDxEmory - Josh Levs - Breaking the system to achieve the impossible", TED talks video, posted August 12, 2011. (WebCite archive)
