= Lisa Lavie =

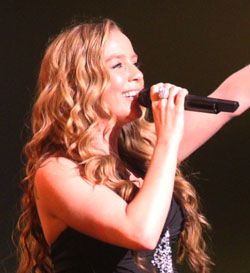
- Lavie performing in 2011

Background information
- Origin: LaSalle, Quebec, Canada
- Genres: Pop, R&B, soul
- Occupations: Singer-songwriter, video producer
- Instruments: Vocals, piano
- Years active: 2006–present

Lisa Lavie (surname pronounced lah-vee) is a Canadian singer and songwriter originally from LaSalle, Quebec, Canada.

== Background ==
Lavie's early musical influences included her older brothers, hip hop dancer Michael and disk jockey Danny. At age 16 Lavie toured Canada as a backup singer with the French-Canadian hip hop group Dubmatique, after which she recorded her own demo CD. Lavie's demo CD reached the same producer who had co-written Mariah Carey's first album, and Lavie accepted his invitation to move to California to work with him.

== Career ==
In 2006, Lavie's vocals were included on the soundtracks of the motion pictures Stick It and The Guardian.

In 2007, Lavie became one of the earliest to use the Internet to reach fans and arouse interest of record labels. By October her music video "Angel" was featured on YouTube's front page and became a finalist in the 2007 YouTube Awards music category.

Lavie was listed as singer-songwriter in her first album, Everything or Nothing, which was released under an independent record label.

In February 2010, Lavie produced and performed in the charity collaboration video "We Are the World 25 for Haiti (YouTube edition)" for relief of victims of the 2010 Haiti earthquake. Journalist Diane Sawyer named the video's contributors ABC News' "Persons of the Week."

In 2010 Lavie became a vocalist of contemporary instrumentalist Yanni on his tours, contributing vocal tracks to Yanni's 2012 live-concert CD/DVD and PBS special, Yanni Live at El Morro, Puerto Rico.

In autumn 2014, Lavie joined the Eastern touring group of Trans-Siberian Orchestra as a vocalist. Lavie was one of seven singers and musicians who were invited to participate in CBC Music's October 2014 Songcamp.

Lavie performed in Yanni's October 2015 The Dream Concert: Live from the Great Pyramids of Egypt and in the resulting 2016 CD/DVD and PBS special.

On March 21, 2017, Lavie released her second album Lisa Lavie which debuted at No. 25 on the R&B Billboard album charts.

In the early 2020s, Lavie formed a team of Montreal area real estate brokers, Équipe Lavie (Team Lavie), and in 2024 joined the Casa docu-reality television series Numéros 1.

== Discography ==
=== Studio albums ===
Title	Album details
Everything or Nothing	Released: May 13, 2008; Label: Independent; Format: Digital download
Lisa Lavie	Released: March 21, 2017; Label: Independent; Format: Digital download

=== Performances on others' albums or programs ===
Title	Year	Work
"If Only I Knew"	2006	Stick It movie soundtrack
"The Mockingbird"	2006	The Guardian movie soundtrack
"Ode to Humanity" ("Aria")	2012	Yanni Live at El Morro, Puerto Rico; Live concert CD/DVD, and PBS special
"Niki Nana" ("We Are One")	2012	Yanni Live at El Morro, Puerto Rico; Live concert CD/DVD, and PBS special
"Niki Nana" ("We Are One")	2016	The Dream Concert: Live from the Great Pyramids of Egypt live concert CD/DVD and PBS special.
