= Yanni Live! The Concert Event =

Live album & Concert film by Yanni
- Released: August 15, 2006
- Genre: Instrumental; New age
- Length: 65:25
- Label: Image Entertainment
- Producer: Yanni

Yanni chronology
The Collection (2006)	Yanni Live! The Concert Event (2006)	Super Hits (2007)

DVD Cover
- Yanni Live! DVD cover

Yanni Live! The Concert Event is the third live album by Yanni. It was recorded live at the Mandalay Bay Events Center, Las Vegas on November 6, 2004, and released in August 2006 as a CD and concert film on DVD. The album peaked at No. 1 on Billboard's "Top New Age Albums" chart; No. 6 on the "Top Independent Albums" chart; No. 84 on the "Billboard 200" chart; and at No. 84 on the "Top Internet Albums" chart, during the same year.

== Critical reception ==
Professional ratings
Review scores
Source	Rating
AllMusic	3.5/5 stars

In a review by Richie Unterberger of AllMusic, "Recorded and filmed for DVD live at the Mandalay Bay Resort & Casino in Las Vegas during Yanni's 2005 world tour, this 65-minute set delivers what you'd expect from a live Yanni album: an eclectic, cinematic fusion of world, new age, and mainstream contemporary pop styles. The 13 songs are, with one exception, drawn from releases dating back to the 1980s ("Keys to the Imagination" having been the title track of his 1986 album) all the way up to the most recent studio effort predating this recording, 2003's Ethnicity (from which three songs are presented)."

== Track listing – Album ==
1. "Rainmaker" – 5:20
2. "Keys to Imagination" – 5:22
3. "Enchantment" – 4:06
4. "Standing in Motion" – 1:38
5. "On Sacred Ground" – (McNeill, Yanni) – 7:56
6. "Playtime" – 7:08
7. "Until the Last Moment" – 6:36
8. "If I Could Tell You" – 4:19
9. "For All Seasons" – 8:14
10. "The Storm" – 5:07 (based on Antonio Vivaldi's 18th century violin concerto "Summer" from The Four Seasons)
11. "Prelude" – 5:21
12. "Nostalgia" – 4:31

== Track listing – Video ==
1. "Standing in Motion"
2. "Rainmaker"
3. "Keys to Imagination"
4. "Enchantment"
5. "On Sacred Ground"
6. "Playtime"
7. "Until the Last Moment"
8. "If I Could Tell You"
9. "For All Seasons"
10. "The Storm"
11. "Prelude"
12. "Nostalgia"
13. "World Dance"

== Personnel ==
- Yanni (Greece) – Piano, Keyboards

Band

- Charlie Adams (USA) – drums
- Victor Espinola (Paraguay) – harp, vocals
- Pedro Eustache (Venezuela) – flute, saxophone, duduk, whistle, bansuri
- Ramon Flores (Mexico) – trumpet
- Ming Freeman (Taiwan) – keyboards
- David Hudson (Australia) – didgeridoo
- Hussain Jiffry (Sri Lanka) – bass guitar
- Sayaka Katsuki (Japan) – violin
- Dan Landrum (USA) – hammered dulcimer
- Armen Movsessian (Armenia) – violin
- Walter Rodriguez (Puerto Rico) – percussion
- Samvel Yervinyan (Armenia) – violin

Vocalists

- Alfreda Gerald (USA)
- Michelle Amato (USA)

Orchestra

- Kristen Autry (USA) – violin
- April Cap (USA) – oboe
- Zachary Carrettin (USA) – violin
- Ilona Geller (Ukraine) – viola
- Kerry Hughes (USA) – trumpet
- Jim Mattos (USA) – French horn
- Eugene Mechtovich (USA) – viola
- Kristin Morrison (USA) – French horn
- Sarah O'Brien (England) – cello
- Dana Teboe (USA) – trombone
- Erika Walczak (USA) – violin
- Alexander Zhiroff (Russia) – cello

== "Yanni Live!" tour dates ==
Date	City	Country	Venue
North America
November 6, 2004	Las Vegas	United States	Mandalay Bay Events Center
November 7, 2004	Phoenix	United States	Glendale Arena
November 9, 2004	Tucson	United States	Tucson Convention Center
November 11, 2004	Sacramento	United States	Arrowhead Pond
November 12, 2004	San Jose	United States	HP Pavilion
November 13, 2004	Sacramento	United States	ARCO Arena
November 14, 2004	Reno	United States	Lawlor Events Center
November 16, 2004	Fresno	United States	Save Mart Arena
November 17, 2004	Bakersfield	United States	Centennial Arena
November 19, 2004	Spokane	United States	Spokane Arena
November 20, 2004	Portland	United States	Rose Garden Arena
November 21, 2004	Seattle	United States	KeyArena
November 22, 2004	Vancouver	Canada	Pacific Coliseum
November 24, 2004	Calgary	Canada	Saddledome
November 25, 2004	Edmonton	Canada	Rexall Place
November 27, 2004	Salt Lake City	United States	Delta Center
November 28, 2004	Denver	United States	Pepsi Center
November 29, 2004	Colorado Springs	United States	World Arena
December 1, 2004	Houston	United States	Toyota Center
December 2, 2004	Dallas	United States	NextStage
December 4, 2004	Monterrey	Mexico	Monterrey Arena
December 7, 2004	Hidalgo	United States	Dodge Arena
December 8, 2004	Laredo	United States	Entertainment Center
December 10, 2004	Mexico City	Mexico	Mexico Sports Palace
January 19, 2005	Wilkes-Barre	United States	Wachovia Arena at Casey Plaza
January 21, 2005	New York City	United States	Radio City Music Hall
January 22, 2005	New York City	United States	Radio City Music Hall
January 23, 2005	Uncasville	United States	Mohegan Sun
January 25, 2005	Albany	United States	Pepsi Arena
January 27, 2005	Worcester	United States	Centrum Centres
January 28, 2005	Montreal	Canada	Bell Centre
January 29, 2005	Manchester	United States	Verizon Wireless Arena
January 30, 2005	Buffalo	United States	HSBC Arena
February 1, 2005	London	Canada	John Labatt Centre
February 2, 2005	Toronto	Canada	Air Canada Centre
February 3, 2005	Ottawa	Canada	Corel Centre
February 5, 2005	Pittsburgh	United States	Mellon Arena
February 8, 2005	Saint Paul	United States	Xcel Energy Center
February 9, 2005	Milwaukee	United States	Bradley Center
February 11, 2005	Auburn Hills	United States	The Palace of Auburn Hills
February 12, 2005	Cleveland	United States	Gund Arena
February 13, 2005	Washington, D.C.	United States	MCI Center
February 15, 2005	Grand Rapids	United States	Van Andel Arena
February 17, 2005	Chicago	United States	United Center
February 18, 2005	Columbus	United States	Jerome Schottenstein Center
February 19, 2005	Philadelphia	United States	Wachovia Center
February 20, 2005	Norfolk	United States	Scopes Arena
February 22, 2005	Duluth	United States	Gwinnett Center
February 24, 2005	Jacksonville	United States	Jacksonville Veterans Memorial Arena
February 25, 2005	Orlando	United States	TD Waterhouse Arena
February 26, 2005	Tampa	United States	St. Pete Times Forum
February 27, 2005	Sunrise	United States	Office Depot Center

== Production ==
- Executive producer: Yanni
- Directed by Jerry McReynolds & George Veras.
- Remote and Mobile Production Facilities PMTV
