= Chris Pelcer =

Australian musician

Chris Pelcer is an Australian musician, songwriter, arranger, and record producer who lives in Nashville, Tennessee, United States.

He was born in Sydney, Australia, and grew up in Moruya, on the south coast of New South Wales. After high school, he returned to Sydney to pursue a career in music. He signed to EMI/Castle Music Publishing and WEA (Warner Bros. Records) as a recording artist, and released his debut album Can't Find Reverse. He wrote the theme song to the award-winning Australian television series Simon Townsend's Wonder World, which remained the theme for the duration of the series. He wrote for many international artists before deciding to relocate to Los Angeles, California.

He has written songs for Peter Cetera, Van Zant, Edyta Górniak, Yanni, Leslie Mills, House of Lords, Sandra McCracken, B. J. Thomas, Kari Kimmel, Robin Beck, Tony Vincent, Kesha, Rare Blend, Emmanuel, and Ray Parker Jr. Has also toured with country artist Eddie Arnold, and written for and recorded with producers including Peter Collins, Cowboy Jack Clements, Spencer Lee, Roy Thomas Baker, Keith Olsen, Yanni, Ric Wake, Ray Parker Jr., Wei Chen.

Pelcer now lives in Nashville, Tennessee, and continues to write and produce for artists along with writing/producing songs for film and television, many with long-time collaborator Leslie Mills. His film and television credits include Coyote Ugly, What a Girl Wants, White Oleander, Shall We Dance, My Best Friend's Girl, Barbie and the Three Musketeers, Just My Luck, Las Vegas, Everything You Want, MyScene Goes Hollywood, Barbie of Swan Lake, Gray Matters and more. Number one records including songwriting and or recording production include "La Barajas De Ana" Emmanuel, "One Determined Heart", Paulini Album", "Sensuous Chill, Yanni, "When You Come Back To Me" Edyta Gorniak, "Do You Really" Tony Vincent, "Boom Boom Boom", Coyote Ugly Soundtrack, "Yanni Voices", "My Best Mistake", Chen Bing

Pelcer is also known for his arrangements and musicianship as a guitar player, bass, keyboards, vocals and programming. He has arranged strings for artists such as Rod Stewart and Paul Carrack. He has programmed, engineered, and played on many artists’ recordings. In 2010, Chris co-wrote the music for the iPhone and iPad application called Drums Challenge Charlie Morgan, released by Musigames.
