= Ethnicity (album) =

Studio album by Yanni
- Released: February 11, 2003
- Studios: Yanni's home studio in Florida, US
- Genres: World music, contemporary instrumental
- Length: 57:51
- Label: Virgin
- Producer: Yanni

Yanni chronology
Ultimate Yanni (2003)	Ethnicity (2003)	The Collection (2006)

Ethnicity is the eleventh studio album by Yanni, released on February 11, 2003 by Virgin Records. It peaked at #27 on Billboard's "Top Internet Albums" chart and at #27 on the "Billboard 200" chart in 2003. It also peaked at #1 on the "Top New Age Albums" chart in 2004.

== Background ==
Ethnicity features greater use of vocals, percussion, and exotic rhythms, which were influenced by Yanni's period of travel during his hiatus between 1998 and 2000. As Yanni is unable to read music, he wrote and recorded demos of the album's tracks at his home studio in Florida, after which he employed transcribers and copyists to write the individual parts for the session musicians.

== Reception ==
Professional ratings
Review scores
Source	Rating
AllMusic	(?)

Backroads Music/Heartbeats wrote that the album was musically quite diverse, stating that "Though Yanni is widely known as one of the most popular purveyors of New-age music, there's actually quite a bit going on here."

== Track listing ==
No.	Title	Length
1.	"Rites of Passage"	4:35
2.	"For All Seasons"	5:37
3.	"The Promise"	3:42
4.	"Rainmaker"	5:36
5.	"Written on the Wind"	3:57
6.	"Playing by Heart"	4:37
7.	"At First Sight"	5:14
8.	"Tribal Dream"	5:35
9.	"Almost a Whisper"	3:51
10.	"Never Too Late"	5:01
11.	"Playtime"	5:29
12.	"Jivaeri (Jiva-Eri)"	4:37

== Personnel ==
Music

- All music composed and arranged by Yanni. (except "Jivaeri")
- Pedro Eustache – Flutes, World Reeds, Duduk, Argul, Uilleann pipes, Chanter, and Saxophone.
- Karen Briggs – Violin

Vocals

- Alfreda Gerald (also lead vocals on "The Promise", "Tribal Dream", and "Never Too Late")
- Michelle Amato (also lead vocals on "For All Seasons", "Almost a Whisper", and "Jivaeri")
- Yanni (also lead vocals on "Never Too Late")
- Noelani Brock (also lead vocals on "Written on the Wind")
- Regina Acuna-Williams
- Peter Lehman
- Randy Nichols
- Suzy Park
- Kurt von Schmittou

Lyrics

- Lyrics for "The Promise" and "Almost a Whisper" by Pamela McNeill.

Production

- Engineered and mixed by Yanni at his private studios.
- Assistant engineer: Anthony Stabile
- Mastered by Chris Bellman at Bernie Grundman Mastering, Hollywood, California.
- Recorded and mixed on a Soundtracs DPC-II Digital Console
- All piano tracks were recorded on a Yamaha CFIII 5, 9' Concert Grand

== The Ethnicity concert tour ==
=== Set List ===
- "On Sacred Ground"
- "Felitsa"
- "Keys to Imagination"
- "If I Could Tell You"
- "Playtime"
- "Enchantment"
- "Rainmaker"
- "The Promise"
- "Within Attraction"
- "Aria"

Intermission

- "For All Seasons"
- "Nightingale"
- "Dance with a Stranger"
- "Jivaeri"
- "Never Too Late"
- "Nostalgia"
- "Marching Season"
- "Acroyali/Standing in Motion"
- "Niki Nana"
- "World Dance"
- "Reflections of Passion"
- "Santorini"

=== Featured tour musicians ===
==== Band ====
- Charlie Adams: Drums
- Michelle Amato: Vocalist
- Alfreda Gerald: Vocalist
- Karen Briggs: Violin
- Victor Espinola: Harp
- Pedro Eustache: Flute, Duduk, World WWs, Sop. Sax
- Ric Fierabracci: Bass guitar
- Ramon Flores: Trumpet
- Ming Freeman: Keyboards
- David Hudson: Didgeridoo
- Bradley Joseph: Keyboards
- Dan Landrum: Hammered Dulcimer
- Armen Movsessian: Violin
- Walter Rodriguez: Percussion
- Samvel Yervinyan: Violin

==== Orchestra ====
- Violins: Kristen Autry, Robert Berg, Erica Walczak
- Violas: Eugene Mechtovich, Llona Geller
- Celli: Alexander Zhiroff, Sarah O'Brien
- Harp: April Aoki
- Oboe: April Cap
- French Horns: Jim Mattos, Kristin Morrison
- Trumpets: Kerry Hughes
- Trombones: Wendell Kelly
- Orchestrator: Jeffrey Silverman

=== Tour Production ===
- Personal Management: Danny O'Donovan, Danny O'Donovan Entertainment Group
- Business management: Seven Eight, Inc., Tom Paske, George Veras, Diane Kramer, Anda Allenson, Richard Allenson
- Tour & production manager: Michael Weiss
- Production supervisor: Anthony Stabile
- Personal assistant to Yanni: Don Bath
- Road manager: Craig Yun
- Stage manager: Richard Bray
- Production coordinator: Kathleen Kronauer
- Tour accountant: Richard Allenson
- Tour security: Jason Temke
- Lighting director: Bud Horowitz
- Yanni's wardrobe designed by Nolan Miller
- Costume design/wardrobe: Jennifer Jacobs, Thomas Wells

=== Tour dates ===
Date	City	Country	Venue
North America
March 1, 2003	Las Vegas	United States	Mandalay Bay Events Center
March 3, 2003	Dallas	United States	American Airlines Center
March 6, 2003	Tampa	United States	St. Pete Times Forum
March 7, 2003	Sunrise	United States	Office Depot Center
March 8, 2003	Orlando	United States	Centroplex
March 9, 2003	Jacksonville	United States	Jacksonville Veterans Memorial Arena
March 11, 2003	Atlanta	United States	Philips Arena
March 12, 2003	Nashville	United States	Gaylord Entertainment Center
March 14, 2003	Dayton	United States	Ervin J. Nutter Center
March 15, 2003	Buffalo	United States	HSBC Arena
March 16, 2003	Columbus	United States	Nationwide Arena
March 18, 2003	Indianapolis	United States	Conseco Fieldhouse
March 20, 2003	Toronto	Canada	Air Canada Centre
March 21, 2003	Cleveland	United States	Gund Arena
March 22, 2003	Pittsburgh	United States	Mellon Arena
March 23, 2003	Cincinnati	United States	U.S. Bank Arena
March 25, 2003	Moline	United States	MARK of the Quad Cities
March 27, 2003	Grand Rapids	United States	Van Andel Arena
March 28, 2003	Chicago	United States	United Center
March 29, 2003	Auburn Hills	United States	The Palace of Auburn Hills
March 30, 2003	State College	United States	Bryce Jordan Center
April 1, 2003	Rochester	United States	Blue Cross Arena
April 3, 2003	Boston	United States	Fleet Center
April 4, 2003	Montreal	Canada	Molson Centre
April 5, 2003	Uncasville	United States	Mohegan Sun
April 6, 2003	Manchester	United States	Verizon Wireless Arena
April 8, 2003	Albany	United States	Pepsi Arena
April 10, 2003	East Rutherford	United States	Continental Airlines Arena
April 11, 2003	Washington, D.C.	United States	MCI Center
April 12, 2003	Philadelphia	United States	First Union Center
April 13, 2003	Uniondale	United States	Nassau Veterans Memorial Coliseum
April 15, 2003	Richmond	United States	Richmond Coliseum
April 16, 2003	Wilkes-Barre	United States	First Union Arena
April 17, 2003	New York City	United States	Madison Square Garden
April 25, 2003	Houston	United States	Compaq Center
April 26, 2003	Bossier City	United States	CenturyTel Center
April 27, 2003	Austin	United States	Frank Erwin Center
April 29, 2003	Phoenix	United States	Dodge Theater
April 30, 2003	Phoenix	United States	Dodge Theater
May 2, 2003	San Diego	United States	Cox Arena
May 3, 2003	Anaheim	United States	Arrowhead Pond
May 4, 2003	Los Angeles	United States	Hollywood Bowl
May 6, 2003	Fresno	United States	Selland Arena
May 8, 2003	Sacramento	United States	ARCO Arena
May 9, 2003	Oakland	United States	The Arena in Oakland
May 10, 2003	San Jose	United States	Compaq Center
May 11, 2003	Reno	United States	Lawlor Events Center
May 13, 2003	Salt Lake City	United States	Delta Center
May 15, 2003	Spokane	United States	Spokane Veterans Memorial Arena
May 16, 2003	Portland	United States	Rose Garden Arena
May 17, 2003	Vancouver	Canada	General Motors Place
May 18, 2003	Seattle	United States	KeyArena
May 21, 2003	Denver	United States	Pepsi Center
May 22, 2003	Colorado Springs	United States	World Arena
May 25, 2003	Las Vegas	United States	MGM Grand Las Vegas
May 28, 2003	Ashwaubenon	United States	Resch Center
May 29, 2003	Milwaukee	United States	Bradley Center
May 30, 2003	Saint Paul	United States	Xcel Energy Center
May 31, 2003	Madison	United States	Alliant Energy Center
June 1, 2003	St. Louis	United States	Savvis Center
June 4, 2003	Miami	United States	American Airlines Arena
North America
March 1, 2004	Albuquerque	United States	Tingley Coliseum
March 7, 2004	El Paso	United States	Don Haskins Center
March 9, 2004	San Antonio	United States	SBC Center
March 11, 2004	Oklahoma City	United States	Ford Center
March 12, 2004	Valley Center	United States	Kansas Coliseum
March 13, 2004	Omaha	United States	Qwest Center Omaha
March 14, 2004	Kansas City	United States	Kemper Arena
March 16, 2004	Fort Wayne	United States	Allen County War Memorial Coliseum
March 18, 2004	Champaign	United States	Assembly Hall
March 19, 2004	Louisville	United States	Freedom Hall
March 20, 2004	Knoxville	United States	Thompson–Boling Arena
March 21, 2004	Raleigh	United States	RBC Center
March 22, 2004	North Charleston	United States	North Charleston Coliseum
March 24, 2004	New Orleans	United States	New Orleans Arena
March 25, 2004	Pensacola	United States	Pensacola Civic Center
March 26, 2004	Tallahassee	United States	Leon County Civic Center
March 27, 2004	Lakeland	United States	Lakeland Center
March 28, 2004	Estero	United States	TECO Arena
March 30, 2004	Columbia	United States	Colonial Center
March 31, 2004	Charlotte	United States	Charlotte Coliseum
April 2, 2004	Bridgeport	United States	Arena at Harbor Yard
April 3, 2004	Providence	United States	Dunkin' Donuts Center
April 4, 2004	Portland	United States	Cumberland County Civic Center
April 6, 2004	Syracuse	United States	War Memorial at Oncenter
April 7, 2004	Reading	United States	Sovereign Center
April 8, 2004	Baltimore	United States	1st Mariner Arena

== Certifications and sales ==
Region	Certification	Certified units/sales
United States	—	324,000
