= Steven Humphries =

Steven Humphries may refer to:

- R. Stephen Humphreys, American historian of Southwest Asia and North Africa
- Stephen Humphrey (2013–2021), American politician
- Stephen Humphrey Bogart (born 1949), American writer, producer, and businessman
- Stephen Humphries (fl. 1981), author of Hooligans or Rebels? An Oral History of Working-Class Childhood and Youth, 1889–1939
- Stephen Humphrys (born 1997), English professional footballer
- Steve Humphries (born 1961), English former footballer
