= Dan Landrum =

- Born: 1961 (age 64–65); Kennett, MissouriUnited States
- Instrument: Hammered dulcimer

Dan Landrum (born 1961 in Kennett, Missouri) is an American hammered dulcimer player residing in Chattanooga, Tennessee. He was discovered busking in front of the Tennessee Aquarium and is a featured member of Yanni's touring orchestra. He began touring with Yanni during the 2003/2004 Ethnicity world tour and also appears on the 2006 live album and video Yanni Live! The Concert Event.

In November 2006 Dan Landrum became the owner and editor of "Dulcimer Players News" after purchasing the magazine from Madeline MacNeil.

== Discography ==
- Turning Point (2002)
- Questions in the Calm
- Hammer On! (with Hammer On!) (2004)
- For the Beauty (with Hannah Carson)
- Winter Mix (2005)
- Landrum & Humphries (with Stephen Humphries) (2006)
