= In the Mirror (album) =

- Europe release cover

Compilation album by Yanni
- Released: April 15, 1997
- Recorded: 1986–1993
- Genre: Instrumental
- Length: 62:41
- Label: Private Music
- Producer: Yanni

Yanni chronology
Live at Royal Albert Hall (1995)	In the Mirror (1997)	Port of Mystery (1997)

In the Mirror is a compilation album by keyboardist and composer Yanni, released on the Private Music label in 1997. The album peaked at number 1 on Billboard's Top New Age Albums chart and at number 17 on the Billboard 200 chart in the same year.

== Background ==
This compilation is often billed as a Compilation of Yanni favorites. It includes "In the Mirror" which is a solo piano piece and faster -paced tracks such as "Forbidden Dreams" and "Chasing Shadows". "Aria" is specially presented in this album as performed in concert on the album Live at the Acropolis.

== Critical reception ==
Professional ratings
Review scores
Source	Rating
AllMusic	3/5 stars

In a review by Jonathan Widran of AllMusic: "Perhaps Private Music thought it could fool the casual Yanni fan by continuously releasing of various collections by the New-age superstar, but the buyer should beware that a good handful of songs from this collection are also available on the recording Devotion: The Best of Yanni. Should you not already have that one, In the Mirror makes for a good introduction to the man and his music, both for its quieter romantic aspects (the title track, the acoustic piano gem 'In the Morning Light') and more rambunctious synth adventures ('Within Attraction'). While many simply think Yanni composes overly sweet, featherweight themes and floats them over synth strings, there's sometimes a slightly richer artistry at work here. 'Enchantment', for instance, is classically influenced, while 'So Long My Friend' and 'The End of August' are truly thoughtful elegies that run deeper than most of his compositions. His most familiar tunes, like 'A Love for Life' and 'Face in the Photograph', are on hand as well, as is the live version of the exotic, slightly bombastic chant tune, 'Aria'. This disc being quintessential Yanni, his fans will love it while detractors...well, maybe they should be looking in a slightly different mirror".

== Track listing ==
All tracks are written by Yanni.

No.	Title	Original album	Length
1.	"In the Mirror"	Dare to Dream (1992)	4:07
2.	"In the Morning Light"	In My Time (1993)	3:49
3.	"A Love for Life"	Dare to Dream	5:07
4.	"One Man's Dream"	In My Time	2:43
5.	"Within Attraction"	Out of Silence (1987)	4:09
6.	"Forbidden Dreams"	Keys to Imagination (1986)	3:57
7.	"Once Upon a Time"	Dare to Dream	3:51
8.	"Chasing Shadows"	Chameleon Days (1988)	5:42
9.	"Aria"	Live at the Acropolis (1994)	3:58
10.	"Quiet Man"	Niki Nana (1989)	4:32
11.	"Enchantment"	In My Time	3:51
12.	"So Long My Friend"	Dare to Dream	3:47
13.	"Before I Go"	In My Time	4:30
14.	"The End of August"	In My Time	4:51
15.	"Face in the Photograph"	Dare to Dream	3:47
Total length:			62:41

== Certifications ==
Region	Certification	Certified units/sales
Canada (Music Canada)	Gold	50,000^{^}
New Zealand (RMNZ)	Gold	7,500^{^}
United States (RIAA)	Gold	500,000^{^}
^{^} Shipments figures based on certification alone.
