= Nightbird =

Nightbird may refer to:

- Strisores, a group of birds sometimes called "nightbirds"
- "Nightbird" (song), a 1983 song by Stevie Nicks
- "Nightbird", a 1975 song by Kalapana
- "Nightbird", a song by SZA released on SoundCloud alongside "I Hate U" (2021)
- Nightbird (Paul Carrack album), released in 1980
- Nightbird (Yanni album), released in 1997
- Nightbird (Erasure album), released in 2005
- Nightbird (Eva Cassidy album), released in 2015
- Nightbird (Transformers), a Transformers character
- Alison Steele, a New York disk jockey known as "The Nightbird"
- Nightbirde, the stage name for singer Jane Kristen Marczewsk

== See also ==
- Nightbirds, a 1974 album by Labelle
- Night Birds (disambiguation)
