= Ultimate Yanni =

2003 compilation album by Yanni

Compilation album by Yanni
- Released: January 21, 2003
- Genre: Contemporary instrumental
- Length: 130:52
- Label: BMG Heritage
- Producer: Yanni

Yanni chronology
The Very Best of Yanni (2000)	Ultimate Yanni (2003)	Ethnicity (2003)

Ultimate Yanni is a compilation album by keyboardist and composer Yanni, released on the BMG Heritage label in 2003. The album peaked at #1 on Billboard's "Top New Age Albums" chart in 2004 and at #74 on the "Billboard 200" in 2003.

== Background ==
This album collects the highlights of Yanni's best-selling albums including Optimystique, Reflections of Passion, Dare to Dream, In My Time and a special version from his live album Live at the Acropolis. This is a remastered recordings.

== Critical reception ==
Professional ratings
Review scores
Source	Rating
AllMusic	5/5 stars

In a review by Heather Phares of AllMusic, "The most complete retrospective of Yanni's work since Devotion: The Best of Yanni in 1997 and The Very Best of Yanni in 2000, Ultimate Yanni comes close to living up to its title. The double-disc, 24-track set features digitally remastered versions of definitive songs like "Marching Season", "To the One Who Knows", "Reflections of Passion", "Aria", "Santorini" and "Flight of Fantasy", and also includes tracks from his earliest albums as well as his compositions for the Olympics, Tour de France, and Wide World of Sports."

== Track listing ==
Disc 1

No.	Title	Length
1.	"You Only Live Once"	7:18
2.	"Flight of Fantasy"	5:39
3.	"To the One Who Knows"	5:36
4.	"Keys to Imagination"	5:13
5.	"Butterfly Dance"	6:24
6.	"Nice to Meet You"	5:33
7.	"Santorini"	6:47
8.	"Nostalgia"	5:37
9.	"Aria"	3:58
10.	"Point of Origin"	5:55
11.	"Nightbird"	5:59
12.	"Chasing Shadows"	5:42

Disc 2

No.	Title	Length
1.	"Paths of Water"	3:50
2.	"Marching Season"	4:33
3.	"Reflections of Passion"	4:33
4.	"Looking Glass"	6:38
5.	"A Word in Private"	3:43
6.	"One Man's Dream"	2:43
7.	"Felitsa"	4:51
8.	"In the Mirror"	4:01
9.	"Desire"	4:57
10.	"The Rain Must Fall"	7:27
11.	"Running Time"	5:56
12.	"Forbidden Dreams"	3:55

== Production ==
- Compilation Produced by Rob Santos
- Compiled by John Dilberto
- Mastered by Elliott Federman at Saje Sound, NYC
- Product Manager: John Hudson
- Design: Smay Vision
- Photography: Lynn Goldsmith
- Project Coordination: Laura Dorson, Jeremy Holiday, Stephanie Kika, Sue Raffman and BettyAnn Rizzo
- Thanks to Stacey Bain, Josie DiChiara, Joe DiMuro, Mandana Eidgah, Dean Haymeyer, Pete Jones, Mike Mjehovich, Alex Miller, Gary Newman, Steve Orselet, Stuart Pressman, Roseann Rizzo, Christoper Ross, Vicky Sarro and David Weyner

(Production as described in CD liner notes.)
