= Leslie Mills =

American singer-songwriter

- Born: Kentucky, United States
- Genres: Pop, pop rock, alternative rock
- Occupations: Actress, film producer, singer, songwriter, record producer
- Years active: 2000–present
- Labels: Atlantic, Disney, A&M, Tiny Violet Records
- Website: www.lesliemills.com

Leslie Mills is an American actress, film producer, singer, songwriter, and record producer.

== Music career ==
Originally from Kentucky and based in Nashville, Mills grew up studying dance, theater, and music. She got her start fronting the New York-based band to the Moon Alice with A&M Records before relocating to Nashville to begin her solo career. Mills met her long-time collaborating partner, the Australian writer/producer Chris Pelcer and began writing songs for her solo project along with co-writing the single "Just Like Love" for Peter Cetera, and "Rule The World" for Cetera's album Another Perfect World. Mills also co-wrote the title track and single One Determined Heart for Australian artist Paulini, which debuted at number one on the ARIA Charts and certified platinum by the ARIA (Australian Recording Industry Association).

=== Atlantic and MPL ===
Mills signed as a writer to Paul McCartney's publishing company MPL and received an Emmy Nomination for the song On My Own. She signed with Atlantic Records, and released her debut album Different for Girls which included producers such as David Kahne, John Shanks, and co-productions by Mills and Pelcer. While signed to Atlantic Records, Mills began to get her songs into film and soundtracks such as What A Girl Wants, White Oleander, and The Powerpuff Girls Movie. She left Atlantic Records, and continued to write songs for television and film while working on her second album Everlasting Road which was released on her own label Tiny Violet Records.

Other film and TV credits for Mills' songs include Going in Style, Overboard, Barbie of Swan Lake, My Scene Goes Hollywood: The Movie, Gray Matters, My Best Friend's Girl, Just My Luck, Las Vegas.

=== Yanni Voices ===
Mills was a featured artist as part of the Yanni Voices tour of US, Canada, and Mexico. She wrote and recorded for the project with the musical artist Yanni for two years. Four songs featuring Mills are included on the Yanni Voices album Disney Pearl, along with Mills' featured in the PBS special Yanni Voices Live From the Forum in Acapulco which aired in the U.S. in March 2009, with a full-length DVD released in October of the same year. Mills also wrote and performed two songs on Yanni's album Truth of Touch in 2011. She also had songs featured on Yanni's album Sensuous Chill in 2016.

== Acting career ==
Mills has acted in television and numerous independent film projects. She appeared on ABC's Nashville, and had a recurring role on Drop Dead Diva's final season. Her film credits include: Strategy & Pursuit (2018), Tunnel Vision, The Identical, and the indie award-winning Wild Sands.

=== Film production ===
Mills produced the feature film Talon Falls. (2017)

== Discography ==
=== Studio albums ===
- Different for Girls (2003)
- Everlasting Road (2007)
- Falling Off The World (2009)
- Winter's Garden (2017) Single.

=== Songs in film and TV ===
- Overboard 2018 "Leave the Light On" performed by Leslie Mills, written by Leslie Mills & Mark Cofer
- "Going in Style" "Long Walk Out" Performed by Leslie Mills, Written by Leslie Mills, Chris Pelcer (2017)
- "The Swan Princess" "Born To Be Me" Written by Leslie Mills, Chris Pelcer, J Bateman, Performed by Macy Kate, Sam Tsui (2017)
- "The Swan Princess: Princess Tomorrow, Pirate Today" "I'll Be Your Star" Written by Leslie Mills, Chris Pelcer, J Bateman, Performed by Macy Kate (2016)
- You're So Cupid Songs Performed by Leslie Mills: "Higher" (Leslie Mills/Andy West), "Another Side of Me"(Mills/Pelcer), "Danceparty" (Mills/Pelcer) (2010)
- Barbie and the Three Musketeers Song: "Making My Way" Performed by Leslie Mills, Written by Mills/Chris Pelcer(2009)
- My Best Friend's Girl Song:"Tell Me You Will" Performed by Leslie Mills, Written by Mills/Pelcer (2008)
- 'Live!' Song: "Never Leave The Sun" Performed by Leslie Mills, Written by Mills/Pelcer (2007)
- Just My Luck Song: "All About A Kiss" Performed by Chantal Kreviazuk, Written by Leslie Mills / Chris Pelcer (2006)
- Outlaw Trail: The Treasure of Butch Cassidy Song: "Away We'll Ride" Performed by Leslie Mills, Written by Mills/Pelcer (2006)
- Gray Matters Song: "All Kinds of Love" Performed by Leslie Mills, Written by Mills/Pelcer (2006)
- Everything You Want Song: "Ready to Rain" Performed by Leslie Mills, Written by Mills/Pelcer (2005)
- My Scene Goes Hollywood: The Movie Songs: "I Feel Like L.A." Performed by Leslie Mills, Written & Produced by Mills/Pelcer, "Find the Fun" Performed by Leslie Mills, Written & Produced by Mills/Pelcer, "Starlight" Performed by Leslie Mills, Written & Produced by Mills/Pelcer, "Lucky" Performed by Leslie Mills, Written & Produced by Mills/Pelcer
- My Scene: Jammin' in Jamaica Songs: "Making My Way" Performed by Leslie Mills, Written by Mills/Pelcer, "Radiowave", Performed by Leslie Mills, Written by Mills/Pelcer (2004)
- What A Girl Wants Song: "Good Life" Performed by Leslie Mills, Written by Mills/Pelcer (2003)
- Barbie of Swan Lake Song: "Wings" Performed by Leslie Mills, Written by Jason Blume (2003)
- White Oleander Song: "Good Life" Performed by Leslie Mills, Written by Mills/Pelcer (2002)
- Las Vegas – "Melting" (2007)
- America's Next Top Model – "Blue" (2010)
- Beauty and the Beast – "I Will Always Believe"
- Guiding Light – "On My Own"
- Guiding Light – "Be My Water"

=== Soundtracks and compilations ===
- "Swan Princess" (2017)
- "Swan Princess: Princess Tomorrow, Pirate Today" (2016)
- Feel Like LA: The Hollywood Collection (2009)
- Barbie in A Perfect Christmas Soundtrack (2010)
- Barbie In A Christmas Carol Soundtrack (2008)
- Everything You Want Soundtrack (2005)
- Barbie Sings!: The Princess Movie Songs Collection (2004)
- What A Girl Wants Soundtrack (2003)
- Powerpuff Girls: Power Pop (2003)

=== Songs on other albums ===
- Yanni's "Sensuous Chill" (2016)
- Yanni's Truth Of Touch Songs: "Can't Wait" and "Long Way Home" (Instrumental) (2011)
- Yanni Voices Song: "Before The Night Ends" (2009)
- Yanni Voices Song: "The Keeper" (2009)
- Yanni Voices Song: "Never Leave The Sun" (2009)
- Yanni Voices Song: "Our Days" (2009)
- Peter Cetera Songs: "Just Like Love" and "Rule The World" (2001)
- Paulini Song: "One Determined Heart" (Title Track) (2002) (Australia)
- Steve Nelson Song: "Be My Water" (2002)
- Shanley Del Song: "The Other Side of Love" (2002) (Australia)

== Awards and nominations ==
- 2002: Emmy nomination for Outstanding Original Song, "On My Own" for "Guiding Light" (shared with Brian Siewert)
- 2013: Tennessee Spirit Award for Short Narrative Film "Wild Sands" starring Leslie Mills, at the Nashville Film Festival
