= Different for Girls =

Different for Girls may refer to:

- Different for Girls (film), a 1996 film starring Rupert Graves and Steven Mackintosh
- Different for Girls (album), a 2003 album by Leslie Mills
- "Different for Girls" (Doctors), a 2003 television episode
- "Different for Girls" (song), a 2016 song by Dierks Bentley
- "Different for Girls", a 2013 song by Gavin DeGraw from Make a Move

== See also ==
- "It's Different for Girls", 1979 song by Joe Jackson
- "It's Different for Girls" (Friday Night Lights), a 2006 television episode
- "It's Different for Girls", a 2016 song by of Montreal from Innocence Reaches
