= In the Mirror =

In the Mirror may refer to:

- In the Mirror (album), by Yanni, 1997
  - "In the Mirror", the title song, originally from Romantic Moments, 1992
- "In the Mirror", a song by Demi Lovato from the soundtrack of the film Eurovision Song Contest: The Story of Fire Saga, 2020
- "In the Mirror", a song by the Saints from The Monkey Puzzle, 1981
