= Super Hits (Yanni album) =

Greatest hits album by Yanni
- Released: May 22, 2007
- Genre: Instrumental
- Length: 44:08
- Label: Sony BMG
- Producer: Yanni

Yanni chronology
Yanni Live! The Concert Event (2006)	Super Hits (2007)	Collections (2008)

Professional ratings
Review scores
Source	Rating
AllMusic	(?)

Super Hits is a compilation album by keyboardist and composer Yanni, released by Sony BMG in 2007. The album peaked at No. 9 on Billboard's "Top New Age Albums" chart in the same year.

== Track listing ==
No.	Title	Length
1.	"Aria"	3:58
2.	"Days of Summer"	4:22
3.	"Standing in Motion"	5:20
4.	"Whispers in the Dark"	5:24
5.	"Looking Glass"	6:35
6.	"Face in the Photograph"	3:47
7.	"After the Sunrise"	4:38
8.	"Santorini"	4:34
9.	"Forbidden Dreams"	3:57
10.	"The Magus"	4:45
