= Vann Johnson =

American singer (1960 - 2017)

- Born: November 13, 1960; Flint, Michigan, United States
- Died: September 27, 2017 (aged 56) Los Angeles, California, United States
- Genres: R&B, gospel, pop, new-age
- Occupation: Vocalist
- Years active: 1981–2014
- Formerly of: See below

Vann Johnson (November 13, 1960 – September 27, 2017) was an American singer who toured or recorded with artists such as Michael Bolton, Neil Young, The Temptations, and Yanni. She appeared as a featured vocalist in Yanni's live concert album and video, Tribute, in which she sang his first-ever song with completely English lyrics, "Love Is All". She was a featured member of the house band, The Groove, for the television show The Singing Bee.

Vann Johnson died on September 27, 2017, at age 56, due to cancer.

== Discography ==
- Messages (1999)
