= Nightbird (Yanni album) =

Compilation album by Yanni
- Released: October 28, 1997
- Genre: Contemporary instrumental
- Length: 36:25
- Label: Unison
- Producer: Yanni

Yanni chronology
Devotion: The Best of Yanni (1997)	Nightbird (1997)	Tribute (1997)

Professional ratings
Review scores
Source	Rating
Allmusic	3/5 stars

Nightbird is a compilation album by keyboardist and composer Yanni, released on the Unison label in 1997. It peaked at #5 on Billboard's "Top New Age Albums" chart in the same year.

== Background ==
Nightbird is a collection of rare and never before released recordings by Yanni, sparkles with imagination, flair and is sure to put a pulse in the bloodstream of even the casual listener. Being a skeptic, one will find a soothing yet orchestral wonder within the framework of each of Yanni's recordings.

All songs except "Nightbird" have previously been released. Although the above is a quote from a review at AllMusic, the liner notes of the CD actually say the following: Nightbird: A Collection of Yanni favorites including "Chasing Shadows" and "Days of Summer".

"Chasing Shadows" is not included on the album. "Marching Season" is included at track 5 instead, and is listed as "Chasing Shadows" in the liner notes.

== Track listing ==
All tracks are written by Yanni

No.	Title	Original album	Length
1.	"The North Shore of Matsushima"	Keys to Imagination (1986)	5:10
2.	"Point of Origin"	Out of Silence (1987)	5:58
3.	"Within Attraction"	Out of Silence	4:11
4.	"Dance with a Stranger"	Niki Nana (1989)	5:02
5.	"Marching Season" (Incorrectly labeled as “Chasing Shadows” on the track listing)	Chameleon Days (1988)	5:38
6.	"Days of Summer"	Chameleon Days	4:25
7.	"Nightbird"	Niki Nana	6:01
Total length:			36:25
