= A Collection of Romantic Themes =

Compilation album by Yanni
- Released: 1994
- Genres: Contemporary instrumental Easy listening New-age
- Length: 29:19
- Label: Private Music
- Producer: Yanni

Yanni chronology
| Live at the Acropolis (1994) | A Collection of Romantic Themes (1994) | I Love You Perfect (1995) |

A Collection of Romantic Themes is a compilation album by keyboardist Yanni, released on the Private Music label in 1994.

This compilation consists of tracks from his 1992 Grammy-nominated album Dare to Dream and his 1993 follow-up album In My Time as well as from Reflections of Passion and Live at the Acropolis.

This album is no longer in print.

== Track listing ==
| No. | Title | Original Album | Length |
|---|---|---|---|
| 1. | "Face in the Photograph" | Dare to Dream | 3:48 |
| 2. | "To the One Who Knows" | Dare to Dream | 5:39 |
| 3. | "Enchantment" | In My Time | 3:54 |
| 4. | "The End of August" | In My Time | 4:55 |
| 5. | "Almost a Whisper" | Reflections of Passion | 3:11 |
| 6. | "True Nature" | Reflections of Passion | 4:31 |
| 7. | "One Man's Dream" | Live at the Acropolis | 3:25 |

== Production ==
- Engineered and mixed by Yanni at his private studios
- Mastered at Bernie Grundman Mastering, Los Angeles
- Produced and Manufactured exclusively for Dayton Hudson. Corporation
- Distributed by BMG Distribution.

(Production as described in CD liner notes.)
