= Pamela McNeill =

American singer-songwriter

- Born: Winona, Minnesota; United States
- Occupation: Singer-songwriter
- Instruments: Piano keyboards harmonica
- Website: pamelamcneill.com

Pamela NcNeill is an American singer-songwriter. She grew up in Winona, Minnesota. She studied classical music for 16 years and joined her first rock and roll band playing throughout the Midwest at the age of 16. McNeill has written songs for many artists such as Wynonna Judd. She wrote the lyrics to "Love is All" - from Yanni's 1997 multi platinum album Tribute as well as "The Promise" and "Almost a Whisper" for Yanni's 2003 album, Ethnicity. She has released 7 studio albums of original music, including 2019's "Solitary" - recorded in Nashville, TN. In 2022 she signed with "Farm to Label Records" an independent record label formed by drummer John Richardson (Gin Blossoms). She lives in the Minneapolis, MN area with her husband, Wealth Enhancement Group founder and major Twin Cities Television and Radio station WCCO's financial expert, Bruce Helmer.

== Discography ==
- 2 Sides to Every Sky (1998)
- American Breakup (2002)
- Nightingale (2007)
- Heartaches and Miracles (2010)
- Hurtsville, USA (2014)
- Solitary (2019)
- Neon Lightning (2022) (Farm to Label Records) http://www.farmtolabelrecords.com/
