= David Hudson (musician) =

Australian musician (born c. 1962)

- Born: David Charles Hudson c. 1962 (age 63–64)
- Origin: Cairns, Queensland, Australia
- Genres: Country, folk
- Occupations: Entertainer, musician, artist
- Instruments: Didgeridoo, vocals
- Years active: 1985–present
- Labels: Celestial Harmonies, Indigenous Australia, Australian Sun
- Website: davidhudson.com.au

David Charles Hudson (born c. 1962) is an Australian musician, entertainer and artist. Hudson is a multi-instrumentalist and was taught to play traditional didgeridoo (yidaki) from an early age. He also plays guitar, kit drums and percussion. Hudson plays primarily traditional music, as well as more ambient music, country-folk, rock, and new age.

== Life and career ==
Hudson was born in the early 1960s and is a descendant of the Ewamin-Western Yalanji peoples of the western Far North Queensland region. He explained "I grew up in a household with uncles and aunts who painted and carved. I was taught traditional stories, so I was painting stories, and I learned what this line represents and this dot represents." He was also taught to play traditional didgeridoo. Hudson finished secondary schooling in 1979, then attended a teachers' college and was qualified as a recreation officer. According to Hudson "the majority of Indigenous teenagers left school in year 10 and followed their fathers and grandfathers to work on railways, in construction or on cane fields."

In 1987 Hudson, his wife Cindy Judd, and other partners, established the Tjapukai Dance Theatre and the related Tjapukai Aboriginal Cultural Park in Kuranda. Hudson, as a dancer and musician, toured with Greek-American musician, Yanni, from 1996 to 2005 and appears on the artist's albums, Tribute (November 1997), Ethnicity (February 2003) and Yanni Live! The Concert Event (August 2006). From 1997 to 2012 Hudson was General Manager of the Tjapukai Aboriginal Cultural Park.

Hudson worked on the film The Island of Dr. Moreau and played the role of the Bison Man, hybrid human-animal.

In 2013, Hudson consulted for Dreamworld on the Gold Coast as cultural advisor, choreographer and script writer.

On 26 March 2014 Hudson was given an Honorary Doctorate from James Cook University, in Cairns, for his outstanding service and distinguished public contribution to the Queensland community.

In October 2014 Hudson gave a TEDx talk titled "Have Didge will Travel" at TEDxJCUCairns. Hudson's talk explained how a boy once classified by the Government as fauna, grew up and is now able to spread a positive message about Aboriginal culture, especially through his passion for the didgeridoo.

Hudson continues to undertake motivational speaking, cultural workshops, original paintings and making customised didgeridoos.

In April 2018 Hudson performed at the official opening of the Sir John Monash Centre at Villers-Bretonneux in France. He presented the didgeridoo he had made for the occasion to Prime Minister Turnbull for inclusion in the museum.

== Discography ==
- Undara Dawn, 1988
- Touching the Sounds of Australia, 1988
- Australia: Sound of the Earth (by David Hudson, Steve Roach and Sarah Hopkins), Fortuna, February 1991
- Woolunda, Celestial Harmonies, 1993
- Rainbow Serpent – Music for Didgeridoo & Percussion, Celestial Harmonies (13096-2), September 1994
- Bedarra, 1996.
- Didgeridoo Spirit, September 1996
- Guardians of the Reef, November 1996.
- Heart of Australia, Indigenous Australia (IA2001D), November 1996
- The Art of Didgeridoo: Selected Pieces 1987–1997, 1997
- Bama Muralug: Aboriginal and Torres Strait Traditional Songs, February 1997
- Kuranda, February 1997
- The Sound of Gondwana: 176,000 Years in the Making (with Alan Dargin, Matthew Doyle, and Mark Atkins), Black Sun, February 1997
- Spirit in the Sky, February 1997
- Wangetti, February 1997
- Yigi Yigi: Solo Didgeridoo, February 1997
- Gudju Gudju, 1998
- Gunyal, Black Sun, March 1998.
- Walkabout, Indigenous Australia, 1999
- The Stolen Generation – Rosie’s Freedom, April 2000
- Australian Sun Records (partners David Hudson, Nigel Pegrum and Mark Mannock)
- Just Like a Dream, 2002
- Australian Savannah, February 2002
- Coolamon, February 2002
- Passions of the Reef, February 2002
- Postcard from David Hudson, February 2002
- Just a Dream, September 2002
- Castaway, May 2004
- Spirit Songs of the Great Barrier Reef, June 2005
- Woolunda Vol.2, 14 March 2006
- Very Best of David Hudson, August 2006
- Didgeralia, 2007
- The Naked Melody, July 2007
- Ooramin: the Meditative Digeridoo, 10 July 2007
- Jinna Jinna: Australian Aboriginal Dreamtime Stories, Australian Sun Records (ASR1001), July 2007
- Primal Elegance Didgeridoo/Piano with Mark Mannock, August 2007
- DreamRoads Country Rock, September 2007

Credits:
