= Alexander Zhiroff =

- Origin: Russia
- Genres: classical, new age
- Instrument: Cello

Alexander "Sasha" Zhiroff (born 13 April 1951 in Ishim, Soviet Union) is a Russian cellist whose performing career has included appearances as a soloist with orchestras in the United States, Russia, Cuba, recitals in major concert halls, and recordings as a soloist for BBC Scotland, Gostelradio (Russia), and EGREM (Cuba). In 1996 he became a member of Yanni's orchestra, performing at the Taj Mahal in India and the Forbidden City in China during the Tribute concert in 1997, and the corresponding tour for the next year, The Tribute 1998 World Tour, the 2003 and 2004 Ethnicity world tours, as well as the 2005 Yanni Live! The Concert Event and Yanni Voices tours. Zhiroff also appears on Sarah Stanton's album, A Glimpse of Heaven. In 2005 he joined a genre- crossing group called Classical Edge (Trio Records). Their debut CD Edge, contains music from Argentinian Tango to American Jazz.
