= Live at Royal Albert Hall (Yanni video) =

1995 Yanni film

Video by Yanni
- Released: 1995
- Recorded: November 1995
- Genres: Instrumental; New-age
- Length: 53:00
- Label: Private Music
- Producer: Yanni

Yanni chronology
I Love You Perfect (1995)	Live at Royal Albert Hall (1995)	In the Mirror (1997)

Live at Royal Albert Hall is the second concert film by Yanni, recorded in November 1995 at the Royal Albert Hall and featuring the Royal Albert Hall Organ in performance with Yanni's own symphony orchestra. The corresponding concert tour for 1995 was Yanni Live, The Symphony Concerts 1995.

== Track listing ==
No.	Title	Length
1.	"Desire"
2.	"Dance With A Stranger"
3.	"A Love For Life"
4.	"Within Attraction"
5.	"Reflections Of Passion"
6.	"Aria (Ode To Humanity)"
7.	"Nostalgia"

== Yanni Live, 1995 World Tour ==
=== Band ===
- Charlie Adams – drums
- Karen Briggs – violin
- Lynn Davis – vocals
- Fran Logan – vocals
- Pedro Eustache – flutes, chorus in Niki Nana
- Ric Fierabracci – bass guitar
- Ming Freeman – keyboards
- Daniel de los Reyes – percussion
- David Kennedy – didgeridoo

=== Conductor ===
- Armen Anassian – conductor, violin soloist

=== Orchestra ===
- Clif Foster – first violin, concertmaster
- Jim Shallenberger – first violin
- Dana Freeman – first violin, chorus in Niki Nana
- Will Logan – first violin
- Pam Moore – first violin
- Rhonni Hallman – first violin
- Julie Metz – first violin
- Vivian Wolf – first violin, chorus in Niki Nana
- Neal Laite – second violin
- Marilyn Harding – second violin
- Ann Lasley – second violin, chorus in Niki Nana
- Delia Park – second violin, chorus in Niki Nana
- Cheryl Ongaro – second violin
- Jonathan Dysart – second violin
- Desiree Hume – second violin
- Lynn Grants – viola
- Cathy Paynter – viola, chorus in Niki Nana
- Diane Reedy – viola
- Helen Crosby – viola, chorus in Niki Nana
- Sarah O'Brien – cello
- Maurice Grants – cello
- John Krovoza – cello
- Lisa Pribanic – cello
- Gary Lasley – contrabass, chorus in Niki Nana
- Cheryl Foster – oboe
- Jim Foschia – clarinet
- April Aoki – harp
- Matt Reynolds – French horn, chorus in Niki Nana
- Jim Avery – French horn
- James Mattos – French horn
- Ron Applegate – French horn, chorus in Niki Nana
- Ray Brown – trumpet, flugelhorn
- Kerry Hughes – trumpet
- Rich Berkeley – trombone
- Dana Hughes – trombone and bass trombone

== Production ==
- Executive producer – Yanni
- Produced by – George Veras, Yanni
- Directed by – Kate Ferris
- Music video producer/director – George Veras
- Music video technical producer – Brian Powers, PMTV
- Lighting Designers – Lee Rose, David Kaniski
