= Catte Adams =

American singer-songwriter

- Genres: Pop; new-age
- Occupations: Singer, songwriter, author
- Website: www.catteadams.com

Catte Adams is an American singer-songwriter who has toured or recorded with artists such as Bill Medley, Neil Young, Natalie Cole, and Chaka Khan, and appears on Yanni's live concert video, Tribute. She came to national prominence as the second season winner of Star Search, which led to appearances on The Tonight Show with Johnny Carson and The Arsenio Hall Show. She has been the opening act for notable celebrities such as George Burns, Don Rickles, and Jay Leno.
