= Night Birds =

Night Birds may refer to:

- Night Birds (album), a 1982 album by Shakatak, or the title track
- Night Birds (film), a 1930 British thriller film
- Night Birds (band), an American punk rock band

== See also ==
- Nightbird (disambiguation)
