= The Collection (Yanni album) =

Box set by Yanni
- Released: June 13, 2006
- Genre: Instrumental
- Length: 155:43
- Label: Private Music
- Producer: Yanni

Yanni chronology
Ethnicity (2003)	The Collection (2006)	Yanni Live! The Concert Event (2006)

Professional ratings
Review scores
Source	Rating
AllMusic	3/5 stars

The Collection is a three disc box set by Yanni, released on the Private Music label in 2006. The set contains three of Yanni's original album's on three discs. The albums included are In Celebration of Life, Dare to Dream, and In My Time.

== Track listing ==
Disc 1: In Celebration of Life (1991)

No.	Title	Length
1.	"Santorini"	4:34
2.	"Song for Antarctica"	4:23
3.	"Marching Season"	5:34
4.	"Walkabout"	4:32
5.	"Keys to Imagination"	5:13
6.	"Looking Glass"	6:35
7.	"Someday"	4:34
8.	"Within Attraction"	4:12
9.	"Standing in Motion"	5:20
10.	"Sand Dance"	5:10

Disc 2: Dare to Dream (1992)

No.	Title	Length
1.	"Once Upon a Time"	3:51
2.	"A Love for Life"	5:07
3.	"Nice to Meet You"	5:35
4.	"So Long My Friend"	3:47
5.	"You Only Live Once"	7:19
6.	"To the One Who Knows"	5:37
7.	"Face in the Photograph"	3:47
8.	"Felitsa"	4:45
9.	"Desire"	5:00
10.	"Aria" (based on the 19th century French opera, Lakmé, by Léo Delibes.)	3:58
11.	"A Night to Remember"	5:47
12.	"In the Mirror"	4:07

Disc 3: In My Time (1993)

No.	Title	Length
1.	"In the Morning Light"	3:49
2.	"One Man's Dream"	2:43
3.	"Before I Go"	4:30
4.	"Enchantment"	3:51
5.	"The End of August"	4:51
6.	"To Take... To Hold"	4:01
7.	"In the Mirror"	4:04
8.	"Felitsa"	4:51
9.	"Whispers in the Dark"	5:24
10.	"Only a Memory"	4:15
11.	"Until the Last Moment"	6:22
