= Tribute (Yanni album) =

Live album and concert film by Yanni
- Released: November 4, 1997
- Recorded: March and May 1997
- Venues: Taj Mahal, India; Forbidden City, China
- Genre: Instrumental
- Length: 67:13
- Label: Virgin Records
- Producer: Yanni

Yanni chronology
Nightbird (1997)	Tribute (1997)	Forbidden Dreams: Encore Collection, Volume 2 (1998)

Tribute is the second live album and third concert film by Greek keyboardist and songwriter Yanni, released in November 1997 on Virgin Records. It was recorded at the Taj Mahal, India in March 1997 and the Forbidden City, China, in May 1997, both featuring Yanni performing with a seven-piece band, choir, and 27-piece orchestra.

Tribute went to No. 1 on the Billboard Top New Age Album chart and No. 21 on the Billboard 200. The concert film was released in December 1997. In March 1998, the album was certified platinum by the Recording Industry Association of America (RIAA) for selling one million copies in the US. Yanni supported the album with the Tribute World Tour between January and July 1998, after which he put his career on a two-year hiatus.

== Background ==
In 1994, Yanni released his first live album, Live at the Acropolis, which saw him perform with his band and orchestra at the Herodes Atticus Theatre in his native Greece. It became his best selling album of his career with 4 million copies sold in the US alone. Yanni was influenced to perform at such locations while visiting his father in Greece following the success of the Acropolis concerts, who thought it was a shame "After going so far with my music, not to take it all the way around the world." This led to Yanni's desire to stage concerts at other historic sites and the decision to perform in India and China, which he said took around two-and-a-half years to plan and cost around $4 million.

The shows at the Taj Mahal took place on three nights in March 1997, as part of celebrations around the fiftieth anniversary of Indian independence. A temporary concert site was constructed which involved the Indian army building bridges across the River Yamuna. The shows included a light display that marked the first time the monument was illuminated at night. The concerts were met with some protests against them, claiming the lighting and sound systems would harm the building and its surroundings. Some local farmers went so far to threaten to immolate themselves on the site, until a financial settlement between them, the Indian government, and Yanni was agreed upon. Yanni later said that the reports of immolation were rumours that were generated by the political dispute, and that he had met a group of local farmers and had tea with them which he said helped defuse the situation. "And they said 'no, we're not crazy.'" The Supreme Court of India threw out a case filed by the Archaeological Survey of India that tried to cancel the shows. A portion of the receipts was donated toward conserving the Taj Mahal, which is affected by smoke and brick kilns. The second concert was broadcast live on Indian television. Yanni was particularly nervous about presenting a setlist of new music and whether the Indian public thought what he did was "appropriate and respectful toward the monument."

The shows at the Forbidden City followed in May 1997 and took place at the courtyard at the Imperial Ancestral Temple. This marked the first time a Western artist in modern times was permitted perform at the location. The project began after Yanni received an invitation from the China National Culture and Arts Corp. Before the Forbidden City was chosen, locations by the Great Wall of China and the Temple of Heaven were possible candidates to stage the shows. The show's promoters asked for 5,000 seats, but they had to settle for around 4,000, hundreds of which were reserved for Chinese officials. A request to beam lights from inside the temple outward was denied. The crew were instructed to have the sound no louder than 40 decibels. Before the show, Yanni performed sold-out shows at arenas in Shanghai and Guangzhou. Later in 1997, Yanni deemed the audiences as the best of his career.

Yanni hired Armenian conductor Armen Anassian for the tour "on faith"; he had not seen Anassian perform before. The conductor recalled being sceptical about the tour, "But the truth is, it happened. We did it" and said it was a "life-changing experience."

== Album ==
=== Critical reception ===
Professional ratings
Review scores
Source	Rating
AllMusic	3/5 stars
AllMovie	2/5 stars

In a review by Jonathan Widran of AllMusic, "Yanni's gargantuan popularity unfortunately makes him an easy target for those who see his orchestrally inspired works as glorified musical wallpaper. But if they'd listen for the whole picture before judging, it would be clear that he brings classically influenced symphonic qualities to modern instrumental music; it's highly charged film scoring, only without the movie. The musical images comprising Tribute and the photos in the packaging come from the famous places that not only inspired it but at which it was performed: India's Taj Mahal and China's Forbidden City. While conventional string and brass instruments lead the way, Pedro Eustache's bamboo sax and Doodook and the gypsy-flavored lead violin of Karen Briggs supply appropriate dashes of Eastern culture. "Waltz in 7/8" combines the traditional western rhythm scheme with Eustache's exotic flute improvisation. As always, Yanni plays keyboards, but he's more a ringmaster/conductor of an inspiring, symphonic brew that includes gospel and flamenco (with rousing vocals and an accompanying guitar textured over a mid size string section), powerful violin/funky sax duets (the core of the seven-minute "Renegade"), improvisational trumpet ("Dance with a Stranger"), and an intoxicating weave of an orchestra with upward climbing operatic voices. Yanni and friends tap on another culture on the closing track, the previously recorded African tribal piece "Niki Nana", which features Eustache's percussive flute and a hooky wordless vocal chant from a gospel-flavored, female choir. As we see from the other artists this month, there are many ways to build musical bridges between East and West; Yanni's approach is spiritual grandeur in a beautiful, theatrical setting."

=== Track listing ===
No.	Title	Length
1.	"Deliverance"	8:33
2.	"Adagio in C Minor"	3:50
3.	"Renegade"	7:14
4.	"Dance with a Stranger"	6:45
5.	"Tribute"	6:40
6.	"Prelude"	2:27
7.	"Love Is All" (writers Pamela Lynn McNeill, Dugan McNeill; and performed by Vann Johnson)	5:25
8.	"Southern Exposure"	6:48
9.	"Waltz in 7/8"	5:32
10.	"Nightingale"	5:44
11.	"Niki Nana (We're One)" (Tommy Sterling, Yanni)	8:15

=== RIAA certification ===
Recording Industry Association of America (RIAA) Gold and Platinum database entries:

- (G=Gold, P=Platinum, M=Multi-Platinum)
- YANNI TRIBUTE 03/11/98 VIRGIN P ALBUM SOLO Std
- YANNI TRIBUTE 03/11/98 VIRGIN G ALBUM SOLO Std

== Video ==
=== Track listing ===
1. "Deliverance"
2. "Adagio in C Minor"
3. "Renegade"
4. "Waltz in 7/8"
5. "Tribute"
6. "Dance with a Stranger"
7. "Nightingale"
8. "Southern Exposure"
9. "Prelude"
10. "Love Is All"
11. "Niki Nana (We're One)"
12. "Santorini"

== Sound ==
"Tribute"
Title track from the album Tribute

== Personnel ==
Music

- Yanni – keyboards
- Karen Briggs – violin, chorus on "Niki Nana (We're One)"
- Daniel de los Reyes – percussion, chorus on "Niki Nana (We're One)"
- Pedro Eustache – flute, soprano saxophone, bamboo saxophone, duduk, quena, Chinese flute, ney, bass flute, chorus on "Niki Nana (We're One)"
- Ric Fierabracci – bass guitar
- Ming Freeman – keyboards
- David Hudson – didgeridoo
- Ramon Stagnaro – guitar, charango, chorus on "Niki Nana (We're One)"
- Joel Taylor – drums
- Alfreda Gerald – vocals, lead vocals on "Niki Nana (We're One)"
- Vann Johnson – vocals, lead vocals on "Love Is All"
- Jeanette Clinger – vocals
- Catte Adams – vocals
- Armen Anassian – conductor, violin on "Tribute"
- Clif Foster – first violin, concertmaster
- Beth Folsom – violin
- Julian Hallmark – violin
- Sayuri Kawada – violin
- Neal Laite – violin
- Ann Lasley – violin, chorus on "Niki Nana (We're One)"
- Will Logan – violin
- Julie Metz – violin
- Pam Moore – violin
- Cheryl Ongaro – violin, chorus on "Niki Nana (We're One)"
- Delia Park – violin, chorus on "Niki Nana (We're One)"
- Irina Voloshina – violin
- Corinne Chapelle – violin
- German Markosian – viola
- Eugene Mechtovich – viola
- Cathy Paynter – viola, chorus on "Niki Nana (We're One)"
- John Krovoza – cello
- Sarah O'Brien – cello
- Lisa Pribanic – cello
- Alexander Zhiroff – cello
- Gary Lasley – contra bass, chorus on "Niki Nana (We're One)"
- April Aoki – harp
- Cheryl Foster – oboe
- Matt Reynolds – French horn, chorus on "Niki Nana (We're One)"
- James Mattos – French horn
- Paul Klintworth – French horn
- Doug Lyons – French horn
- Luis Aquino – trumpet
- Kerry Hughes – trumpet
- Rich Berkeley – trombone
- Dana Hughes – trombone, bass trombone

Production

- Yanni – production, arranger, engineer, orchestrations
- Anthony Stabile – assistant engineer
- Tommy Sterling – assistant engineer
- Paul Sarault - monitor engineer
- Curtis Kelly - monitor engineer / technician
- Jeffrey Mark Silverman – orchestrations

== The Tribute World Tour 1998 ==
=== Dates ===
1997–1998

=== Cities ===
For cities, see below

=== Set list ===
- "Deliverance"
- "Adagio in C Minor"
- "Renegade"
- "Waltz in 7/8"
- "Tribute"
- "Dance with a Stranger"
- "Within Attraction"
- "Aria"
- "Keys to Imagination"
- "Nightingale"
- "Southern Exposure"
- "Marching Season"
- "Nostalgia"
- "Prelude/Love Is All"
- "Acroyali/Standing in Motion"
- "Reflections of Passion"
- "Niki Nana (We're One)"
- "Santorini"

=== Tour production ===
- Business Manager: Tom Paske
- Video Director/Producer: George Veras
- Tour Accountants: Diane Kramer, Pete Dorsey
- Yanni Management Tour Support Staff: Anda Allenson, Richard Allenson

=== Tour dates ===
Date	City	Country	Venue
January 17, 1998	New York City	United States	Radio City Music Hall
January 24, 1998	Sacramento	United States	ARCO Arena
January 26, 1998	Worcester	United States	Worcester's Centrum Centre
January 27, 1998	Philadelphia	United States	CoreStates Center
January 29, 1998	Fort Lauderdale	United States	Dean E. Smith Student Activities Center
January 31, 1998	Washington, D.C.	United States	MCI Center
February 3, 1998	Fairborn	United States	Ervin J. Nutter Center
February 4, 1998	Auburn Hills	United States	The Palace of Auburn Hills
February 6, 1998	Cleveland	United States	CSU Convocation Center
February 7, 1998	Buffalo	United States	Marine Midland Arena
February 8, 1998	Pittsburgh	United States	Civic Arena
February 10, 1998	St. Louis	United States	Kiel Center
February 12, 1998	Indianapolis	United States	Market Square Arena
February 13, 1998	Minneapolis	United States	Target Center
February 14, 1998	Moline	United States	The MARK of the Quad Cities
February 17, 1998	Knoxville	United States	Thompson–Boling Arena
February 18, 1998	Louisville	United States	Freedom Hall
February 19, 1998	Nashville	United States	Nashville Arena
February 21, 1998	Grand Rapids	United States	Van Andel Arena
February 22, 1998	Chicago	United States	United Center
February 25, 1998	Anaheim	United States	Arrowhead Pond of Anaheim
February 27, 1998	Inglewood	United States	Great Western Forum
February 28, 1998	Oakland	United States	The Arena in Oakland
March 19, 1998	Tulsa	United States	Tulsa Convention Center
March 20, 1998	Phoenix	United States	America West Arena
March 22, 1998	Reno	United States	Lawlor Events Center
March 24, 1998	Sacramento	United States	ARCO Arena
March 25, 1998	San Jose	United States	San Jose Arena
March 27, 1998	Salt Lake City	United States	Delta Center
March 28, 1998	Las Vegas Strip	United States	MGM Grand Garden Arena
March 29, 1998	San Diego	United States	San Diego Sports Arena
April 3, 1998	Portland	United States	Rose Garden Arena
April 4, 1998	Spokane	United States	Spokane Arena
April 5, 1998	Seattle	United States	KeyArena
April 6, 1998	Vancouver	Canada	General Motors Place
April 9, 1998	Edmonton	Canada	Edmonton Coliseum
April 10, 1998	Calgary	Canada	Canadian Airlines Saddledome
April 12, 1998	Denver	United States	McNichols Sports Arena
April 18, 1998	Lincoln	United States	Bob Devaney Sports Center
April 19, 1998	Valley Center	United States	Kansas Coliseum
April 21, 1998	Milwaukee	United States	Bradley Center
April 22, 1998	Madison	United States	Dane County Coliseum
April 23, 1998	Duluth	United States	Duluth Entertainment Convention Center
April 25, 1998	Winnipeg	Canada	Winnipeg Arena
April 26, 1998	Fargo	United States	Fargodome
May 18, 1998	Austin	United States	Frank Erwin Center
May 26, 1998	University Park	United States	Bryce Jordan Center
June 2, 1998	Rochester, NY	United States	
June 7, 1998	Boston	United States	Fleet Center
June 8, 1998	Hartford	United States	Hartford Civic Center
June 12, 1998	Atlanta	United States	Coca-Cola Lakewood Amphitheatre
June 13, 1998	Atlanta	United States	Coca-Cola Lakewood Amphitheatre
June 14, 1998	Cincinnati	United States	The Crown
June 20, 1998	Chicago	United States	United Center
June 23, 1998	Syracuse	United States	Onondaga County War Memorial
June 26, 1998	Uniondale	United States	Nassau Veterans Memorial Coliseum
June 30, 1998	Montreal	Canada	Molson Centre
July 3, 1998	Quebec City	Canada	Colisée de Québec
July 5, 1998	Hamilton	Canada	Copps Coliseum

== Charts ==
Chart performance for Tribute
Chart (1998)	Peak position
Australian Albums (ARIA)	48
Belgian Albums (Ultratop Flanders)	16
Belgian Albums (Ultratop Wallonia)	11
Dutch Albums (Album Top 100)	27
French Albums (SNEP)	21
New Zealand Albums (RMNZ)	40
Norwegian Albums (VG-lista)	16
Swedish Albums (Sverigetopplistan)	35
Swiss Albums (Schweizer Hitparade)	23
UK Albums (Official Charts)	40
US Billboard 200	21
US New Age Albums (Billboard)	1

== Certifications ==
Certifications for Tribute
Region	Certification	Certified units/sales
Canada (Music Canada)	Gold	50,000^{^}
Spain (Promusicae)	Platinum	100,000^{^}
United States (RIAA)	Platinum	1,000,000^{^}
United States (RIAA) Video	2× Platinum	200,000^{^}
^{^} Shipments figures based on certification alone.
