= Michelle Amato =

American vocalist

- Born: U.S.
- Genres: Jazz
- Occupations: Singer, educator

Michelle Amato is an American vocalist.

She trained at the University of Miami's School of Music. She has toured or recorded with Quincy Jones, Jon Secada, Liza Minnelli, Al Green, Sandi Patty, Jon Hendricks, Donna Summer, Michael McDonald, Celia Cruz, and Rita Marley. She has been a featured soloist with the Memphis Symphony and the South Florida Pops.

She performed with Yanni during the 2003–2004 Ethnicity tour and her featured solo work can be heard on that album. She also toured with him during the 2005 Yanni Live! tour and appears on the resulting live concert film Yanni Live! The Concert Event. Amato is on the jazz faculty at the University of North Florida.

== Discography ==
- I'm All Smiles (2006)
- Celtic Ladies (2007), three discs set.

With The Palm Beach Society Orchestra

- The Palm Beach Society Orchestra: When You're Smiling (Arbors)
