= Ender Thomas =

Venezuelan singer-songwriter (born 1977)

- Thomas at the 2026 Latin Grammy Awards

Background information
- Born: 1977 (age 48–49)
- Origin: Puerto Cabello, Venezuela
- Occupations: Singer, songwriter, composer
- Instrument: Guitar
- Labels: G89music, CDagroup, Yanni Wake
- Website: www.enderthomas.com

Ender Thomas is a Venezuelan singer-songwriter. He was a featured vocalist during the 2009 tour for Yanni Voices produced by Disney Pearl Imprint. His vocal range is tenor.

Ender was born in Puerto Cabello, Venezuela. Prior to his work with Greek musician Yanni, he was the frontman for a salsa band in his home country. For the Voices project, he was the last of the four vocalists selected. Yanni commented "It took us a year and a half to find Ender. We were looking for a Latino, fiery, specific kind of voice. And that took us a long time to find."

== Discography ==
=== Albums ===
- Yanni Voices - featured vocalist
- Yanni Presents Ender Thomas

=== Singles ===
- Ritual de Amor
- Bajo El Cielo De Noviembre
- Susurros En la Oscuridad
- Mi Todo Eres Tú
- Sin Temor De Vivir
- Sirena
- Quedate Conmigo
- Por Llegar A Tí
- India
- Este Amor
- Como Debe Ser
- Más Allá

== Singles ==
- "Me fascinas" with A.B. Quintanilla Released July, 2010
- "El Principe De La Paz" Released December, 2010
- "O Principe Da Paz" Released December, 2010
- "The Prince Of Peace" Released December, 2010
- "Puerto Cabello Te Quiero" Released March, 2011
- "Desejo" Released April, 2011
- "Vino" Released May, 2012
- "Soy Venezuela" Released April, 2013
