= Collections (Yanni album) =

Compilation album by Yanni
- Released: May 20, 2008
- Genre: Instrumental
- Length: 44:07
- Label: Sony BMG Music Entertainment
- Producer: Yanni

Yanni chronology
Super Hits (2007)	Collections (2008)	Yanni Voices (2009)

Professional ratings
Review scores
Source	Rating
AllMusic	(?)

Collections is a compilation album by keyboardist and composer Yanni, released on the Sony BMG Music Entertainment label in 2008.

== Track listing ==
No.	Title	Length
1.	"Reflections of Passion"	4:33
2.	"Until the Last Moment"	6:23
3.	"Before I Go"	4:30
4.	"After the Sunrise"	4:39
5.	"To the One Who Knows"	5:37
6.	"Once Upon a Time"	3:52
7.	"A Word in Private"	3:45
8.	"Flight of Fantasy"	5:41
9.	"Almost a Whisper"	3:09
10.	"Aria"	3:58
