= Alfreda Gerald =

American singer

- Origin: Morganton, North Carolina, United States
- Genres: R&B, gospel, opera, house music
- Labels: Waffle Records, Budweiser Showdown, V-103 WXYV-FM, Safari Music, Groove Culture Music
- Website: alfredagerald.com

Alfreda Gerald is an American vocalist born in Morganton, North Carolina.

Upon graduating from college, Gerald sang professional opera with the London Philharmonic Orchestra, the New York Philharmonic Orchestra, and the North Carolina Symphony Orchestra. She has both a classical and R&B background and has toured and/or recorded with such artists as Elton John, Warren Haynes, Oteil Burbridge, The Gap Band, Michelle Malone, Third Day, Celine Dion, The Black Crowes, Gladys Knight, Shawn Mullins and Taliesin Orchestra.

She's heard as the woman singing nonsensical lyrics to the theme song of the 1994 cult classic Cartoon Network/Adult Swim series, Space Ghost Coast to Coast (credited as "Alfrieda Gerald"). Her vocal performance was improvised to playback of the theme as performed by Sonny Sharrock.

She has been a featured vocalist with Yanni on several of his singles, and has appeared on three of his tours, Ethnicity and 2005 Yanni Live! world tours, and appears in the live concert films Tribute, and Yanni Live! The Concert Event.

Gerald appeared in Madea's Witness Protection (2012) performing "Oh Happy Day". She also appeared in The Hate U Give and TV shows Hap and Leonard and The Detour.

== Discography ==
- Soulstice (2004)
- The Standards Collection (2006)
