= I Love You Perfect =

Soundtrack album by Yanni
- Released: 1995
- Genre: Contemporary instrumental Easy listening Soft adult contemporary
- Length: 31:21
- Label: Silva America
- Producer: Yanni

Yanni chronology
A Collection of Romantic Themes (1994)	I Love You Perfect (1995)	Live at Royal Albert Hall (1995)

Professional ratings
Review scores
Source	Rating
AllMusic	2.5/5 stars

I Love You Perfect is the soundtrack album for the TV movie of the same name, composed and performed by Yanni. The album peaked at #13 on Billboard's "Top New Age Albums" chart in 1996.

== Track listing ==
No.	Title	Length
1.	"Opening Credits/Theme"	4:19
2.	"The Lover's Quarrel"	0:55
3.	"Allan Fired"	0:55
4.	"Chair Shower & Court Room Montage"	1:35
5.	"Setting the Horse Free"	3:21
6.	"The Lovers Make Up"	0:54
7.	"Clarinet Quintet K. 581 - Allegretto"	8:22
8.	"Marry Me!"	2:10
9.	"I'll Be by Your Side"	2:12
10.	"Temper Tantrum"	2:02
11.	"But I Have Some Good Days"	0:45
12.	"Hospital Montage"	1:50
13.	"Christina Dies"	1:16
14.	"I Love You Perfect (End Theme)"	0:40
