= Víctor Espínola =

Paraguayan musical artist

- Origin: Paraguay
- Occupation: Musician
- Instrument: Harp
- Website: www.victorespinola.com

Víctor Espínola is a Paraguayan multi-instrumentalist and singer, best known for playing the Paraguayan harp. His style of music is influenced by a combination of flamenco, gypsy, Brazilian, Middle Eastern, African, pop and dance. He has toured throughout the world including Brazil, Argentina, Chile, Switzerland, Italy, Austria and Germany. Espínola is a featured concert instrumentalist with the Greek musician Yanni, touring during the 2003 and 2004 Ethnicity world tours, the 2005 Yanni Live! The Concert Event tour and the 2009 Yanni Voices tour. His brother Fito Espinola is also a talented guitarist and singer.

== Discography ==
- Walking on the Wind (2000) (Paye)
- I Belong to You
- Forbidden Angel
