= The Very Best of Yanni =

Compilation album by Yanni
- Released: October 10, 2000
- Genre: Contemporary instrumental
- Length: 74:36
- Label: Private Music
- Producer: Yanni

Yanni chronology
| If I Could Tell You (2000) | The Very Best of Yanni (2000) | Ultimate Yanni (2003) |

Professional ratings
Review scores
| Source | Rating |
|---|---|
| AllMusic | 4.5/5 stars |

The Very Best of Yanni is a compilation album by Greek keyboardist and composer Yanni, released on the Private Music label in 2000 (see 2000 in music). The album peaked at #3 on Billboard's "Top New Age Albums" chart in the same year.

== Background ==
This compilations includes Yanni's most treasured songs together on CD for the first time. Over 70 minutes of his classics including "Santorini", "The Rain Must Fall", "Marching Season" and "Aria".

== Track listing ==
| No. | Title | Length |
|---|---|---|
| 1. | "Aria" | 3:58 |
| 2. | "Looking Glass" | 6:35 |
| 3. | "In the Morning Light" | 3:49 |
| 4. | "Marching Season" | 5:34 |
| 5. | "Swept Away" | 4:41 |
| 6. | "One Man's Dream" | 2:43 |
| 7. | "The Mermaid" | 3:46 |
| 8. | "To the One Who Knows" | 5:39 |
| 9. | "Santorini" | 4:34 |
| 10. | "Acroyali" | 5:05 |
| 11. | "In the Mirror" | 4:07 |
| 12. | "Someday" | 4:34 |
| 13. | "Flight of Fantasy" | 5:41 |
| 14. | "The End of August" | 4:51 |
| 15. | "The Rain Must Fall" | 4:36 |
| 16. | "Face in the Photograph" | 3:47 |

== Production ==
- All songs written by Yanni except track 1 written by Yanni and Malcolm McLaren
- Compilation produced by Paul Williams for House of Hits Production, Ltd.
- Digitally Remastered by Bill Lacey at Digital Sound & Picture, NY
- Compiled by Sheila Volpe
- Sequence by Buzz Ravineau
- Photography: Lynn Goldsmith
- Art Direction and Design: JRJ Associates Inc.
- Special thanks to Mario Augusta and Debbie Eisen
- Produced by Yanni except tracks 4, 5, 7, 10, 12, 13 and 15 produced by Peter Baumann and Yanni

(Personnel as described in CD liner notes.)
