= Armen Anassian =

- Origin: Armenia
- Occupations: Conductor; Musician
- Instrument: Violin
- Years active: 1983–present

Armen Anassian holds master's degrees in Instrumental Conducting and Violin Performance, and studied in the United States, Armenia, and Germany. His teachers include Rainer Kussmaul, Sidney Weiss, Dorothy DeLay, and conductor Michael Zearott. Mr. Anassian has held Conducting and/or Concertmaster positions with such noted groups as the Hoboken Chamber Orchestra, Freiburg Chamber Orchestra, Heidelberg Chamber Orchestra and the Zelt Musik Festival Orchestra. In Los Angeles he has been Concertmaster/Guest Concertmaster with Pacific Symphony, Santa Barbara Symphony, California Philharmonic, Pasadena Pops, Burbank Symphony, Riverside Philharmonic, Inland Empire Symphony, Long Beach Symphony, Glendale Symphony, Symphony in the Glen and the Los Angeles Opera.

Mr. Anassian has performed hundreds of concerts in France, England, Belgium, Spain, Italy, Switzerland, China, India, Malaysia, Singapore, South Korea, Japan, Australia, Canada, Mexico, and all over the United States. He was invited to perform the Khachaturian Violin Concerto in Armenia with the Armenian National Philharmonic. Locally, Mr. Anassian has been featured as soloist with the California Philharmonic, Glendale Symphony, Pasadena Pops, Riverside Philharmonic, Burbank Symphony, Munich Andechs Philharmonic, Timișoara Philharmonic in Romania, Armenian Philharmonic in Concertos by Brahms, Tchaikovski, Khachaturian, Prokofieff (1&2), Shostakovich (1&2), Bartok 2, Stravinsky, etc. In the summer of 2009, as well as 2015, Mr. Anassian was a featured soloist at Disney Hall performing the Korngold Concerto.

He is scheduled to perform Berg Concerto in Bucharest, Timișoara and Sibiu in April 2018.

Currently, Anassian is an avid researcher/ performer of 20th-century concertos and a recitalist, performing with his longtime collaborator Mark Robson. He is also a violinist with the Los Angeles Opera, where he has also served as guest concertmaster under the direction of James Conlon. He has collaborated with Plácido Domingo, Esa Pekka Salonen, Luciano Pavarotti, Valery Gergiev, Gustavo Dudamel, etc. He also records in the recording and film industries with composers such as John Williams, James Horner, Hans Zimmer, James Newton Howard, Alan Silvestry, Randy Newman, Danny Elfman, John Debny, Lalo Shiffrin, Howard Shore, Alexander Desplat, Michael Giacchino among many others.

== History ==
Anassian was born and raised in Armenia, where he began his musical studies, and moved to the United States with his family at the age of 15. He graduated from Armenian Mesrobian High School in Pico Rivera, California, in 1981. He holds master's degrees in instrumental conducting and violin performance, and studied in the United States, Armenia, and Germany. His teachers include Rainer Kussmaul, Sidney Weiss, Dorothy DeLay, and conductor Michael Zearott. Anassian has held conducting and/or concertmaster positions with such noted groups as the Hoboken Chamber Orchestra, Freiburg Chamber Orchestra, Heidelberg Chamber Orchestra, and the International Zelt Musik Orchestra. He has performed hundreds of concerts in France, England, Belgium, Spain, Italy, Switzerland, China, India, Malaysia, Singapore, South Korea, Japan, Australia, Canada, Mexico, and all over the United States. He was invited to perform the Khachaturian Violin Concerto in Armenia with the Armenian National Philharmonic under the baton of his father, Henrik Anassian. In addition to playing violin with the Los Angeles Opera, Anassian is concertmaster with the Symphony in the Glen. In the United States, Anassian has been a featured soloist with the California Philharmonic Orchestra, Pasadena Pops Orchestra, Riverside Philharmonic Orchestra, Burbank Symphony Orchestra, Antelope Valley Symphony Orchestra, and the Pacific Palisades Symphony Orchestra.

=== Yanni ===
Anassian was hired by Yanni as a Concertmaster for the 1994 tour, as well as serving as a violin soloist. He appears on the live concert videos, Yanni Live at Royal Albert Hall and Tribute. According to Armen, Yanni hired him as a conductor "on faith" - as he had never watched him conduct an orchestra. "That's how Yanni does many things," Anassian said in a 1998 interview with the Toledo Blade. Anassian concedes that he had some doubts about the artist's plans to perform at India's Taj Mahal and China's Forbidden City, for Tribute. "To be honest, a few years ago when he was talking about it, the idea was so amazing. I myself was very skeptical, understandably so. But the truth is, it happened. We did it." He goes on to say, "I did one tour as concertmaster and I got to know [Yanni] very, very well." "[Yanni] heavily relies on his instincts, and I am happy to say, they're usually good. Especially when it comes to people, when it comes to audiences, when it comes to music, and what's expected of him." Anassian said the Tribute video looks great but watching it on film cannot compare to actually being at the Taj Mahal and Forbidden City concerts. "It doesn't feel the same. It doesn't smell the same," he said with a laugh. "It's hard to put it in a nutshell. It was a life-changing experience." The contrast he encountered in India was profound. "Unless you go to India...you cannot fathom that poverty and deprivation on the one hand and such overwhelming beauty as the Taj Mahal on the other hand. There was always that conflict that dominated my days in India." He said that he hears from many fans about how Yanni's music has had a positive impact on their lives, but from the conductor's podium he's working too hard to notice. "We're so involved in the music, we take it for granted. We do it every day."

=== Recording credits and soundtracks ===
Recording credits also include artists such as Fergie, Ricardo Arjona, Dave Hollister, Hans Zimmer, James Horner, and Will Downing. Anassian frequently works with the recording and film industries, playing regularly with composers such as John Williams, James Horner, Hans Zimmer, James Newton Howard, Alan Silvestri, and Danny Elfman. Soundtrack credits include Rush Hour 2, Matchstick Men, Twisted, King Kong, The Legend of Zorro, The Nativity Story, Robots, The Skeleton Key, Spanglish, Steamboy, The Lost City, Blades of Glory, Teenage Mutant Ninja Turtles, Transformers, and Gracie.
