= Nathan Pacheco =

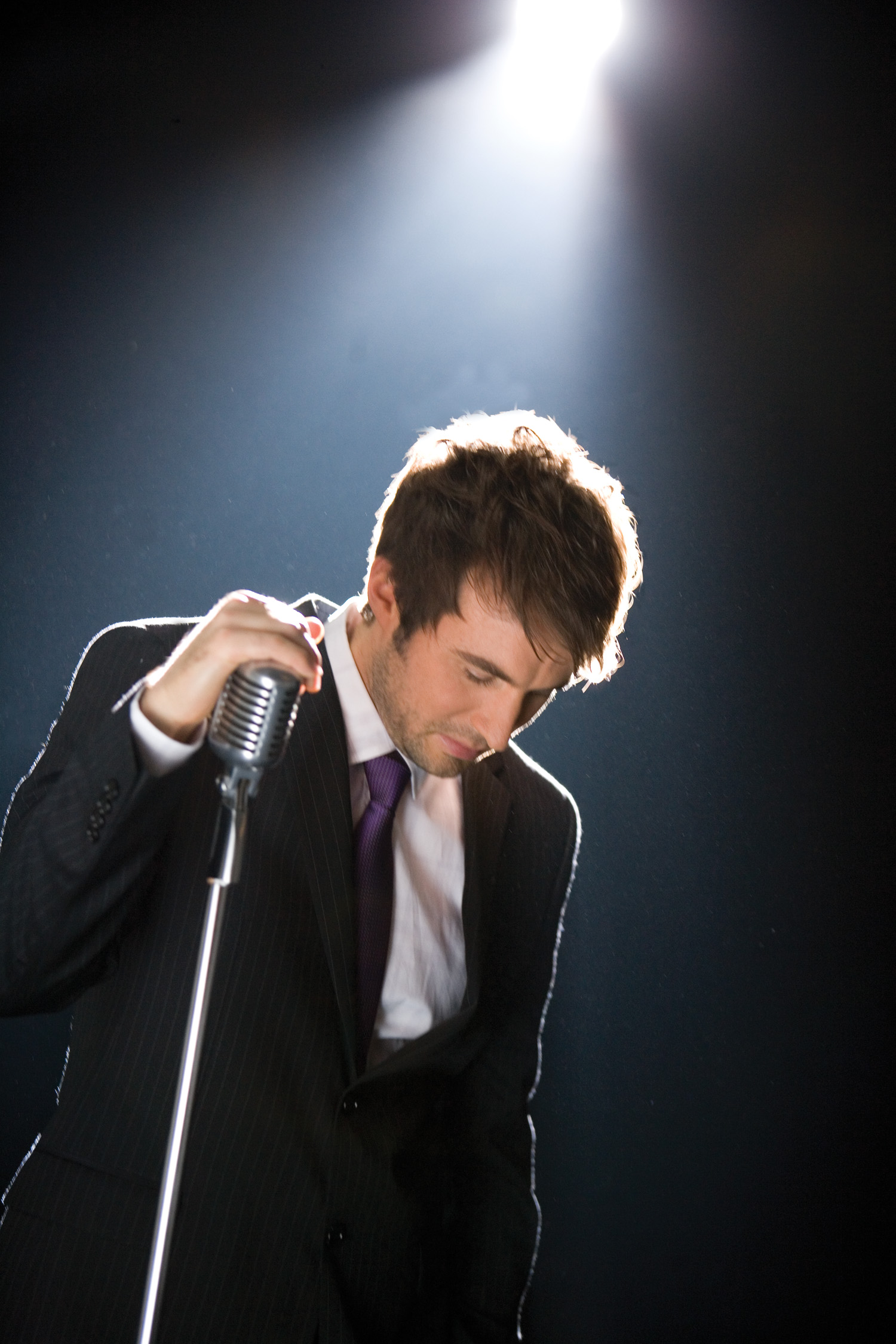
- Pacheco in October 2010

Background information
- Born: Nathan Armand Pacheco; January 23, 1980 (age 46); Virginia, U.S.
- Genres: Classical; crossover
- Occupations: Singer; songwriter
- Instruments: Piano; guitar; vocals
- Years active: 2006–present
- Labels: Disney Pearl Series, Shadow Mountain
- Website: www.nathanpacheco.com

Nathan Armand Pacheco is an American tenor singer and songwriter of Brazilian origin. He was a featured vocalist during the 2009 tour for Yanni Voices, produced by Walt Disney Records, and is currently signed to the Disney Pearl Series sub-label.

== Biography ==
After spending his youth in Northern Virginia and graduating from Oakton High School in Vienna, Virginia, Pacheco graduated from the music program at Brigham Young University (BYU). He continues his education abroad in South America and Europe. Pacheco spent two years in Brazil as a missionary for the Church of Jesus Christ of Latter-day Saints (LDS Church). He has traveled throughout Brazil, performing both classical and cultural music.

He also spent time in Italy, studying Italian while performing with the Opera Festival of Lucca. He speaks and composes in English, Portuguese, Italian, and Spanish.

== Career ==
After auditioning for producer Ric Wake, who then introduced him to Yanni, Pacheco began adding lyrics and additional music to some of Yanni's most famous works, such as "Adagio", "Tribute", "Almost a Whisper", "Enchantment", "Secret Vows" and "In the Mirror". Upon completion of the recordings with Yanni, Pacheco was a featured performer in two PBS television specials, which were broadcast from 2008 to 2010. Pacheco then joined Yanni and his orchestra as a featured performer on a 100-concert tour throughout Latin America, Canada, and the United States. He has twice been a performer on the national broadcast of the Disney Parks Christmas Day Parade on ABC: in 2010 (with Yanni) and 2011 (with Katherine Jenkins).

In 2009, Pacheco relocated to Southern California after being signed to the Disney Pearl Series label, where he wrote the songs that made up his debut solo album. Pacheco has collaborated with many writers under the direction of producer/composer Leo Z (Andrea Bocelli, Josh Groban). For his album, Pacheco recorded with the Philharmonia Orchestra in London at Air Studios.

In 2011, Pacheco did the operatic bridge for the song "Let's Talk About Me" from The Muppets and performed in Chicago's Magnificent Mile Lights Festival Parade and the Philadelphia Thanksgiving Parade. He also performed at the British Embassy in Washington, D.C., for H.R.H. Prince Charles honoring British and American soldiers in May 2011.

In 2012, Pacheco joined Welsh mezzo-soprano Katherine Jenkins and the National Symphony Orchestra as a special guest on her 28-date UK tour in January and February. In March, he performed in front of the Washington Monument as part of the Centennial Celebration of the National Cherry Blossom Festival in Washington, D.C. The PBS special Introducing Nathan Pacheco began airing on PBS stations throughout the United States on August 11, 2012. Pacheco released his self-titled debut album on September 18, 2012, and embarked on his first headlining tour in November 2012 with concerts in Chicago, Hartford, Fort Lauderdale, San Diego, Salt Lake City, and Washington, D.C. On July 24, 2013, Pacheco did a performance with the Tabernacle Choir at Temple Square.

On February 10, 2017, Pacheco released an album of religious music entitled Higher.

== Religion and family ==
Pacheco is a member of the LDS Church. He served as an LDS Church missionary in the Campinas Brazil Mission from 1999 to 2001 before attending BYU. On September 9, 2024, Pacheco sang happy birthday at church president Russell M. Nelson's 100th birthday celebration, accompanied by Jenny Oaks Baker and Jared Pierce.

Pacheco and his wife, Katie, are the parents of three children.

== Albums discography ==
List of studio albums, with year released and chart positions
Title	Year	Peak chart positions					
Title	Year	US (Note: All of these United States chart positions are from Billboard's Top Current Albums chart, which only ranks the best-selling recently-released albums. None of Pacheco's releases have appeared on the magazine's normal album chart, which includes catalog releases in addition to current albums.)	US Christian	US Classical	US Holiday	US Heat	US Indie
My Prayer	2019	–	–	3	–	18	45
O Holy Night	2017	–	30	5	43	2	30
Higher	2017	88	16	1	–	3	16
Nathan Pacheco II	2015	–	–	–	–	–	–
Nathan East	2014	163	–	–	–	–	–
Nathan Pacheco	2012	180	–	3	–	7	–
Introducing... Nathan Pacheco	2012	–	–	18	–	–	–

== Singles discography ==
- "O Holy Night" with Chloe (2009)
- "O Holy Night" with Katherine Jenkins (2011)
- "Questa O Quella" (2014)
- "The Prayer" with David Archuleta (2015)
- "Perfect" with David Archuleta (2018)

== Sources ==
- "Nathan Pacheco, rising star in world of classical crossover", Washington Post Nov. 8, 2012
