= Yanni Voices =

Studio album and concert film by Yanni
- Released: March 24, 2009
- Genre: Opera, opera-pop, classical crossover
- Length: 60:28
- Label: Yanni Wake/Disney Pearl Series
- Producer: Yanni; Ric Wake

Yanni chronology
Collections (2008)	Yanni Voices (2009)	The Essential Yanni (2010)

Alternative Cover
- Spanish version

Professional ratings
Review scores
Source	Rating
AllMusic	3/5 stars

Yanni Voices (also released in Spanish as Yanni Voces) is the twelfth studio album and fifth live DVD by Yanni, released on Yanni/Wake label in 2009.

== Background ==
This was Yanni's first studio release in six years. In collaboration with producer Ric Wake, Yanni showcased vocal artists singing to his classic songs, blending fresh interpretations of vintage Yanni tracks with newly written material. It also introduces the four new vocalists at the center of the project: Leslie Mills, Chloe Lowery, Nathan Pacheco, and Ender Thomas.

Disney Pearl Imprint released Yanni Voices and its Buena Vista Concerts division produced an extensive tour that began in April 2009. The tour kicked off with a special concert filmed Live at the Forum (Mundo Imperial) in Acapulco Mexico. This concert is the subject of a television special that aired in March 2009 on PBS.

Yanni Voces features a collection of Spanish duets with Latin recording artists and the new vocalists of Yanni Voices. Special guest performers included Lucero, Cristian Castro and José José.

== Charts and sales ==
The album peaked at No. 20 on Billboard's Top 200 chart and reached No. 1 on its New Age albums chart. The Spanish version, Yanni Voces, debuted at #2 on Billboard's New Age chart, #5 on the Latin Pop chart, and #13 on the Latin overall chart.

Yanni Voices received a debut sales week figure of 26,000 units on the Billboard chart dated April 11, 2009, a figure that was not surpassed in the Billboard new age category through at least October 2014.

== Track listing ==
=== English version ===
No.	Title	Length
1.	"Omaggio (Tribute)"	4:36
2.	"The Keeper"	3:28
3.	"Our Days"	4:28
4.	"Never Leave the Sun"	3:56
5.	"Before the Night Ends (To Take... To Hold)"	3:55
6.	"1001"	3:52
7.	"Mas Allá"	3:30
8.	"Unico Amore (Enchantment)"	4:06
9.	"Vivi Il Tuo Sogno (Almost a Whisper)"	3:38
10.	"Orchid"	4:14
11.	"Set Me Free"	3:23
12.	"Kill Me with Your Love"	3:33
13.	"Mi Todo Eres Tú (Until the Last Moment)"	3:24
14.	"Ritual De Amor (Desire)"	4:13
15.	"Moments Without Time"	3:51
16.	"Nei Tuoi Occhi (In the Mirror)"	3:58
17.	"Amare di Nuovo (Adagio in C Minor)"	6:23

Target exclusive edition
No.	Title	Length
13.	"Love Take Me" (Bonus track)	3:32
14.	"Mi Todo Eres Tú (Until the Last Moment)"	3:24
15.	"Ritual De Amor (Desire)"	4:13
16.	"Moments Without Time"	3:51
17.	"I'm So" (Bonus track)	4:55
18.	"Nei Tuoi Occhi (In the Mirror)"	3:58
19.	"Amare Di Nuovo (Adagio in C Minor)"	6:23

=== Spanish version ===
No.	Title	Featured artists	Length
1.	"Ritual De Amor (Desire)"	Ender Thomas	4:10
2.	"Llama De Amor (The Flame Within)"	Olga Tañón	3:56
3.	"Y Te Vas (Based on the prelude to Keys to Imagination)"	Andy Vargas	4:23
4.	"Ni La Fuerza Del Destino (With an Orchid)"	Cristian Castro	4:00
5.	"Unico Amore (Enchantment)"	Nathan Pacheco	4:06
6.	"No Ha Dejado De Llover (The Rain Must Fall)"	José Feliciano	4:23
7.	"Quédate Conmigo"	Ender Thomas, Chloe	3:16
8.	"Nei Tuoi Occhi (In the Mirror)"	Nathan Pacheco, Chloe	3:57
9.	"Eterno Es Este Amor"	Lucero	4:05
10.	"Volver (Someday)"	Willy Chirino, Arturo Sandoval, Ender Thomas	4:08
11.	"Mi Todo Eres Tú (Until the Last Moment)"	Ender Thomas, Chloe	3:24
12.	"Yanni & Arturo"	Arturo Sandoval	5:54
13.	"Viviré Por Ti (If I Could Tell You)"	Olga Tanon, Nathan Pacheco	3:07
14.	"En Silencio (Whispers in the Dark)"	Ender Thomas	3:53
15.	"Que Te Vaya Bien (Farewell)"	Chloe	3:22
16.	"Amare Di Nuovo (Adagio in C minor)"	Nathan Pacheco	3:50
17.	"Volver A Creer (Reflections of Passion)"	José José	3:04

== Personnel ==
Vocals

- Leslie Mills
- Chloe Lowery
- Nathan Pacheco
- Ender Thomas

== 2009 North America concert tour ==
=== Set list ===
1. "Open/Santorini" (Orchestra)
2. "Unico Amore (Enchantment)" (Nathan)
3. "Nei Tuoi Occhi (In the Mirror)" (Chloe & Nathan)
4. "Ritual De Amore (Desire)" (Ender)
5. "Before the Night Ends" (Leslie)
6. "Within Attraction" (Orchestra)
7. "Change" (Chloe)
8. "Bajo El Cielo De Noviembre (November Sky)" (Ender)
9. "Mi Todo Eres Tu (Until the Last Moment)" (Chloe & Ender)
10. "Vivi Il Tuo Sogno (Almost a Whisper)" (Nathan)
11. "Duet" (Sam & Jason)
12. "Theory of Everything" (Leslie)
13. "Omaggio (Tribute)" (Nathan & Chloe)
14. "Our Days" (Chloe & Leslie)
15. "Susurro's En la Oscuridad" (Ender)
16. "Kill Me with Your Love" (Chloe)
17. "Cello" (Sasha)
18. "Amare Di Nuovo (Adagio in C Minor)" (Nathan)
19. "The Keeper" (Leslie)
20. "Marching Season" (Charlie & Yanni)
21. "Quedate Conmigo" (Chloe & Ender)
22. "Niki Nana" (Chloe & Everyone)

Encore

1. "Standing in Motion" (Orchestra)
2. "Nostalgia" (Orchestra)
3. "The Storm" (Orchestra)

=== Tour dates ===
Date	City	Country	Venue
United States and Canada Leg 1
April 10, 2009	Sunrise	United States	BB&T Center
April 11, 2009	Tampa	United States	Amalie Arena
April 13, 2009	Gainesville	United States	O'Connell Center
April 14, 2009	Orlando	United States	Amway Arena
April 15, 2009	Estero	United States	Germain Arena
April 17, 2009	Jacksonville	United States	Jacksonville Veterans Memorial Arena
April 18, 2009	Duluth	United States	Infinite Energy Center
April 19, 2009	North Charleston	United States	North Charleston Coliseum
April 21, 2009	Greenville	United States	Bi-Lo Center
April 22, 2009	Nashville	United States	Bridgestone Arena
April 24, 2009	Raleigh	United States	PNC Arena
April 25, 2009	Baltimore	United States	1st Mariner Arena
	Reading	United States	
	Wilkes-Barre	United States	
	Norfolk	United States	
	New York City	United States	
	Boston	United States	
	Bridgeport	United States	
	Manchester	United States	
	Quebec City	Canada	
	Montreal	Canada	
	Toronto	Canada	
	Pittsburgh	United States	
	Rochester	United States	
	Albany	United States	
	Atlantic City	United States	
	Mashantucket	United States	
	Minneapolis	United States	
	Chicago	United States	
	St. Louis	United States	
	Omaha	United States	
	Dayton	United States	
	Cleveland	United States	
	Detroit	United States	Palace of Auburn Hills
	Grand Rapids	United States	
	Columbus	United States	
	Kansas City	United States	
	Wichita	United States	
	Austin	United States	
	Houston	United States	

=== Tour musicians ===
- Charlie Adams - drums
- Benedikt Brydern - violin
- Ann Marie Calhoun - violin
- April Cap - oboe
- Jason Carder - trumpet
- Lauren Chipman - viola
- Yoel Del Sol - percussion
- Victor Espinola - Paraguayan harp
- Ming Freeman - keyboard
- Cesar Lemos - guitar
- Ilona Geller - viola
- Kerry Hughes - trumpet
- James Mattos - French horn
- Armen Movsessian - violin
- Sarah O'Brien - cello
- Sylvio Richetto - keyboard
- Anna Stafford - violin
- Dana Teboe - trombone
- Gabriel Vivas - bass
- Erika Walczak - violin
- Samvel Yervinyan - violin
- Alexander Zhiroff - cello

== 2009 "Yanni Live in Concert" (Mexico) ==
=== Tour dates ===
Date	City	Country	Venue
Mexico
October 11, 2009	Puebla	Mexico	Auditorio Siglo XXI
October 13, 2009	Monterrey	Mexico	Arena Monterrey
October 15, 2009	León, Guanajuato	Mexico	Poliforum
October 16, 2009	Guadalajara	Mexico	Auditorio Telmex
October 17, 2009	Guadalajara	Mexico	Auditorio Telmex
October 19, 2009	Mexico City	Mexico	Auditorio Nacional
October 20, 2009	Mexico City	Mexico	Auditorio Nacional
October 21, 2009	Mexico City	Mexico	Auditorio Nacional
