= Magnificent Mile Lights Festival =

Annual event celebrated in Chicago

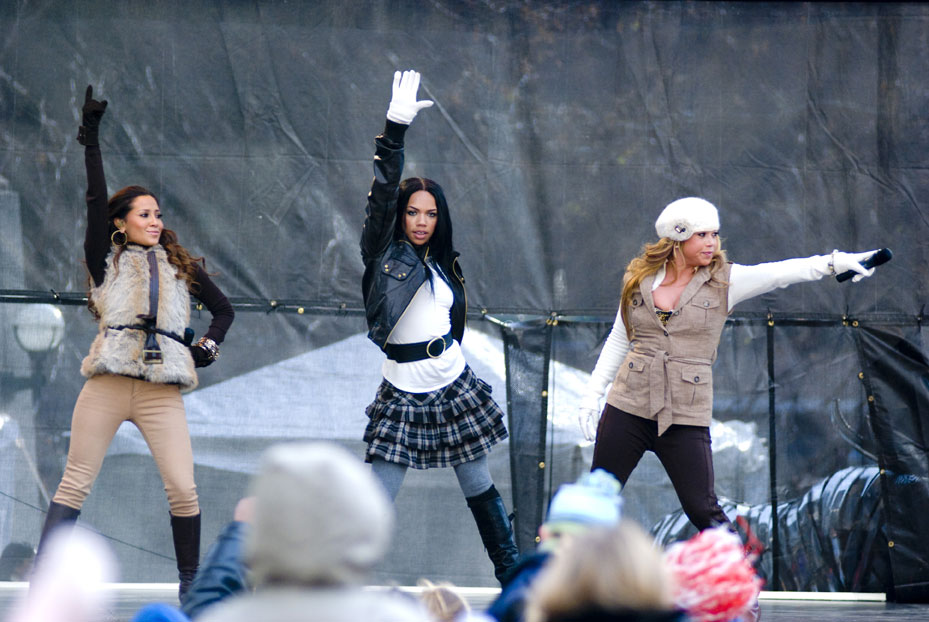
The Cheetah Girls performing at the Harris Stage, Pioneer Court at 401 North Michigan Avenue in 2008

The Magnificent Mile Lights Festival is an annual event celebrated in Chicago on the Saturday before Thanksgiving. An estimated one million lights on 200 trees brighten the city's Michigan Avenue, also known as the Magnificent Mile. The festival is hosted by The Magnificent Mile Association, formerly the Greater North Michigan Avenue Association, and is the third largest parade in the country, according to the chair of the festival.

== History ==
The festival of lights traces its early beginnings in 1949 when members from The Greater North Michigan Avenue Association put up a 50-foot tall Christmas tree in Water Tower Park, which was adorned with 1,500 lights and topped by a six-foot high star. Ten years later, the Saks Fifth Avenue store installed Italian white lights on the branches of the elm trees in front of the store in place of their traditional holiday decorations. Eventually, neighboring stores followed suit with their own lighting decorations, and the trend soon became a popular holiday tradition in the city of Chicago. Well-known shops such as Tiffany, Burberry, Gucci, Armani, and other luxury stores along Michigan Avenue have joined the annual festivities. In 1992, Walt Disney, the company, officially became part of the Lights Festival, turning the event into a major tourist attraction. While other celebrities like Betty Grable have hosted the events, Disney's Mickey Mouse has acted as master of ceremonies in recent years.

2020 saw this festival run behind closed doors due to conditions caused by the COVID-19 pandemic.

== Tree Lighting Parade ==
Aside from the numerous lights and decorations that line up the Magnificent Mile, the Lights Festival also features a colorful parade, from Oak Street on the North to Wacker Drive/the Chicago River on the South, en route to the lighting of the city's Christmas tree. The parade showcases 40 floats with huge helium-filled balloons and is led by well-known Christmas characters such as Rudolph the Red-Nosed Reindeer and Frosty the Snowman. Mickey Mouse and Minnie Mouse from Disney and Kermit the Frog and Miss Piggy of the Muppets have also been regular fixtures. Lively music for the festivities is provided by marching bands from different troupes such as the Crystal Lake Strikers Drum-Line, the Loyola Academy High School Band, the Proviso East High School Band, and the Morton West High School Band.

In 2011, the citizens of Chicago celebrated the 20th anniversary of the Magnificent Mile Lights Festival. Celebrations included performances by multi-Grammy award winner Mary Mary, American Idol finalists Haley Reinhart and Casey Abrams, and teen actress and singer China Anne McClain, as well as various Disney Junior and Radio Disney artists such as Jake and the Never Land Pirate Band, N.B.T. artist Shealeigh from Chicago, and Disney Music Group artist Nathan Pacheco. The anniversary, which was watched by one million spectators, was also highlighted by a visit from Santa and Mrs. Claus and a Christmas display in Chicago's Christkindlmarket.

In 2016, The Magnificent Mile Lights Festival celebrated its 25th anniversary.

A fireworks display caps off the Magnificent Mile Lights Festival, which also signals the start of the holiday shopping season on Michigan Avenue.

== TV broadcast ==
Since 2008, the parade has been broadcast live on local ABC affiliate WLS-TV and a prerecorded broadcast airs in more than 200 TV markets.
