= Samvel Yervinyan =

Armenian violinist and composer (born 1966)

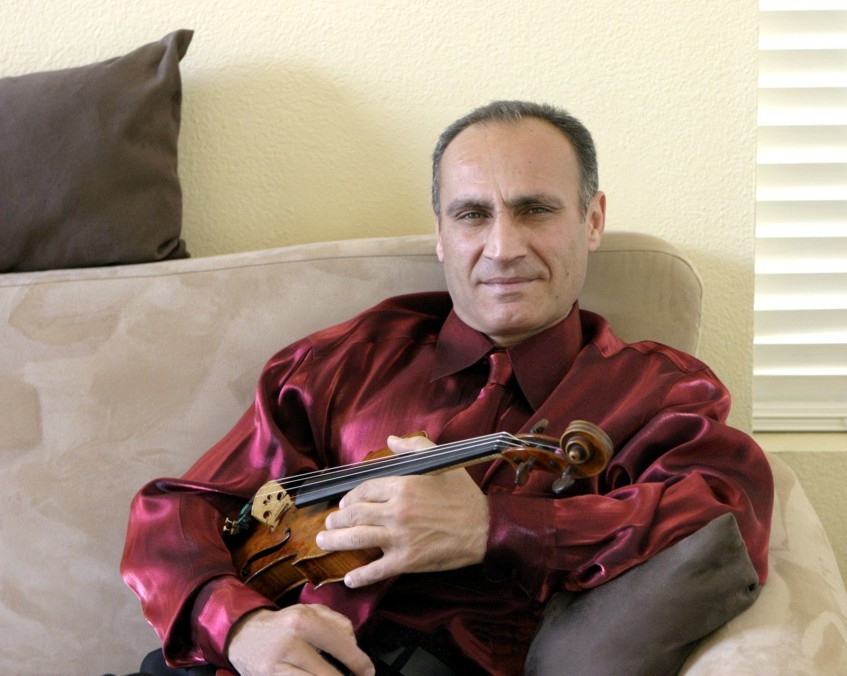

Background information
- Born: January 25, 1966 (age 59); Yerevan, Armenian SSR
- Occupation(s): Composer; Musician
- Instrument: Violin

Samvel Yervinyan (Armenian: Սամվել Երվինյան, born January 25, 1966) is an Armenian violinist and composer.

== Biography ==
Yervinyan was born in Yerevan, Armenia. He began studying at the age of 9 in Spenderian Music School under the tutoring of Armen Minasian. In the competitions he participated, he won all the first place prizes in his age group. He played Henry Vieuxtemps' 2nd concert on his graduation day and received a standing ovation from all the faculty members. He continued his studies at Tchaikovsky's Music Conservatory, under the guidance and tutoring of Maestro Edward Dayan. In the following years he became the professor's pride and strongest prospect for future concert violinist. At his graduation, he played several classical compositions including, Bach's Adagio and Fugue in G Minor, Mozart's violin concert No. 5 in A Major, Paganini's Caprice No. 21 in A Major, and Sarasate's Gypsy Melodies. In 1993 Yervinyan earned his PhD from Yerevan State Musical Conservatory.

== Tours with Yanni ==
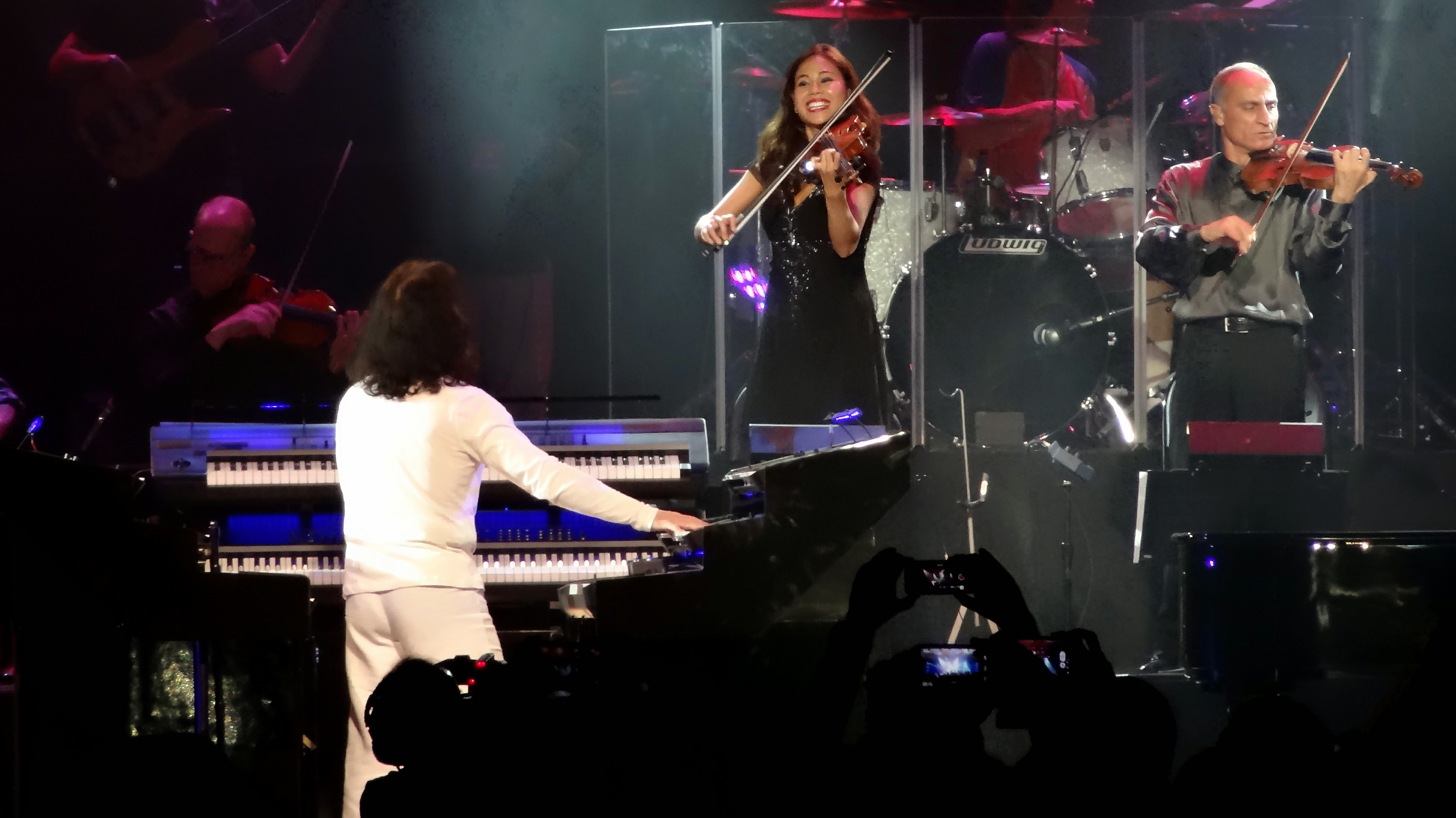
Samvel Yervinyan performs with Mary Simpson and Yanni at a Concert in Bangalore (India) on 18 April 2014 as part of Yanni's 2014 World Tour

- 2003 and 2004 - Ethnicity world tours
- 2005 - Yanni Live! The Concert Event and Yanni Voices tours.
- 2013 - 'World Without Borders' tour
- 2014 - World Tour
- 2015 - World Tour
- 2018 - 25th Acropolis Anniversary World Tour
- 2019 - Yanni by the sea "Egypt"
