= Barbie of Swan Lake =

2003 Canadian-American film

- DVD cover
- Directed by: Owen Hurley
- Written by: Elana Lesser; Cliff Ruby
- Based on: Swan Lake by Pyotr Ilyich Tchaikovsky
- Produced by: Kim Dent Wilder; Rob Hudnut
- Starring: Kelly Sheridan; Mark Hildreth; Kelsey Grammer; Maggie Wheeler; Kathleen Barr; Nicole Oliver
- Edited by: Greg Richardson
- Music by: Arnie Roth
- Production companies: Mainframe Entertainment; Mattel Entertainment
- Distributed by: North America: Artisan Home Entertainment (Family Home Entertainment); Overseas: Universal Pictures Video; UK and Ireland: Right Entertainment
- Release date: September 30, 2003
- Running time: 83 minutes
- Countries: Canada; United States
- Language: English

Barbie of Swan Lake is a 2003 animated fantasy film co-produced by Mainframe Entertainment and Mattel Entertainment, and distributed by Artisan Home Entertainment.

Based on the Tchaikovsky ballet Swan Lake, it is the third in the Barbie film series, with Kelly Sheridan providing the voice of Barbie.

Barbie of Swan Lake was released on VHS and DVD on September 30, 2003 by Artisan, later making a television premiere on Nickelodeon on November 16, 2003. It was subsequently released overseas through Entertainment Rights and Universal Pictures Video.

== Plot ==
The movie opens with Barbie as she tells following story to her little sister, Kelly, who is uneasy about being at overnight camp and doesn’t want to participate in a race the next day.

Odette is a young woman who lives in a small village with her father and sister and works in the family bakery. She is a talented dancer, but is shy about it. One day, a unicorn, Lila, runs through town and Odette follows her into an Enchanted Forest. Lila gets caught on a bush, so Odette removes a crystal from a rock to free her, while the other denizens of the forest watch in astonishment.

The Fairy Queen tells Odette that since she freed the magic crystal, she is destined to defeat the evil sorcerer Rothbart, who has taken over the forest. Odette, afraid to get involved, declines to help. However, she is confronted by Rothbart and cursed to become a swan. Although the Queen gifts Odette a tiara embedded with the magic crystal to protect her from Rothbart’s magic, the Queen can only partially reverse the spell; Odette is a swan during the day and regains her human form at night. Odette and Lila go meet Erasmus, a troll who takes care of a massive library, to find the Book of Forest Lore, which can tell them how to break the spell. Unfortunately, they are unsuccessful.

Back in the village, Prince Daniel is informed by his mother that it is time for him to marry and she is hosting a ball for him to choose a wife, although he much prefers adventuring. When he goes out hunting, he’s lured into the forest by Rothbart, who is determined to get Daniel to hunt and kill Odette. Just as he's about to shoot her down, Daniel is captivated by the swan's beauty and decides to let her live. Odette then transforms in front of him and protects him from Rothbart. The two of them spend the night together and fall in love. Daniel invites Odette to the ball the next night.

Erasmus finds the book and reveals that the key to defeating Rothbart is true love. However, if Daniel falls in love with another woman, the magic crystal will lose its power and Odette will die. Rothbart abducts Erasmus and the book. While Odette rescues Erasmus, Rothbart attends the ball with his daughter Odile, magically disguised as Odette. Odette flies to the castle in her swan form to warn Daniel, but is too late; Daniel pledges his love to Odile, causing Odette to collapse.

With the crystal's power gone, Rothbart takes it from Odette. In the Forest, he turns the Fairy Queen into a mouse. Odette wakes up as Daniel arrives to confront Rothbart. Rothbart's spell hits them both, their hands intertwined. At that moment, Rothbart is consumed by the crystal's magic, as Daniel and Odette tried to protect each other out of true love. Rothbart's evil is undone. Everyone from the village and the Forest celebrate as Odette and Daniel are to be married. Rothbart becomes a cuckoo clock while Odile ends up as a maid in Erasmus's library.

This story of courage gives Kelly new resolve and she promises she will participate in a race the following day.

== Cast ==
- Kelly Sheridan as Barbie / Odette – A shy, helpful country girl who loves to dance. She is turned into a swan by Rothbart because she is thought to be the one who can defeat him. Then, she falls in love with Prince Daniel and later learns to be a brave girl by saving the Enchanted Forest. Barbie is the storyteller of Swan Lake and Kelly's older sister.
- Mark Hildreth as Prince Daniel – A prince who loves adventures. He is an expert at archery. He loves Odette from the first time he meets her, however he is fooled by Rothbart who uses magic to help Odile impersonate Odette, with whom Daniel dances with at the ball. He is based on Siegfried from the ballet.
- Kelsey Grammer as Rothbart – The wicked sorcerer and the villainous cousin of the Fairy Queen who wants to rule the Enchanted Forest. He can turn into a bird, and he also turns Odette into a swan. He has a spoiled daughter named Odile. In the end, Rothbart is turned into a cuckoo clock as punishment for his wickedness.
- Venus Terzo as Lila – A sassy purple unicorn who is also Odette's friend. She likes to go to the village and is almost captured. She tells Odette that she (Odette) is braver than she thinks.
- Kathleen Barr as The Fairy Queen / Marie – The ruler of the Enchanted Forest. Marie is Odette's older sister who likes to ride horses.
- Nicole Oliver as Carlita – A Spanish-accented elf who is turned into a skunk by Rothbart. She’s Ivan's best friend and love interest.
- Ian James Corlett as Ivan – A Russian-accented elf who is turned into a porcupine. He’s Carlita's best friend and love interest.
- Maggie Wheeler as Odile – A witch and Rothbart's spoiled daughter who fools Prince Daniel at the ball by using magic to take on the form of Odette. In the end, she becomes a maid in Erasmus' library.
- Michael Dobson as Erasmus – A troll who has a library. The Book of Forest Lore which explains how to break Rothbart's spell is in his library.
- Chantal Strand as Kelly – Barbie's sister who’s afraid of a race at her camp as well as Kelly the elf who was turned into a cygnet.
- Gina Stockdale as Queen Mother – Daniel's mother who wants to see Daniel married and wants to have grandchildren.
- Brian Drummond as Reggie – Daniel's servant.
- Garry Chalk as the Baker – Odette's father.

== Production ==
The huge success of the first two Barbie videos, Barbie in the Nutcracker and Barbie as Rapunzel, led to Mattel deciding to make a third film. The movie was announced by Mainframe in September 2002. Barbie of Swan Lake's story is based on the 19th-century German fairy tale "Swan Lake".

As with Barbie's first ballet film, Barbie in the Nutcracker, Barbie of Swan Lake was choreographed by the New York City Ballet Master in Chief Peter Martins, and features the movement of New York City Ballet dancers computer animated through motion capture imaging. The dancers were filmed over two days for the ballet sequences with 16 light-emitting cameras that tracked their movements based on reflective squares attached to the dancers' elbows, wrists, and legs. The production team at Mainframe Entertainment then superimposed the motion capture data onto computer models of the movie characters, and animated the characters' faces. Motion capture performer Cailin Stadnyk portrayed Barbie's movements, while ballerina Maria Kowroski performed the character's dancing scenes.

=== New York City Ballet Dancers ===
- Maria Kowroski as Barbie/Odette
- Charles Askegard as Ken/Prince Daniel
- Ellen Bar as the Fairy Queen
- Benjamin Millepied as Ivan the Porcupine
- Janie Taylor as Carlita the Skunk
- Abi Stafford as the Fox

== Music ==
The film features Tchaikovsky's score from Swan Lake performed by the London Symphony Orchestra, with 15-year-old violinist Nicola Benedetti performing the violin solos. In addition, the film has a theme song that plays over the end credits, "Wings", written by Jason Blume and performed by Leslie Mills.

== Release ==
The film was released on VHS and DVD on September 30, 2003.

The DVD includes the bonus features "The Ballet Dances of Swan Lake", which showcases the film's ballet sequences with accompanying commentary for young viewers, "The Music in You", a 20 minute documentary profiling four girls studying at the Juilliard School of Music, and an interactive game, "Explore the Stars!," challenging children to identify the constellations.

As with the previous two Barbie movies, Entertainment Rights secured global distribution rights to the film outside North America, which remained as such despite the company losing international merchandising rights back to Mattel at the end of the year.

== Reception ==
=== Critical response ===
Joseph Szadkowski of The Washington Times praised the film as "beautiful" and "another triumph for Barbie that should inspire youngsters". Rating it two-and-a-half stars out of five, the New Straits Times' R. S. Murthi called it "charming" and wrote, "The CGI work is fluid and the dance choreography by the New York City Ballet [...] is superly translated." Scott Hettrick of the South Florida Sun-Sentinel wrote that the film has "all the elements of a good fairy tale that [are] delightfully translated here visually in this comforting, entertaining and engaging presentation."

Describing the film as "teem[ing] with villainy, magic and fantasy," Nancy Churnin in The Dallas Morning News wrote that Barbie of Swan Lake "exceeds expectations" and she noted its educational value. Reviewing the film for Video Business, Buzz McClain wrote, "Director Hurley overcomes the potential robotic coldness of the digital animation, which at times resembles that of a videogame, by infusing undeniable charm into the story and characters." McClain also noted the cultural value of the film's ballet sequences and classical music, highlighted in the DVD extras.

K. Lee Benson of The Video Librarian recommended Barbie of Swan Lake, calling it a "class act" and a "marked improvement" over the previous two CGI Barbie films. Lynne Heffley of the Los Angeles Times called it a "lavishly detailed computer-animated feature whose creativity and sweet nature nearly mitigates its unavoidable product promotion." Stephanie Prange of Video Store praised the film's animation as "truly beautiful, with bright colours and [a] polished look".

A review in The Daily Telegraph opined that "transformed into cartoon form, Swan Lake isn't exactly a masterpiece," but recommended the film as a way to introduce children to Tchaikovsky. In a negative review, Robert Gottlieb of The New York Observer opined that Barbie of Swan Lake's "divergences from the ballet are profoundly distorting. Nothing of the troubling heart of Swan Lake remains. Instead, we get a frisky, feminist unicorn and an adorable skunk! To call this Disneyfication is to insult the genius of early Disney and the professionalism of later Disney." Two eight-year-old reviewers for Newsday rated the film 4/5 stars, writing that they enjoyed its "beautiful music and dancing" and "nice message about believing in yourself."

In a 2021 retrospective review, The Sunday Telegraph called it a "gentle tale" and wrote, "The 2003 animation looks a bit dated now but it can still capture the imagination."

==== Criticisms of antisemitism ====
Some commentators have criticized the film for heavy use of anti-Semite stereotypes in the portrayal of the main villains, Rothbart and Odile. In an article for Summit News, Alex Diaz identified Rothbart and Odile as having predominantly Jewish ethnic features and alleged that key character traits such as their greediness, use of dark magic and ability to turn into birds perpetuate harmful stereotypes against Jewish people. Diaz noted that many of the aforementioned tropes exist in the Tchaikovsky source material and were not all introduced by Mattel.

=== Awards ===
- Video Premiere Award for Best Animated Video Premiere Movie — Nominated (Jesyca C. Durchin and Jennifer Twiner McCarron)
- Golden Satellite Award for Best Youth DVD — Nominated
- Video Software Dealers Association Home Entertainment Award for Best Direct-to-Video/Limited Release from an Independent Studio — Won
- Video Software Dealers Association Home Entertainment Award for Best Family Title of the Year From an Independent Studio — Won
- Video Software Dealers Association Home Entertainment Award for Sellthrough Title of the Year From an Independent Studio — Won

== Video game ==
A video game for Microsoft Windows and Macintosh was released in 2003 by Vivendi Universal Games. The game follows Odette and Lila the unicorn in a quest to break an enchanted spell that has removed the beauty from the lake and forest. Players must find ingredients to make magic wands to paint beauty back into the land, as well as help the creatures of the forest to solve puzzles.

== Cultural impact ==
In 2004, The Press reported that a "Barbie of Swan Lake phenomenon" was driving a surge in demand for tutus and ballet lessons in Christchurch, New Zealand.

Barbie of Swan Lake is frequently ranked by entertainment websites as being among the best films in the Barbie animated film franchise. In a 2021 Buzzfeed article, Sara Thompson highlighted the film as being among the media that represent "peak 2000s girl culture".

== See also ==
- List of Barbie films
