= Different for Girls (album) =

Studio album by Leslie Mills
- Released: September 30, 2003
- Label: Atlantic
- Producers: Leslie Mills, Chris Pelcer, John Shanks, David Kahne, Kevin Kadish

Professional ratings
Review scores
Source	Rating
AllMusic	3/5 stars

Different for Girls, Leslie Mills' debut album, was released in 2003 on Atlantic Records. The song "Good Life" was included on the soundtrack to the film, What A Girl Wants.

== Track listing ==
1. Different for Girls
2. Walk Along
3. Violet
4. Swim
5. Be My Water
6. Radiowave
7. Making My Way
8. Good Life
9. Rule the World
10. I Can't Wait
11. Ready to Rain
12. Far from All the Tears
13. Wings [Worldwide Bonus Track]
14. Circles Around The Sun [Japan Bonus Track]
