= Ming Freeman =

Taiwanese-Canadian musician and composer

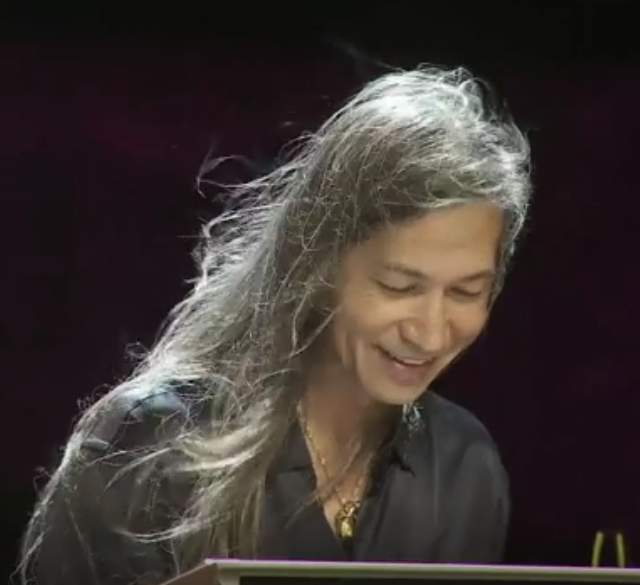

Background information
- Born: October 24, 1963 (age 62); Taiwan, Taiwan
- Origin: Taiwan
- Occupations: Musician, composer, producer
- Instruments: Keyboards, piano
- Website: mingfreeman.com

Ming Freeman (born 24 October 1963 in Taiwan) is a Taiwanese-Canadian multi-keyboardist and pianist, musical director, composer and producer who has toured or recorded with artists such as Joni Mitchell, Yanni, Ronnie Laws, Chuck Negron, Jeffrey Osborne, Paula Abdul, Sheena Easton, Gladys Knight, Jean Carne and Michael Henderson. Freeman is a featured keyboard soloist in many of Yanni's DVDs such as Tribute filmed in India and China, Yanni Live at Royal Albert Hall in London, Yanni Live! The Concert Event, and Yanni Voices. Freeman has been noted to handle the more advanced keyboard work during Yanni's shows.
