= Devotion: The Best of Yanni =

Compilation album by Yanni
- Released: August 26, 1997
- Recorded: 1986–1993
- Genre: Contemporary instrumental
- Length: 65:50
- Label: Private Music
- Producer: Yanni

Yanni chronology
Port of Mystery (1997)	Devotion: The Best of Yanni (1997)	Nightbird (1997)

Devotion: The Best of Yanni is a compilation album by keyboardist and composer Yanni, released on the Private Music label in 1997. The album peaked at #1 on Billboard's "Top New Age Albums" chart and at #42 on the "Billboard 200" chart in the same year.

== Content ==
Nine of this compilation's fifteen tracks are from two of Yanni's quieter recordings, Dare to Dream in 1992 and delicate In My Time in 1993. Those selections, intermingled with an assortment of the keyboard player's more dynamic works ("Santorini" and "Within Attraction") create a generally satisfying survey of Yanni's first seven albums (Niki Nana and Optimystique are not represented here). The CD's packaging claims that this is the best of Yanni and the album does offer a decent overview of his work, with a tilt toward his gentler side. "The End of August" and "Marching Season" are presented as performed in concert on the album Live at the Acropolis.

== Critical reception ==
Professional ratings
Review scores
Source	Rating
AllMusic	4/5 stars

In a review by Jonathan Widran of AllMusic, "For a time in the mid-'90s, Private Music was issuing Yanni samplers on a regular basis, prompting the casual fan to wonder if the love-him-or-hate-him new age phenomenon had ever indeed released a real studio album before. A lot of the anti-Yanni sentiment comes not from people who've heard the bulk of his material, but those who simply reject the idea of simply stated, pretty, top-down music as bad for some reason. It never gets too deep, but the same could be said of a lot of pop music. For those new to the Yanni experience, this disc is a good place to start."

== Track listing ==
No.	Title	Original album	Length
1.	"Once Upon a Time"	Dare to Dream (1992)	3:50
2.	"Within Attraction"	Out of Silence (1987)	4:10
3.	"Song for Antarctica"	Polar Shift (1991) (non-Yanni album)	4:23
4.	"Aria"	Dare to Dream	4:00
5.	"A Love for Life"	Dare to Dream	5:06
6.	"Reflections of Passion"	Chameleon Days (1988)	4:31
7.	"To Take... To Hold"	In My Time (1993)	3:59
8.	"Only a Memory"	In My Time	4:16
9.	"Flight of Fantasy"	Reflections of Passion (1990)	5:40
10.	"To the One Who Knows"	Dare to Dream	5:37
11.	"The End of August"	Live at the Acropolis (1994)	3:46
12.	"Marching Season"	Live at the Acropolis	2:39
13.	"Santorini"	Keys to Imagination (1986)	4:35
14.	"Nice to Meet You" (Special Radio Edit)	Dare to Dream (album version: 5:47)	3:20
15.	"A Night to Remember"	Dare to Dream	5:49

== Production ==
- Art Direction: Sonny Mediana
- Design: Jackie Salway
- Photography: Lynn Goldsmith

(Production as described on the CD liner notes.)

== Certifications ==
Region	Certification	Certified units/sales
United States (RIAA)	Gold	500,000^{^}
^{^} Shipments figures based on certification alone.
