= Hooligans or Rebels? =

1981 sociology book by Stephen Humphries

- Author: Stephen Humphries
- Subject: Sociology of childhood
- Publisher: Basil Blackwell
- Publication date: 1981
- Pages: 279
- ISBN: 0631129820

Hooligans or Rebels? An Oral History of Working-Class Childhood and Youth, 1889–1939 is a 1981 sociology book written by Stephen Humphries and published by Basil Blackwell.
