= Armen Movsessian =

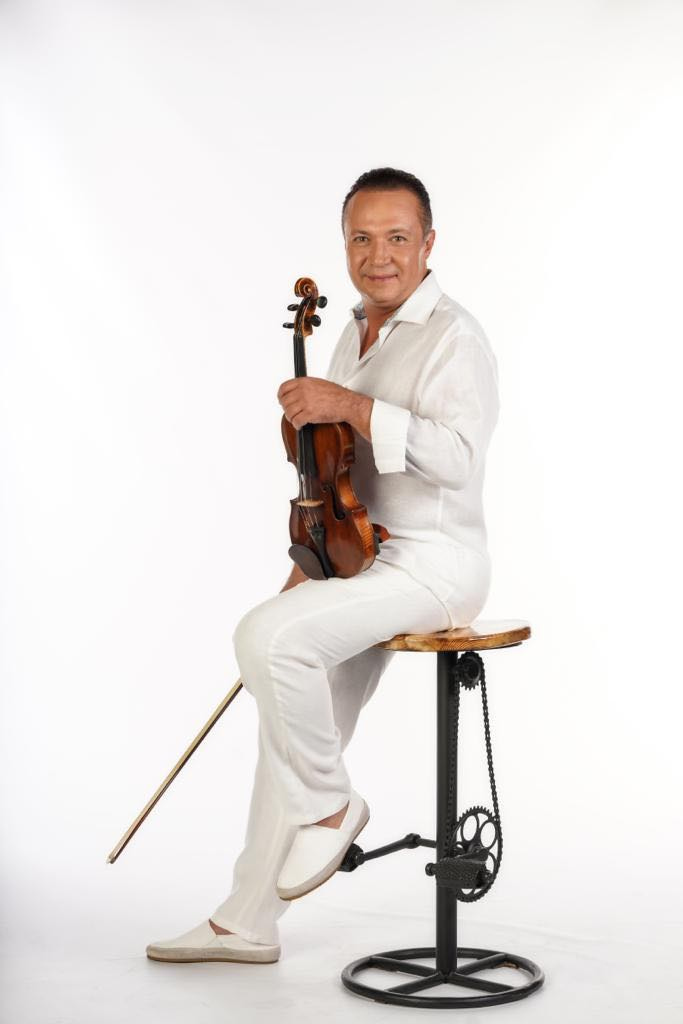

Background information
- Born: August 8, 1969 (age 55); Yerevan, Armenian SSR
- Occupation(s): Composer, musician
- Instrument: Violin

Armen Movsessian (Armenian: Արմեն Մովսեսյան, born August 8, 1969) is a violin player.

== Education ==
1976-1987 - Tchaikovsky School of Music (Yerevan, Armenia)

1987-1990 - Yerevan Conservatory named after Komitas (Yerevan, Armenia)

1990-1992 - Longy School of Music (Cambridge, MA)

== Biography ==
Born and raised in Yerevan, Armenia, Armen Movsessian has always had a passion for music. At the Tchaikovsky School of Music in Yerevan, Armenia, under the direction of Professor Mokatsian, Armen Movsessian started his formal violin instruction at the age of seven. He graduated from the Tchaikovsky School of Music for musically gifted students with a high school certificate, and the Yerevan Conservatory named after Komitas awarded him his bachelor's and master's degrees. In 1989, Armen was appointed a Concertmaster of the newly formed Armenian Youth Philharmonic Orchestra. Later on, only fifty-four violinists from around the world received an invitation to the 1990 International Violin Competition of Indianapolis, and he was one of them.

=== United States ===
He made the decision to immigrate to the United States at this time, and he has since been appointed Concertmaster for the New Hampshire Symphony Orchestra as well as the Panama National Symphony in Panama City. Armen taught violin, viola, and chamber music at Clark University in Massachusetts and taught violin at the Longy School of Music where he also earned his Artist Diploma in Performance with Distinction in 1992 under the leadership of Professor Sophie Vilker. He participated in Yanni's 2003 and 2004 global Ethnicity tours, the 2005 Yanni Live! The Concert Event, and the Yanni Voices tours. Now residing in Los Angeles, California, he performs with several orchestras and runs his own violin studio, the Movsessian Violin Studio. In various orchestras in the United States and South America, Armen held the positions of principal and concertmaster. Armen relocated to Los Angeles in 2002, where he worked with the Los Angeles Opera and notable film studios including Warner Bros, Sony/MGM, Paramount, Universal, NBC, and others, scoring for more than 120 films after making his stage debut with the Yanni World Tour in 2003. With a sold-out performance at the Pasadena Civic Auditorium in 2010, Armen introduced his audience to a new band called Forbidden Saints. A new record called Forbidden Saints Live was then released in 2011. He has also worked and recorded with many artists including Luciano Pavarotti, Placido Domingo, Ray Charles, Barry White, Yanni, Sarah Brightman, Andrea Bocelli, Tony Bennett, Frank Sinatra Jr., Smokey Robinson, Olga Tanon, Jose Jose, Lucero, Cristian Castro, Olga Tanon, Kamo Seyranyan, Harout Pamboukjian, Armenchik, and many more. Armen Movsessian is a distinctive and extraordinarily well-rounded artist since he combines his classical training with jazz, rock, and pop.

== Experience ==
1987-1990 - Armenian Youth Philharmonic Orchestra - Concertmaster (Yerevan, Armenia)

1994-1995 - Panama National Symphony - Concertmaster (Panama City, Panama)

1992-1998 - New Hampshire Symphony Orchestra - Concertmaster (Manchester, NH)

1993-2002 - Rhode Island Philharmonic Orchestra - First Violin Section (Province, RI)

1995-2002 - Clark University - Violin, Viola and Chamber Music Instructor (Worcester, MA)

1998-2002 - Longy School of Music - Violin Instructor (Cambridge, MA)

2002-2009 - Los Angeles Opera - General Director Placido Domingo, Music Director Kent Nagano, Sub Violin (Los Angeles, CA)

2002-2010 - Yanni Voices - Band/Orchestra, World Tour 2003, 2004, 2005, 2009 - Solo Violin

2002–Present - Los Angeles Motion Picture Recordings - Studios: Sony Pictures Studios, Paramount Pictures Studios, Warner Brothers Studios, CBS Studios, FOX Studios - Violin

2011–Present - Forbidden Saints Band - Music Director / Solo Violin
