= Niki Nana =

Studio album by Yanni
- Released: August 24, 1989
- Genre: Instrumental
- Length: 39:41
- Label: Private Music
- Producers: Peter Baumann; Yanni

Yanni chronology
Chameleon Days (1988)	Niki Nana (1989)	Reflections of Passion (1990)

Niki Nana is the fifth studio album by Greek keyboardist and composer Yanni, released in August 1989 by Private Music.

== Background ==
By 1989, Yanni had released four studio albums, the most of recent of which was Chameleon Days (1988). When he started work on a follow-up record, he took a musical departure as he had explored music of an orchestral nature on his first three albums, in particular using synthesised strings. For Niki Nana, Yanni incorporated more rock-oriented arrangements with rhythm dominating the music, for which he used his time playing in rock bands in his early career as inspiration.

"Niki Nana (We're One)" started as an instrumental track and Yanni felt it had a celebratory feel, hearing "people singing and dancing" of a South American or African flavour. He then decided to incorporate words from the Greek, Zulu, English, and Spanish language as an attempt to present the theme of unity.

Yanni dedicated the album to his parents, Sotiri and Felitsa, in the liner notes.

== Release ==
Professional ratings
Review scores
Source	Rating
AllMusic	3/5 stars

The album peaked at No. 2 on the Billboard New Age albums chart.

In 1992, lyrics in Greek were written for the track "Nightbird" by Greek lyricist Tasoula Thomaïdou. The song was called "Mia Ellada Fos" (A whole Greece of Light) and was performed by the Greek-Cypriot singer Konstantina in her personal album of the same name in 1992.

== Track listing ==
No.	Title	Length
1.	"Niki Nana (We're One)" (Sterling, Yanni)	5:19
2.	"Dance with a Stranger"	4:59
3.	"Running Time"	5:57
4.	"Someday"	4:34
5.	"Human Condition"	5:09
6.	"First Touch"	2:58
7.	"Nightbird"	6:00
8.	"Quiet Man"	4:32

== Personnel ==
"Niki Nana":

- Lyrics: Tom Sterling and Yanni
- Vocal Arrangement: Morgan Ames
- Choir recorded by Hank Cicalo at Alpha Studios, Los Angeles
- Lead Vocal - Carmen Twillie
- 2nd Lead Vocal - Venette Gloud
- Guitars - Joaquin Lievano
- Morgan Ames Choir - Venette Gloud, Clydene Jackson-Edwards, Angel Rogers, Carmen Twillie, Randy Crenshaw, Arnold McCuller, Josef Powell, Tim Stone, Terry Young.
- Special thanks to Bo Russell and Bonnie Fury for their help on this song.

"Dance with a Stranger":

- Flugelhorn and Trumpet - Nolan Smith, Jr.
- Flugelhorn - Ralf Rickert
- Guitars - Joaquin Lievanno

"Running Time":

- Trumpet - Jerry Hey
- Trumpet - Gary Grant
- Saxophone - Dan Higgins
- Trombone - Bill Reichenbach Jr.
- Guitars - Joaquin Lievanno
- Vocals - Carolyn Johnson-White
- Horns recorded at John Tesh's private studio

"Human Condition":

- Lead Vocals - Carmen Twillie
- Additional Vocals - Venette Gloud

"Nightbird":

- Bouzouki - Spiro Katsemeges
- Guitars - Joaquin Lievano
- Sound effect design by Larson Sound Center
- Sound effect created by Russell Brower
- Acoustic, electronic drums and percussion - Charlie Adams

== Production ==
- All music composed and produced by Yanni
- Produced by Peter Baumann
