= Africa (2013 TV series) =

2013 British nature documentary television series

- Series title card from UK broadcast
- Genre: Nature documentary
- Narrated by: David Attenborough (BBC version); Forest Whitaker (Discovery version, except episode six)
- Composers: Sarah Class, Will Slater
- Country of origin: United Kingdom
- Original language: English
- No. of episodes: 6 (BBC); 7 (Discovery)

Production
- Executive producer: Mike Gunton
- Producer: James Honeyborne
- Running time: 60 minutes
- Production companies: BBC Natural History Unit; Discovery Channel; China Central Television; France Télévisions

Original release
- Network: BBC One; BBC One HD
- Release: 2 January – 6 February 2013

Africa is a 2013 British television series created by the BBC Natural History Unit. It focuses on wildlife and wild habitats in Africa, and was four years in the making. It consists of six hour-long episodes and six 10-minute-long featurettes.

== Broadcast ==
As Africa was broadcast on BBC One in the United Kingdom, the six episodes are each an hour in length, comprising the main programme and a 10-minute featurette called Eye to Eye which details the filming of a particular event.

In the United States, Africa was broadcast as a seven-part series on the Discovery Channel starting from 8 January 2013. While the first five episodes are redubbed in the American version as Forest Whitaker gives narration, the sixth ("Africa: The Future") is left untouched as David Attenborough presents the episode on-screen. The seventh is a compilation of the Eye to Eye making-of featurettes.

In China, it was broadcast on the Chinese language version of CCTV-9.

In Singapore, only five episodes of Africa are broadcast on Mediacorp Okto on Animal Nights. The Animal Nights from 15 July 2013 to 24 July 2013 was used to broadcast the documentary. Each telecast was on the Mondays, Wednesdays, and Fridays of the week from 9pm-10pm.

== Episodes ==
No.	Title	Original release date	UK viewers (millions)
1	"Kalahari"	2 January 2013	8.52
The series opens in Africa's south west corner and features the wildlife and landscapes of the Kalahari and Namib deserts. Starlight cameras reveal previously unfilmed nocturnal behaviour of black rhinos as they socialise at a Kalahari waterhole, and super slow motion footage captures a fierce battle between two male giraffes. Other sequences show Namibia's famous and mysterious fairy circles, how a fork-tailed drongo's talent for mimicry allows it to steal a meal from a meerkat clan, how ostrichs help their chicks find water, how red-billed queleas defend their nests from marauding armoured bush crickets, and how wheel spiders escape spider wasps. Also, for the first time, cameras enter the world's largest underground lake in Dragon's Breath Cave and film the critically endangered golden cave catfish. Eye to Eye looks behind the scenes of the rhino and giraffe filming by cinematographer Martyn Colbeck.
2	"Savannah"	9 January 2013	7.52
East Africa is the subject of the second programme, from the glaciated peaks of the Rwenzori Mountains to the savannahs and caustic soda lakes of the Great Rift Valley. The filmmakers focus on the life and death decisions animals must make in this ever-changing region. On the savannah, agama lizards play a game of dare as they approach a sleeping pride of lions to catch flying insects. Ancient forests in the Savannah are now roamed with mountain gorillas. A shoebill chick is filmed attacking its weaker sibling, forcing the parents to abandon it. On the plains of Amboseli, the worst drought for 50 years claims the life of an elephant calf, one of hundreds which perish from starvation. Their resilience and adaptability is highlighted by the returning rains, which bring together large herds to socialize. In Eye to Eye, cameraman Mark Deeble discusses the ethics of filming the dying elephant calf.
3	"Congo"	16 January 2013	7.97
The third episode visits the Congo Basin and features some of the creatures which inhabit its two million square miles of jungle. In the canopy, a chimpanzee is filmed extracting honey from a bees' nest using a variety of branches as tools, whilst underground, a female African rock python incubates her eggs by coiling her warm body around them. Rare footage shows the nesting behaviour of Picathartes and a gathering of forest elephants at Dzanga bai. Other sequences show African skimmers, leaf-folding frogs and luminous fungi. Loango in Gabon is one of the few remaining places where the jungle meets the ocean. African forest buffalo, hippo, elephants and red river hogs emerge from the forest to sunbathe and swim. Eye to Eye shows the difficulties of filming in the Congo.
4	"Cape"	23 January 2013	7.58
The fourth instalment shows how Southern Africa is influenced by two very different ocean currents. The warm Agulhas Current generates rainfall in Mozambique's interior, where butterflies gather on the summit of Mount Mabu to court and breed. The cold Benguela Current influences the Western Cape, where little rain falls. The intense heat makes incubating eggs a difficult prospect for African penguins. In spring, as Namaqualand is transformed into a desert garden, the drama of a monkey beetle's love life plays out in a single flower. Springbok dance in the rainy season for joy. Great white sharks, a school of dolphins 5,000 strong, and a 15 m Bryde's whale are filmed in the rich feeding grounds of the Atlantic. Eye to Eye reveals how the opening sequence, documenting the first few minutes of a green turtle hatchling's life, was constructed.
5	"Sahara"	30 January 2013	6.52
The penultimate episode opens in the cedar forests of the Atlas Mountains, where Barbary macaques have become isolated from other primates by the expanding Sahara. Aerial photography shows the Sahara is a landscape dominated by rock. Animals featured include Grévy's zebra and naked mole-rats, each found on the desert's fringes. Two million barn swallows are forced to cross the Sahara on their migrations, congregating at a poisoned oasis to feed on flies. The last remaining freshwater pools are home to stranded desert crocodiles, filmed hunting tilapia fish. Macro photography reveals the struggles of dung beetles and silver ants, the latter able to survive exposure to the brutal midday sun thanks to their reflective body coating. Eye to Eye shows how an 18-month time lapse sequence of Libya's sand dunes was filmed.
6	"The Future"	6 February 2013	6.58
The theme of the final programme is environmental issues affecting Africa's wildlife, including poaching, habitat loss, climate change and human population growth. Attenborough profiles the work of conservationists and scientists across the continent, drawing attention to projects which are helping to protect threatened species such as the black rhino and the mountain gorilla. He visits a Maasai tribe to feature a project which is helping to reduce human-lion conflict, an underpass used by elephants to move between feeding grounds and a sea turtle rehabilitation centre. A civil war ravaged Gorongosa National Park in Mozambique, but concerted efforts are now being made to restore the whole ecosystem. Eye to Eye follows Attenborough on his Africa shoot, culminating in an encounter with a blind baby rhino.

== Reception ==
The series received critical acclaim.

== Merchandise ==
=== DVD and Blu-ray ===
The series was released in the UK as a three-disc DVD (BBCDVD3741) and Blu-ray (BBCBD0227) box set on 18 February 2013. Region 1 DVD and Blu-ray box sets of the Discovery series were released on 26 February 2013.

=== Book ===
An accompanying hardcover book called Africa: Eye to Eye with the Unknown (ISBN 9781780879147) was published by Quercus on 6 December 2012. It was written by Michael Bright, a former BBC Natural History Unit producer, with a foreword by David Attenborough. The book is divided into chapters which correspond to the six programmes in the TV series. A separate chapter explains how the series was made.

=== Soundtrack ===
A soundtrack (silcd1421) was released on 18 March 2013.

=== Calendar ===
An official 2014 calendar (ISBN 9781780544748) was released on 16 September 2013.
