= Caves of Namibia =

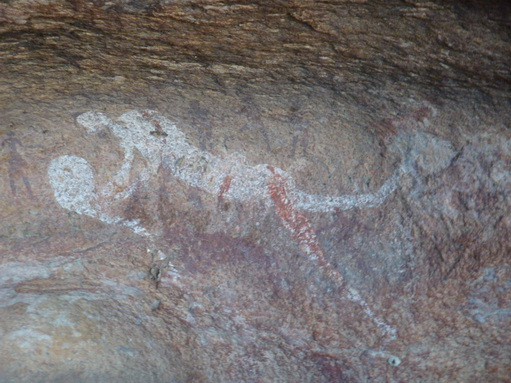
Geisterhöhle, Namibia

Namibia, a country in south-western Africa, has a total of 124 known caves, 41 of which are situated in the Otjozondjupa Region.

In several of these caves, research has been done and published in various journals, but for some of caves, the location is not commonly known, as the information got lost over the years. Some locations are also deliberately kept secret to protect the caves. The locations are being kept secret because of caves and their rock art getting destroyed and carved out by people. Some of the caves with rock art are now protected by bars. This helps tourists to be able to see them without destroying them.

== History ==
The caves known to local people were reported by early explorers and travelers. The caves of Namibia are not reputed for their beauty, but for their practical and curiosity reasons.

A common belief is that caves were used as shelter places by the San people (Bushmen). However, the San did not use caves for shelter, as most caves of Namibia have vertical entrances and also are situated on top of elevations. Caves were used only when they were accessible and allowed observation over the surrounding area and when room existed at the entrance to shelter. Resources like water, bird eggs, and honey were used by the local people.

From 1882 to 1915, the Imperial German colonial troops were interested in caves, as they provided a water supply for pack animals in remote areas. Cave pools which were accessible were used as water points for police patrols and resistance fighters alike.

As years passed, landowners became interested in caves, as due to World War I and World War II, nitrate was regarded as a strategic resource and could no longer be used in fertilizers. Nitrate minerals were replaced by bird guano, but only a small quantity was used locally; the rest was exported. As no fertilizer was available, farmers searched caves and used bat guano as an alternative. From 1935 to 1942, more than 10,000 tons of bat guano was extracted from Arnhem cave, and smaller caves like Nooitgedacht, Otgrot, Valle, and others were mined.

From 1963, research was done on various caves all over Namibia by locals and researchers from foreign countries, including Australia, Austria, France, Germany, and more. A problem with researchers from other countries is that they do not ensure that their results and reports are available in Namibia and so valuable information is then lost.

== Notable caves ==
- Aigamas Cave in the Otjozondjupa region harbours the only known mainland population of a cavefish (Clarias cavernicola) in Southern Africa.
- Apollo 11 Cave in the ǁKaras Region of south-western Namibia, approximately 250 kilometres (160 mi) southwest of Keetmanshoop. This cave contained some of the oldest pieces of mobile art ever discovered in southern Africa, radiocarbon dated to 27,500–25,500 BP.
- Dragon's Breath Cave: The cave was first discovered and entered by Roger Ellis of the South African Spelaeological Association in 1986 during an expedition to discover new caves in the Otavi/Grootfontein/Tsumeb area. John Irish, an entomologist at the National Museum of Namibia, and Jacques Martini of the South African Geological Survey Department conducted speleological research on the geology and fauna of the cave. In 1987, a cave-diving expedition was led by Roger Ellis and Charles Maxwell to explore the underwater extent of the cave. Dragon's Breath Cave was subsequently surveyed and listed in the Guinness World Records book as the largest non-subglacial underground lake in the world. Dragon's breath was surveyed by multibeam sonar from the autonomous underwater vehicle Sunfish in 2019.
- The Ghaub Caves in southern Oshikoto Region in the centre of the Otavi Triangle (Tsumeb – Otavi – Grootfontein) have been declared a national monument in 1967, the only caves in Namibia with that status.
- Harasib Cave, a flooded dolomite cave near Dragon's Breath, was partly surveyed in 2019 using multibeam sonar from the autonomous underwater vehicle Sunfish.
- Caves beneath Otjikoto Lake and Lake Guinas: Both of these lakes were created by collapsing dolomite caves, and have submerged caves on their perimeters. Lake Guinas was surveyed by multibeam sonar from the autonomous underwater vehicle Sunfish in 2019.
- Leopard Cave: A 60 m^{2} (650 sq ft) rock shelter in the northern Erongo Mountains. The cave has an extensive archaeological record.
