= James Honeyborne =

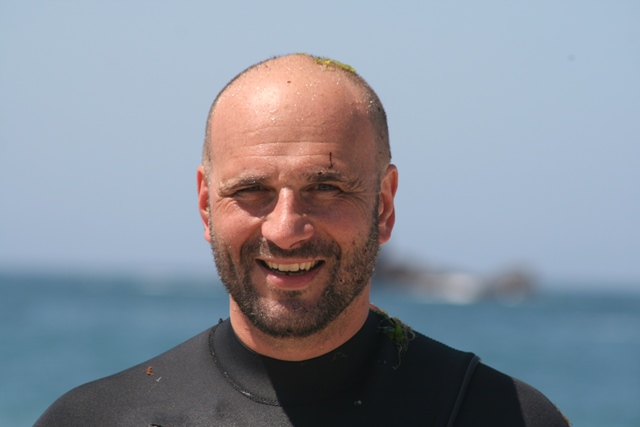
- Born: James Christopher Honeyborne
- Education: Newcastle University; Ampleforth College
- Occupations: Filmmaker, environmentalist
- Years active: 1992–present

James Honeyborne is the creative director of Freeborne Media, he previously worked as an executive producer at the BBC Natural History Unit where he oversaw some 35 films, working with multiple co-producers around the world. His projects include the Emmy Award and BAFTA-winning series Blue Planet II, the Emmy Award-nominated series Wild New Zealand with National Geographic (U.S. TV channel), and the BAFTA-winning BBC1 series Big Blue Live with PBS.

Honeyborne conceived Blue Planet II in 2013. It was first broadcast on BBC1 in October 2017.

He spent five years on attachment to John Downer Productions, co-directing the series Supernatural and Weird Nature, before returning to the BBC to make Wildlife on One documentaries with David Attenborough and to work on the strand Natural World (co-produced by Animal Planet and National Geographic Channel).

A keen scuba diver and photographer, he has also made a series of documentaries with world champion freediver Tanya Streeter.

From 2009 to 2013, he was series producer for Africa the BBC TV series which aired in 2013. In 2019, he signed an overall deal with Netflix.

== Early life ==
Honeyborne attended Ampleforth College and studied biology at the University of Newcastle-upon-Tyne. He graduated in 1992 and joined the BBC Natural History Unit in the same year.

== Filmography ==
=== Executive producer ===
Blue Planet II (BBC1 2017)

Mountain: Life at the Extreme (BBC2 2017) – delivered

Wild Alaska Live (BBC1 2017) – Development Exec / Business Winning Exec

New Zealand: Earth's Mythical Islands (BBC2 2016)

- Nominated Best Cinematography, Royal Television Society Craft Awards
- Nominated Outstanding Narrator, EMMY – Sam Neill
- Nominated Best Natural History Documentary, Grierson Awards

Patagonia: Earth's Secret Paradise (BBC2 2015)

Big Blue Live (BBC1 2015):

- Winner, BAFTA TV Awards, Best Live Event
- Nominated Best Science & Natural History Documentary, Royal Television Society Programme Awards
- Nominated, Technical Innovation, Wildscreen

Japan: Earth's Enchanted Islands (BBC2 2015):

- Nominated Best Science & Natural History Documentary, Royal Television Society Programme Awards
- Nominated Best Grading, Royal Television Society Regional Awards, West of England
- Winner, Award for Excellence, Guild of TV Cameramen

Alaska: Earth's Frozen Kingdom (BBC2 2015):

- Nominated Best Cinematography, Royal Television Society Regional Awards, West of England

Wonders of the Monsoon (BBC2 2014):

- Winner, Best Composer, Royal Television Society Regional Awards, West of England
- Nominated Best Cinematography, Royal Television Society Regional Awards, West of England
- Nominated Best Sound, Royal Television Society Regional Awards, West of England
- Winner, Award for Excellence, Guild of Television Cameramen
- Nominated Best Composer, Jackson Hole
- Nominated Best Cinematography, Wildscreen

Autumnwatch (BBC2 2014):

24 Hours on Earth (BBC1 2014):

- Nominated Best Sound, Royal television Society Regional Awards, West of England

=== Series producer ===
Africa (BBC1 2013):

- Nominated, Best TV Series, Freesat Awards
- Winner, Best Series Wild Talk Africa
- Winner, Cinematography, Wild Talk Africa
- Nominated, Music, Wild Talk Africa
- Winner, Best Film, Green Screen Awards
- Winner, Best Post-production, Green Screen Awards
- Winner, Best Animal Behaviour, Jackson Hole
- Nominated, Conservation Hero, Jackson Hole
- Winner, Best Limited Series, Jackson Hole
- Nominated, Marian Zunz Newcomer, Jackson Hole
- Nominated, Best Cinematography, Jackson Hole
- Nominated, Best Editing, Jackson Hole
- Winner, Best Documentary, Prix Italia
- Bronze Award, APG Creative Strategy Awards
- Nominated, Best photography, RTS Craft Awards
- Winner, Grand Prize for Documentary (Nature and Environment), International Gold Panda Awards, Sichuan TV Festival
- Winner, Best Long Documentary (Nature and Environment), International Gold Panda Awards, Sichuan TV Festival
- Winner Best Wildlife Film, New York Film Festival
- Winner, Best in Festival, New York Wild Film Festival
- Winner, Cinematography, Royal Television Society Regional Awards, West of England
- Winner, Music, Royal Television Society Regional Awards, West of England
- Winner, Best Science and Natural History Documentary, Royal Television Society Programme Awards
- Nominated, Photography: Factual, British Academy Television Craft Awards
- Nominated, Sound: Factual, British Academy Television Craft Awards
- Guild of Television Camera Award for Excellence
- Winner, Best Specialist Factual, Televisual Bulldog Awards
- Winner, Best Cinematography, Televisual Bulldog Awards

=== Feature Director ===
Meerkats the Movie (2007)

- Winner, Grand Prix Earth, Tokyo International Film Festival
- Best of Festival, Wild Talk Africa Film Festival
- Winner, Best Editing, Wild Talk Africa Film Festival
- Winner, Best Sound Design, Wild Talk Africa Film Festival
- Nomination, Best Music, Wild Talk Africa Film Festival
- Nomination, Best Script, Wild Talk Africa Film Festival
- Winner, The Silver Teton, Jackson Hole
- Nomination, Best Theatrical, Jackson Hole

=== TV producer ===
Natural World (BBC2 2006) - Buddha, Bees and the Giant Hornet Queen

- Winner Best Programme (over $500,000), IWFF Missoula
- Nominations for cinematography, animal behaviour and music, IWFF Missoula.
- Winner, Best People and Nature Award, Japan Wildlife Film Festival
- Nomination, Animal Behaviour, Jackson Hole
- Winner, Special Jury Prize, Festival de l'Oiseau
- Nomination, Parthenon Entertainment Award for Innovation, Wildscreen Festival
- Nomination, News & Documentary EMMY for outstanding individual achievement in a craft, cinematography

Dive Galapagos (BBC2 2005)

- Winner, Best Presenter, IWFF Missoula
- Winner, World Underwater Festival, Antibes
- Diving with Whales (BBC2 2005)
- Nomination, News & Documentary EMMY for outstanding individual achievement in a craft, cinematography
- Wildlife On One (David Attenborough):

Dragonfly (BBC1 2004)

- Nomination at Japan Wildlife Film Festival
- Winner at Festival International du Film Ornithologique de Ménigoute
- Nomination, Best Editing, Wildscreen
- Nomination, Editing, Broadcast Young Talent Award

Peregrine (BBC1 2004)

- Nomination at the European Nature Film Festival, Valvert
- Winner Best animal behaviour: International Festival de l'Oiseau
- Winner Grand Prix du Festival: Festival International du Film Ornithologique de Ménigout

Pelican (BBC1 2001)

- Winner Grand Prix du Festival: International Festival de l'Oiseau
- Nomination, Best Cinematography, Jackson Hole

=== John Downer Productions ===
Weird Nature (BBC1 2002)

- Winner RTS Award for Picture enhancement and also Design and Craft Innovation
- Winner best animal behaviour and winner best TV series, IWFF Missoula Also 4 craft merit awards
- EMMY nominations in Cinematography and Best Direction
- Winner Most innovative documentary award and winner Best Nature documentary award, Shanghai Film Festival

Supernatural (BBC1 1999)

- Winner RTS Craft Award for Design and Craft Innovation
