= Supernatural: The Unseen Powers of Animals =

Television series

DVD cover.

Supernatural: The Unseen Powers of Animals, also called Supernature, is a six-part British nature documentary television miniseries that was produced by John Downer Productions and commissioned by the BBC Natural History Unit, the same team behind the earlier successful shows Supersense and Lifesense. The program was narrated by Andrew Sachs and originally broadcast in the United Kingdom on BBC1 in 1999. The theme of the series was "the unseen power of animals."

== Episode list ==
- Extrasensory Perception
- Outer Limits
- Hidden Forces (directed by James Honeyborne)
- Time Warp
- Paranormal
- Close Encounters

DVD Extra:

- Superstars (Behind the scenes)

== Awards ==
Supernatural: The Unseen Powers of Animals won two awards at the Royal Television Society Programme Awards in 1999, for innovation and graphic design.

== Merchandise ==
A Region 2 DVD (BBCDVD1990) featuring all six 30-minute episodes was released on 21 August 2006.
