= Inspirato =

Studio album by Yanni
- Released: March 24, 2014
- Genre: New-age, classical
- Length: 50:50
- Label: Sony Classical
- Producer: Yanni; Plácido Domingo; Ric Wake

Yanni chronology
Playlist: The Very Best of Yanni (2013)	Inspirato (2014)	Sensuous Chill (2016)

Inspirato is the fifteenth studio album by Yanni, released in 2014. To create the album, Yanni collaborated with opera tenor Plácido Domingo and producer Ric Wake to select distinguished vocalists to perform songs that Yanni had previously released over his career.

== Content and production ==
The album's tracks are based on selected songs from throughout Yanni's career, but have newly created lyrics sung by distinguished vocalists having opera backgrounds. The dominant language of the album's lyrics is Italian. The album, with its lyrical and classical elements, was characterized as reflecting a radical change in Yanni's style. Despite the album's use of opera singers, Yanni emphasized the album was "not opera."

Yanni collaborated with tenor Plácido Domingo and producer Ric Wake to match Yanni's songs to the respective vocalists. In part because of the distinguished vocalists' schedules, the project is said to have required four years to complete.

== Contributors to album ==
The following individuals contributed to Inspirato (listed alphabetically).

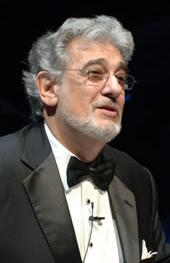
Plácido Domingo

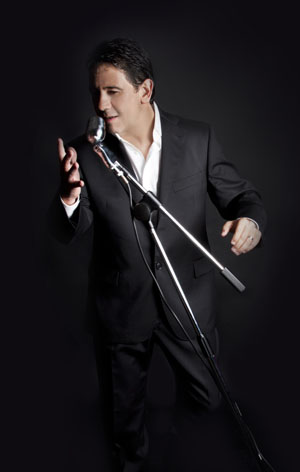
Plácido Domingo Jr.

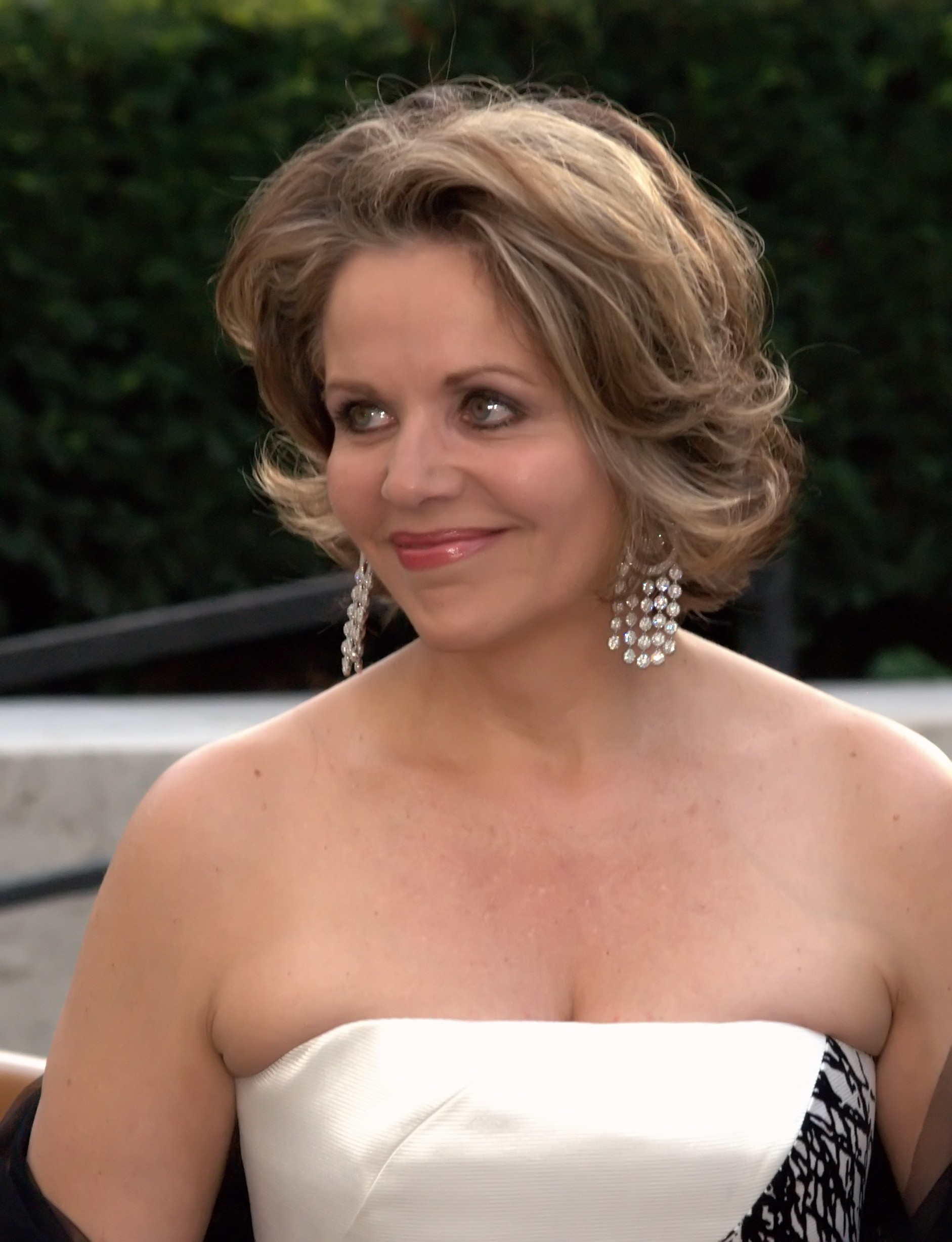
Renée Fleming

Vittorio Grigolo

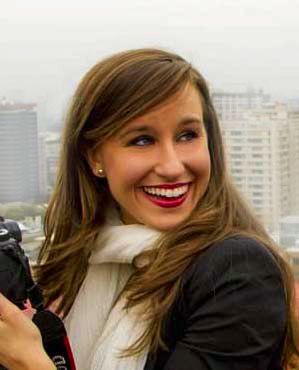
Lauren Jelencovich

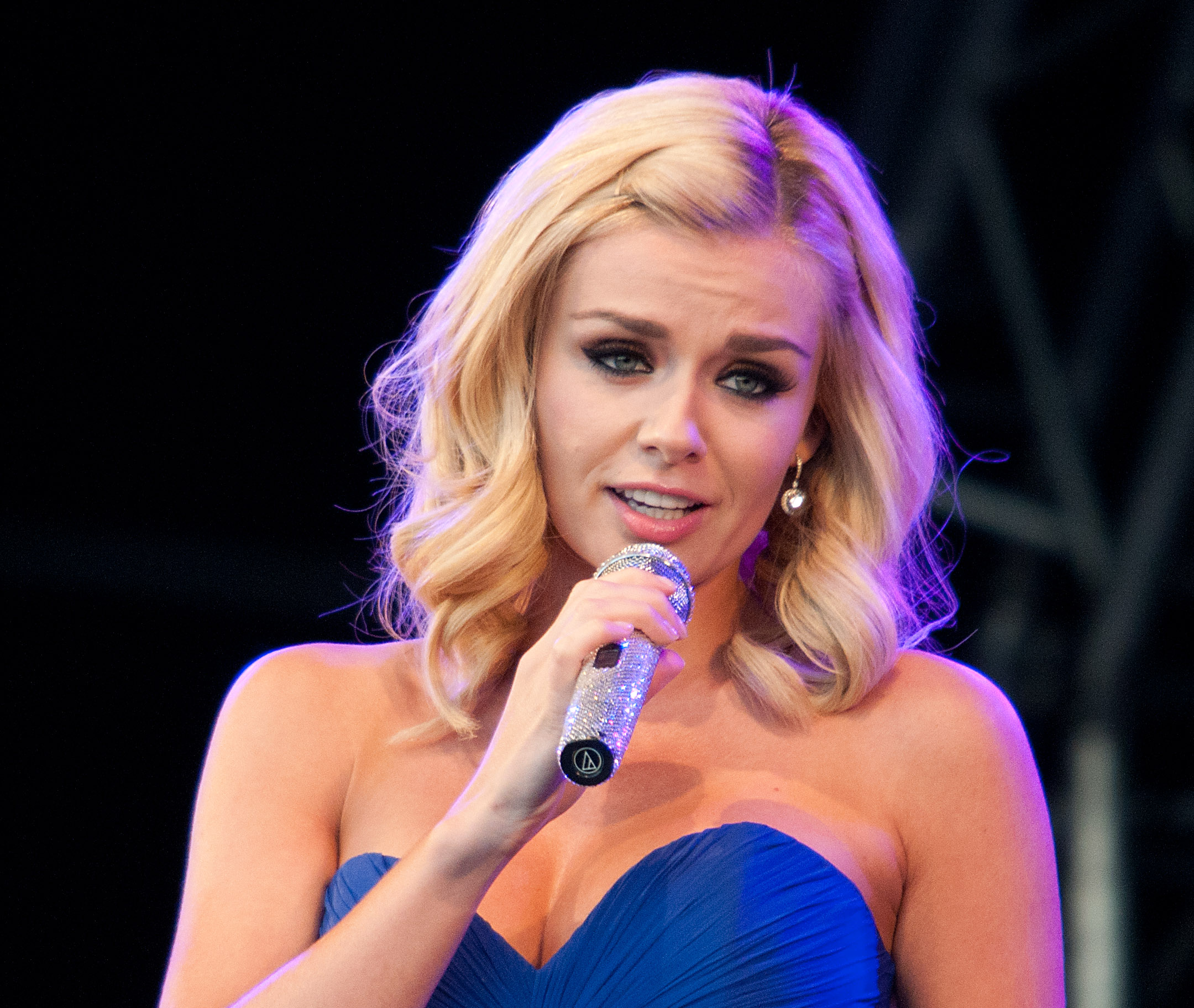
Katherine Jenkins

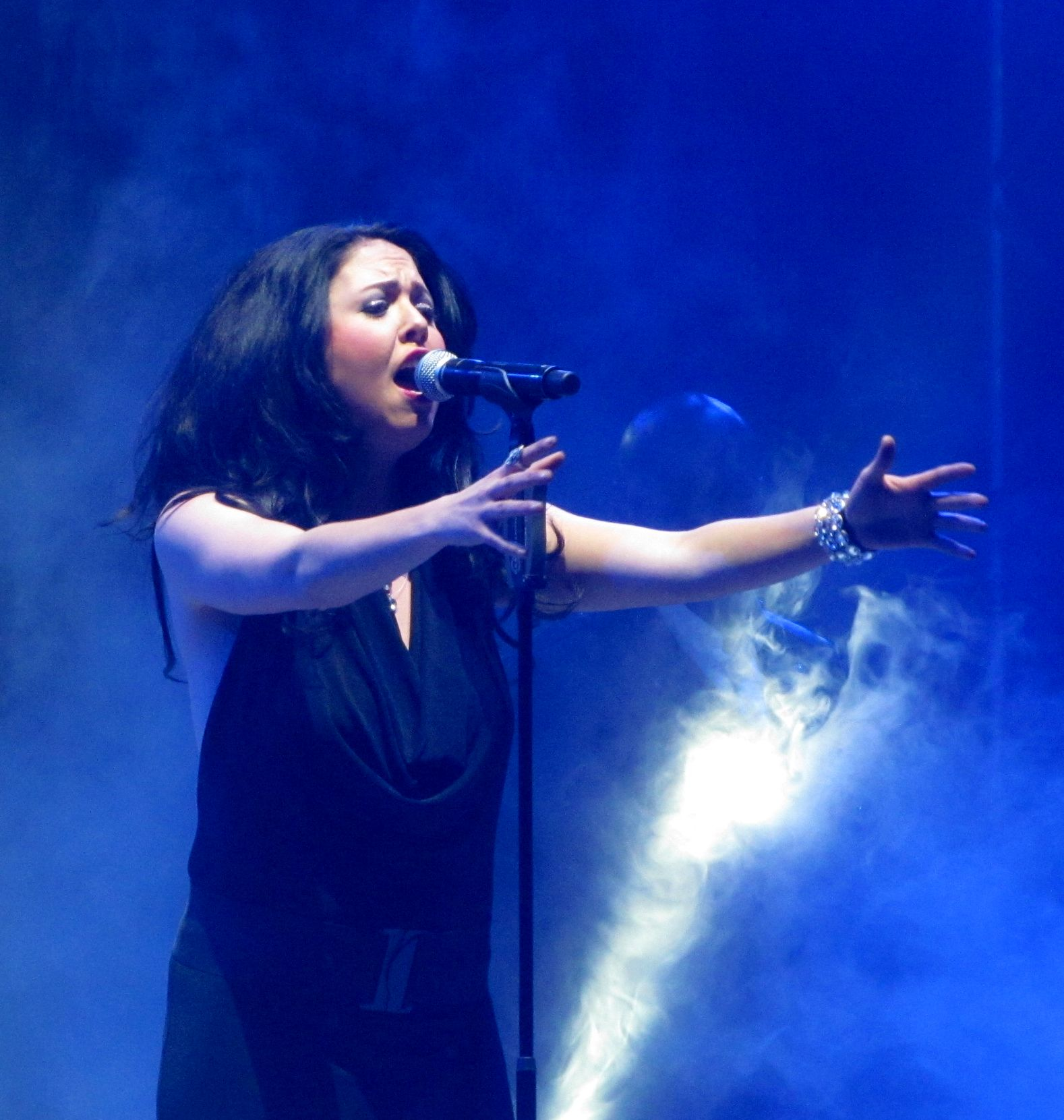
Chloe Lowery

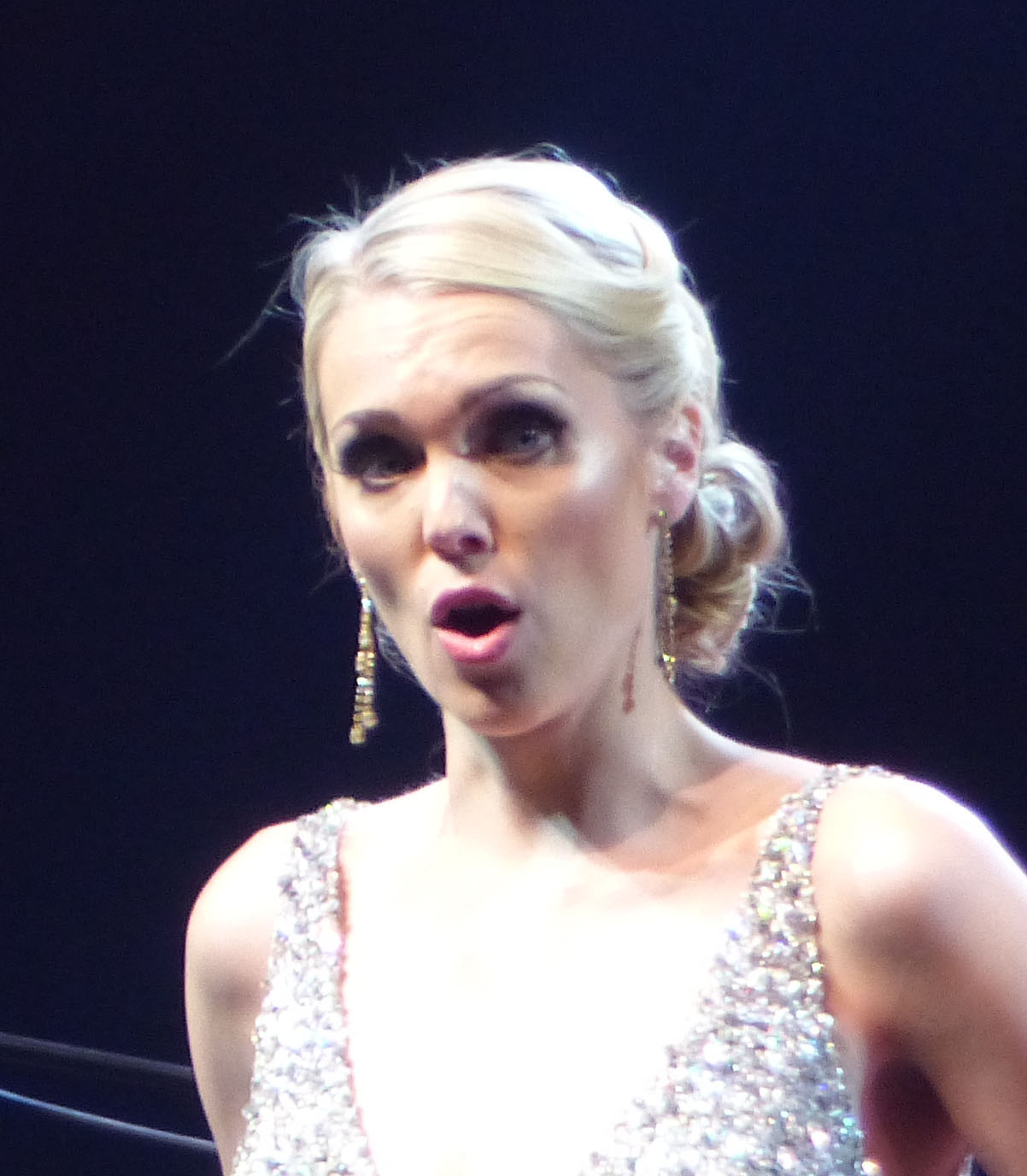
Micaëla Oeste

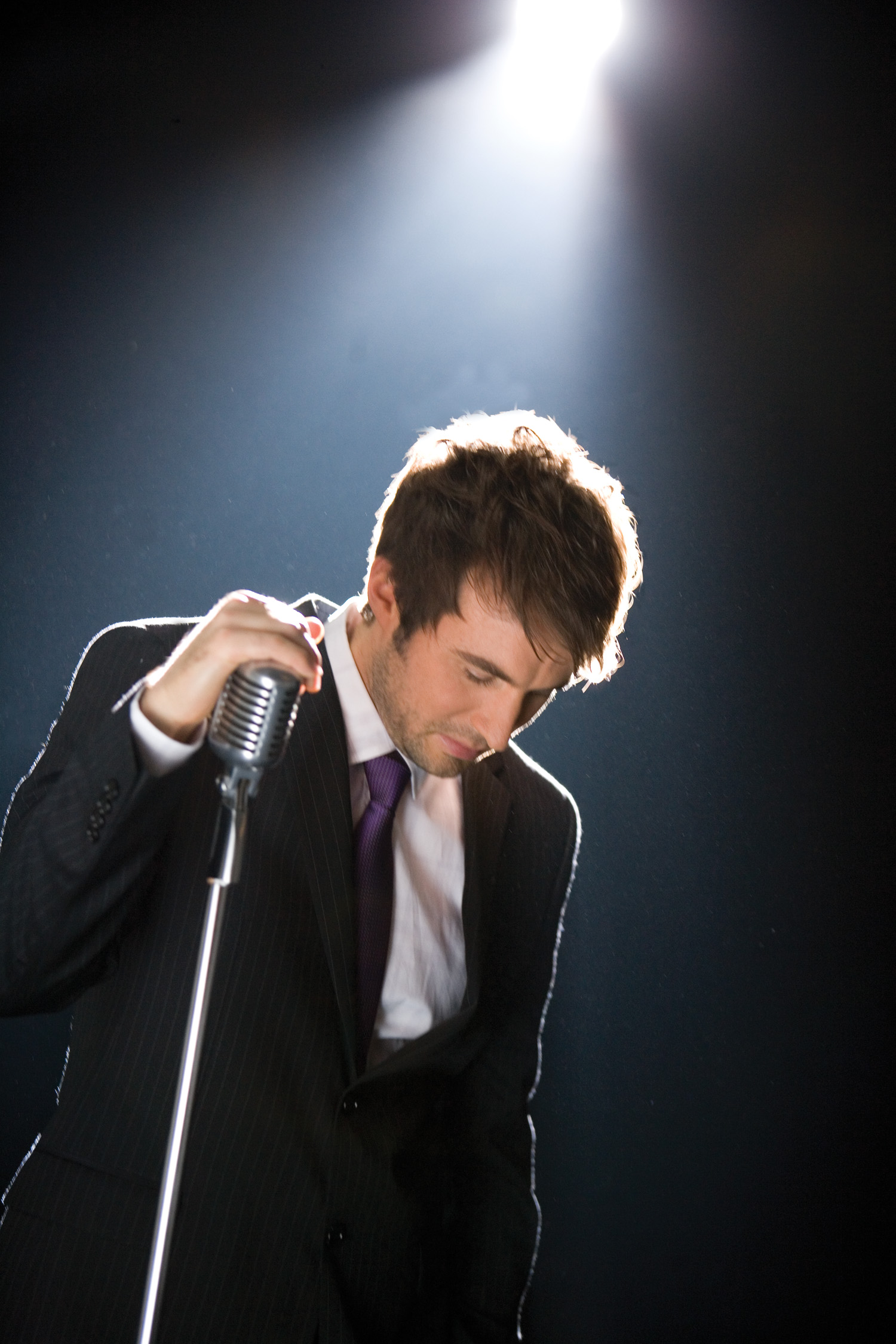
Nathan Pacheco

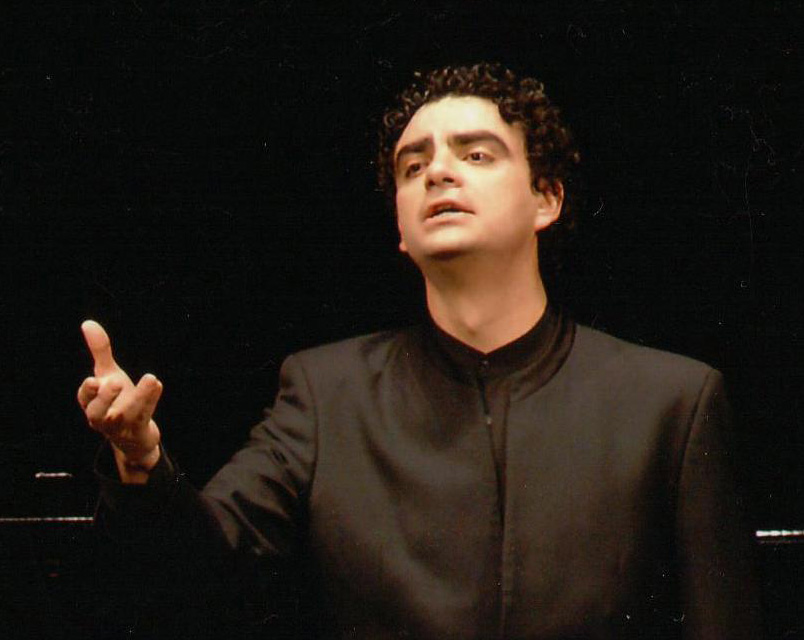
Rolando Villazón

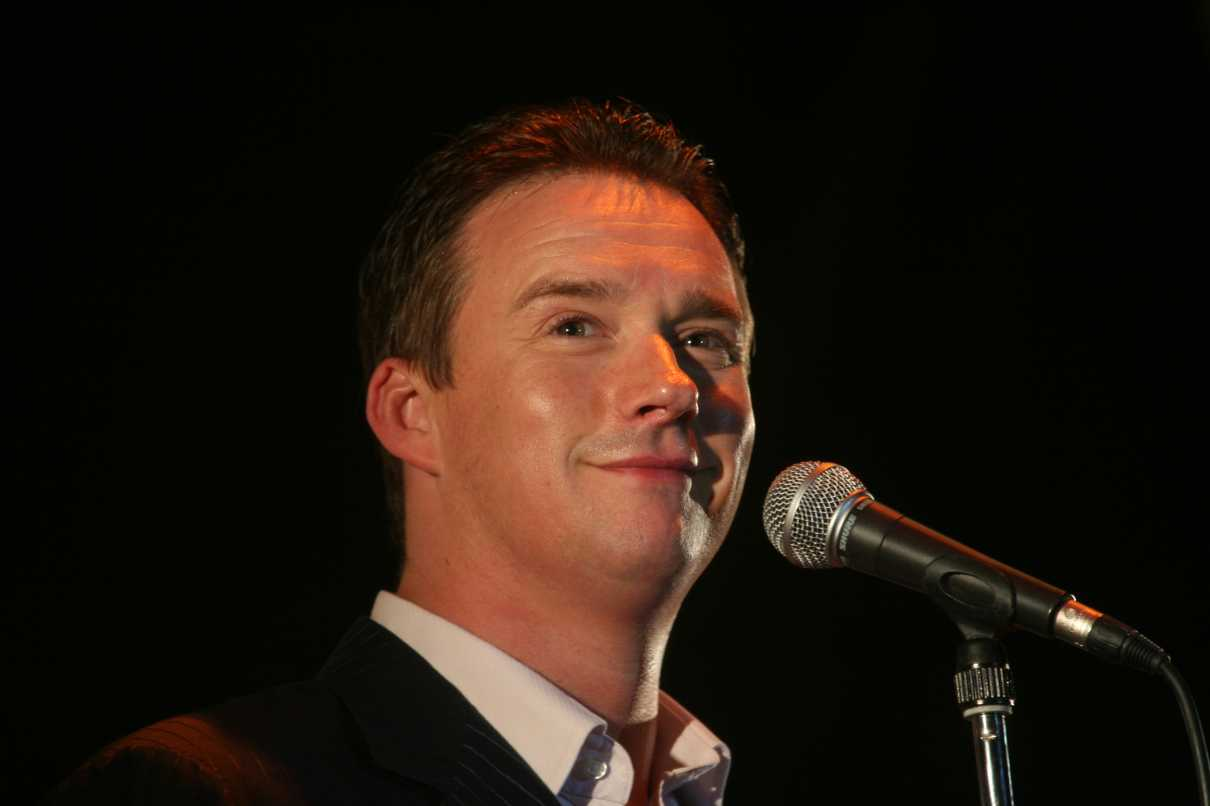
Russell Watson

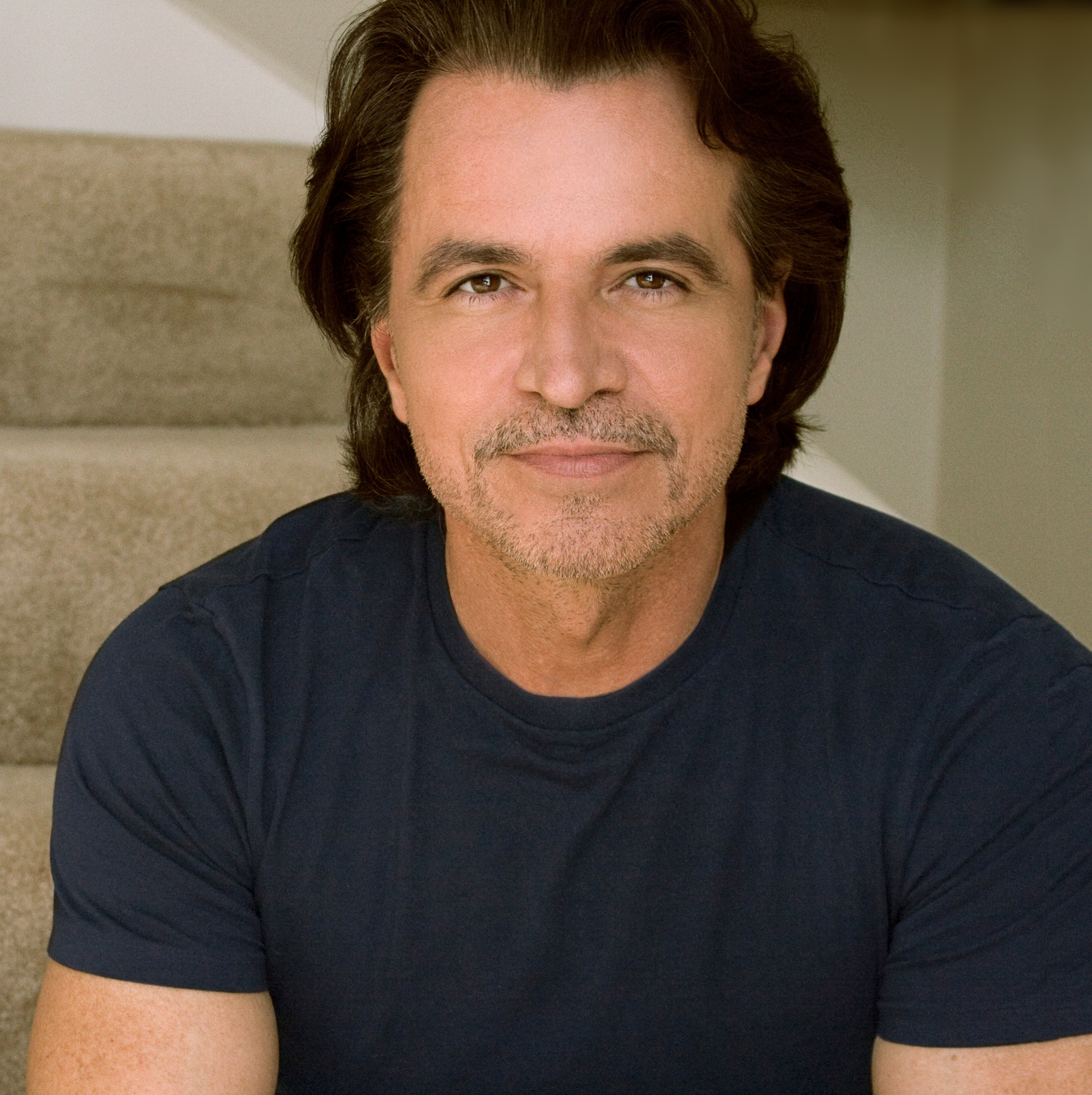
Yanni

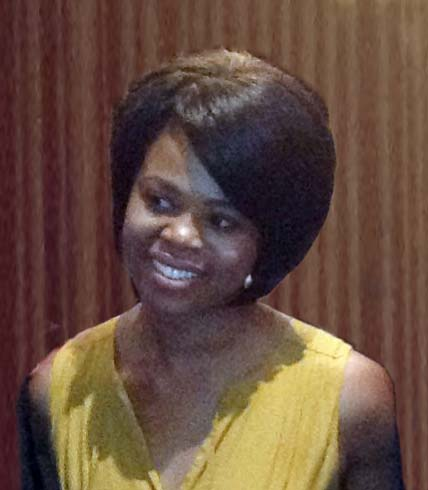
Pretty Yende

== Track listing ==
Inspirato includes the following tracks.

Except for the adaptation Ode À L'Humanité (Aria), all songs were written and composed by Yanni.

No.	Title	Guest vocalist	Length
1.	"I Genitori" (Parents); Previous release: "To Take... To Hold" on In My Time (1993)	Renée Fleming	3:59
2.	"Come un sospiro" (Like a Sigh); Previous release: "Almost a Whisper" on Reflections of Passion (1990)	Vittorio Grigolo	3:42
3.	"Ode Alla Grecia" (Ode to Greece); Previous release: "The End of August" on In My Time (1993)	Plácido Domingo	4:51
4.	"L'Ombra Dell'Angelo" (Shadow of an Angel); Previous release: "Nice to Meet You" on Dare to Dream (1992)	Katherine Jenkins	3:32
5.	"Amare Di Nuovo" (To Love Again); Previous release: "Adagio in C Minor" on Tribute (1997)	Nathan Pacheco	3:01
6.	"Hasta El Último Momento" (Until the Last Moment); Previous release: "Until the Last Moment" on Live at the Acropolis (1994)	Plácido Domingo and Renée Fleming	3:27
7.	"Riconoscimento" (Tribute); Previous release: "Tribute" on Tribute (1997)	Plácido Domingo, Nathan Pacheco, Plácido Domingo Jr., Micaëla Oeste and Chloe Lowery	4:38
8.	"Incanto" (Enchantment); Previous release: "Enchantment" on In My Time (1993)	Russell Watson	4:07
9.	"Il Primo Tocco" (The First Touch); Previous release: "First Touch" on Niki Nana (1989)	Plácido Domingo Jr.	3:01
10.	"Usignolo" (Nightingale); Previous release: "Nightingale" on Tribute (1997)	Lauren Jelencovich	5:14
11.	"La Prima Luce" (The First Light); Previous release: "In the Morning Light" on In My Time (1993)	Rolando Villazón	3:15
12.	"Ode À L'Humanité" (Ode to Humanity); Previous release: "Aria" on Dare to Dream (1992). Adapted from The Flower Duet, from the Léo Delibes opera Lakmé (1883)	Pretty Yende	4:02
13.	"Nello Specchio" (In the Mirror); Previous releases: "In the Mirror" on Dare to Dream (1992) and as bonus track on Swept Away single (1988)	Katherine Jenkins and Nathan Pacheco	4:01

== Production ==
- Produced by Yanni & Ric Wake
- All music composed by Yanni, except "Ode À L'Humanité". The song is loosely based upon a short, but beautiful part of the 19th century French opera, Lakmé, by Léo Delibes.
- Engineered by Yanni & Travis Meck
- Arranged and mixed by Yanni
- Orchestrations by Yanni & Colin O'Malley
- All music recorded at Yanni's Private Studios
- Mastered by Chris Bellman at Bernie Grundman Mastering, Los Angeles
- Executive Producers: Yanni, Plácido Domingo, Ric Wake & Don Franzen
- Art Direction & Design: Norman Moore, DesignArtLA.com
- Cover Photography: Krystal Ann
- Additional Photography: Silvio Richetto & Whit Padgett

== Reception ==
Inspirato peaked at #1 in Billboard's Top New Age Album category for 2014 and 2015, and was Billboard's No. 11 selling New Age album of 2014.

In March 2015, Inspirato received the Best Album of the Year award from Reviews New Age (Spain). The album's extension of Yanni's style into the lyrical and classical was characterized by Reviews New Age's Alejandro Clavijo as being an overwhelming success.

== See also ==
- Yanni discography
- Yanni Voices
