= Apollo 11 Cave =

Archeological site in ǁKaras, Namibia

- Location within Namibia
- Location: ǀAi-ǀAis/Richtersveld Transfrontier Park
- Coordinates: 27°45′S 17°6′E
- Geology: quartzite

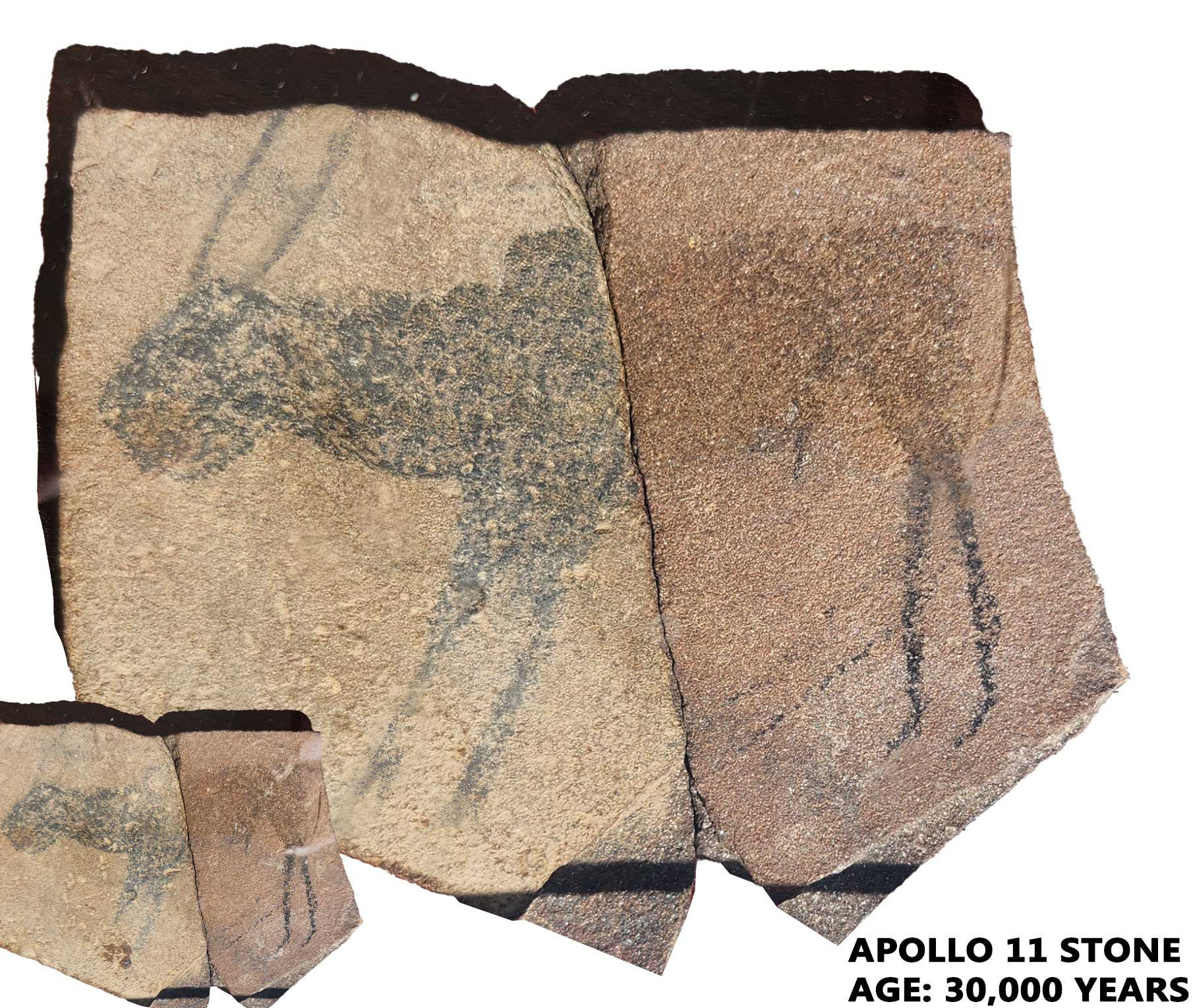
Apollo 11 Cave rock art, oldest figurative art in Africa. Small inset is the original image, the larger image has been minimally modified for clarity

The Apollo 11 Cave is an archeological site in the ǀAi-ǀAis/Richtersveld Transfrontier Park of south-western Namibia, approximately 250 km (160 mi) southwest of Keetmanshoop. The name given to the surrounding area and presumably the cave by the Nama people was "Goachanas". However, the cave was given its name by German archaeologist Wolfgang Erich Wendt (1934-2015) in reference to Apollo 11's then-recent return to Earth.

== Overview ==
The Apollo 11 rock shelter deposits were accumulated in a series of human "occupational pulses" over an interval of at least 40 millennia from ~71 ka to 29 ka ago, as confirmed by two independent sources.

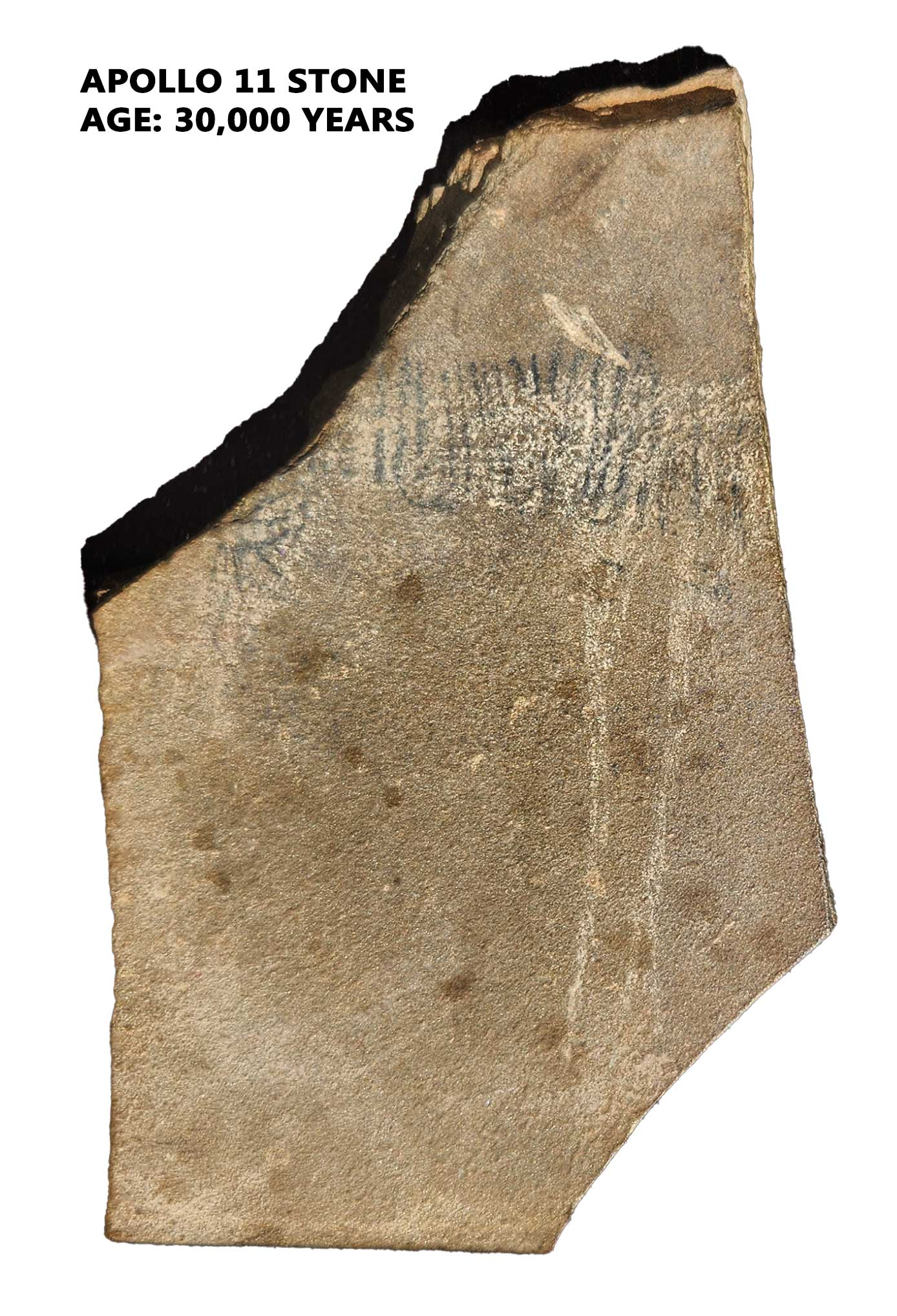
The shoulders, neck and partial head of a Zebra, drawn 30,000 years ago in Africa.

The cave, which is more of a rock overhang than a cave, once contained some of the oldest pieces of mobile art ever discovered in southern Africa and the oldest depictions of figurative art in Africa, carbon-14 dated to c. 30,000 years BP. The art slabs found in this cave are referred to as the Apollo 11 Stones. In total, seven grey-brown quartzite slabs were excavated from the cave. These items are now housed at the National Museum of Namibia in Windhoek.

The most famous of the stones depicts a drawing of a therianthropic figure that combines human hind legs with an antelope's abdomen, legs, neck and horns, and a feline predator's head into one creature.

Besides the slabs, the cave contained several white and red paintings. The subject of paintings ranged from simple geometric patterns to bees, which are still a nuisance to the unwary traveler.

Art was also found near the cave in the form of engravings on the banks of a riverbed and a large limestone boulder located 150 m (490 ft) from the cave. The engravings, which are mostly difficult to see without angled light, consist of depictions of animals as well as simple geometric patterns.

Researchers who returned to the cave in 2007 found the site had been "severely vandalized" and appealed for government protection of the area.

== See also ==
- Caves of Namibia
- Upper Paleolithic
- Late Stone Age
- Apollo 11 in popular culture
