= Micaëla Oeste =

Opera singer

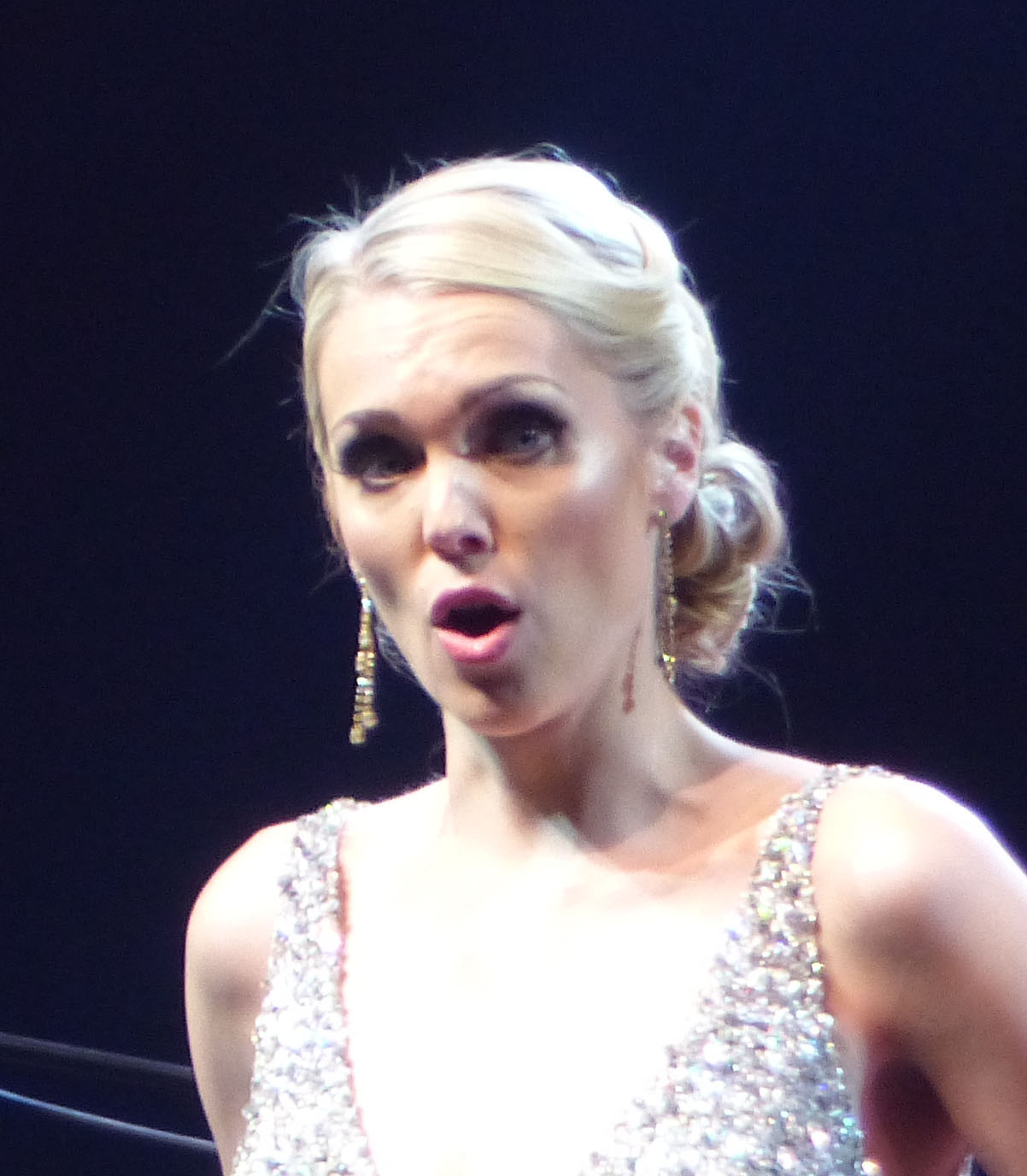
- Oeste in 2016
- Born: 1982 (age 43–44); Germany
- Education: University of Central Arkansas (B.Mus.); Bienen School of Music (M.A.)
- Occupation: Soprano singer
- Years active: 2008–present
- Website: micaelaoeste.com

Micaëla Oeste (born 1982) is an American operatic soprano.

== Life and career ==
Oeste was born in Germany, where her singer parents, Wolfgang and Patty Oeste, were based. In 1988, the family moved back to the United States and settled in Conway, Arkansas. She studied at Conway High School, and obtained her Bachelor of Music degree in vocal performance from the University of Central Arkansas. She then pursued further studies under Karen Brunssen at the Bienen School of Music of Northwestern University and obtained a master's degree in 2008.

After graduation, she enrolled in Domingo-Cafritz Young Artist Program of Washington National Opera and remained until 2010. During the stint, in which she was mentored by Plácido Domingo, she performed in several roles, including Annina in La traviata, Nannetta in Falstaff, first Niece in Britten's Peter Grimes, and the Woodbird in Wagner's Siegfried. In May 2010, she replaced Elizabeth Futral as Ophélie during a performance of Hamlet.

Oeste performed in the "Riconoscimento" ("Tribute") track in Yanni's 2014 album, Inspirato.

Oeste was featured in the world premiere of William Maselli's opera Draculette in concert performance on October 4, 2014 at Merkin Concert Hall.

Since October 2021, Oeste has performed with André Rieu and his Johann Strauss Orchestra.
