= Patagonia: Earth's Secret Paradise =

- Series title card from UK broadcast
- Also known as: Wild Patagonia
- Genre: Nature documentary
- Narrated by: Santiago Cabrera
- Composer: Will Slater
- Country of origin: United Kingdom
- Original language: English
- No. of episodes: 3

Production
- Executive producer: James Honeyborne
- Production location: Patagonia
- Running time: 59-60 minutes
- Production companies: BBC Natural History Unit; Animal Planet

Original release
- Network: BBC Two; BBC Two HD
- Release: 25 September – 9 October 2015

Related
- Atlantic: The Wildest Ocean on Earth; New Zealand: Earth's Mythical Islands

Patagonia: Earth's Secret Paradise is a nature documentary series exploring the landscapes and wildlife of Patagonia. The series was broadcast in three parts in the United Kingdom, where it premiered in September and October 2015 on BBC Two and BBC Two HD.

== Episodes ==
No.	Title	Produced and directed by	Original air date
1	"Fire and Ice"	Tuppence Stone	25 September 2015
A glimpse at the rarely seen South American wilderness, from the Andes to Cape Horn. Cameras reveal the lives of pumas and hummingbirds, follow condors over glacial peaks and explore monkey puzzle forests dating back to the time of the dinosaurs. The extreme kayakers who gain thrills and excitement from traversing the area's raging waterfalls are observed, as are the native cowboys, known as gauchos, as they round up wild horses.
2	"Heat and Dust"	Nick Smith-Baker	2 October 2015
This episode follows the path of the relentless wind sweeping east through Patagonia's dry desert from the Andes' peaks. The programme shows maras—a large relative of the guinea pig—and penguins, and the first faltering steps of baby guanacos. Cameras also observe the people who have taken on this inhospitable environment and carved out a home for themselves.
3	"Life on the Edge"	Evie Wright	9 October 2015
The final instalment looks at the 4,000-mile coast that stretches from the cold waters of Cape Horn—where rockhopper penguins overcome huge challenges to raise their young—to the far north's much warmer climate, where huge elephant seals battle for position in the heat of the desert. Orcas hunt the beaches, grabbing seal pups to feed their young, and fishermen are also incentivised to gather the sea's bounty.

== Reception ==
A review in The Guardian wrote "It's beautiful and moving and also sad. And that's about right for Patagonia."

=== Edited footage ===
Footage of a volcanic eruption shown in the series was created by combining footage of two separate volcanic eruptions: lightning recorded in the ash cloud of the 2011–2012 Puyehue-Cordón Caulle eruption was incorporated into footage of the 2015 eruption of Calbuco. The altered footage was widely shared on social media before its origins became public. The Observer reported that some staff at the BBC's natural history unit were "incensed" at the inclusion of the "deliberately doctored sequence".
