= Dolphins – Spy in the Pod =

Nature documentary series

- Genre: Factual
- Directed by: John Downer
- Narrated by: David Tennant
- Country of origin: United Kingdom
- Original language: English
- No. of series: 1
- No. of episodes: 2 (list of episodes)

Production
- Producer: Robert Pilley
- Running time: 60 minutes
- Production company: John Downer Productions Discovery Channel

Original release
- Network: BBC One; BBC One HD
- Release: 2 January – 9 January 2014

Related
- Penguins: Spy in the Huddle

Dolphins – Spy in the Pod is a British factual television series that was first broadcast on BBC One on 2 January 2014. The two-part series was narrated by David Tennant and produced by John Downer Productions. The series was also broadcast by Discovery Channel in the US.

== Production ==
Approximately 900 hours of filming took place over the course of one year. Remote-control underwater "spy cameras" disguised as sea creatures – including dolphins, ray, sea turtle, tuna, squid, nautilus and pufferfish – allowed the film-makers to get close-up footage of natural dolphin behaviour. Bottlenose dolphins, spinner dolphins, humpback dolphins and killer whales were filmed for the series. The documentary is known for speculating that dolphins "deliberately get high on puffer fish toxins".

== Episode list ==
No.	Title	Directed by	Original release date	UK viewers (millions)
1	"Episode 1"	John Downer	2 January 2014	5.29
2	"Episode 2"	John Downer	9 January 2014	3.56 (overnight)

== Reception ==
=== Ratings ===
The first episode was watched by 20.4% of the viewing audience. According to overnight figures, the second episode was watched by 3.56 million viewers, with an audience share of 15.1%.

=== Critical reception ===
Ellen E. Jones of The Independent compared the second episode to "the visual equivalent of one of those "Sounds of the Ocean" CDs that insomniacs use to drift off. Nothing but calm blue seas as far as the eye can see, and the soothing Scots coo of narrator David Tennant." Benji Wilson of The Daily Telegraph also gave it four stars out of five and said his only criticism was its format being too similar to Penguins: Spy in the Huddle, a BBC series broadcast the previous year. The Guardian's Sam Wollaston called the narration "punny".

In February 2014, animal rights campaigners from Animal Defenders International accused the filmmakers of exploiting a captive dolphin at a marine park in Honduras to obtain some of the footage used in the series. The claims were rejected by the BBC and John Downer Productions, as the dolphin used was a tame individual free to move in the open ocean and the marine park.

== Home media ==
The series was released on DVD on 10 February 2014 and on Blu-ray on 17 February 2014.

== See also ==
- BBC Wildlife Specials
