= Chloe Lowery =

American singer

Chloe
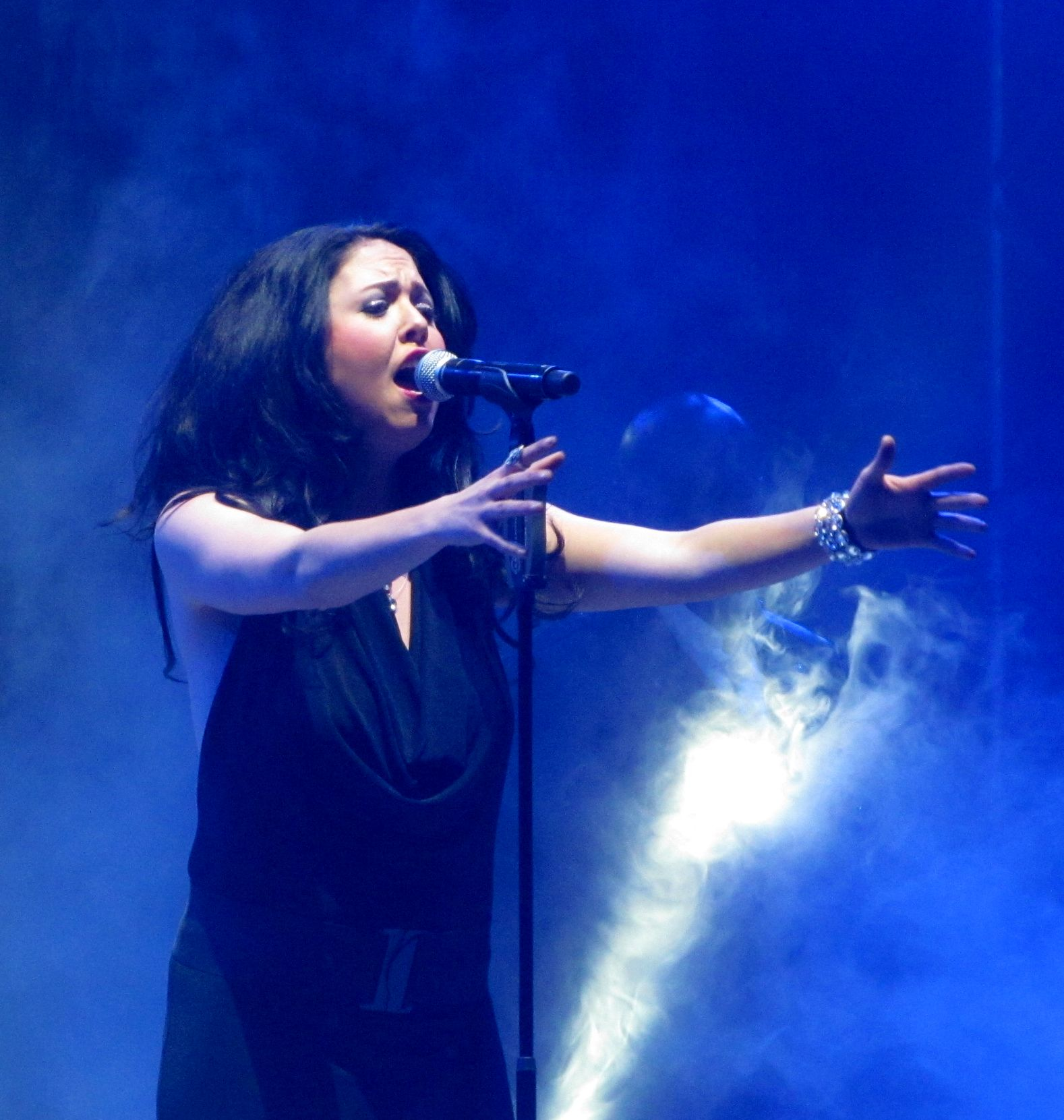
- Chloe performing in 2011

Background information
- Born: Chloe Elaine Lowery
- Genres: Progressive rock, neoclassical metal, symphonic rock, symphonic metal, pop
- Occupations: Singer, songwriter
- Years active: 1999–present
- Labels: CBL Studios, RCA, Disney Pearl
- Website: chloelowery.com

Chloe Elaine Lowery is an American singer and songwriter. By the age of 12 she was signed to RCA Records. She was featured on two film soundtracks during that time, Boys and Girls and "Joe Somebody."

She toured with Big Brother and the Holding Company. Chloe simultaneously worked with producer Ric Wake that led to her collaboration with Yanni. Chloe lent her vocals and songwriting talents to the 2009 Yanni Voices Project produced by Disney Pearl Imprint. She was featured on PBS as a featured artist in "Yanni Voices Live from Acapulco." After US and Mexico tours with Yanni, she was signed to Disney/Hollywood Records as a solo artist. Chloe has since been featured on Yanni's 2013, 2014, and 2016 releases: Truth of Touch, Inspirato, and Sensuous Chill.

In early 2010, Chloe joined rock band Trans-Siberian Orchestra, performing as Theresa on their Beethoven's Last Night Tours. Chloe joined their annual winter tour in 2011. Chloe continues to work with TSO on stage and in the studio.

Chloe has since made her Broadway debut with ROCKTOPIA as well as starred in another PBS special. She has toured with Chris Botti, performed with symphonies, the New York City Ballet as a featured vocalist, and contributed her songwriting for Everclear.

Chloe's debut album The in Between was released on April 19, 2019.
