= Weird Nature =

- Genre: Nature documentary
- Directed by: John Downer, James Honeyborne, Mark Brownlow
- Narrated by: Ciarán McMenamin
- Composer: Elizabeth Parker
- Country of origin: United Kingdom
- Original language: English
- No. of seasons: 1
- No. of episodes: 6

Production
- Executive producer: Keith Scholey
- Producer: John Downer
- Camera setup: Rod Clarke, Steve Downer, Tim Macmillan, Peter Nearhos
- Running time: 30 minutes
- Production company: John Downer Productions

Original release
- Network: BBC, Discovery Channel
- Release: 21 March – 25 April 2002

Weird Nature is a 2002 British documentary television series produced by John Downer Productions for the BBC and Discovery Channel. The series features strange behavior in nature—specifically, the animal world. The series now airs on TLC (TV network) the Science Channel and Animal Planet. The series took three years to make and a new filming technique was used to show animal movements in 3D.

Each episode, however, tended to end with a piece about how humans are probably the oddest species of all. For example, in the end of the episode about locomotion, the narrator states how unusual it is for a mammal to be bipedal. In the episode about defences, the narrator explains that humans have no real natural defences, save for their big brains.

== Episodes ==
=== Series 1 (2002) ===
No.	Title	Original release date	Prod. code
1	"Marvellous Motion"	21 March 2002	101
"The first programme in a series looking at strange animal behaviour reveals nature's quirkiest movers and shakers. From dancing sea slugs to cartwheeling caterpillars, this is nature at its most weird and wonderful. In a series of magical sequences, crocodiles gallop, salamanders transform into wheels and bushbabies bounce like rubber balls. Lizards and frogs stage an extraordinary air show, the Mexican jumping bean reveals its fidgety secrets, lemurs pogo, and two-legged lizards hunt like dinosaurs. Using new filming techniques and some extraordinary special effects, this is nature as never seen before." "Explore the wild ways animals move with a look at the mechanics of motion. Then delve into the interesting feeding habits of the natural world, including the chameleon, whose tongue is longer than its body."
2	"Bizarre Breeding"	28 March 2002	102
Animal breeding, "Discover dancing scorpions, courting birds that give trinkets as gifts, mice that mate themselves to death and a mantis that eats its partner. This exploration of strange behaviour reveals nature's bizarre breeding rituals. Meet frogs that rear their young under their skin, fish that leap from the water to lay eggs on leaves and a bullfrog father that becomes lifeguard to his offspring. There are fish that change sex, others that bubble-wrap their young, male hamsters that act as midwives, and even a male that becomes pregnant. And, in this weird world, there is even a shrew that creates a living daisy chain of its own young."
3	"Fantastic Feeding"	4 April 2002	103
Animal feeding behavior, "Discover a creature that employs glue-guns as weapons, a fish that slashes with a chainsaw and a spider that lassos its prey with a swinging blob of glue. This exploration of strange animal behaviour reveals the many inventive ways animals catch prey. Meet a fish that targets its prey using its mouth as a water-pistol, a shrimp that stuns its prey with sound and a lemur with an ET-like finger that taps for a meal. There is also a frogfish whose mouth moves faster than its prey can see, a snake with a tail that acts as a maggot-like lure, and an eagle that has found a novel way to break into its meal. There is even a mantis shrimp with a knockout punch that reaches the speed of a bullet, and a stoat that uses hypnosis."
4	"Devious Defences"	11 April 2002	104
"Discover skunks that handstand, crabs that dress up, and fish that are slime monsters. This exploration of strange animal behaviour reveals the bizarre ways animals defend themselves. Meet an armadillo that can roll into an impregnable ball, owls and frogs that puff themselves up, and a cobra that spits venom. There are fish that can imitate a chess board, octopuses that shape-shift, and creatures that can turn inside out. There are even birds that use projectile vomit or repulsive missiles and creatures that turn playing dead into a performance to die for. Using new filming techniques and some extraordinary special effects, this is nature as never seen before." "From camouflage to protective armour, animals use a clever variety of defense mechanisms to fool predators and protect themselves. From sex-changing fish to hermaphrodite snails, breeding methods in the animal world can be just as bizarre."
5	"Puzzling Partners"	18 April 2002	105
"Symbiotic relationships exist between very different animals. Find out how unlikely relationships can be beneficial to both animals. Then, discover how the animal kingdom handles the effects of drugs and alcohol among its inhabitants."
6	"Peculiar Potions"	25 April 2002	106
Animals and drugs. Cats on catnip, birds and aromatic herbs, apes and self medication, rooks, ants and smoke.
