= BBC Wildlife Specials =

- David Attenborough in the opening sequence of Lions: Spy in the Den
- Genre: Nature documentary
- Presented by: David Attenborough
- Narrated by: David Attenborough; David Tennant
- Composer: Various
- Country of origin: United Kingdom
- Original language: English
- No. of episodes: 29 (22 specials)

Production
- Producers: Neil Nightingale; Keith Scholey; John Downer
- Running time: 50 or 60 minutes
- Production companies: BBC Natural History Unit; John Downer Prods.

Original release
- Network: BBC One
- Release: 14 April 1995 – present

The BBC Wildlife Specials are a series of nature documentary programmes commissioned by BBC Television. The series premiered in 1995, and 22 specials have been produced to date, with most of the more recent ones consisting of multiple episodes. The earlier programmes were produced in-house by the BBC's Natural History Unit, but the more recent Spy in the ... titles were made by the independent John Downer Productions. The first 18 specials, through 2008, were narrated by David Attenborough. Polar Bear: Spy on the Ice (2010), Penguins: Spy in the Huddle (2013) and Dolphins: Spy in the Pod (2014) were narrated by David Tennant.

The world's leading natural history filmmakers meet the world's most charismatic animals.

— BBC tagline

== Broadcast and production history ==
The Wildlife Specials have always been broadcast on BBC One. Following the pilot Great White Shark: The True Story of Jaws, transmitted in 1995, a sequence of six further programmes were broadcast in 1997, as part of the Natural History Unit's 40th anniversary celebrations. Later specials were screened on an intermittent basis, typically at holiday times to attract a family audience. Viewing figures for the 1997 programmes peaked at 9.5 million, for Polar Bear: The Arctic Warrior.

Although the animals featured in the specials are frequent documentary subjects, the Wildlife Specials incorporate the latest filming techniques and scientific research to present the creatures in a new light, as described in the examples below:

- During the production of Polar Bear: The Arctic Warrior, the producer and cameraman were trapped on an ice floe for 20 hours, but managed to capture the first scenes of newborn cubs in the den.
- In Leopard: The Agent of Darkness, infrared cameras are used to reveal the cats' previously unseen nocturnal hunting of baboons.
- Eagle: The Master of the Skies uses aerial photography to capture dramatic scenes of the birds, including footage of them dropping tortoises from a great height to smash their shells open. Fifteen of the world's sixty species of eagle were filmed for this programme.
- A specially constructed, remote-controlled airship was used to capture aerial footage of humpback whales as they breached, scooping thousands of fish into their mouths, for Humpback Whale: The Giant of the Oceans.
- Lions: Spy in the Den was the first special to be commissioned from an independent production company. The filmmakers at John Downer Productions used their previous experience on ground-breaking films such as In-Flight Movie to develop a range of mobile, remote-controlled cameras. The "Boulder Cam" was disguised as a rock, and enabled the capture of the first footage shot inside a pride's den. This technique was developed further for the later Spy in the ... specials about elephants and bears.
- Groundbreaking high-speed photography, x-ray imaging and miniature cameras attached to the heads of snakes captured footage of new and revealing behaviour in Serpent: Through the Eyes of the Snake.
- For the two-part special Trek: Spy on the Wildebeest, cameras disguised as tortoises and crocodiles, and an aerial camera christened "Dragonfly Cam", were developed.
- In Tiger: Spy in the Jungle, trained elephants carried and deployed the "Trunk Cam" and "Tusk Cam", whilst the "Log Cam" gathered unique footage of India's jungle wildlife.

== Programmes ==
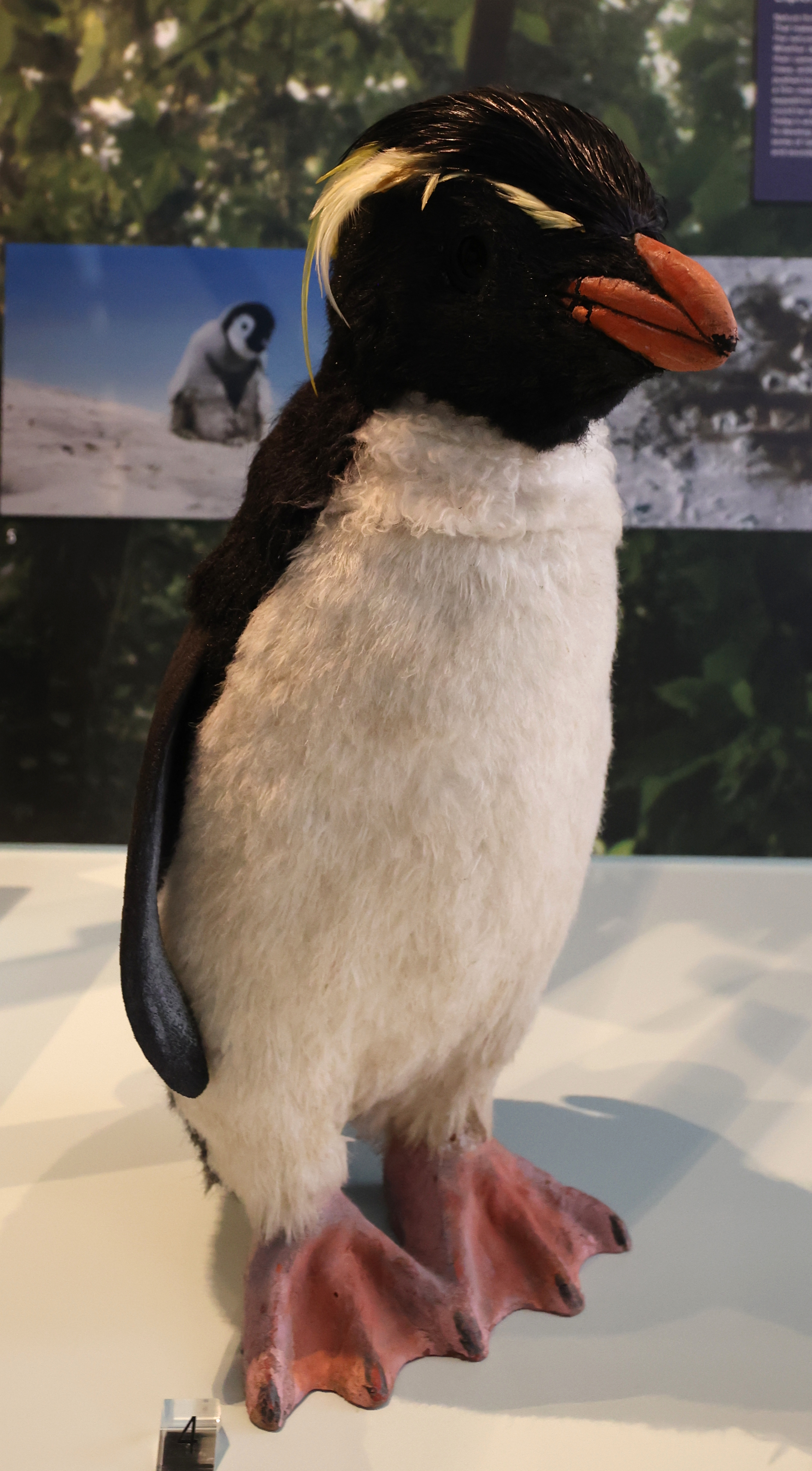
Camera used in Penguins: Spy in the Huddle

A list of programme titles with original broadcast date:

- Great White Shark: The True Story of Jaws (1995-04-14)
- Polar Bear: The Arctic Warrior (1997-11-26)
- Crocodile: The Smiling Predator (1997-12-03)
- Leopard: The Agent of Darkness (1997-12-10)
- Eagle: The Master of the Skies (1997-12-17)
- Humpback Whale: The Giant of the Oceans (1997-12-24)
- Wolf: The Legendary Outlaw (1997-12-31)
- Tiger: The Elusive Princess (1999-04-04)
- Lions: Spy in the Den (2000-12-03)
- Grizzly: Face to Face (2001-04-08)
- Gorillas: On the Trail of King Kong (2002-02-03)
- Serpent: Through the Eyes of the Snake (2002-04-10)
- Killer Whale (2003-04-09)
- Elephants: Spy in the Herd (2003-07-20)
- Smart Sharks: Swimming With Roboshark (2003-08-03)
- Bears: Spy in the Woods (2004-11-30)
- Trek: Spy on the Wildebeest

Episode 1: "The Journey" (2007-01-14)
Episode 2: "The Crossing" (2007-01-21)

- Tiger: Spy in the Jungle

Episode 1 (2008-03-30)
Episode 2 (2008-04-06)
Episode 3 (2008-04-13)

- Swarm: Nature's Incredible Invasions

Episode 1: "When Worlds Collide" (2009-01-04)
Episode 2: "One Million Heads, One Beautiful Mind" (2009-01-11)

- Polar Bear: Spy on the Ice (2010-12-29)

Episode 1
Episode 2

- Penguins: Spy in the Huddle

Episode 1: "The Journey" (2013-02-11)
Episode 2: "First Steps" (2013-02-18)
Episode 3: "Growing Up" (2013-02-25)

- Dolphins - Spy in the Pod

Episode 1 (2014-01-02)
Episode 2 (2014-01-09)

- Polar Bear, Penguin, Otter, Wallaby, Wombat, Kea: Spy in the Snow (2018-12-30)

== Awards ==
- Leopard won the Award for Innovation at the 1998 Jackson Hole Wildlife Film Festival
- Polar Bear won the Best Factual Photography award at the 1998 BAFTAs
- Tiger: The Elusive Princess won the Best Factual Photography award at the 2000 BAFTAs
- A scene of a python swallowing an antelope whole, from Serpent, won Best Factual Moment at the BBC's 2002 TV Moments awards show

== Merchandise ==
To accompany the transmission of the 1997 specials, the hardcover book The BBC Natural History Unit's Wildlife Specials (ISBN 1-900-72416-2) was published by Trident Press on 10 November 1997. It includes a foreword by David Attenborough, an introduction by series producer Keith Scholey, and six chapters about the animals featured in those specials, each written by the producer of the programme about that particular animal.

On 23 May 2004, four of the early specials, Leopard, Eagle, Tiger: The Elusive Princess, and Serpent, were released on DVD, both individually and as a box set. The first eight specials were released previously on VHS.

Other specials were released on DVD later. Lions, Elephants, and Bears were collectively released as The Spy in the ... Collection on 2 October 2006. Trek and Tiger: Spy in the Jungle were each released separately on 9 June 2008.
