= Sarah Class =

British musician

Sarah Class is an English composer, singer and songwriter.

== Biography ==
Sarah Class was born in Watford. Having written music and poetry from an early age and performing as a vocalist and pianist in bands since she was a teenager, Class found her inspiration in the lush woodlands, rolling hills and seascapes of the Isle of Wight.

Class graduated with a BA (Hons) in music and art from Chichester University, Sussex, England, and immediately thereafter, began to write extensively in Europe and North America on a number of album, TV and film projects, notably the score for the independent feature The Weekend, starring Gena Rowlands and Brooke Shields. This brought Class's talent to the attention of the record producer Sir George Martin, who took her under the wing of his publishing company George Martin Music.

During this time Class established herself as a prolific contemporary composer, her works being premiered both in the UK and abroad. In 2001, Warner Classics asked Class to provide all the music for their crossover album, Aurora-Cantamus. The album enjoyed a Top 5 status in the UK for several weeks following its release, gaining a Classical BRIT Best Album nomination.

Class's achievements also include the triple platinum album Pure, for Decca artiste Hayley Westenra in 2003, produced by Giles Martin. Class wrote and produced two tracks, including "Across The Universe of Time", which was the title track on the European release. The album enjoyed a reception in Australasia, and charted at No. 1 in the UK Albums Chart over a three-month period.

In 2005, Class toured and recorded as a jazz pianist and vocalist with Helen J Hicks's band 'The Honeyriders' on their album Letting The Light In. The tour included live performances at Ronnie Scott's Jazz Club in Soho and the Cannes Film Festival. Class also took part in a European tour with BBC Radio 3's Senegalese group 'Suuf' as a keyboard player. Her work with Martin continued through her ongoing collaboration with Eimear Quinn, winner of 1996 Eurovision Song Contest for Ireland. This project combines Quinn's ethereal vocals with Class's filmscape arrangements. One of the songs, "Another Day" was featured on Quinn's 2006 release, Gatherings.

Class released of her debut solo EP "A New Dawn", through Glorious Technicolour Records.

Sarah was commissioned to compose the score for a Finnish feature film ‘Mystery of the Wolf.’ This was followed by the BBC/Harvey Weinstein Production of ‘The Meerkats’ in 2008. This movie won ‘Best Score’ at the 2009 Jackson Hole Wildlife Film Festival. Her compositions for the BBC Series ‘Madagascar’ also received an Emmy Nomination for ‘Outstanding Contribution to Music & Sound’.

In 2012 the BBC/Discovery commissioned Class to compose and produce the music for the 6 x 1 hour series titled ‘Africa’ Africa (TV Series) narrated by Sir David Attenborough. This series went to air in the UK in January 2013. This epic series has sold to in excess of 150 countries including the USA, with transmission dates across the world.

Class' debut album Unity was released in 2015, working with 8 times Grammy award winner, American Producer Jay Newland (Norah Jones, Gregory Porter).

In 2016 she wrote the music to the Warner Brothers /Terramater Feature, Brothers of the Wind and also UK Director Peter Nicholson's debut feature Dartmoor Killings which won Best Thriller in the 2016 National Film Awards UK.

In 2017, she released the singles "Only Love is Real" and "I Will Fight"; the videoclip for the latter was produced for the World Land Trust for charity purposes and features Sir David Attenborough.

Class released the EP "Green Man" and the album Natural High in 2020.

In February 2021 Class was asked by Charles, Prince of Wales to write music for his Terra Carta Project and Sustainable Market's Initiative.

At the end of 2021 Class released two singles from her forthcoming predominately Classical album Resonate. Recorded with the Orchestra for the Earth conducted by John Warner at Sir George Martin's Air Lyndhurst Studios in Hampstead, Resonate the single, was specially written for the World Land Trust becoming the soundtrack to their latest campaign in Guatemala. Rhythm of the Earth is a special commission from H.M King Charles III, to highlight the message & ethos of his Terra Carta project at the 2021 COP26 Climate conference in Glasgow. The piece was premiered at the Kelvingrove Art Gallery and Museum at the Terra Carta Seal Awards during the Glasgow conference.

Resonate was released on February 4, 2022.

In 2023, Class was one of twelve composers asked to write a new piece for the coronation of Charles III and Camilla. Her work, Sacred Fire, was performed by the South African soprano Pretty Yende before the ceremony began.

== TV ==
Class's TV credits include numerous projects for the BBC, LWT, Channel 4, Disney, and The Discovery Channel. Her relationship with the BBC is long-standing. She has written scores for some of their natural history films, amongst them Deep Trouble, the sequel to The Blue Planet, Millennium specialThe Greatest Show on Earthand the soundtrack for the flagship David Attenborough series, The State of the Planet in 2000. The score also featured Mark Knopfler of Dire Straits on guitar. Her score was nominated for an EMMY Award. Her original score for another major David Attenborough project, Animal Forensics, was also nominated for a Royal Television Society Award in 2005.

A recent score was for the 2009 film The Meerkats. The soundtrack featured vocals from Class and an African choir with full orchestra. The film won the 2009 Silver Teton Award at Jackson Hole Wildlife Film Festival.

== Credits ==
=== Film score ===
"2016"

- Brothers of the Wind"

"2015"

- "Dartmoor Killing"

“2008”

- "Meerkats”

“2006”

- "Suden Arvoitus (aka Mystery of the Wolf)”

“2004”

- "L'ennemi naturel”

“2003”

- "Harry Potter (DVD Release)”

“2000”

- "The Weekend”

=== TV Score ===
"2022"

- America's National Parks (10 Part Series with co-composer Barnaby Taylor)

"2017"

- Lion Kingdom" (3 Part Series)

"2013"

- "Africa" (6 Part series))

"2011"

- "Madagascar" (3 Part series)

“2010”

- "Blitz Street" (4 part series)

“2009”

- "Time Team – Henry VIII's Lost Palaces”

“2008”

- "Thames Shipwrecks – A Race Against Time”

“2007”

- "Trial & Retribution”
- "Inside Extraordinary Humans: Science of Conjoined Twins”

“2006”

- “The Kindness of Strangers”
- “The Commander: Blacklight”

“2005”

- “Animal Forensics (6 part series)”

“2004”

- “World's Worst Century”
- “Children of Abraham”
- “The Black Death"

“2003”

- “The Commander”
- “Peregrine – Top Gun of the Sky”
- “Abused and Catholic”

“2002”

- “Heroes of Ground Zero”
- “The Day I Died”
- “Dogfight – Who Killed The Red Baron?”
- “Beasts on the Street”

“2001”

- “The Blue Planet – Deep Trouble (ep.9)”

“2000”

- “State of the Planet (3 part series)”
- “The Greatest Wildlife Show on Earth”
- “Wilderness Men”

“1999”

- “Grüne Inseln im steinernen Meer”
- “Equinox – Talking With Aliens”
- “Born to be Wild (with Nicholas Lyndhurst)”
- “Soca – Der smaragdene Fluß (aka Soca – The Emerald River)”
- “Consumed by Fire”

"1997"

- "The Voyage of The Mathew" (with Peter Snow)

=== Album credits ===
"2022"

- "Resonate (Album)"
- Rhythm of the Earth (Terra Carta Theme)"

"2021"

- "Resonate (Single)

"2020"

- "Natural High (Album)"
- "Natural High (Single)
- "Oceans (Where Feet May Fail)"

"2018"

- "Only Love is Real (single)"

"2017"

- "Lion Kingdom (Soundtrack)"
- "I Will Fight (single for World Land Trust)"

"2015"

- "Unity (singer/songwriter)"

“2009”

- “A New Dawn (singer/songwriter)”

“2007”

- “Hayley Westenra – Treasure (writer)”

“2006”

- “Mystery of the Wolf – Soundtrack (singer/songwriter)”
- “Eimear Quinn – Gatherings (writer)”
- “They Call Me Hansi – Across the Universe of Time (writer/producer/remix)”

“2004”

- “Hayley Westenra – Pure (Writer, Arranger)”

“2003”

- “Suuf – Debbo Hande (pianist/writer)”

“2001”

- “Cantamus – Aurora (producer/writer, arranger)”
