= Dragon's Breath Cave =

Cave in the Otjozondjupa Region of Namibia

Coordinates: 19°28′05″S 17°47′08″E

Dragon's Breath Cave is a flooded karst cave located in the Otjozondjupa Region of Namibia on private land, not accessible to the general public. The cave was discovered by Roger Ellis during a caving expedition to the area in 1986. It is named for the warm, moist air that rises from its entrance when barometric pressure drops, which condenses to form a mist suggestive of the breath of a dragon.

The cave contains the world's largest known non-subglacial underground lake, with an area of almost 2 hectares (4.9 acres). The water surface of the lake is around 60 metres (200 ft) below the land surface at the cave mouth. Its total depth is 205 metres (673 ft). Although it has been reported that the rare fish species Clarias cavernicola lives in the lake in the Dragon's Breath Cave, this is an error. It is only known from the nearby Aigamas Cave.

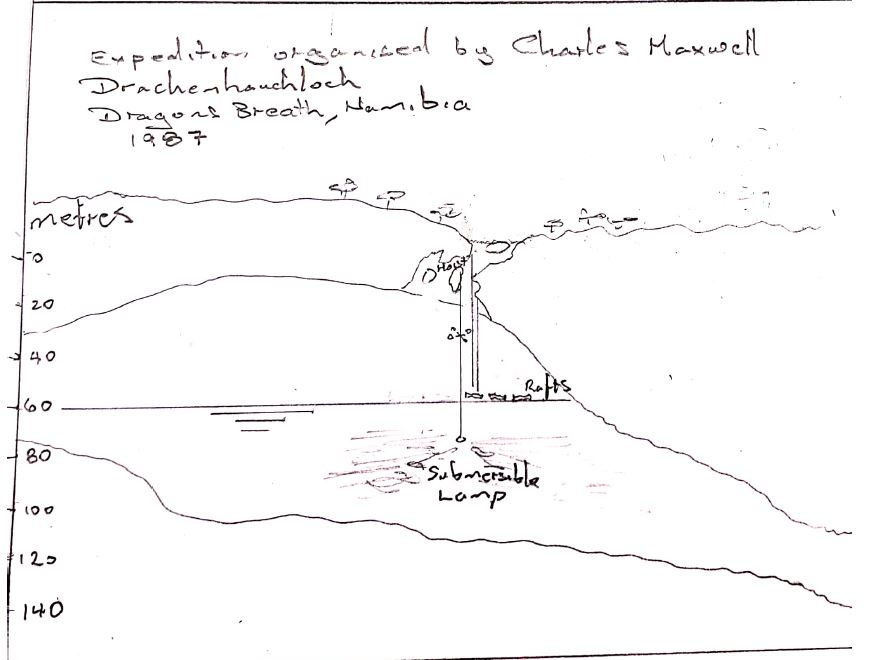
Sketch of Dragons Breath Hole 1986

Martyn Farr records in his book The Darkness Beckons the exploration of the cave by a team of divers and cavers led by Roger Ellis and Charles Maxwell of the South African Spelaeological Association a year after the cave was identified in 1986 by cavers as being of significant size.

== Extent and dimensions ==
The entrance to the cave is a near-vertical shaft in a dolomite outcropping at the foot of a low hill, and is quite narrow in places. Access is by rope to the surface of the lake. The water surface was measured at 59 metres below land surface datum at the cave mouth. The deepest point is 264 m below datum at a depth of 205 m by multibeam sonar measurement from the Sunfish underwater survey drone. The cave above the water was surveyed by laser. As of 2015, the deepest point reached by divers was 132 m. There is a small beach at the south end of the lake, quite far from the entry shaft, which is directly above the water at some distance from the shore. The cave slopes downward from the beach to the deepest point at about 40–45° at the north end of the cave. The cave is wide and fairly straight, with the lake surface being visible from a large part of the flooded volume. Water depth below the entrance is about 60 m. The tunnel tapers down from about 175 metres (575 ft) wide and almost 61 metres (200 ft) high.

== Exploration and survey dives ==
- 2019 survey expedition.
- June 2024 diving photographic expedition.

== See also ==
- Lake Guinas – Sinkhole lake in Namibia
- Harasib Cave – Flooded karst cave in Namibia
- Caves of Namibia
- Great Man-Made River – Network of pipes that supplies water to the north of Libya, a project based on another fossil water store in an arid area in Africa
