= Sensuous Chill =

Studio album by Yanni
- Released: January 29, 2016
- Recorded: Yanni's Private Studio, 2010–15
- Genres: Easy listening, new-age, electronica
- Length: 67:32
- Label: Portrait/Sony Masterworks/SME
- Producer: Yanni

Yanni chronology
Inspirato (2014)	Sensuous Chill (2016)	The Dream Concert: Live from the Great Pyramids of Egypt (2016)

Sensuous Chill is the sixteenth studio album by Greek contemporary instrumental musician Yanni, formally released on January 29, 2016.

== Production ==
On December 18, 2015, the single "Desert Soul" was released. In January 2016, Yanni explained to NPR that the album, which took five years to create, had tracks whose selection and ordering were designed to be "consistent" rather than "demanding" for the listener. In contrast to a market that is largely singles driven, Sensuous Chill was intended to be listened to in full and on repeat.

Unlike Yanni's recent albums which featured a full orchestra and acoustic instrumentation, Sensuous Chill was built around synthesizers, programmed rhythms and electronic sounds, said to "come full circle" to his early-1980s albums. Employing today's more sophisticated technologies, Yanni said that it took a 200 to 350 tracks per song. The album's third track, "Drive", is a remix of "Looking Glass" in the 1986 album Keys to Imagination.

Tracks 7, 11, and 16 feature vocals from Leslie Mills. Tracks 2, 9, 12, and 15 feature vocals from Chloe Lowery. Some songs, like "Whispers In The Dark", "Our Days", and "I'm So" are remakes of older Yanni songs.

== Track listing ==
Sensuous Chill includes the following tracks.

No.	Title	Length
1.	"Thirst for Life"	3:46
2.	"Rapture"	3:34
3.	"Drive"	3:55
4.	"What You Get"	4:34
5.	"Desert Soul"	3:35
6.	"1001"	3:53
7.	"The Keeper"	3:28
8.	"Whispers in the Dark"	3:51
9.	"Seeing You Around"	3:38
10.	"Orchid"	4:13
11.	"Our Days"	4:26
12.	"A Little Too Late"	3:54
13.	"Dance for Me"	4:33
14.	"Retreat to Dream"	3:33
15.	"Test of Time"	3:55
16.	"Can't Wait"	4:06
17.	"I'm So"	4:37

== Charts ==
Chart (2016)	Peak position
US Billboard 200	173
US Billboard New Age Albums	1

== Reception ==
AllMusic's Stephen Thomas Erlewine wrote that Sensuous Chill was neither rushed nor lazy. He thought the album's 70 minutes made the album "a little bit long" but that Yanni didn't keep its 17 tracks "treading water." Erlewine noted the album's variety, including "placid surfaces," a slight Middle Eastern flair, R&B beats, and "spectral soul vocals straight out of Pink Floyd." Erlewine added that there was a "charm to (the) traditionalism" of the album, which could have been cut in the 1990s.

The sound of the album was said to be almost entirely built around synthesizers, programmed rhythms, and electronic sounds, so as to give the album a "modern edge." Though Yanni continues to include music styles and rhythms from around the world, unlike the "epic sweep" or "placid feel" of some of Yanni's earlier work, Sensuous Chill's tracks were described as "pop-oriented" and "rhythmically assertive," with moods that are "sumptuous" and "sultry."

Yanni was said to employ "sounds and textures used in today's electronica" to give the album a modern edge, its songs being "more pop-oriented and rhythmically assertive" than his recent albums. However, Yanni's "ability to craft memorable melodies" was also said to be apparent throughout.

== See also ==
- Yanni discography
- Yanni Voices
