= Supersense =

British television documentary series

Supersense DVD cover

Supersense is a six-part nature documentary television series produced by the BBC Natural History Unit, originally broadcast in the United Kingdom on BBC1 in 1988. The series producer was John Downer and the narrator Andrew Sachs. It used groundbreaking effects and filming techniques to show how animals perceive the world around them. The same production team went on to make the follow-up series Lifesense in 1991 and Supernatural: Unseen Power of Animals in 1999.

== Episodes ==
- "Sixth Sense": Animals use senses of which humans are unaware. Sensitivity to the earth's electromagnetic fields, or to weather pressure, can be used to aid navigation. Some animals can predict earthquakes. Predators put these senses to lethal use: a shark homes in on the body electricity of its prey, vampire bats detect the infra-red radiation of blood, and a rattlesnake sees a 'heat picture' of its victim.
- "Seeing Sense": A vulture can spot a carcass from a great distance, the four-eyed fish can see above and below water simultaneously, a fly's multi-faceted eye sees a very different world than a human eye, while other insects can see into ultra-violet light. And lions have an area on the retina which actually empathises with their prey.
- "Sound Sense": Human ears have a limited range and are deaf to a low-register elephant conversation or the high-pitched squeaking of mice. Whales use sonar to communicate across hundreds of miles of sea, while spiders listen out for the wingbeats of prey and the kangaroo rat has hearing so sensitive that it can hear the rattlesnake's strike—and avoid it. Birds, meanwhile, use sounds to detect changes in the weather and as an aid to navigation.
- "Super Scents": Smell is invaluable in hunting, protecting a species, mating, and navigation. Petrels use it to find fish in the open sea, springboks emit an 'alarm' odour to warn the herd of a predator, salamanders inject their females with aphrodisiac, and a salmon's epic journey across the ocean to spawn and die is achieved through its sense of smell.
- "Sense of Timing": Courting, egg-laying, hibernation—the cycles of the earth, moon, and sun are the rhythms which govern all life. Every animal's perception of time varies, according to its heart rate. A shrew lives 30 times faster than an elephant, so time appears to pass more slowly. Also shown is the rare 17-year eruption of the US cicada.
- "Making Sense" (23 January 1989): Each animal has a unique view of the world derived from a combination of different senses. The mind creates mental maps for navigational skills, which can also be affected by genetic programming. Other super-senses have resulted from the need to hunt or avoid becoming a meal. The mind decides what skills it needs to survive.

== Media ==
- A region 2 DVD (BBCDVD1989) featuring all six 30-minute episodes was released on 21 August 2006.
- A hardcover book to accompany the series, Supersense: Perception in the Animal World by John Downer, was released by BBC Books in November 1988 (ISBN 0-563-20660-8).

== See also ==
- The Most Extreme episode 22, "Super Senses"
