= Pretty Yende =

South African soprano (born 1985)

Pretty Yende OIS
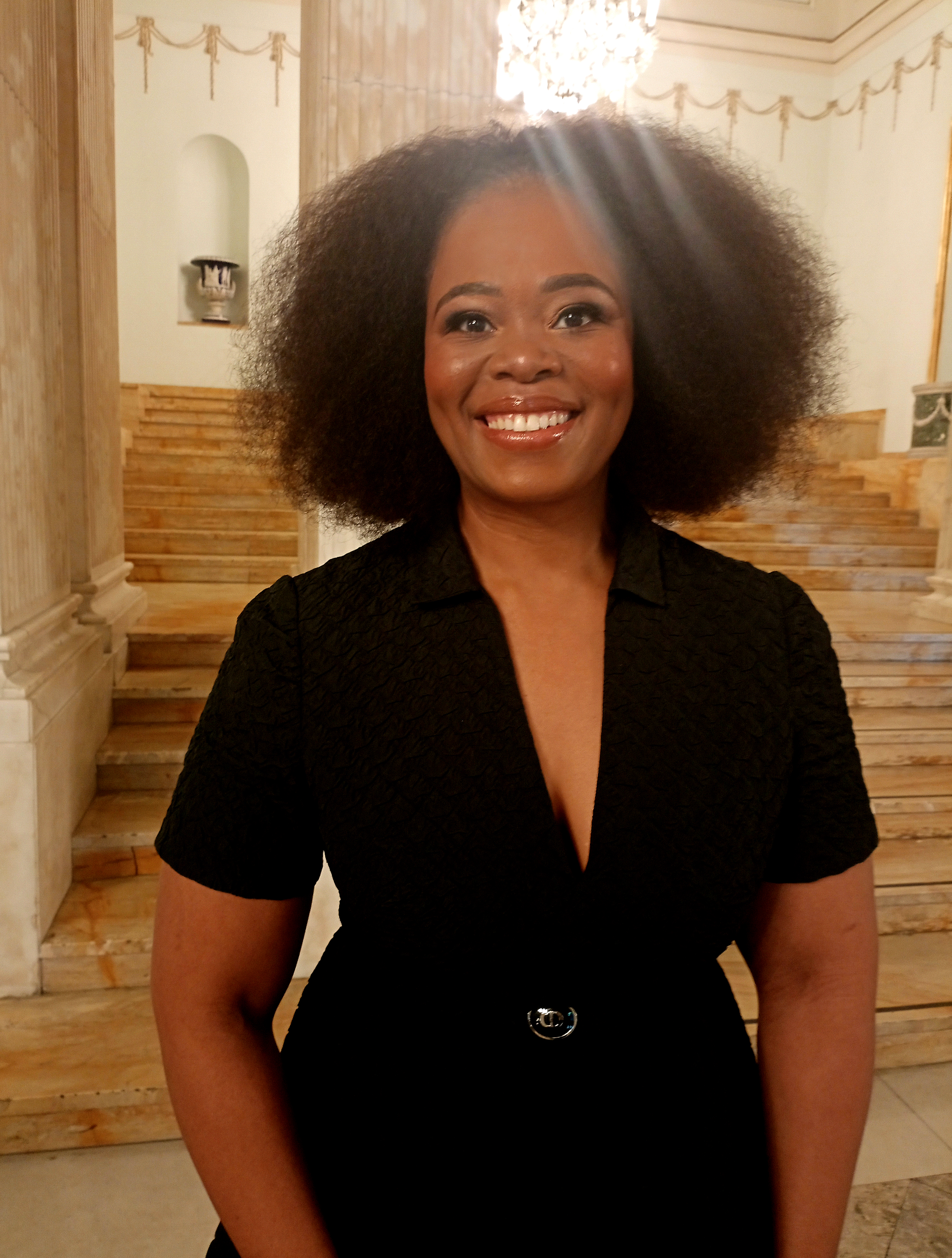
- Yende, Teatro San Carlo, 2025
- Born: 6 March 1985 (age 41); Piet Retief, Mpumalanga, South Africa
- Education: South African College of Music; Accademia Teatro alla Scala
- Occupation: Opera singer (soprano)
- Years active: 2009–present
- Relatives: Nombulelo Yende (sister)
- Website: www.prettyyende.com

Pretty Yende OIS (born 6 March 1985) is a South African operatic coloratura soprano. She has performed leading roles at opera houses internationally, including La Scala and the Metropolitan Opera. She performed at the coronation of Charles III and Camilla.

== Early life and education ==
Born in Piet Retief, Mpumalanga, she grew up with two brothers and a sister; the family, also with the grandparents, sang often. Yende was inspired to learn opera at the age of 16 after seeing a British Airways TV advertisement that featured the Flower Duet from Lakmé. She subsequently enrolled at the South African College of Music, where her teachers included Virginia Davids, and from which she graduated cum laude. She also graduated from the Accademia Teatro alla Scala in Milan, Italy. In 2007 Yende participated in Raina Kabaivanska's master classes in Sofia and after her presentation at the gala concert of Kabaivanska with the Sofia Philharmonic Orchestra conducted by Nayden Todorov, she won a scholarship from the Raina Kabaivanska Fund. Her younger sister Nombulelo also became an opera singer.

Yende won two prizes in the 2008 International Vocal Competition 's-Hertogenbosch: the Prize of the Province of North Brabant, and the Engagement Opera Riga, which gave her the opportunity to take part in the new year concert at the Latvian National Opera in December. She won first prize in operetta and opera at the International Hans Gabor Belvedere Singing Competition 2009 in Vienna. In 2010, Yende won prizes at three competitions: first prize at the Vincenzo Bellini International Competition, first prize at the International Singing Competition of Savonlinna Opera Festival (shared), and sixth prize at the Leyla Gencer Voice Competition. In 2011, she won first prize at Operalia, held that year in Moscow. Her younger sister Nombulelo won the CulturArte Prize at Operalia in 2023 in Cape Town.

== Career ==
During her time at the studio of La Scala in Milan, Yende performed roles by Rossini, Berenice in L'occasione fa il ladro in 2010 and Elvira in L'italiana in Algeri in 2011. She appeared in four roles the following season, the Priestess in Verdi's Aida, Barbarina in Mozart's Le nozze di Figaro, Norina in Donizetti's Don Pasquale and Musetta in Puccini's La bohème.

Yende appeared in the closing concert of the 2010 FIFA World Cup on 9 July 2010, two days before the final, alongside Bryan Adams and Andrea Bocelli. She was featured in Bocelli's Live in Central Park concert on 15 September 2011, which was aired on PBS's Great Performances and released as Concerto: One Night in Central Park. They united again in the concert entitled Amore e perdono held by the Fetzer Institute at the Basilica of Saint Francis of Assisi on 22 September 2012, which was aired on Rai 1 on 29 September 2012.

Yende made her Metropolitan Opera (Met) debut in New York City on 17 January 2013, in the role of Adèle in Rossini's Le comte Ory, stepping in for Nino Machaidze; she performed alongside tenor Juan Diego Florez in the title role She subsequently stepped in for Cecilia Bartoli in the same role at the Theater an der Wien in Vienna. In July 2014, she returned to La Scala for Le comte Ory, alternating as Adèle with Aleksandra Kurzak. Later that year she returned to the Met as Pamina in Mozart's Die Zauberflöte, singing between performances at the Richard Tucker Gala and at Carnegie Hall for a solo recital. In 2015 she portrayed Susanna in Mozart's Figaro at the Los Angeles Opera. In 2016 she appeared as Rosina in Rossini's Il barbiere di Siviglia and the title role of Donizetti's Lucia di Lammermoor at the Paris Opera. In 2018, she portrayed Adina in Bartlett Sher's production of Donizetti's L'elisir d'amore at the Met.

Yende is credited as a primary artist for the "Ode À L'Humanité" (Ode to Humanity, previously called Aria) track on the Yanni/Plácido Domingo collaboration Inspirato (2014).

In 2023 Yende performed at the coronation of Charles III and Camilla. She sang "Sacred Fire", a piece written by Sarah Class to a text by Grahame Davies for the coronation. In 2024 she appeared first at the Oper Frankfurt, as Cleopatra in Handel's Giulio Cesare, alongside Lawrence Zazzo in the title role.

== Incident in Paris ==
Yende accused French border police of police brutality and racial discrimination. She detailed on social media her experience of being treated like a criminal at Charles de Gaulle Airport on 21 June 2021 while arriving for her fourth La sonnambula performance at the Théâtre des Champs-Élysées. She said she was strip searched and held in a dark room with all her belongings taken. The French National Police disputed that on the grounds that she had a South African passport without a visa to enter. She did present her residence permit issued in Milan, with which she had always travelled throughout Europe, yet they said she needed a separate one-time visa, while Yende and her lawyer claimed she had all the documents required. They also denied having ordered her to undress but a pat-down by a female officer took place in accordance with standard procedure, and she left around 6 pm with a regular visa.

The South African Department of International Relations and Cooperation, aware of the incident, demanded explanation and investigation from the French authorities through the South African embassy in Paris. It also voiced their intention to démarche the French ambassador to South Africa, based in Pretoria, to convey its displeasure.

== Awards and honours ==
Yende was awarded Siola d'oro in 2011. She won an Arca d'oro Italia Young Talents Award in 2012, and performed a recital in Turin on 30 March 2013 owing to the award.

She was conferred the Silver Order of Ikhamanga on 27 April 2013. In a statement by the chairperson of the National Orders Advisory Council, Dr. Cassius Lubisi, Yende was conferred the honour "for her excellent achievement and international acclaim in the field of world opera and serving as a role model to aspiring young musicians."

She was one of the winners of the 2013 Women of the Year Awards by Glamour South Africa. In September 2013, she received an Mbokodo Award in the category of opera.

Yende won the Best Recording Solo Recital Award for her album A Journey in the 2017 International Opera Awards, and was awarded the International Achiever Award in the 23rd South African Music Awards. She won a Readers' Award in the 2018 International Opera Awards, and the Cologne Opera Award (Kölner Opernpreis), received during the city's Floraball. In 2019, she was invested a Knight of the Order of the Star of Italy.

== Discography ==
Yende signed a long-term recording contract with Sony Classical in October 2015. Her first recording under this Sony contract was "A Journey".

- 2016: A Journey; Marco Armiliato conducting RAI National Symphony Orchestra (Sony)
- 2017: Dreams; Giacomo Sagripanti conducting Orchestra Sinfonica di Milano Giuseppe Verdi (Sony)

== Opera roles ==
- Berenice, L'occasione fa il ladro (Rossini)
- Elvira, L'italiana in Algeri (Rossini)
- Priestess, Aida (Verdi)
- Barbarina, The Marriage of Figaro (Mozart)
- Norina, Don Pasquale (Donizetti)
- Musetta, La bohème (Puccini)
- Comtesse Adèle, Le comte Ory (Rossini)
- Lucia, Lucia di Lammermoor (Donizetti)
- Micaëla, Carmen (Bizet)
- Juliette, Roméo et Juliette (Gounod)
- Fiorilla, Il turco in Italia (Rossini)
- Pamina, The Magic Flute (Mozart)
- Rosina, The Barber of Seville (Rossini)
- Susanna, The Marriage of Figaro (Mozart)
- Adina, L'elisir d'amore (Donizetti)
- Elvira, I puritani (Bellini)
- Amira, Ciro in Babilonia (Rossini)
- Marie, La fille du régiment (Donizetti)
- Zoraide, Ricciardo e Zoraide (Rossini)
- Leïla, Les pêcheurs de perles (Bizet)
- Amina, La sonnambula (Bellini)
- Violetta, La traviata (Verdi)
- Manon, Manon (Massenet)
- Stella\Olympia\Antonia\Giulietta, The Tales of Hoffmann (Offenbach)
- Semele, "Semele (Handel)" (Handel)
