= Lifesense =

- Also known as: Lifesense: Our Lives Through Animal Eyes
- Genre: Nature documentary
- Directed by: John Downer
- Narrated by: Andrew Sachs
- Country of origin: United Kingdom
- Original language: English
- No. of series: 1
- No. of episodes: 6

Production
- Producer: John Downer
- Running time: 30 minutes
- Production companies: BBC Bristol; Lionheart Television International; BBC Studios Natural History Unit

Original release
- Network: BBC1
- Release: 11 November – 16 December 1991

Related
- Supersense; Supernatural: The Unseen Powers of Animals

Lifesense is a six-part nature documentary television series produced by the BBC Studios Natural History Unit, originally broadcast in the United Kingdom on BBC1 in 1991. The series producer was John Downer and the narrator Andrew Sachs. It used groundbreaking effects and filming techniques to show how animals perceive the wildlife, pioneering techniques reveal our lives from the animal's point of view and creatures across the landscapes from the world around them. The same production team had made the series' predecessor Supersense in 1988 and would go on to make the follow-up series Supernatural: The Unseen Powers of Animals in 1999.

== Episodes ==
1. "Home Life" (11 November 1991)
2. "Seed of Life" (18 November 1991)
3. "Partners for Life" (25 November 1991)
4. "Life and Soul" (2 December 1991)
5. "Human Life" (9 December 1991)
6. "Life in the Balance" (16 December 1991)

== Media ==
A VHS release of Lifesense featuring all six 30-minute episodes was released on 19 September 1995.

A hardcover book to accompany the series, Lifesense: Our Lives Through Animal Eyes by John Downer, was released by BBC Books in November 1991 (ISBN 0-563-36115-8).
