= John Downer (filmmaker) =

British film producer (born 1952)

- Born: John Leslie Keith Downer; 1952 (age 72–73); London, England

John Downer (born 1952) is a British film producer of nature documentaries for television and cinema. He is best known for his contributions to the nature documentary series BBC Wildlife Specials.

== Education and career ==
Downer was born in 1952 in London. He studied zoology at Swansea University. He started his professional life in 1981 at the BBC Natural History Unit, later creating his own production company John Downer Productions headquartered in Bristol. Downer pioneered a number of techniques for wildlife filmmaking, in particular by putting cameras on birds, and by filming birds from the air using various airborne filming platforms.

== Film and television credits ==
- 1988: Supersense, six-part series
- 1991: Lifesense, six-part series
- 1992: Digging in the Dirt, music video for Peter Gabriel, awarded a Grammy
- 1999: Supernatural: The Unseen Powers of Animals, six-part series
- 2000: Lions - Spy in the Den, part of BBC Wildlife Specials
- 2002: Weird Nature, six-part series
- 2003: Elephants - Spy in the Herd, part of BBC Wildlife Specials
- 2004: Bears - Spy in the Woods, part of BBC Wildlife Specials
- 2004: Pride, feature-length documentary
- 2007: Trek - Spy on the Wildebeest, two-part series, part of BBC Wildlife Specials
- 2008: Tiger - Spy in the Jungle, three-part series, part of BBC Wildlife Specials
- 2009: Swarm, two-part series
- 2010: Polar Bear - Spy on the Ice, two-part series, part of BBC Wildlife Specials
- 2010: Psyche, music video for Massive Attack
- 2011: Earthflight, six-part series
- 2013: Penguins - Spy in the Huddle, three-part series, part of BBC Wildlife Specials
- 2014: Dolphins - Spy in the Pod, two-part series, part of BBC Wildlife Specials
- 2017: Spy in the Wild
- 2018: Spy in the Snow
- 2019: Serengeti, six-part series
- 2023: Spy in the Ocean

== Read also ==
- Downer, John (1989) Supersense – Perception in the Animal World. Henry Holt, New York
