= Leopard Cave, Namibia =

Archaeological site in Namibia

Leopard Cave
- location in Namibia
- 21°34′22″S 15°33′18″E
- Periods: Later Stone Age
- Location: Omaruru
- Region: Erongo Region of Namibia

Leopard Cave is an archaeological rock shelter site located in the Erongo region of Namibia. Described as a Later Stone Age site, Leopard Cave has a large and varied archaeological record. Evidence for extensive ochre processing has been found at the site, as well as a few examples of rock art. There is also evidence for a few different forms of stone tool creation, as well as a robust record of bone ornaments. Leopard Cave presents a large assemblage of animal remains, of which interpretations have changed as more advanced research has been conducted. From its discovery in 2006, Leopard Cave has been subject to many different varieties of archaeological research, and has added to understanding of Later Stone Age peoples in Southern Africa.

== Geography, environment, and geology ==
=== Geography ===
Leopard Cave is a Later Stone Age (LSA) archaeological site located in the Erongo Region of modern-day Namibia. The site lies on the farm of Omandumba West, in the vicinity of the northern Erongo Mountains, and sits at an altitude of 1256 meters. Leopard Cave is at times associated with the Fackelträger site, which lies about 1.7 kilometers north of it.

=== Environment ===
At the time that Leopard Cave was occupied, the environment and climate of Southern Africa showed significant fluctuation, beginning as a relatively dry grassland environment, and transitioning over time to a slightly more humid woodland savannah environment. In relation to the change in climate and biome, it can be assumed that some changes occurred in the predominant fauna at the time as well.

=== Geology and stratigraphic profile ===
Leopard Cave is a rock shelter of about 60 square meters, formed in a chunk of Cretaceous granite oriented towards the Erongo mountains in the south. The area in general is host to many Jurassic and Cretaceous geologic formations, mostly located in the volcanic Erongo mountain range.

Leopard Cave is divided into three main stratigraphic groups, with the first (and shallowest) containing ash and other extensive evidence of human occupation, and the other two containing evidence of the cave's collapse and sediment with some evidence of earlier human occupation, respectively.

== Archaeology ==
=== Archaeological investigations ===
Since its discovery during a 2006 survey, undertaken cooperatively by French and Namibian agencies, Leopard Cave has undergone several field seasons, with excavations at the site occurring from 2007-2009, 2011-2012, and 2014-2018. These excavations uncovered a stratigraphic sequence almost 2 meters deep, which yielded extensive evidence of human occupation. The archaeological record at Leopard Cave is diverse, and investigations have focused on stone tools, rock art and associated pigments, botanical remains, and faunal and human remains.

=== Archaeological findings ===
==== Chronology and dating ====
A chronology of human occupation at Leopard Cave has been established based on radiocarbon dates extracted from several charcoal samples. These analyses outline three distinct occupations of the site, dating to "between 5,700 and 3,200...around 2,300-2,500...and after 2,100" BP (Before Present).

==== Faunal remains ====
Leopard Cave boasts an extensive faunal record, with more than 6500 animal bones in total uncovered at the site, with more than half of the assemblage made up of ostrich eggshells. Medium-sized bovids, both wild and domestic, also make up a significant portion of the faunal assemblage. Despite the high density of faunal remains, fragmentation and poor conservation has made it difficult for archaeologists to make taxonomic identifications or draw conclusions about how fauna was exploited at Leopard Cave. Despite these difficulties, general conclusions have been drawn that the faunal assemblage results from intentional consumption of the animals represented at the site.

The bovid bones discovered at Leopard Cave have been subject to extensive debate regarding their taxa and whether or not they were domesticated. Since the environment around Leopard Cave is and was populated by several wild bovid species (klipspringer, impala, etc.), it can be difficult for archaeologists to distinguish between wild species and domestic ones, such as caprines (sheep and goats). However, archaeologists did find two molars that they identified as caprines, which were originally radiocarbon dated to around 2000 BP. For a while, these teeth were considered to be the oldest evidence of caprine domestication in southern Africa, and were looked at as possible evidence of early migration of pastoralist (herding) peoples into the area. However, later archaeologists performed ancient protein analyses of the teeth and found that they belonged to local wild bovids rather than domesticated caprines. Caprine remains, specifically remains of domestic sheep, were eventually discovered at Leopard Cave, but they dated to 919-743 BP, much later than the previous assumption. Because of this discovery, Leopard Cave is no longer considered evidence for the earliest migration of pastoralists to southern Africa.

==== Ochre and rock art ====
Ochre refers to "ferruginous rocks and iron oxides with a high tinting strength", and it makes up a significant portion of the archaeological record at Leopard Cave. There is extensive evidence of ochre processing at Leopard Cave. The assemblage contains 366 total pieces of red (ferruginous rock) or black (iron oxide) ochre, as well as 15 stone tools associated with ochre processing, and numerous artifacts that have been touched by ochre in some way.

Human activity is evident throughout the ochre fragments, with evidence of either fragmentation or grinding apparent in a significant portion of the specimens. Aside from the pieces themselves, Leopard Cave is also host to several granite and basalt grinding slabs and handstones. All of these tools have some amount of the red tint characteristic of ochre present on their surfaces or edges, and the handstones especially show this residue within wear marks. The presence of this tint on the stone tools indicates that residents of Leopard Cave used them to process ochre, turning it from a rock to a powdered pigment. The same red color is present on some several ostrich eggshell beads and a small number of bone ornaments. While the presence of these pigments could be decorative, it could also have resulted incidentally from the use of ochre fragments as tools.

Ochre pigment was also used in the production of rock art in Leopard Cave, some of which survives to this day. Both anthropomorphic and zoomorphic figures were found painted on the walls of the cave, in a location that would have sat at eye level for past humans. All the figures present in Leopard Cave are fine-line and red monochrome.

Radiocarbon dates and stratigraphic analysis suggests that ochre processing occurred at Leopard Cave from 3,500 to 2,000 BP.

==== Lithics and other artifacts ====
Over 1,000 stone tools (lithic technology) were found at Leopard Cave. Of these tools, the grand majority are made from quartz and basalt, which are both local to the Erongo Mountain region. There are a few tools made of chert, which is not local, but the scarcity of these artifacts makes it difficult to draw significant conclusions from their presence. Many of the tools seem to have been damaged by fire, associated with hearths found within the stratigraphic layers. The presence of numerous stone flakes at Leopard Cave indicates that tool creation occurred on-site, and multiple knapping techniques were identified. One significant characteristic of the lithic record at Leopard Cave is the existence of a group of macrotools referred to as "scraper planes. Scraper planes are tools consisting of a cutting edge and a flat surface. They are used as woodworking tools in some contexts, but could be applied to a number of activities; currently, there is no definite consensus on what they were used for at Leopard Cave.

Aside from lithics, there were also several bone tool artifacts recovered at Leopard Cave, consisting of several bone points and linkshafts, as well as some pieces of polished bone. There is also a significant record of ornamentation at Leopard Cave. The majority of this record consists of beads made of ostrich eggshell. Three types of bead manufacture have been identified, each involving varying amounts of drilling and polishing.

There is a limited record of pottery present at Leopard Cave. Five sherds were found at the site, all of which lacked decoration and other diagnostic criteria. Research has yet to be conducted on Leopard Cave pottery.

==== Botanical remains ====
Samples of soil, charcoal, and seeds were taken from Leopard Cave. From the charcoal samples that were analyzed, it appears that the main wood used in Leopard Cave hearths was from Senegalia trees, with wood from a few other local species also present. The seed record consists mainly of different species of local grasses, all of which are inedible. Despite the fact that these grasses are not edible, their presence at the site is still notable.

==== Human remains ====
Very few human remains have been discovered at Leopard Cave, with the record restricted to a single deciduous tooth, most likely lost by an individual on the site, and a single zygomatic bone.
