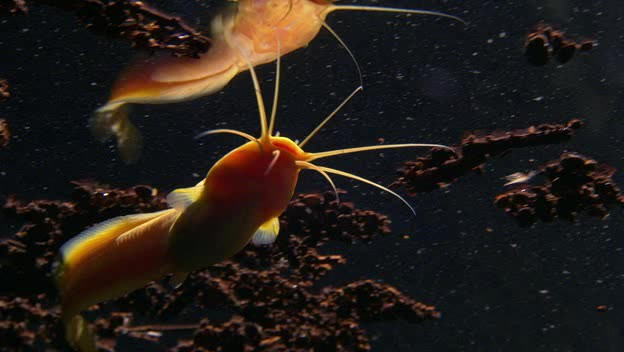
- A cave catfish underwater in a dark environment

Conservation status
- Critically Endangered (IUCN 3.1)

Scientific classification
- Kingdom: Animalia
- Phylum: Chordata
- Class: Actinopterygii
- Order: Siluriformes
- Family: Clariidae
- Genus: Clarias
- Species: C. cavernicola

Binomial name
- Clarias cavernicola Trewavas, 1936

= Clarias cavernicola =

Species of air-breathing catfish

Clarias cavernicola, the cave catfish, is a critically endangered species of airbreathing catfish. This cavefish is only known to live in the Aigamas cave, Otjozondjupa region, Namibia. The golden cave catfish lack pigmentation and are up to 16.1 cm (6.3 in) in standard length. They have very small eyes that are covered with skin, and are probably effectively blind. They feed on detritus and invertebrates that fall into the lake in which they live. The population is estimated at 200–400 individuals. Little is known about its reproduction, and attempts to breed it in captivity have failed. The population is threatened by chance events and water extraction from the cave lake, which has resulted in a drop of the water level.

It is the only known cavefish in mainland Southern Africa.

== See also ==
- Caves of Namibia
