= Brennan Gilmore =

American bandleader, musician, diplomat, and political activist (born 1979)

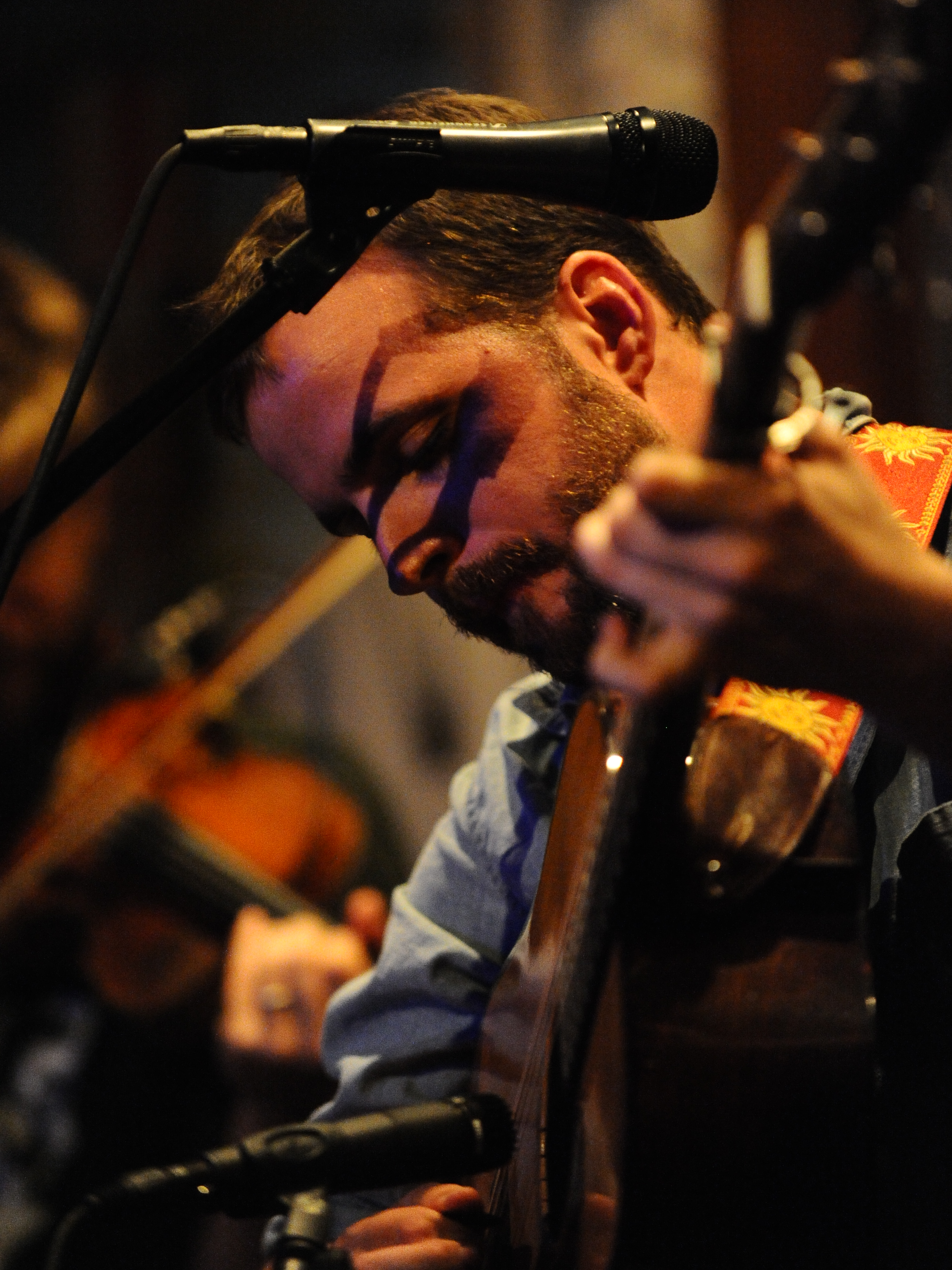
- Gilmore performs at Solly's Tavern in Washington, D.C. June 25, 2010

United States Foreign Service Officer
- In office 2002–2016
- President: George W. Bush; Barack Obama

Personal details
- Born: Brennan Michael Gilmore; 1979 (age 46–47)
- Citizenship: United States
- Party: Democratic
- Education: University of Virginia
- Known for: Clean Virginia executive director
- Awards: Secretary of State's Award for Public Outreach 2006
- Website: cleanvirginia.org

Brennan Michael Gilmore (born 1979) is an American musician and former United States Foreign Service Officer. As a musician and bandleader he has originated and performed in a number of musical groups. He was raised in Lexington, Virginia and attended the University of Virginia, where he studied international relations as an Echols Scholar, graduating in 2001. He currently resides near Charlottesville, Virginia.

Gilmore served as chief of staff for Tom Perriello's gubernatorial campaign in Virginia. He currently serves as senior director for Clean Virginia, and works in rural workforce development, bringing IT opportunities to "underserved communities" in rural Virginia. He teaches as adjunct faculty at James Madison University in Harrisonburg, Virginia.

Gilmore was present for a protest rally in Charlottesville on August 12, 2017, that turned violent. His film of a car ramming participants led to accusations and threats, damages for some of which he is now suing in court.

Gilmore serves as executive director of Clean Virginia, an advocacy group established to counter the political influence of Dominion Energy.

== Diplomatic career ==
Gilmore joined the United States Foreign Service in 2002, shortly after finishing college, serving 15 years in several African countries, including Tunisia. He also served at postings in Democratic Republic of the Congo, Central African Republic, Sudan, and Sierra Leone—and domestically from the State Department in Washington, D.C. He was Deputy Chief of Mission in Central African Republic. His service in Africa was curtailed by a closing of the U.S. diplomatic mission in Bangui in 2012 due to security concerns. Gilmore served as Russ Feingold and Tom Perriello's top aide in their postings as U.S. Special Envoy to the African Great Lakes Region. He is currently on long-term unpaid leave from the Department of State.

== Political activism ==
Brennan Gilmore's grandfather, John Middlemas, a 97-year-old World War II veteran, "took a knee" in support of NFL players protesting the national anthem, saying, "Those kids have every right to protest." Gilmore "knew it was a powerful image" of his relative kneeling, and posted it to his Twitter account. His grandfather's activism was inspired by his own New Zealand relative, a British settler "who spoke out against 'mean and nasty' treatment of the Maori 150 years ago." Gilmore's aunt Maile Auterson, who heads a community gardens organization in Missouri and descends from a long line of Ozarks farmers, claims "they are a family of Democrats".

Gilmore served as chief of staff for Tom Perriello's Democratic campaign for Virginia governor in 2017 and formed a musical group, Perriello's Pickers, with his friends to help deliver the political message. He later performed with the group Wild Common.

Gilmore has been an outspoken critic of Dominion Energy. He currently serves as executive director of Clean Virginia, an organization established to limit the influence of monopoly energy utility Dominion Energy in Virginia politics. As Gilmore stated about legislation Dominion sponsored, "these are convenient ways to open the door to deregulation and overcharging the customer." He has also opposed two natural gas pipelines proposed for Virginia, performing with his group Wild Common at a protest event to block them, stating:

We are here today to stand up against two unnecessary and dangerous pipelines that represent corporate interests but threaten the Virginia whose hills and valleys and rivers gave birth to the musical traditions that we represent.

In his role at Wize Solutions, he promotes rural workforce development in the southwest region of Virginia. The college course Gilmore teaches at James Madison University as adjunct faculty, "Political Protest and Civil Engagement", looks at the role of protests in a democracy. His attendance at the "Unite the Right" rally in Charlottesville on August 12, 2017, was motivated by his desire to counter the evil he saw gathering there. As he explained to Judy Woodruff in an interview on PBS:

... I think any time you have this very vial (sic) ideology show its face in this country, you need to have a majority of people who reject it show up and show that the numbers are on our side. And so, that's what took me to Charlottesville that day.

Gilmore has been outspoken on the lack of restrictions on personal spending of campaign funds in his home state, saying in March 2022:

There is nothing currently stopping a political candidate in Virginia from using unlimited campaign funds, for which there is no cap in Virginia, to purchase a vacation house or a swanky country club membership. It's no wonder that public trust in our elected officials is at an all-time low. This legalization of grift is deeply embarrassing for Virginia.

== Charlottesville rally ==
Gilmore was present at the protest rally in Charlottesville, Virginia in August 2017, where he filmed the automobile ramming participants. He subsequently was the target of accusations and threats regarding his role in the incident. Gilmore says threats came in on Twitter and Facebook like: "You're a dead man walking. You're a CIA operative. You work for George Soros or Barack Obama or Hillary Clinton ... we're coming for you. We know where you are." In an interview with NPR, Gilmore stated:

I have a background in the Federal Service, a background in the Foreign Service that I'm incredibly proud of overseas, and they twisted that and said I was a CIA agent; I had been in Africa committing or organizing genocide in the overthrow of countries and then came back as part of a, you know — you name it — a George Soros, Barack Obama, Hillary Clinton-funded effort to destabilize the country through a race war with, you know, the eventual goal of overthrowing the president — just . . absolutely ridiculous allegations.

Gilmore and his family suffered other consequences. Gilmore pursued damages from media outlets in court. The complaint was filed March 13, 2018, by Georgetown Law's Civil Rights Clinic on behalf of Gilmore, in the U.S. District Court for the Western District of Virginia Charlottesville Division. Named as defendants were: Alex Jones of InfoWars, Lee Stranahan formerly of Breitbart News, Jim Hoft of The Gateway Pundit, and former Florida congressman Allen West (later dismissed from the suit). The complaint also named Free Speech Systems LLC, Lee Ann McAdoo, Scott Creighton, Derrick Wilburn, and Michele Hickford of Words-N-Ideas LLC as defendants.

In a statement, Gilmore said of the defendants named in the suit:

Today, I'm asking a court to hold them responsible for the personal and professional damage their lies have caused me, and, more importantly, to deter them from repeating this dangerous pattern of defamation and intimidation.

The controversy also affected Gilmore's relationship with musicians he admired. As he describes it, "People really distanced themselves from me and even condemned me that I grew up playing music with."

=== Resolution ===
Alex Jones, along with Free Speech Systems and Infowars, agreed in March 2022 to pay $50,000 to Gilmore to settle their part of the lawsuit. The related court order read in part:

Jones, Infowars, and FSS admit that the publication of 'Bombshell Connection Between Charlottesville, Soros, CIA' on August 15, 2017 and 'Breaking: State Department/CIA Orchestrated Charlottesville Tragedy' on August 21, 2017 did not meet the journalistic standards of Jones, Infowars and FSS. On behalf of Infowars and FSS, Alex Jones regrets those publications and their defamatory characterization of Mr. Gilmore, and agrees to retract them.

Defendants Michele Hickford of Words-N-Ideas LLC and Derrick Wilburn reached settlements in June 2021 with Gilmore – the former admitting liability for the claims asserted in the lawsuit and the latter not contesting the allegation of defamation. Former U.S. Representative Allen B. West was dismissed from the suit.

In April 2022, Infowars filed for Chapter 11 bankruptcy in Texas, delaying civil litigation while reorganizing its finances. Based in Austin, Infowars claims assets of $50,000 or less with potential liabilities of $1–10 million.

The Gilmore suit opened up further successful litigation — with massive financial judgments determined — against Jones related to his reporting of the Sandy Hook Elementary School shooting.

== Music career ==
Growing up in Lexington, Gilmore benefited from, and was influenced by the many other established musicians in the area, including Will Lee, Larry Keel, Mike Seeger, and Gary and Rooster Ruley. He is a multi-instrumentalist—performing on guitar, mandolin, banjo, and violin—and singer, who often provides lead vocals. Since forming Concordia Discors ("harmony of discordant elements") in high school, he has originated a number musical groups (while performing in others). As a songwriter, Foreign service assignments to Africa "have provided plenty of inspiration" for his original tunes. His "Kakuma" released in 2008 "delivers a chilling tale of a conflict zone in Sudan from a Blue Ridge front porch." As Gilmore states:

A lot of my songwriting has been heavily influenced by the places I've traveled. It's hard to separate the job from music when it is fueling so much of the creative process. I have a lot more to write about now.

=== Walker's Run ===
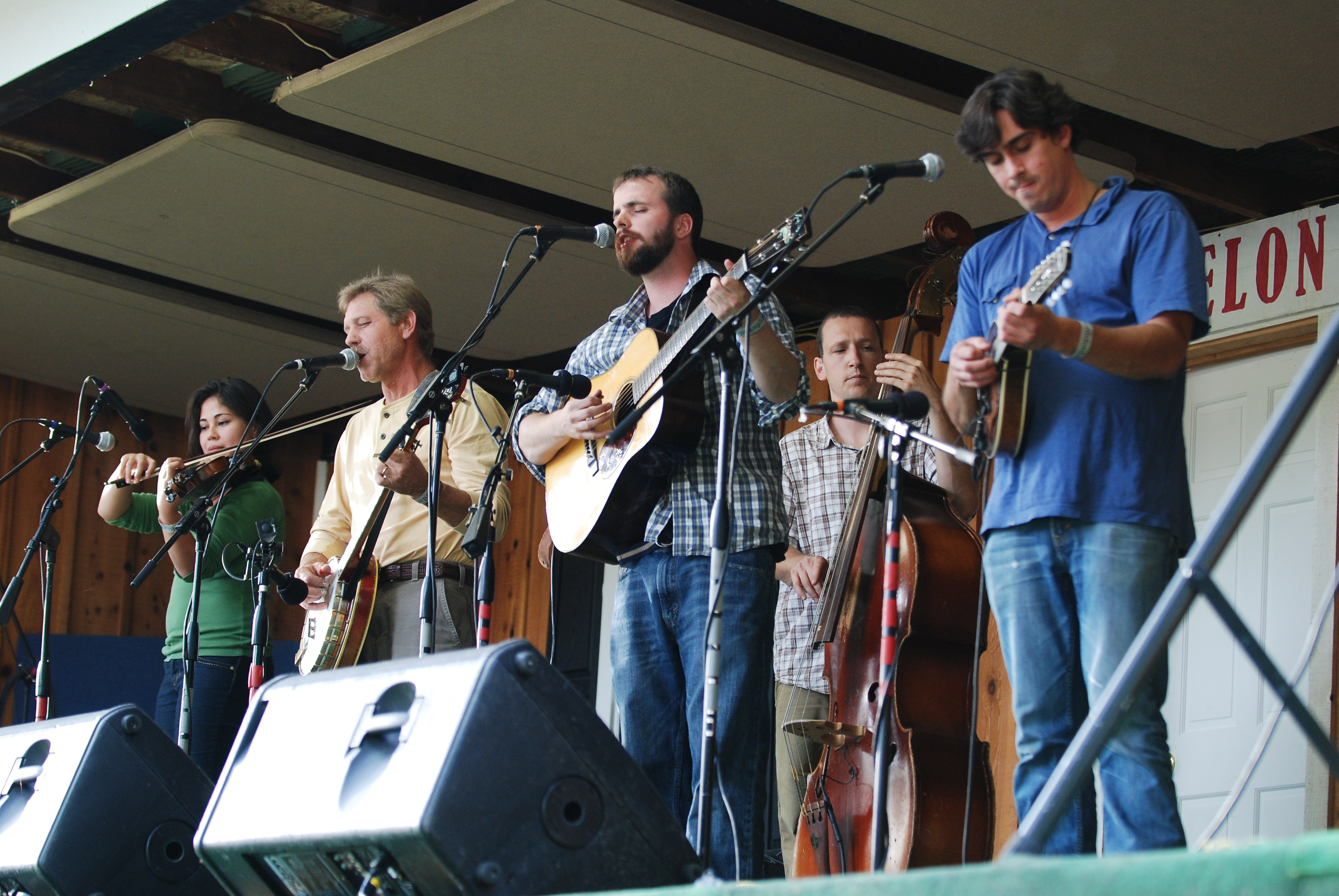
Brennan Gilmore (guitar) performs with Walker's Run at Watermelon Park Fest, Berryville, Virginia.

In 1997 Gilmore of Lexington, Virginia, gathered musicians from his hometown and from the University of Virginia to create the band Walker's Run, which "built a loyal regional following for its high-energy hoedowns." Musically the group combined Rockbridge County mountain music, Blue Ridge bluegrass, and the indie rock experience of Gilmore's high school band. In the newgrass vein, Walker's Run performs traditional bluegrass material in a hard-charging style, pushing the edges into other genres such as jazz, blues, reggae, and even rock. As Gilmore states, "There's a roughness to the music. Our sound is more raw mountain music than cleaner traditional bluegrass." They often perform Gilmore originals mixed with bluegrass covers of Beatles tunes and those by reggae star Bob Marley. The group stopped playing full-time in 2002, when Gilmore joined the Foreign Service, and has come together for "sporadic" reunions since. They released a six-song EP titled Live at Lime Kiln from a summer performance at "the idyllic outdoor theater in Lexington" in 2008—their first recording since 2000.

High-lonesome harmonies and tight picking are given some edgy grit and youth-charged muscle.

— Pulse, The Daily Progress

=== Kantara ===
After serving in Africa with the U.S. Foreign Service, Gilmore created the musical group Kantara, an Arab-Appalachian collaboration that earned him an award from the U.S. Secretary of State for its cultural impact. As Gilmore states: "A couple of old fiddle tunes have now become oud and darbouka tunes." Kantara means "bridge" in Arabic. Joining him in this project were other members of Walker's Run, including violinist Ann Marie Calhoun.

We knew the target audience had been reached when the ululating started in the back of the hall and the 11-year-old girls started dancing in the aisles.

— Philip Breeden, U.S. Department of State

=== Borden Grant ===
Gilmore started "alt-country-soul band" Borden Grant, named for the provision of land by King George II of Great Britain on which Rockbridge County, Virginia was later situated, who appeared at the Theater at Lime Kiln in Lexington in September 2010 with Ryan Chiachiere, Zack Blatter, Rob "Rubs" Hubbard, and Bryan Holmes. The group fuses "melodic rock, traditional Scots-Irish ballads, and Stax/Volt soul."

=== Wild Common ===
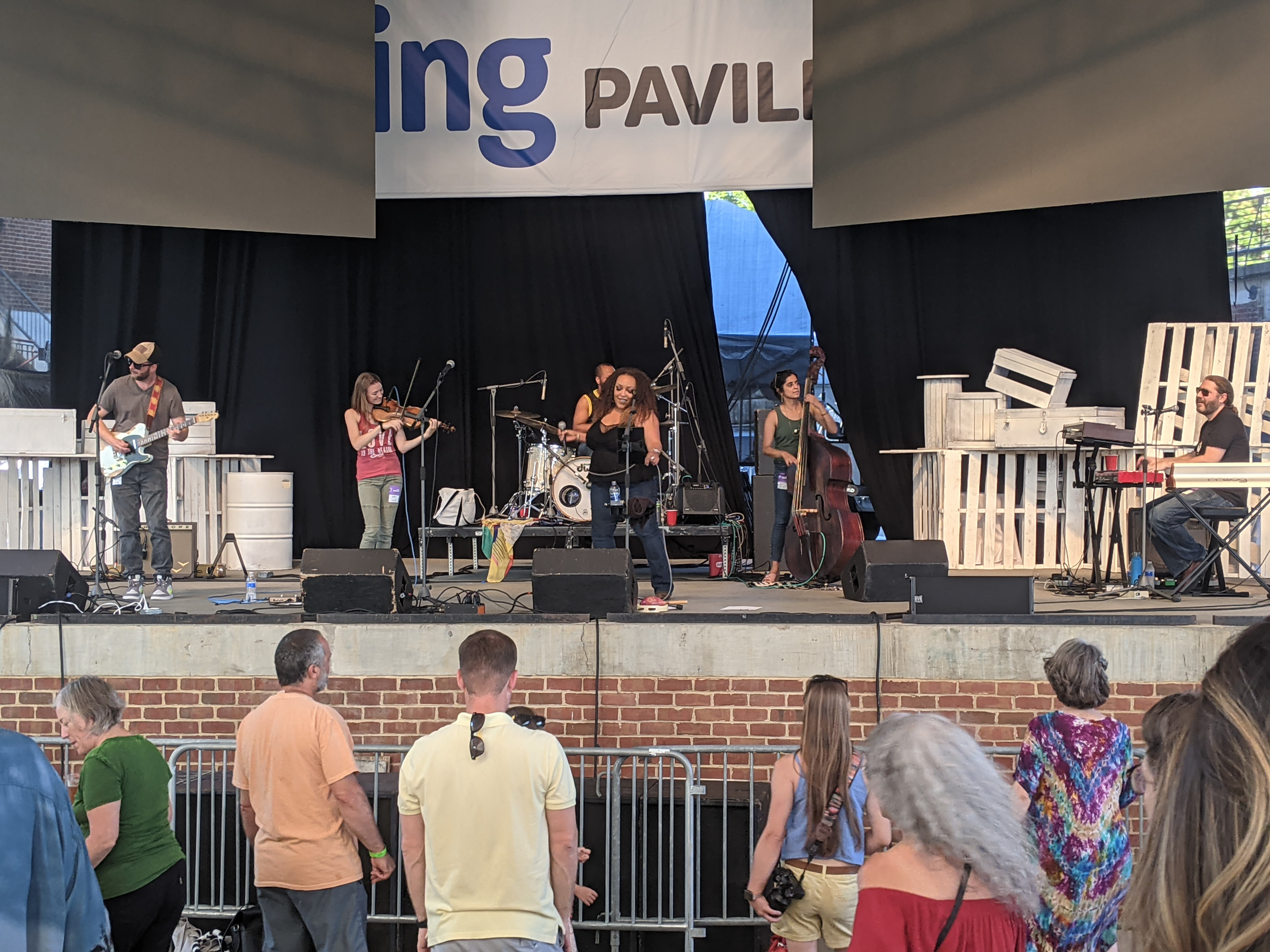
Brennan Gilmore (guitar) performs with Wild Common at Fridays After Five in Ting Pavilion, Charlottesville, Virginia.

Gilmore's new group, Wild Common, appeared at the "Water is Life Rally & Concert" in Richmond, Virginia on December 2, 2017. The group earlier performed at a "welcoming Obama to Virginia" rally—where the 44th U.S. president spoke in support of Democrat Ralph Northam in "Virginia's high-stakes gubernatorial election" on October 19, 2017 (also in Richmond). Tom Perriello, whose campaign for Virginia governor Gilmore served on, expressed excitement at attending the February 17, 2018, Charlottesville debut of the "genre-defying New Appalachian band" with his "old bus-ride seat mate" Davina Jackson as lead vocalist. In addition to Gilmore on guitar and vocals, the group features: Davina Jackson (vocals), Nate Leath (fiddle), Dhara Goradia (bass), and Rob Hubbard (drums/percussion).

While serving as chief of staff for Tom Perriello's gubernatorial campaign in 2017, Gilmore formed the Perriello Pickers, a bluegrass band which included musicians from Walker's Run, e.g., Nate Leath on violin, Will Lee on banjo, Andy Thacker on mandolin, and Zack Blatter on bass. Jay Starling, son of The Seldom Scene founder John Starling, played "dobro banjo" and Gilmore himself played guitar. They went into the studio with Davina Jackson, a gospel singer Perriello attended elementary school with, to record a new version of their "official campaign anthem".

Wild Common performed Fridays After Five in the Ting Pavilion in Charlottesville on May 3, 2019 and on June 25, 2021. Fiddler Nate Leath and multi-instrumentalist Steve Hoke make guest appearances with the group.

=== Solo ===
Gilmore's debut solo album, entitled My Name is Daniel Leek, is set for release July 17, 2026 on Concordia Records. With fiddle playing from Nate Leath and vocals from Davina Jackson, the thirteen original songs were recorded in Galax, Virginia at the home of co-producer Dori Freeman. "New Sudan", the first single from the new album was released in advance May 15, 2026.

== Personal ==
Gilmore lives in Cismont, Virginia. A rescue dog named "Jack," whom he adopted from Rockbridge County, Virginia, joined Walker's Run onstage in Little Washington, Virginia in 2016, "singing" along with the band "nearly note for note". The related video has been a hit online.

== Astrophotography ==
Originally started as a "COVID-19 lockdown project" for Gilmore had become a "passionate hobby" of astrophotography which he pursues in his backyard and elsewhere. His photograph of the Andromeda Galaxy was positively received, garnering over 70,000 upvotes on Reddit. He captured noted images of The Rotunda and Old Cabell Hall on the grounds of his alma mater, the University of Virginia, under astronomical formations. Riffing off the James Webb Space Telescope, he calls his the Brennan Gilmore Earth Telescope. Of his new hobby, Gilmore says: “I like the connection between humanity and the cosmos” as well as “the artistic aspect.” His favorite images “marry the celestial with the terrestrial and remind viewers that our home on this planet is just a small part of a much larger, deeply interconnected cosmic system.”

Gilmore captured noted images of the "green comet", whose official name is C/2022 E3 (ZTF). In May 2023, Gilmore had his telescope trained on the very galaxy where — and just days before — Japanese supernova hunter Koichi Itagawa discovered Supernova SN 2023ixf, the largest known supernova in a decade. Gilmore's images "show the before and after of an explosion that contained the energy of billions of average stars . .” His image of comet C/2025 A6 (Lemmon) taken from Cismont, Virginia on October 4, 2025 appeared in The Washington Post, Scientific American, and AP News.

== Articles ==
- Gilmore, Brennan. "What I Saw in Charlottesville Could Be Just the Beginning: How a decade of war zone diplomacy taught me the danger of enabling a cycle of hate." Politico; August 14, 2017.
- Gilmore, Brennan. "How I Became Fake News: I witnessed a terrorist attack in Charlottesville. Then the conspiracy theories began." Politico; August 21, 2017.
- Gilmore, Brennan. "Alex Jones is a menace to society. I'm suing him. Conspiracist sites such as Jones's Infowars distorted the truth about me and about Charlottesville." The Washington Post; March 14, 2018.
- "See how the northern lights dazzled in skies across the U.S." by Kasha Patel, The Washington Post; September 19, 2023 (video).
- "‘Devil comet’ could soon be visible to the naked eye. How to see it." by Dan Stillman, The Washington Post; March 16, 2024 (image).

== Honors, awards, distinctions ==
In 2006 Brennan Gilmore won the prestigious Secretary of State's Award for Public Outreach from the U.S. State Department for "ground-breaking efforts to engage non-traditional audiences and promote Arab-American cultural understanding through music" after founding Kantara—a musical group that creates an "alchemy of Appalachian old-time and bluegrass and North African melodies and rhythms"—and touring the world with it.

== See also ==
- Unite the Right rally
- Walker's Run
