= Danny Knicely =

American country and bluegrass musician (born 1975)

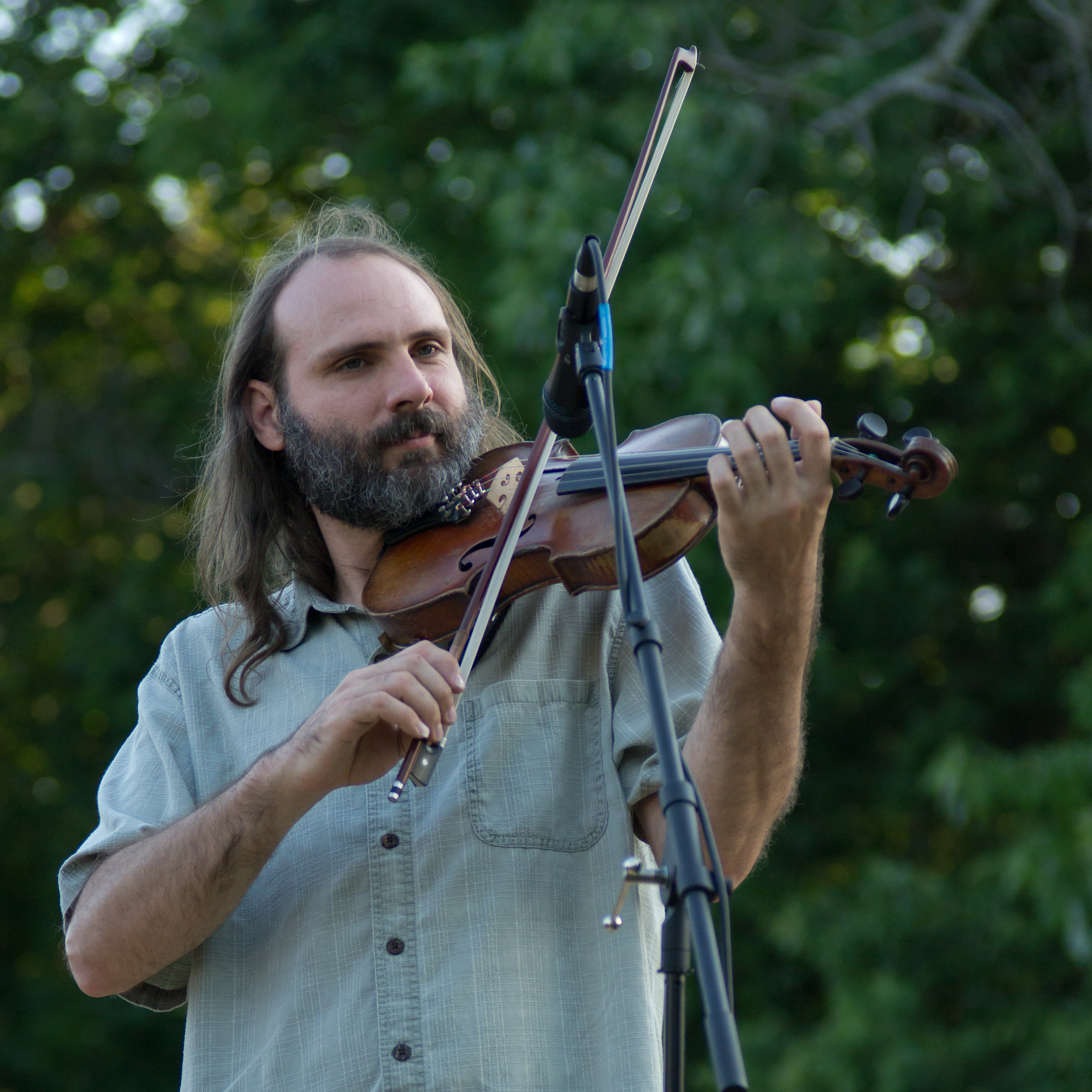
- With Furnace Mountain Band; Barns of Rose Hill in Berryville, Virginia; June 23, 2012

Background information
- Born: Daniel Shane Knicely; January 31, 1975 (age 51)
- Origin: Rockingham County, Virginia, United States
- Genres: Bluegrass; Country
- Occupations: singer-songwriter, musician
- Instruments: Vocals, guitar, fiddle, mandolin
- Years active: 1989–present
- Label: Mapleshade Records
- Website: dannyknicely.com

Daniel Shane Knicely, known as Danny Knicely, (born 1975 in Rockingham County, Virginia) is an American country and bluegrass musician. In addition to singing, he plays guitar, fiddle, and mandolin. His album releases include: The Evenin' News, Chop, Shred & Split, Waltz for Aimee, The Melody Lingers, Roots and Branches, and Murders, Drownings and Lost Loves (2006) — which he recorded with Will Lee.

He is musical director for the Mountain Music Project, a nonprofit supporting traditional musicians around the world, and played a major role in the film“The Mountain Music Project” which documents a journey Tara Linhardt and he took through the Himalayas of Nepal and the mountains of Virginia exploring the connections between these two mountain cultures (and their music).

== Early ==
Knicely's grandfather, A. O. Knicely – known as "A.O.K." – played old-time guitar, mandolin, and fiddle as leader of the Knicely Family Band from the 1930s on. His father, Glen Shelton Knicely (d. December 17, 2018), who was born August 11, 1940, in Augusta County, Virginia, played bass and banjo in A.O.K.’s band – and led his own country and bluegrass band, Dominion Express. Knicely's mother created Heartland, a country and gospel band, and the Massanutten Mountain Cloggers.

Knicely got his first instrument, a ukulele, when he was seven years old. His father tried tuned it as a mandolin and broke half the strings. When he was eight a cousin gave him a cassette taped from old Django Reinhardt 78s played on a windup Victrola, igniting a lifelong musical eclecticism.

He played upright and electric bass in his middle school band, turning professional at 14 when he joined his mother's band as a bassist providing baritone vocal harmony.

When Spike Stroop, a Virginia bluegrass fiddler, heard Danny he used him as rhythm guitarist for fiddle contests and festivals. It was at the Galax Old Fiddler's Convention that Will Lee, son of Ricky Lee who played lead guitar with the Stanley Brothers, first jammed with the 15-year-old phenom. Will lived for a while with the rest of his family on Ralph Stanley’s farm on Smith Ridge in Virginia. Lee started bringing his guitarist, the flatpicking virtuoso Larry Keel, over on weekends to jam with his new find.

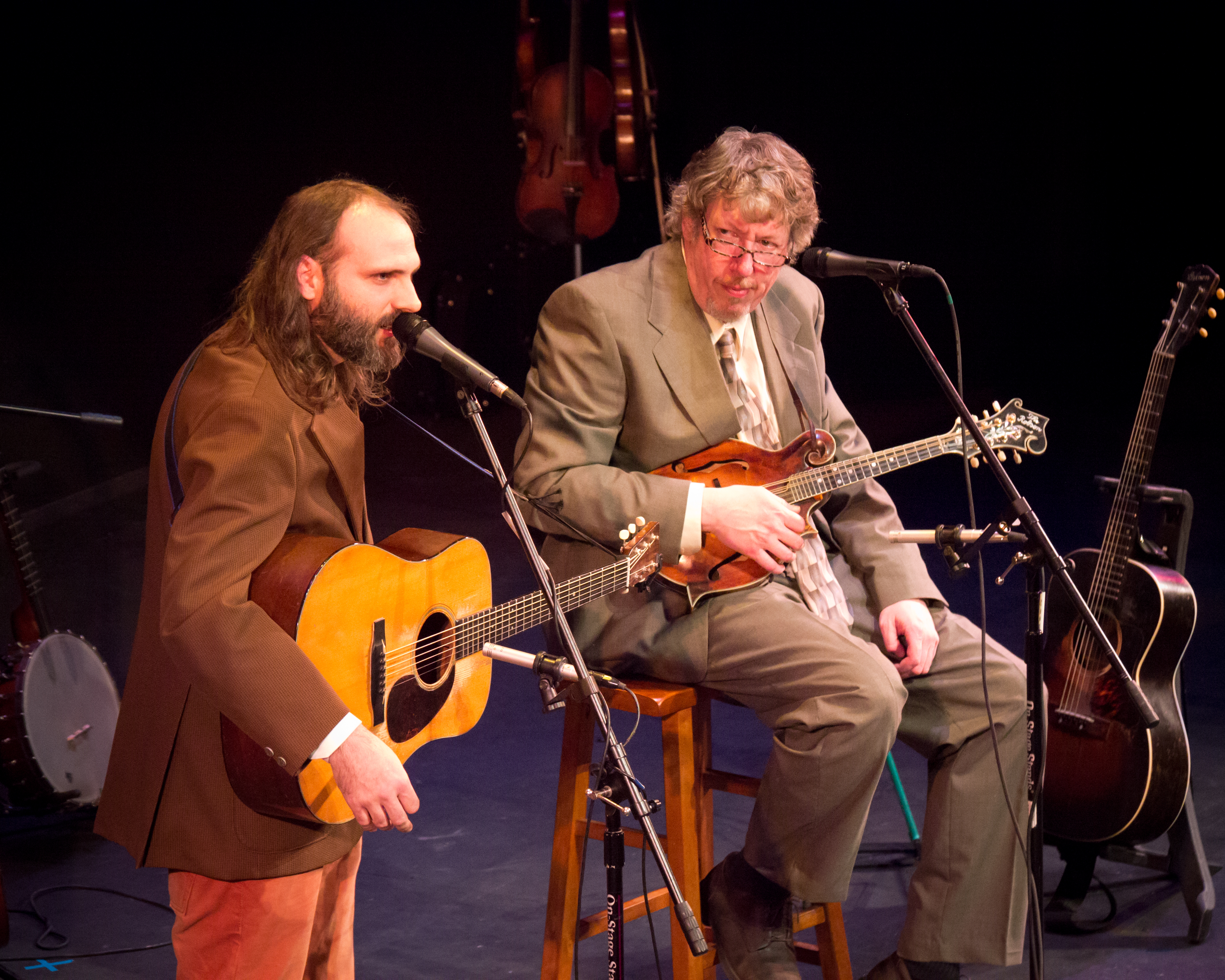
With David Via on mandolin at Knicely's Big Winter Concert 2012 in Round Hill, Virginia February 17, 2012.

This combo grew into Magraw Gap, a "high energy threesome playing wild, creative bluegrass arrangements that folded in licks from jazz, blues, rock ‘n’ roll, and even reggae." John Flower would join later. Group members called their style "spacegrass".

== Music career ==
=== Magraw Gap ===
Magraw Gap – a bluegrass band including Knicely, Will Lee, John Flower, and Larry Keel – took first place at the Telluride Bluegrass Festival in 1995. The group inspired the formation of Walker's Run in Lexington, Virginia, an act Knicely has performed with often.

=== Other groups ===
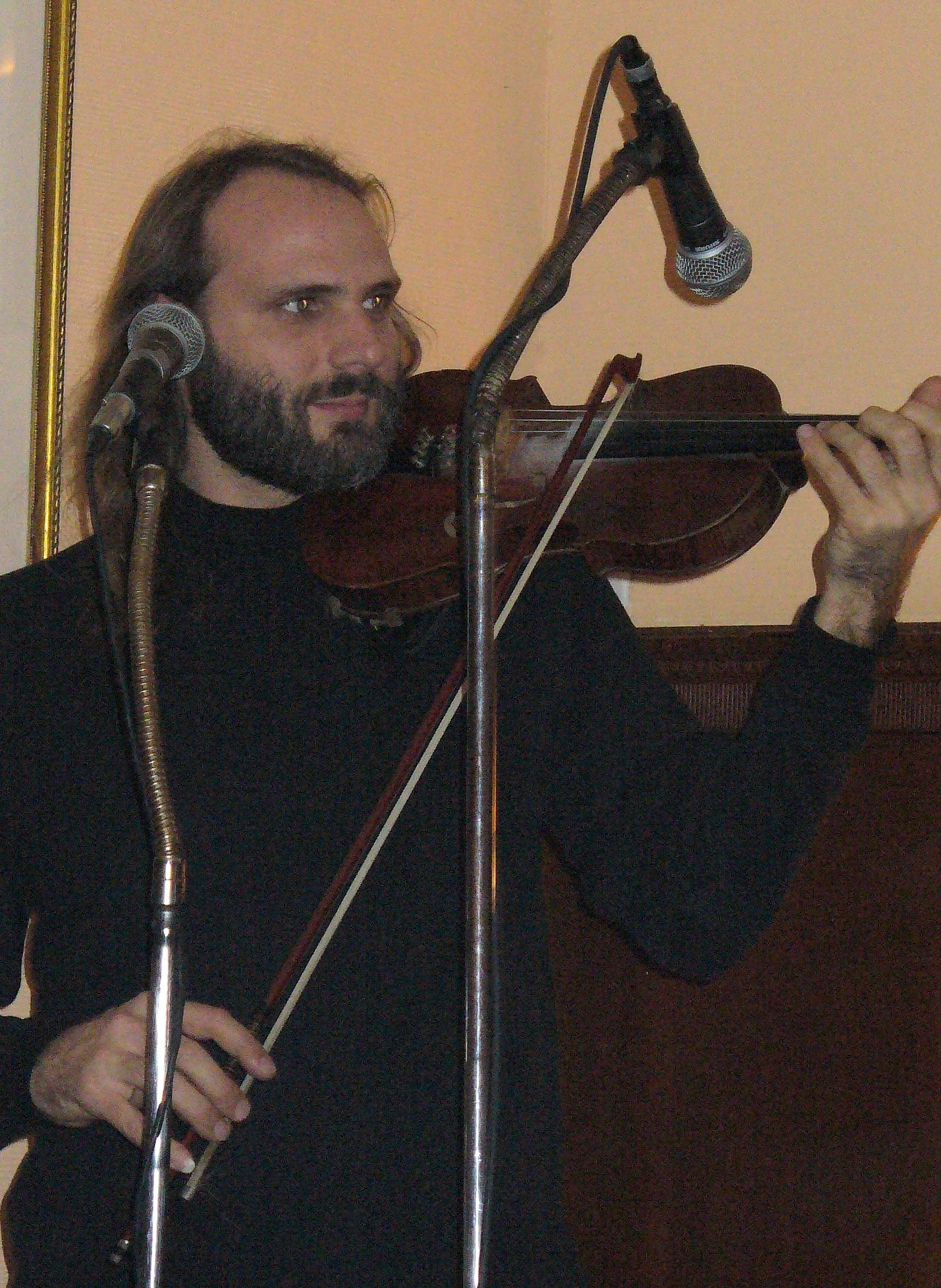
Performing with Gary Ruley and Mule Train at Southern Inn in Lexington, Virginia on December 26, 2008

Other groups Knicely has performed with include: Danny Knicely with Wyatt Rice & Mark Schatz, The Melody Lingers On, The Mountain Music Project, Rex Mcgee's Kripple Krunk, Furnace Mountain, The Meaning of Buckdance, Ouros, Bluegrass & Beyond, and Purgatory Mountain. He also performed with John Flower in David Via and Corn Tornado and with Will Lee in Walker's Run.

As session musician, producer, and arranger Knicely has recorded with such other act as Nate Leath, James Leva, Keller Williams, Tim O'Brien, Sarah Jarosz, Bruce Molsky, Tony Trischka, The Woodshedders, Rooster Ruley, Gary Ruley, and Chance McCoy of Old Crow Medicine Show.

Knicely, Will Lee, and John Flower – all original members of Magraw Gap – recorded The Evening News as a trio in 2017. The release features "originals, old favorites, a cappella numbers, hot instrumentals, and tight harmony singing."

=== Venues ===
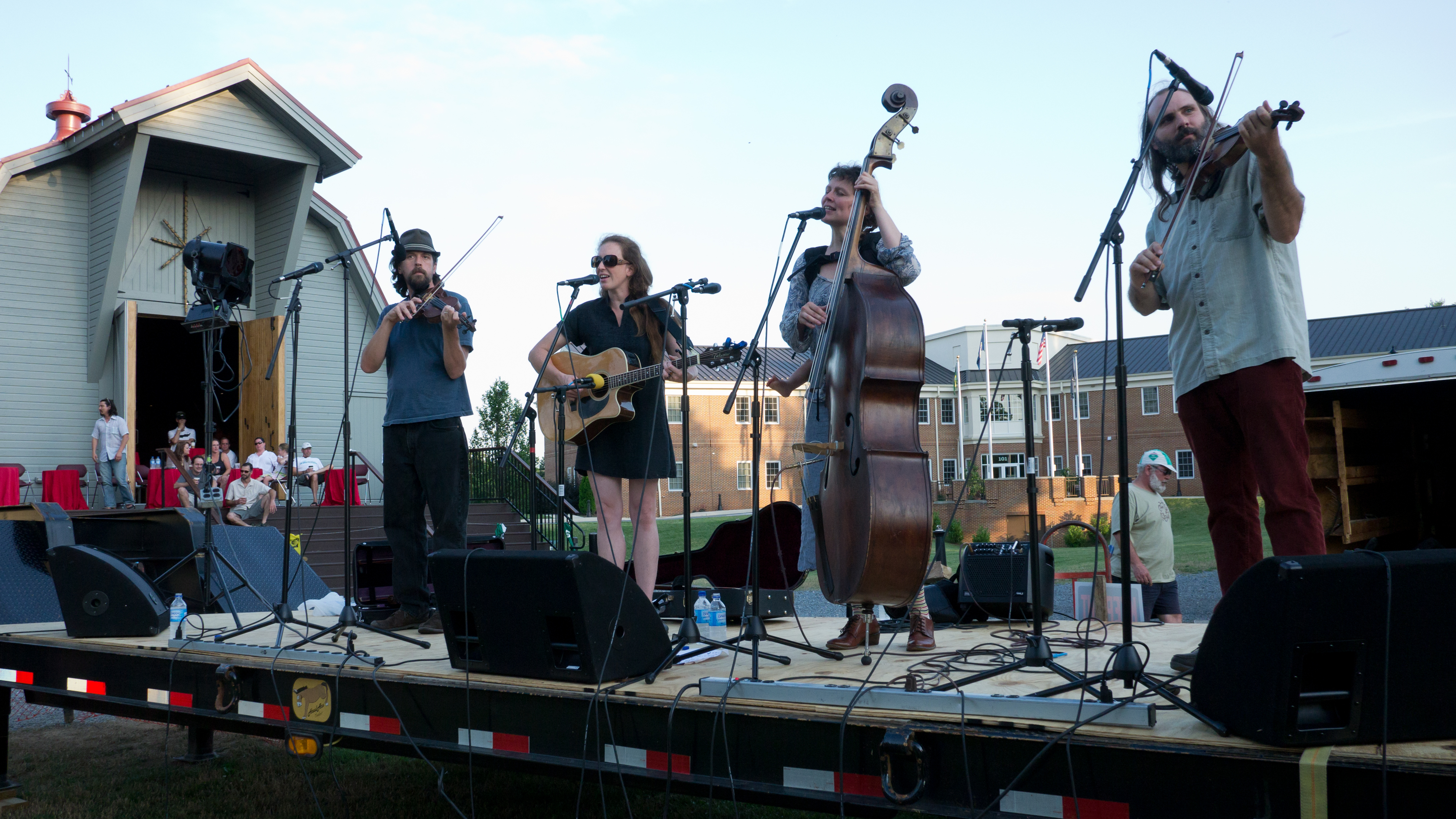
With "Fiddlin' Dave Van Deventer and Furnace Mountain

Knicely has performed at a number of music festivals, including: MerleFest, Telluride Bluegrass Festival, Rockygrass, Smilefest, Delfest, FloydFest, and the Grass Roots Festival. Prominent stages where he's performed include: the Kennedy Center, Lincoln Center, Strathmore Hall, The Prism Coffeehouse, Jefferson Theater (Charlottesville), The Birchmere, House of Blues (Los Angeles), The Fillmore Auditorium (San Francisco), Nissan Pavilion, Station Inn, Country Music Hall of Fame, and Opryland Theater.

He is considered a festival favorite for the Richmond Folk Festival for which he "assembled a cross-cultural ensemble fusing Appalachian and Brazilian music" in October 2025, performing on the Center for Cultural Vibrancy Stage with Cesar Garabini and Fernanda Bravo.

== Mountain Music Project ==
Knicely serves as musical director for the Mountain Music Project, a nonprofit organization supporting traditional musicians around the world. The feature-length film"The Mountain Music Project" documents a journey Tara Linhardt and he – both Loudoun County-based performers of bluegrass and old-time Appalachian music based (musically) in Taylorstown who have worked together for two decades – took through the Himalayas of Nepal and the mountains of Virginia as they explore the connections between these two mountain cultures.

The idea for The Mountain Music Project originated with Linhardt in college when she spent a study year in Nepal. In 2002, she and Knicely traveled back to Nepal, where she was able to reconnect with some people she knew from years ago. In Kathmandu – after meeting Buddhiman Gandharba, a member of the Gandharba musician caste – Knicely noticed during an impromptu jam session the "striking similarities" between some of the Nepalese songs and those of Appalachia. As Linhardt recalls:

One [of the Gandharba songs] sounded just like ‘Sally Anne,’ which is one of our real common fiddle tunes. So when we went back the next night, we just started playing ‘Sally Anne,’ and they were like, ‘Hey, you already figured out one of our songs.’

Knicely and Linhardt teamed with producer Jacob Penchansky in 2006 and began filming the documentary and recording related music. They traveled through Virginia to record songs and stories of traditional Appalachian musicians. The film juxtaposes clips of the Gandharba and Appalachian people "making music and talking about their lives and traditions," highlighting their "parallel traditions".

The film won best independent documentary at the Carolina Film and Video Festival, best film at the International Folk Music Film Festival in Nepal, and the Sierra Nevada Award at the Mountain Film Festival.

== Style and sound ==
As when he was with Magraw Gap, Knicely is known for playing high-energy "wild, creative bluegrass arrangements" that integrate "licks from jazz, blues, rock ‘n’ roll, and even reggae." He offers "cutting tenor" vocals on arrangements.

== Distinctions and awards ==
- Magraw Gap – including Knicely, Will Lee, John Flower, and Larry Keel – took first place at the 1995 Telluride Bluegrass Festival.
- He participated in performances dubbed "Africa Meets Appalachia", blending his musical styles with those of Cheick Hamala, a master of a traditional Malian instrument known as "ngoni", reprised as "From Mali to Appalachia" at The Floyd Country Store in Floyd, Virginia, in 2021.
- Knicely collaborated with musicians in a dozen countries across several continents including U.S. State Department tours in Morocco, Tunisia, and Russia.
- His documentary film "The Mountain Music Project" has won best independent documentary at the Carolina Film and Video Festival, best film at the International Folk Music Film Festival in Nepal, and the Sierra Nevada Award at Mountainfilm in Telluride, Colorado.
- Knicely placed 10th in Bluegrass Fiddle at the 2022 Old Fiddler Convention in Galax, Virginia.

== Discography ==
- Murders, Drownings and Lost Loves (2006)
- Roots and Branches (2007)
- The Melody Lingers (2010)
- Waltz for Aimee (2014)
- The Evenin' News (2017)
- Chop, Shred & Split (2015)

== Instruments ==
Knicely plays a vintage Martin D-18 guitar, which he showcased at a September 7, 2014, CD release concert. He prefers a Peluso P-84 microphone.

== See also ==
- Old time fiddle
- Old-time music
