= Walker's Run =

Acoustic bluegrass band in Virginia, US

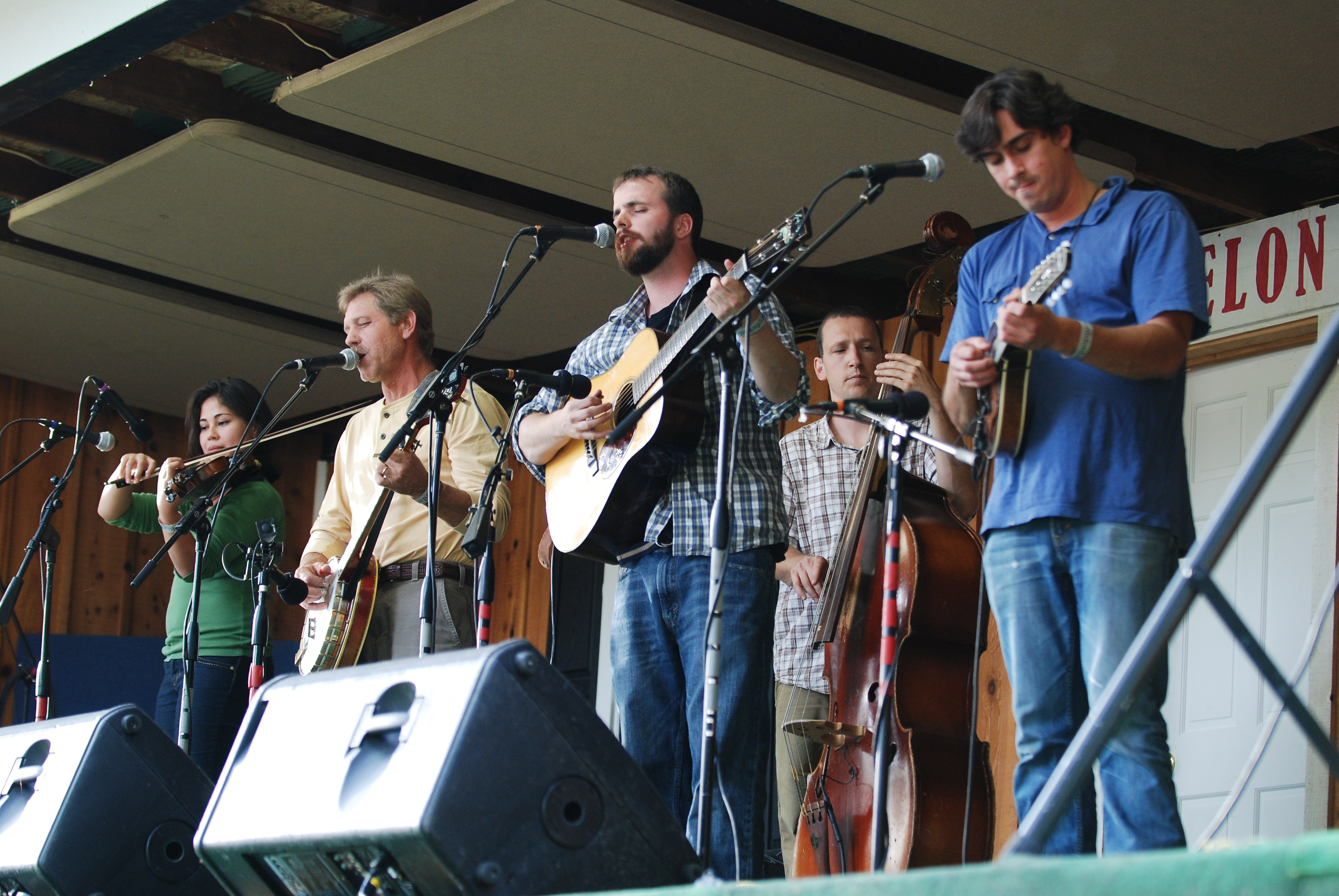
- Performing at Watermelon Park Fest; Berryville, Virginia September 25, 2009

Background information
- Origin: Rockbridge County, Virginia, United States
- Genres: Folk, Country, Americana, Bluegrass, Jazz
- Years active: 1997 to present
- Label: Concordia Discors Recordings
- Members: Brennan Gilmore; Zack Blatter; Will Lee; Andy Thacker; Nick Reeb
- Past members: Brian Calhoun; Steve Hoke; Randall Ray; Ann Marie Calhoun (née Simpson); Mary Simpson; Billy Cardine; Ben Krakauer; Mark Krakauer
- Website: walkersrun.com

Walker's Run is an acoustic bluegrass band based out of Lexington, Virginia who also play New Grass and Jazz music.

== History ==
In 1997 Brennan Gilmore of Lexington, Virginia gathered together musicians from his hometown and from the University of Virginia, where he was studying international relations, to create the band Walker's Run. The group combined Rockbridge County mountain-music, Blue Ridge bluegrass, and the Indie Rock experience of Gilmore's high school band, Concordia Discors. They packed major Charlottesville venues such as The Starr Hill Music Hall while becoming regulars at smaller venues like Millers and Michael's Bistro. Their repertoire included new takes on the "old time" canon, an eclectic group of covers and crowd favorites along with original songs. The Walker's Run sound is best defined by compositions like "Torrent" by songwriter Gilmore.

The band sold thousands of copies of their eponymous debut CD Walker's Run before taking a long-term hiatus in 2002 when their founder began his professional career as a United States Foreign Service Officer which takes him to long-term posts abroad. During Gilmore's stateside posts, the band reunites and invites new fans to local shows. In the interim band members have continued separate musical careers, including collaborations with Sub-Saharan and North African musicians and reggae fusion to producing bluegrass records.

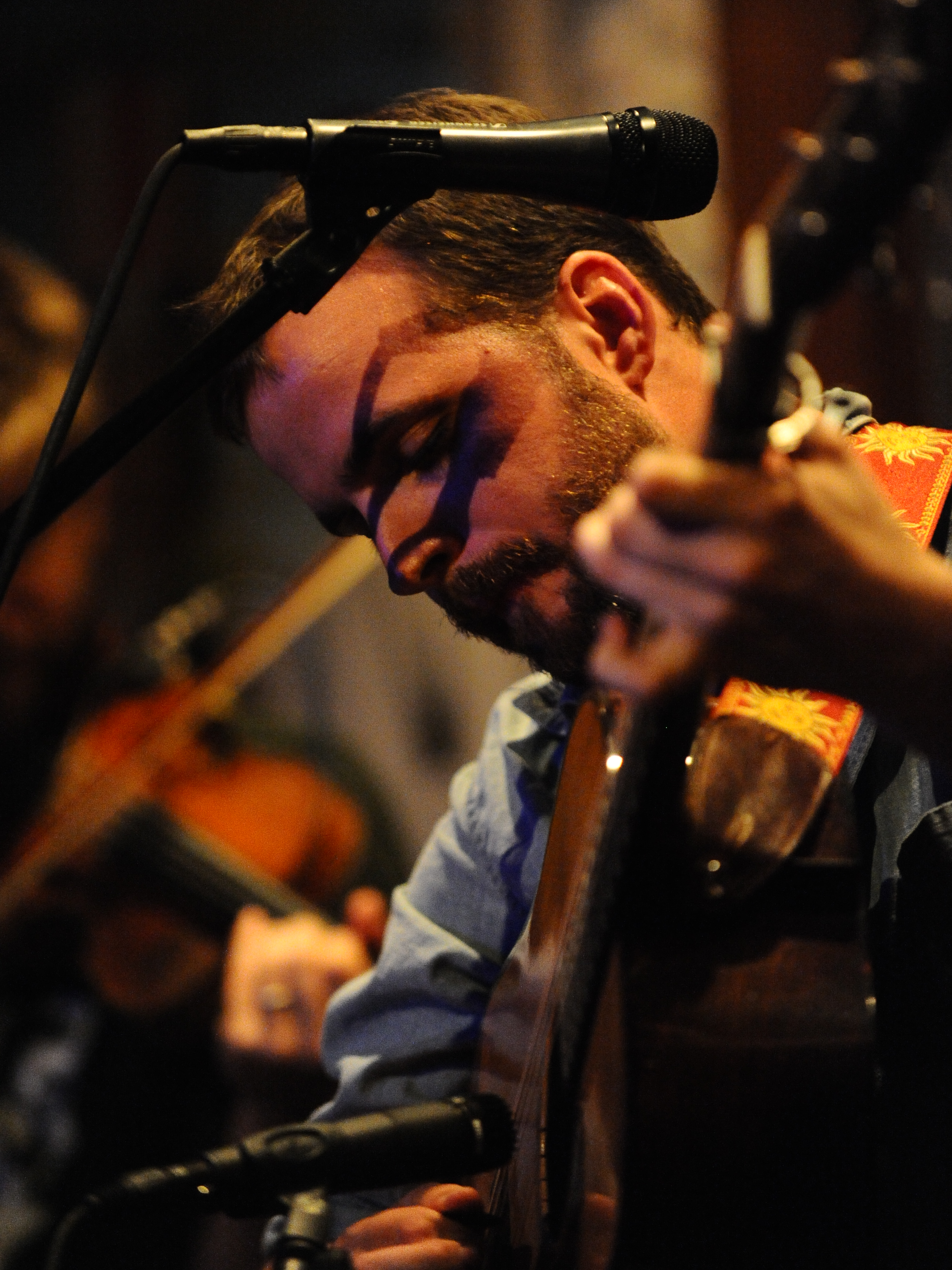
Founder Brennan Gilmore at Solly's Tavern in Washington, D.C., 2010.

In 2009, the group re-formed, welcoming two new members, mandolin player Andy Thacker with Adrienne Young and Fairweather Bums, and fiddler Nick Reeb of King Wilkie. The other band members are founding members Brennan Gilmore on guitar (switching from mandolin) and vocals and Zack Blatter on upright bass. Will Lee, of the legendary Magraw Gap and an early musical mentor to the younger Walker's Run members growing up in Rockbridge County, often joins the group on banjo and vocals.

Early members of the group from Lexington, Brian Calhoun and Randall Ray, ended up making instruments together − forming Rockbridge Guitar Company to ply their craft and trade.

== Other groups ==
Two members of Magraw Gap, the musical inspiration for Walker's Run, have performed with the group: Will Lee and Danny Knicely. Lee and Knicely also perform as a duo. Lee's father joined the Stanley Brothers as lead guitarist after playing with Bluegrass Tar Heels, special protégées of Bill Monroe. Ann Marie Calhoun (née Simpson) has toured with Jethro Tull's Ian Anderson, performed with Ringo Starr, and played with the rock supergroup SuperHeavy — Mick Jagger, Dave Stewart, Joss Stone, AR Rahman, and Damian Marley — on their debut studio album.

Early Walker's Run members Billy Cardine and Ben Krakauer have helped form other groups — The Biscuit Burners and Old School Freight Train respectively – in addition to their own solo careers. Ann Marie's sister Mary Simpson, who has also played fiddle and sung with the group, has originated Whisky Rebellion. She joined Yanni in September 2010, for his South American tour, also performing with the composer in Puerto Rico.

Gilmore, Lee, Knicely, and Calhoun perform with another group out of Lexington and Rockbridge County, Gary Ruley and Mule Train. As Gary Ruley states: "There's so many great pickers who live in or near Rockbridge County that it's not difficult to get a bunch of friends together and make music."

== Performance ==
Walker's Run and its members have appeared on stages throughout the United States and overseas, including the Kennedy Center, Telluride Bluegrass Festival, Theater at Lime Kiln, and many others. Walker's Run were highlighted at the 2009 Watermelon Park Festival in Berryville, Virginia, where Magraw Gap had reunited for an appearance the year prior – and Gary Ruley and Mule Train performed the following year.

== Musical style ==
Walker's Run performs traditional bluegrass material in a hard-charging "mountain metal" style, always pushing the edges into other genres such as jazz, blues, reggae, and even rock. They perform bluegrass covers of Beatles tunes together with those by reggae great Bob Marley.

There's a roughness to the music. Our sound is more raw mountain music than cleaner traditional bluegrass.

— founder Brennan Gilmore

== Distinctions, honors, and awards ==
- Their self-release EP Silver was named one of Peter Jones' Best Folk Albums of 2015 in the Folk Department of WTJU, University of Virginia radio station.
- In April 2012 the group performed at the Sala de Conciertos La Paz (SCON) as a benefit for La Escuela de Música del Estado, the state music school of Mexico in La Paz, Baja California Sur, México.
- Gary Ruley and Mule Train were the 2010 winners of the Rockbridge County, Virginia Chamber of Commerce Rockbridge Community People's Choice Awards "Group Arts/Entertainer of the Year".
- Ann Marie Calhoun was the winner of the "My Grammy Moment" contest at the 50th Grammy Awards on February 10, 2008, playing live with the Foo Fighters during the broadcast.
- The Pat Ruley Trophy for Best All Around Blue Grass Performer at the Maury River Fiddler's Convention—which held its 17th annual event in 2010 in Buena Vista, Virginia—was won by Will Lee in 2008.
- In the past half-decade current and previous members of Walker's Run have won numerous awards at the Maury River Fiddler's Convention including first-place finishes for Will Lee on guitar in 2005, 2007, and 2008, and second place awards to Danny Knicely for bluegrass fiddle in 2007 and 2009, and to Will Lee for guitar in 2006.
- Will Lee's father joined the legendary Stanley Brothers as lead guitarist after playing with Bluegrass Tar Heels, special protégées of Bill Monroe. On his mother's side, Grandpa Clark was a fine ragtime pianist whose two sons both play guitar, while William Penmon Lee, the grandfather he was named after, was a respected clawhammer banjo player in Alabama and Mississippi.
- Danny Knicely's grandfather, A. O. Knicely, played old time guitar, mandolin, and fiddle as leader of the Knicely Family Band. His father played bass and banjo in A.O.K.'s band; he also led his own country and bluegrass band, Dominion Express. Danny's mother had two groups: Heartland, a country and gospel band, as well as a large dance troupe, the Massanutten Mountain Cloggers.
- Magraw Gap, a band including Will Lee and Danny Knicely, took first place at the Telluride Bluegrass Festival in 1995.

== Personnel ==
- Brennan Gilmore—guitar/vocals
- Will Lee—banjo/vocals
- Andy Thacker— mandolin/vocals
- Zack Blatter — bass
- Nick Reeb — fiddle/vocals

=== Previous members ===
- Ann Marie Calhoun (née Simpson)—fiddle/vocals
- Mary Simpson
- Brian Calhoun—guitar
- Steve Hoke—fiddle
- Randall Ray—guitar
- Billy Cardine—dobro
- Ben Krakauer—banjo
- Mark Krakauer—guitar
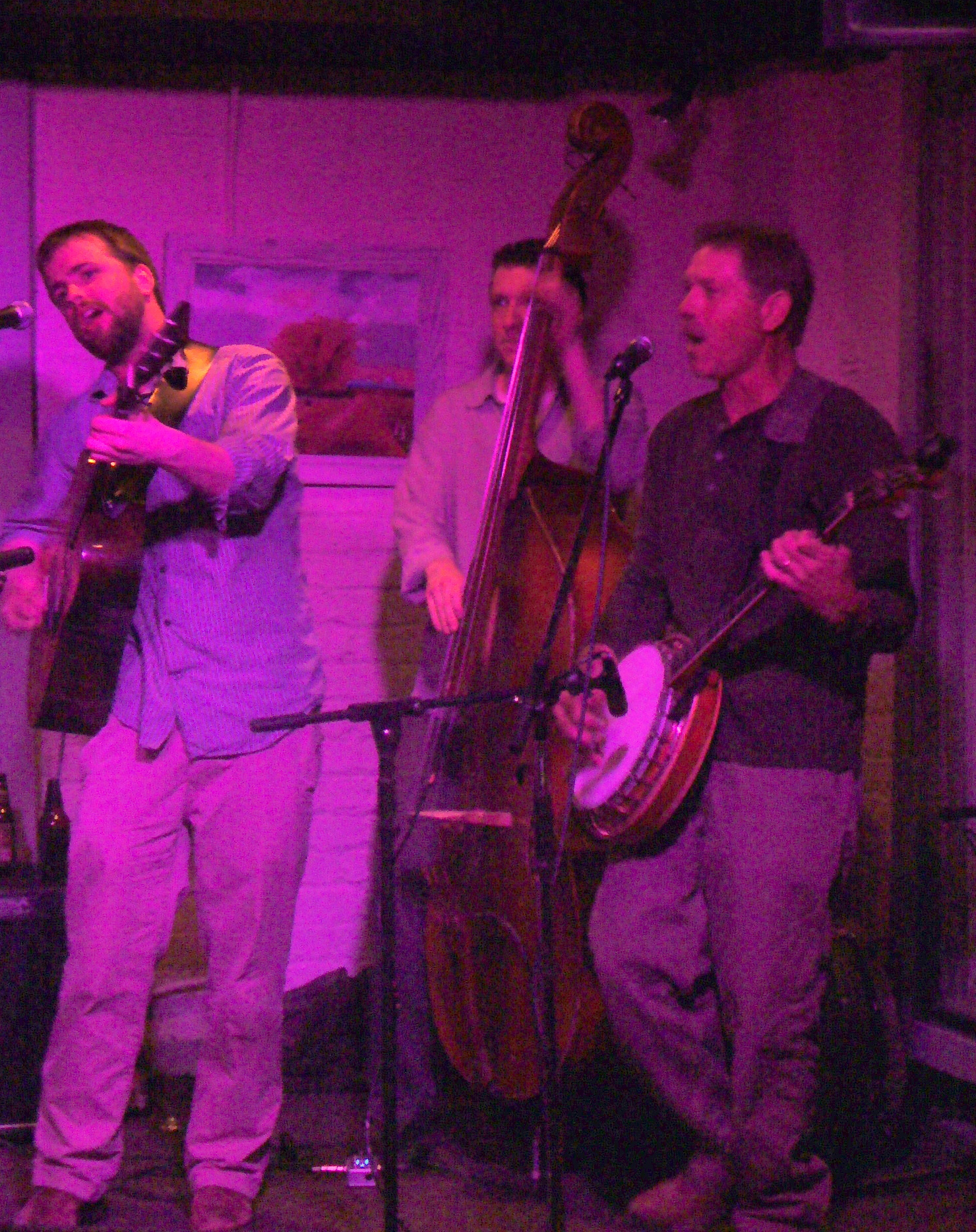
Brennan Gilmore (guitar), Zach Blatter (bass), Will Lee (banjo) of Walker's Run perform at Bel Rio in Charlottesville, Virginia
April 17, 2009.

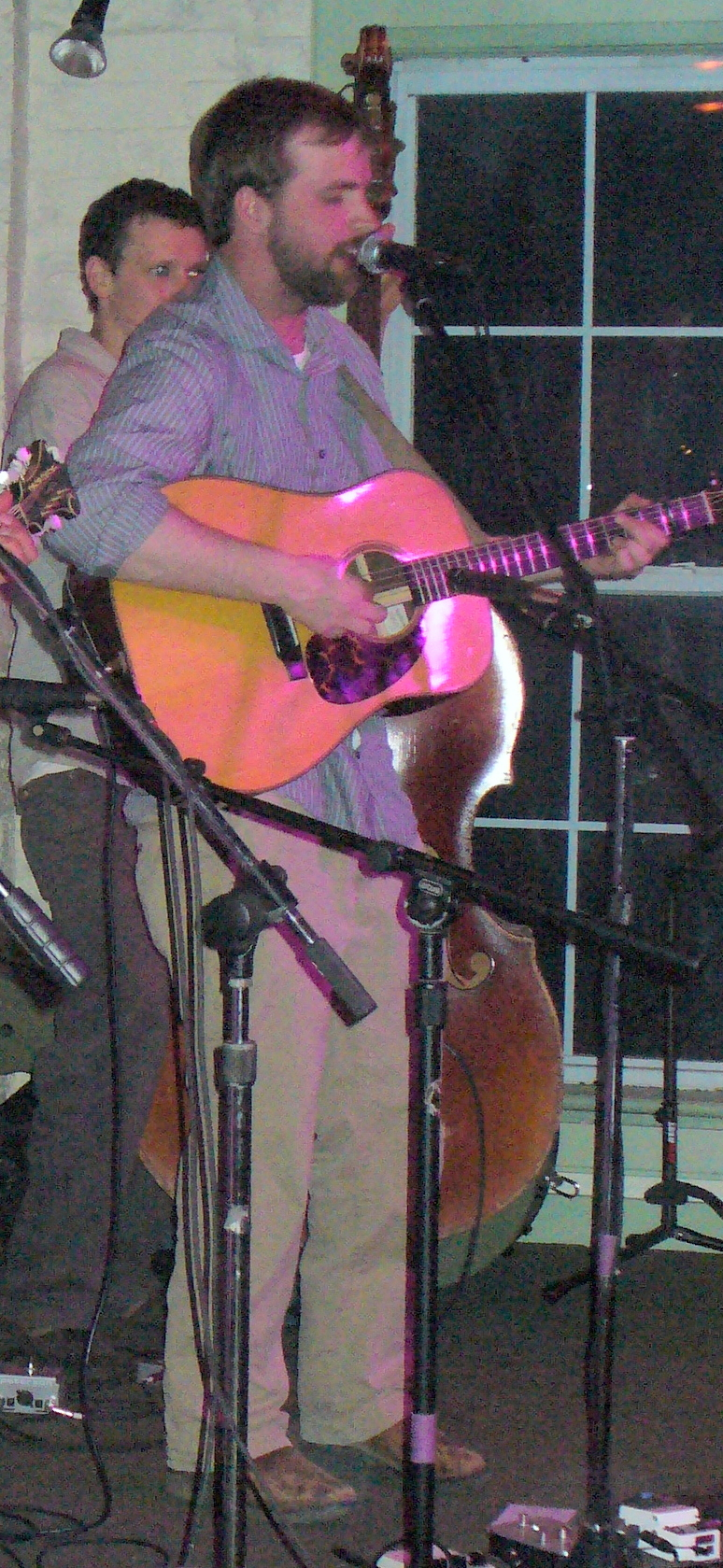
Brennan Gilmore on guitar at Bel Rio in Charlottesville, Virginia April 17, 2009.

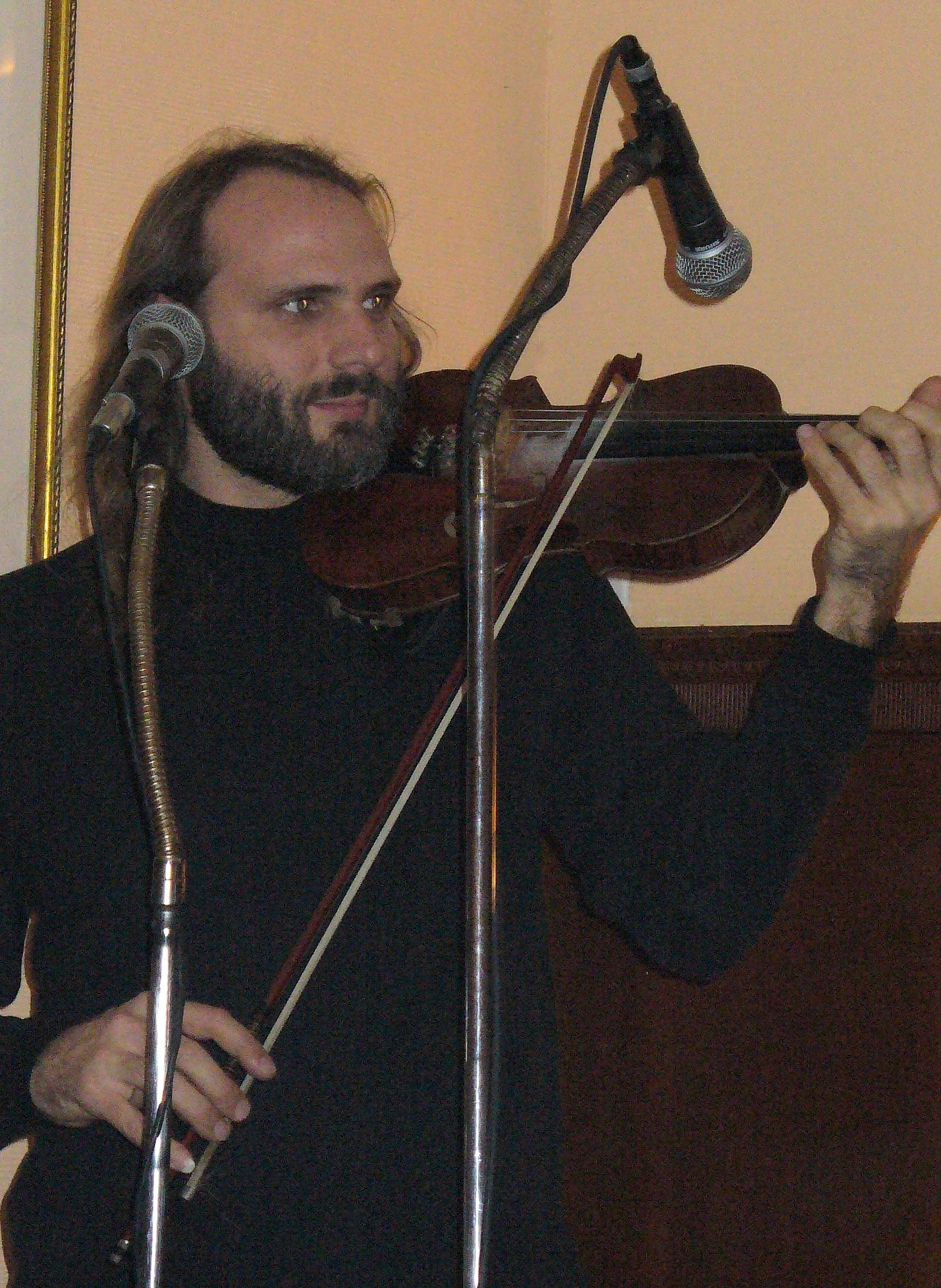
Danny Knicely on violin, playing with Gary Ruley and Mule Train at The Southern Inn in Lexington, Virginia, Christmas 2008

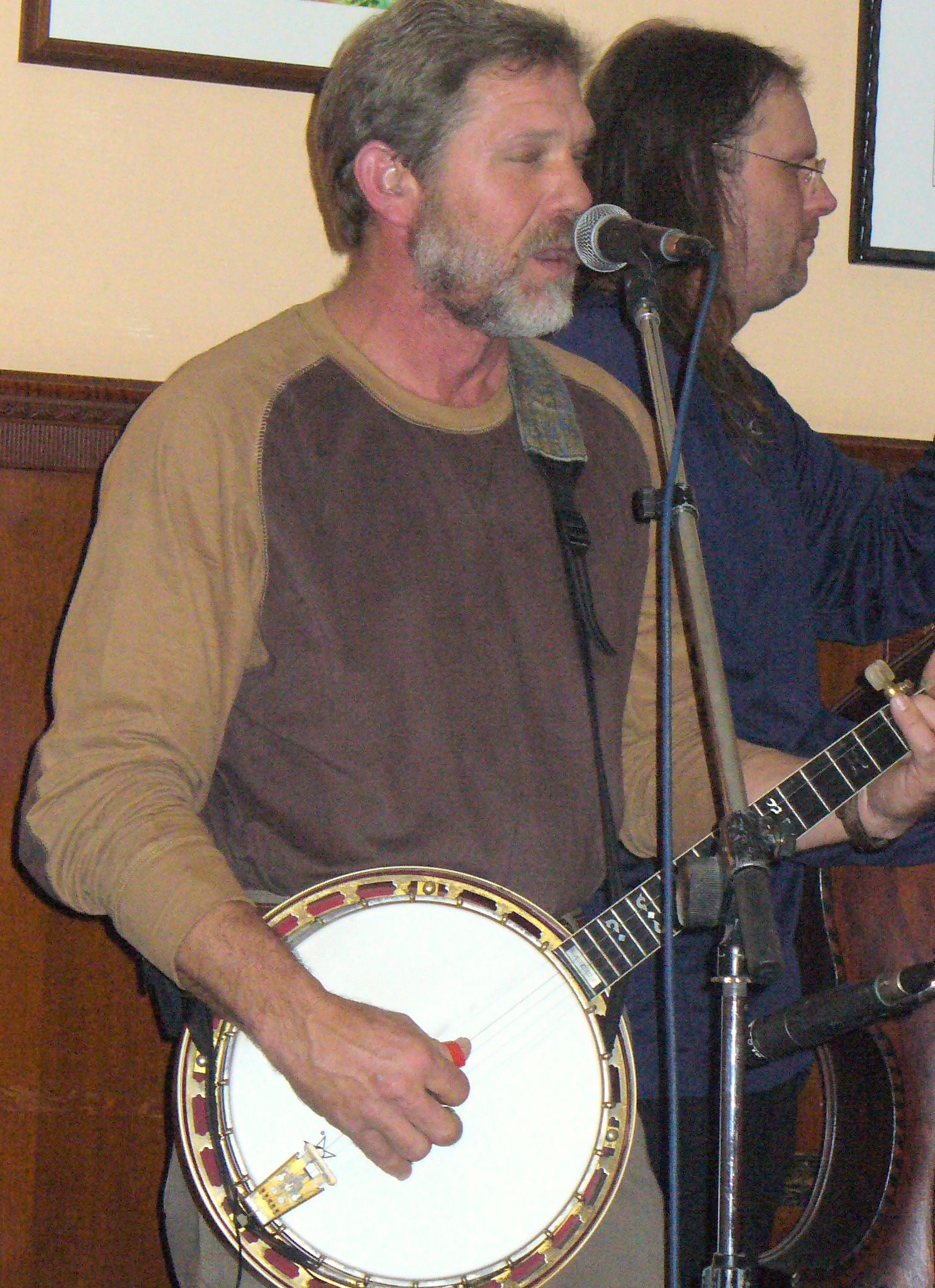
Will Lee on banjo, David Knicely on bass, playing with Gary Ruley and Mule Train at The Southern Inn in Lexington, Virginia, Christmas 2008

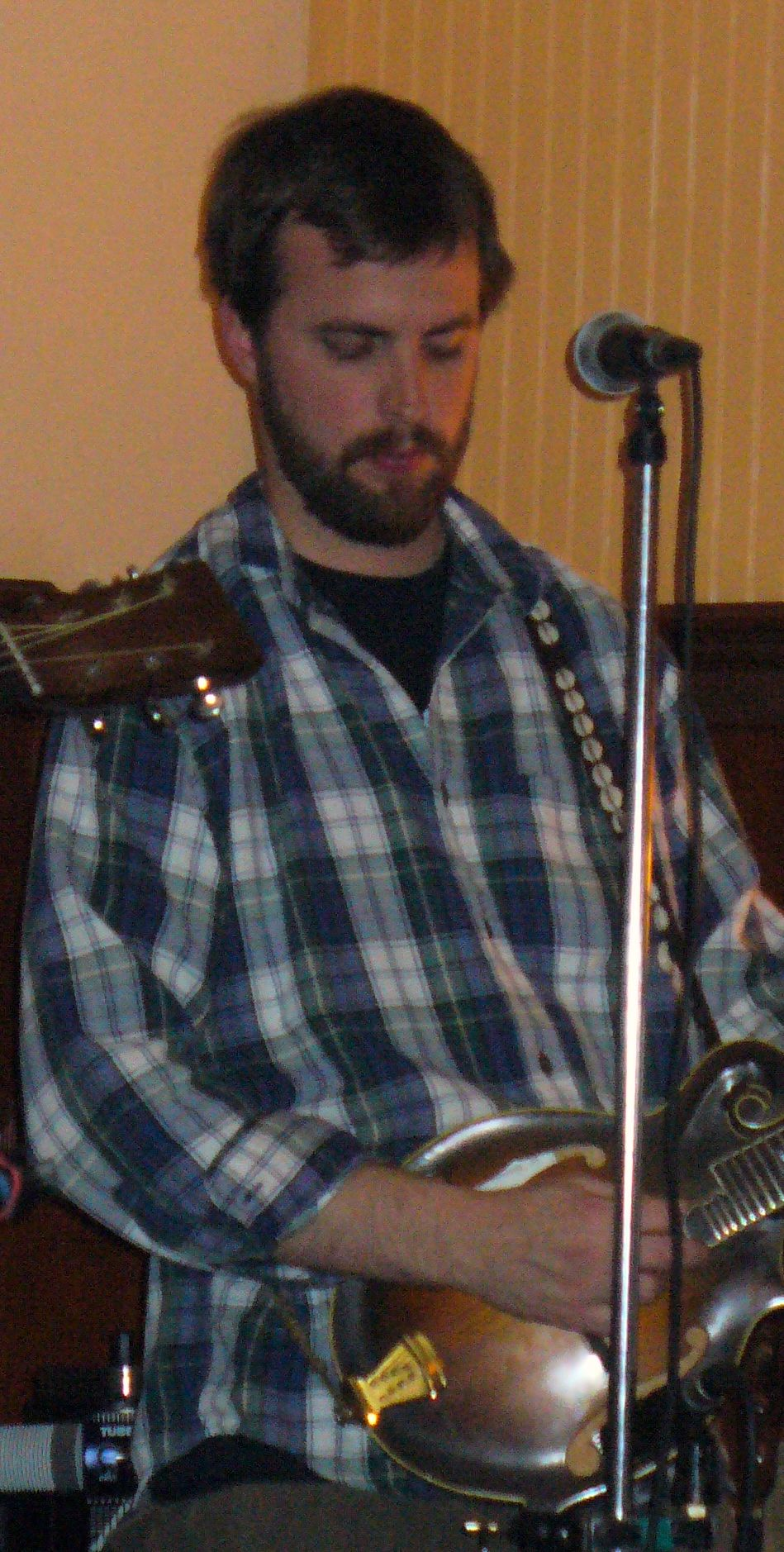
Brennan Gilmore on mandolin, playing with Gary Ruley and Mule Train at The Southern Inn in Lexington, Virginia, Christmas 2008

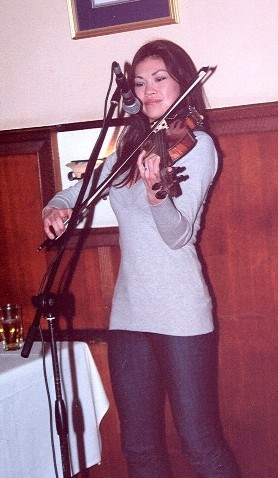
Ann Marie Calhoun on violin, playing with Gary Ruley and Mule Train at The Southern Inn in Lexington, Virginia, Thanksgiving 2008

== Discography ==
- Silver (2015) self-release EP.
- Live at Lime Kiln (2009), recorded at the Theater at Lime Kiln in Lexington, Virginia on September 6, 2009.
- Walker's Run (2000), Concordia Discors Recordings—ASIN: B000059M4W

== Video ==
- Walker's Run & Friends last song and encore at Theater at Lime Kiln 5/29/11
- Walker's Run at Gravity Lounge in Charlottesville, VA February 9, 2008.
- Orange Blossom Special published January 31, 2008: Gary Ruley and Mule Train play "Orange Blossom Special" with twin fiddles. Features Gary Ruley, Ann Marie Calhoun, Brennan Gilmore, Danny Knicely, and Will Lee.
- East Virginia Blues published January 28, 2008: Rockbridge County bluegrass at its best, featuring Gary Ruley, Brennan Gilmore, Will Lee, Ann Marie Calhoun, and David Knicely.
- Great Balls of Fire published March 14, 2008: New song for the bluegrass repertoire of Gary Ruley and Mule Train, featuring Gary Ruley (guitar), Will Lee (banjo), Brennan Gilmore (mandolin), David Knicely (bass), and Mary Simpson (fiddle) at Queen City Brewery, Staunton, Virginia.
- Ruley's Side Show Circuit with Ann Marie Calhoun published March 10, 2008: Gary Ruley plays the Downtown Lexington Festival 2001 with Ann Marie Calhoun (fiddle), Rooster Ruley (banjo), and Brennan Gilmore (mandolin).

== See also ==
- Bluegrass music
- Old-time music
- Lexington, Virginia
- Rockingham County, Virginia
- Ann Marie Calhoun
- Gary Ruley and Mule Train
