= Gary Ruley and Mule Train =

Acoustic bluegrass band in Virginia, US

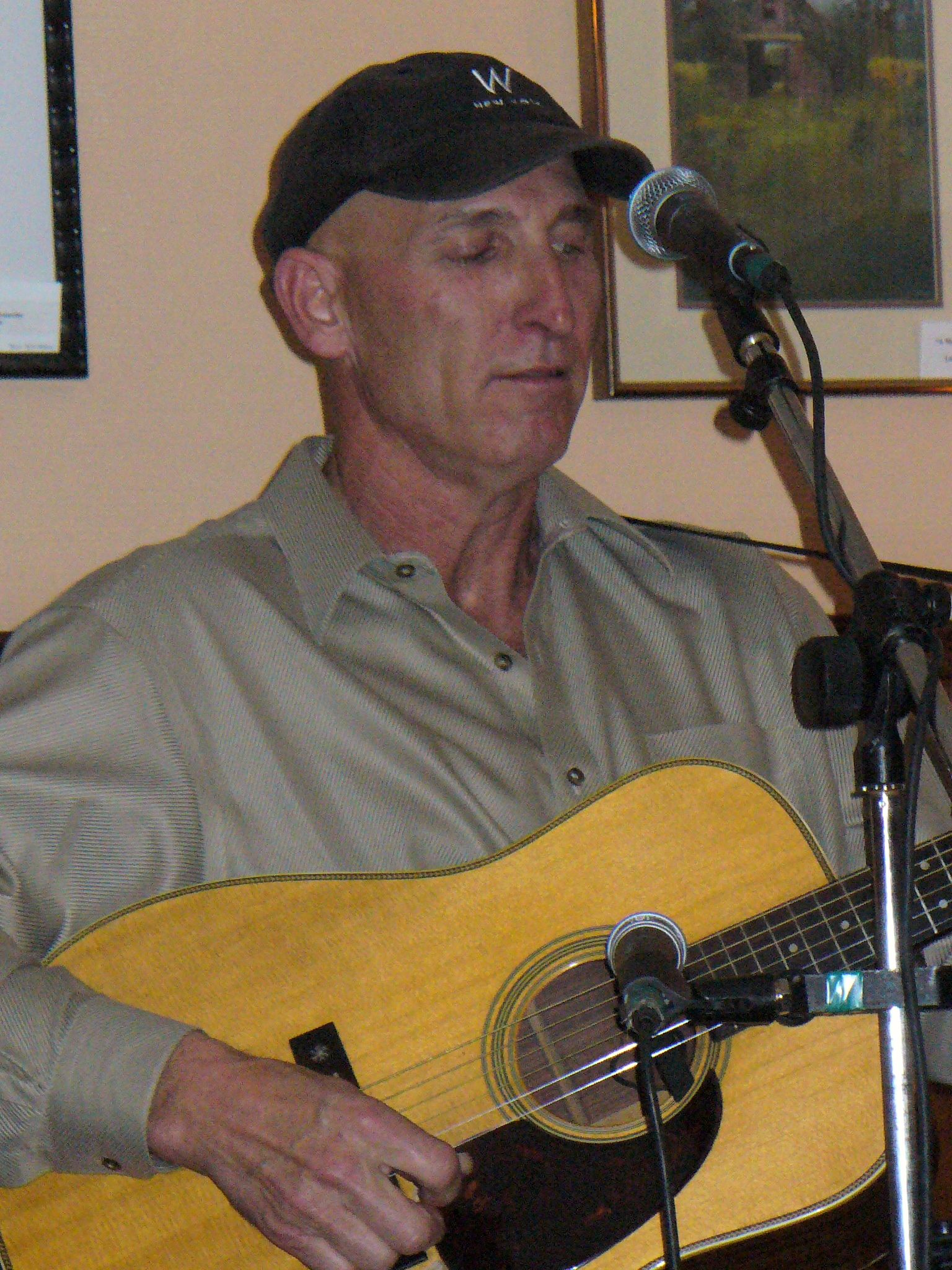
- Ruley performing in December 2008

Background information
- Origin: Rockbridge County, Virginia, U.S.
- Genres: Folk, Country, Americana, Bluegrass, Jazz
- Members: Gary Ruley; Danny Knicely; Will Lee; Brennan Gilmore; David Knicely; Ann Marie Calhoun (née Simpson); Mary Simpson; Ronald "Rooster" Ruley; Jeremiah Ruley; Larry Keel; Jenny Keel; Nate Leath; Shannon Wheeler
- Website: Official Site

Gary Ruley and Mule Train is an acoustic bluegrass band based in Lexington, Virginia who also play New Grass and Jazz music.

== Early ==
Gary Ruley was born into a musical family in Lexington, Virginia, and first performed publicly at ten. He has performed with his father, Pat Ruley, his brother, Ronald "Rooster" Ruley, and his son, Jeremiah Ruley. "Sisters Sandy, Sue and Kathy . . were strong musicians in their own rights." The strong musical tradition of his hometown rooted the musical Ruley family in bluegrass and mountain music. The Ruleys were "ahead of the curve that became the explosion of bluegrass popularity commencing in the mid-1970s." Gary's musical journey was launched by many performances at a young age singing and flatpicking in and around Lexington, which was at the time a "hotbed of nightly entertainment of live acoustic music. Many nights would feature four or five different bands performing at various venues."

He grew up performing with diverse musicians for functions at Washington and Lee University, Virginia Military Institute, The University of Virginia, and various weddings and socials.

== Performance ==
Gary Ruley's flat picking has earned him honors and awards at numerous festivals, and made him much sought-after regionally.

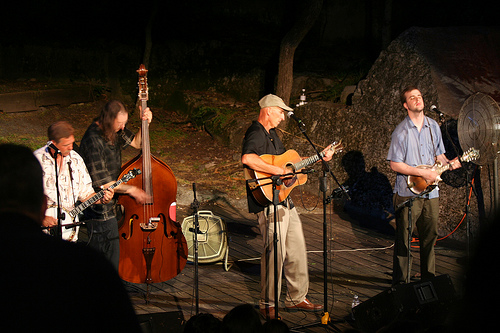
Gary Ruley and Mule Train at Lime Kiln Theater in Lexington, Virginia on June 7, 2008. Image by Suzie Kelly.

He has played with many of the greats of the bluegrass genre—including those associated with the "first-generation" bluegrass legends, such as Bill Monroe's fiddle player, Bobby Lester, as well as Buddy Pendleton who performed with Monroe, and Mac Wiseman who played with both Monroe and Earl Flatt and Lester Scruggs. He's also played with Ricky Lee—Will Lee's father—who played with Ralph Stanley, as well as Doc Watson's partner Jack Lawrence. He's appeared with John Starling of Seldom Scene, Mike Seeger, Tony Rice, and the late Vassar Clements. He has also picked with some of the newer generation bluegrass greats such as Darol Anger, two-time Grammy Winner Curtis Burch of New Grass Revival, and opened for Ricky Skaggs and Kentucky Thunder (Skaggs himself joined Ralph Stanley's band as a teenager).

Ruley has performed at major regional venues and music festivals, including: Lime Kiln Theater in Lexington, The Homestead in Hot Springs, Garth Newel Music Center in Warm Springs, The Greenbrier in White Sulphur Springs, and FloydFest in Floyd County. In North Carolina he's appeared at Black Mountain and Union Grove

He has also toured out West with the Keels in California and Utah and performed in Amsterdam. He has appeared on PBS radio.

=== Mule Train ===
Gary Ruley and Mule Train serves as a vehicle for bringing together the best musicians in the area for specific shows (or recordings). As Gary states, "There's so many great pickers who live in or near Rockbridge County that it's not difficult to get a bunch of friends together and make music." The musicians who appear with Ruley come with long musical pedigrees and from a number of other groups they've formed themselves. Will Lee's father joined the legendary Stanley Brothers as lead guitarist after playing with Bluegrass Tar Heels, special protégées of Bill Monroe. David and Danny Knicely's grandfather, A. O. Knicely, played old time guitar, mandolin, and fiddle as leader of the Knicely Family Band. Danny and Will perform as a duo. Larry Keel, "arguably one of the greatest flat-picking guitarists in the world", has headed up The Larry Keel Experience—now renamed Larry Keel & Natural Bridge—and also performs in Keller and the Keels with his wife Jenny. Will Lee, Larry Keel, and Danny Knicely were all founders of legendary Magraw Gap, a band that took first place at the Telluride Bluegrass Festival in 1995. Brennan Gilmore originated Walker's Run, Kantara, and most recently Borden Grant. Ann Marie Calhoun (née Simpson) has toured with Jethro Tull's Ian Anderson and performed with Ringo Starr. Her sister Mary Simpson also plays fiddle and sings with the group when not performing with her own Whisky Rebellion. She joined Yanni in September 2010, for his South American tour, also performing with the composer in Puerto Rico.

They are known for Thanksgiving and Christmas shows at the Southern Inn in Lexington, Virginia. Their latest release, The Southern Inn and Out (2010), is a recording of the 2009 Christmas show there. Since the Southern Inn burned in July 2010 other locations are used. The 2010 Christmas show, on December 30, takes place at the Southern Inn's new temporary location across town, and will feature regulars Danny Knicely, Will Lee, David Knicely, and Brennan Gilmore (with others).

They were the 2010 winners of the Rockbridge County, Virginia Chamber of Commerce Rockbridge Community People's Choice Awards "Group Arts/Entertainer of the Year". Individual members have won a number of performance awards at music festivals through the years; some as a part of other groups.

== Recordings ==
Shenandoah Bluegrass was the group's first recording. Gary Ruley & Muletrain was released in 2002 with Ruley on guitar and performing lead vocals, Daniel Knicely on mandolin, Larry Keel on guitar, and Jenny Keel on upright bass (all three providing harmony vocals). It also featured Will Lee on banjo, Ann Marie Simpson-Calhoun on fiddle, Jeremiah Ruley, Brennan Gilmore, Mark Shimmick, and Mitchell Davis. Their next recording was Pickin' Tradition also features Ruley, Knicely, and the Keels, but brings in Ronald "Rooster" Ruley on banjo, and Steve Hoke on fiddle. Then came Live at the Troubadour Vol. 1 and Live at the Troubadour Vol. 2 in 2005, recordings made from a live performance at the Troubadour Theater in Lexington, "which served Washington and Lee University as its campus theater for decades." These recordings feature Ruley, Will Lee, the Keels again, but this time with the Simpson sisters—Ann Marie and Mary—adding fiddle and vocals. Most recently they've released a live recording of their 2009 Christmas show titled Southern Inn And Out in 2010. In addition to Ruley, Keel, Lee, and Knicely, it also features brother David Knicely on bass. It also features fiddle player Nate Leath of Old School Freight Train, and Shannon Wheeler (with The Churchmen and The Blinky Moon Boys).

== Musical style ==
Known as one of the finest acoustic flat pickers, Gary Ruley plays mostly vintage Martin guitars. He was born in western Virginia and raised on bluegrass and old-time mountain music. Influences include Bill Monroe, Flatt & Scruggs, Don Reno and Red Smiley, and the Beatles.

. . even if the programs from these two volumes of live recordings mix bluegrass standards with the likes of Ellington, Grisman, and the Beatles, they are all delivered with drive and precision, while the vocals project an informal geniality."

— review of Live at the Troubadour, Volumes One & Two, Bluegrass Unlimited

== Distinctions, honors, and awards ==
- 2010 winners of the Rockbridge County, Virginia Chamber of Commerce Rockbridge Community People's Choice Awards "Group Arts/Entertainer of the Year".
- Ann Marie Calhoun was the winner of the "My Grammy Moment" contest at the 50th Grammy Awards on February 10, 2008, playing live with the Foo Fighters during the broadcast.
- In 2006 Brennan Gilmore won the prestigious Secretary of State's Award for Public Outreach from the U.S. State Department for "ground-breaking efforts to engage non-traditional audiences and promote Arab-American cultural understanding through music" after founding Kantara—a musical group that creates an "alchemy of Appalachian old-time and bluegrass and North African melodies and rhythms"—and touring the world with it.
- The Pat Ruley Trophy for Best All Around Blue Grass Performer at the Maury River Fiddler's Convention —which held its 17th annual event in 2010 in Buena Vista, Virginia—was named for Gary's father and has been won by members of his group: Will Lee won the trophy in 2008 and Mary Simpson in 2005.
- In the past half-decade members of Gary Ruley and Mule Train have won numerous performance awards at the Maury River Fiddler's Convention including first place finishes for Will Lee on guitar in 2005, 2007, and 2008, and for Mary Simpson on bluegrass fiddle in 2005. Second place awards have gone to Nate Leath for old-time fiddle in 2010, to Danny Knicely for bluegrass fiddle in 2007 and 2009, and to Will Lee for guitar in 2006.
- Will Lee's father joined the legendary Stanley Brothers as lead guitarist after playing with Bluegrass Tar Heels, special protégées of Bill Monroe. On his mother's side, Grandpa Clark was a fine ragtime pianist whose two sons both play guitar, while William Penmon Lee, the grandfather he was named after, was a respected clawhammer banjo player in Alabama and Mississippi.
- Danny Knicely's grandfather, A. O. Knicely, played old time guitar, mandolin, and fiddle as leader of the Knicely Family Band. His father played bass and banjo in A.O.K.'s band; he also led his own country and bluegrass band, Dominion Express. Danny's mother had two groups: Heartland, a country and gospel band, as well as a large dance troupe, the Massanutten Mountain Cloggers.
- Magraw Gap, a band comprising Will Lee, Larry Keel, and Danny Knicely, took first place at the Telluride Bluegrass Festival in 1995.

== Personnel ==
- Gary Ruley—vocals/guitar
- Ronald "Rooster" Ruley—banjo
- Jeremiah Ruley—banjo
- Daniel Knicely—mandolin/vocals
- David Knicely— bass
- Larry Keel guitar/mandolin/vocals
- Jenny Keel— bass/vocals
- Ann Marie Calhoun (née Simpson)—fiddle/vocals
- Mary Simpson—fiddle/vocals
- Brennan Gilmore—mandolin/vocals
- Will Lee—banjo/vocals
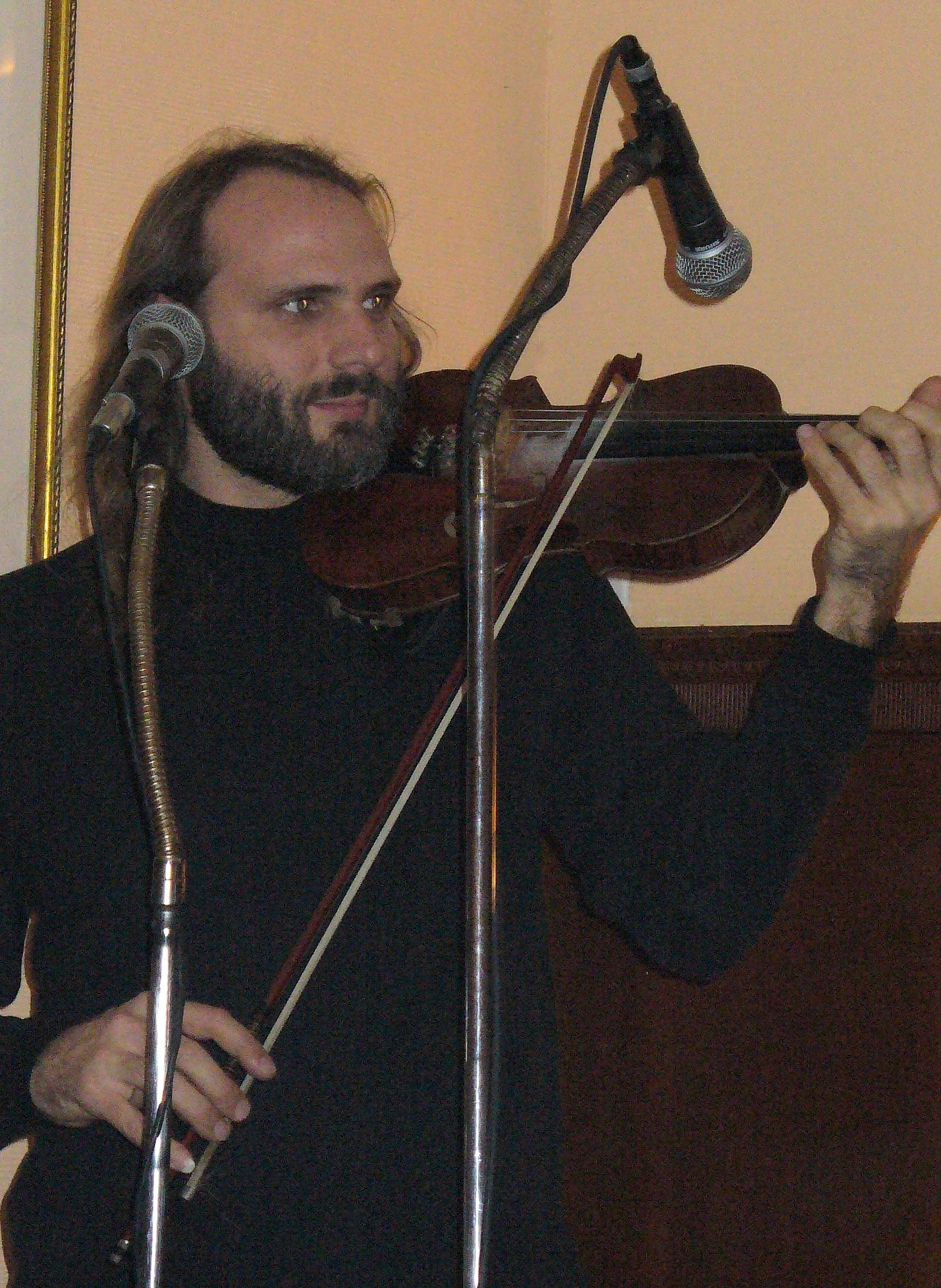
Danny Knicely on violin, playing with Gary Ruley and Mule Train at The Southern Inn in Lexington, Virginia, Christmas 2008

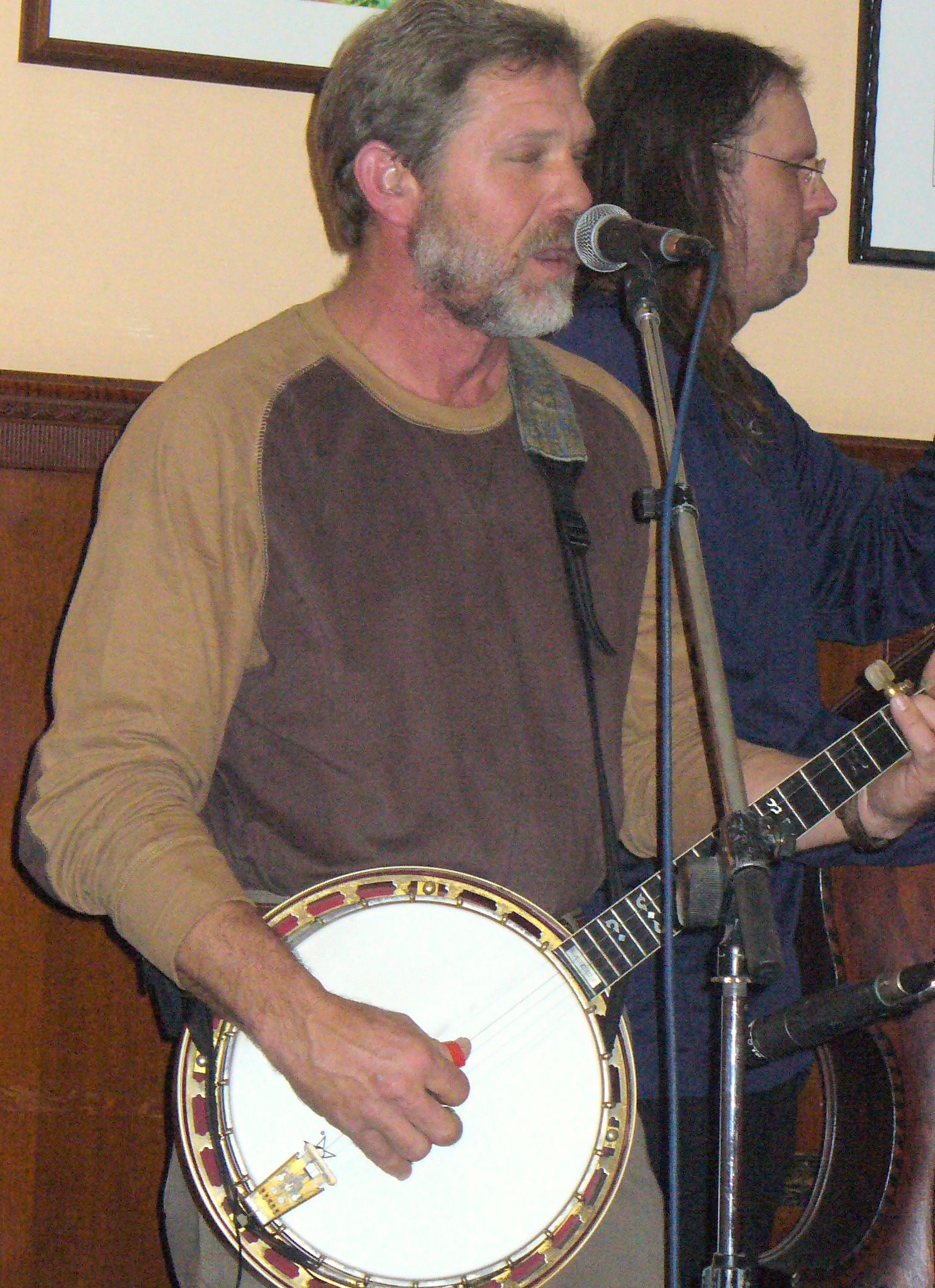
Will Lee on banjo, David Knicely on bass, playing with Gary Ruley and Mule Train at The Southern Inn in Lexington, Virginia, Christmas 2008

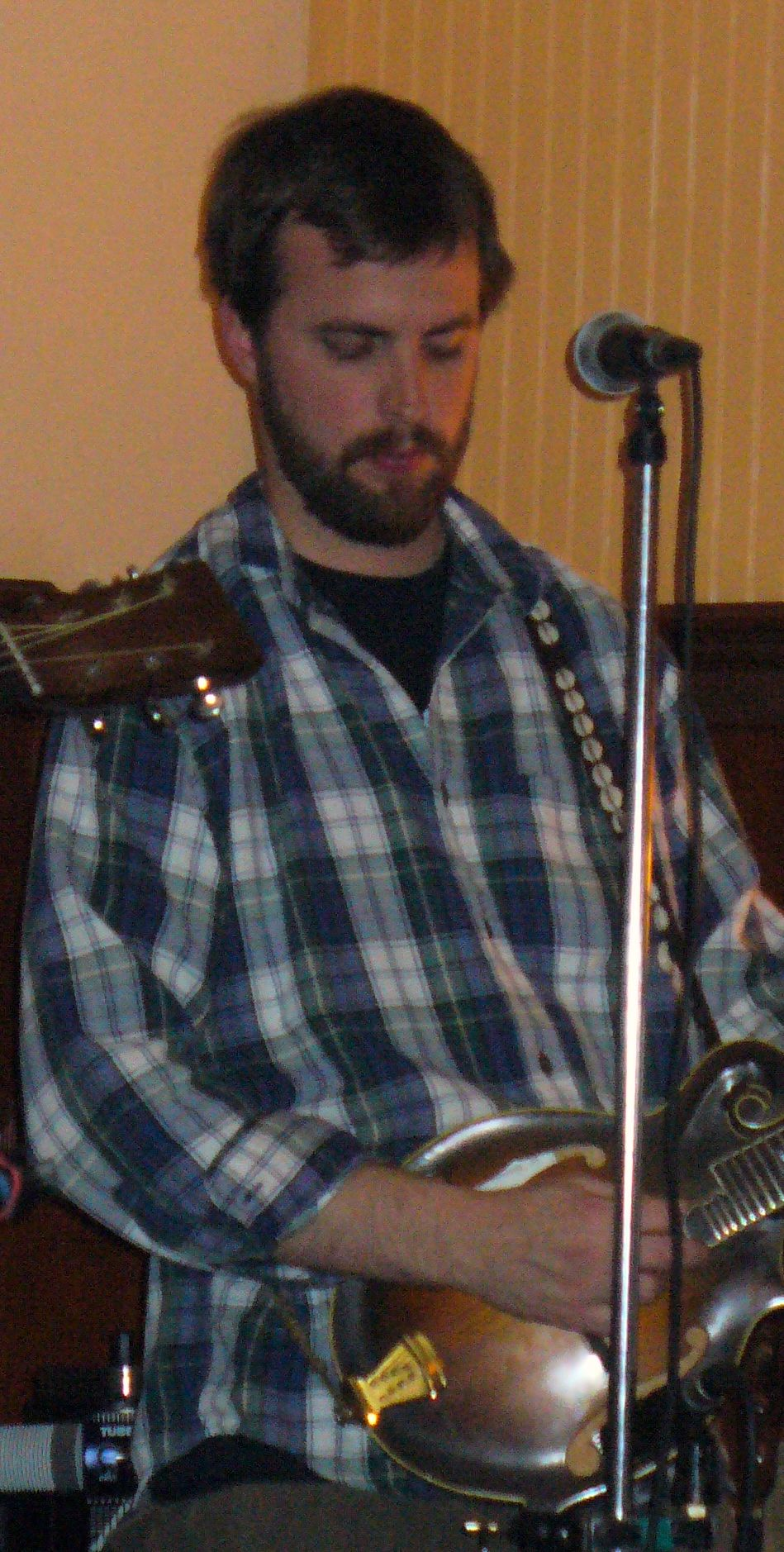
Brennan Gilmore on mandolin, playing with Gary Ruley and Mule Train at The Southern Inn in Lexington, Virginia, Christmas 2008

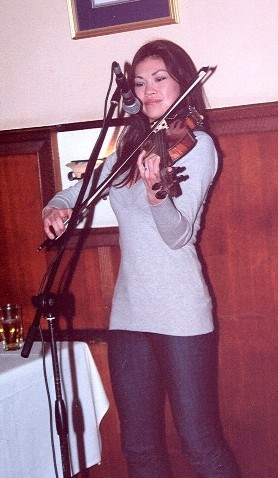
Ann Marie Calhoun on violin, playing with Gary Ruley and Mule Train at The Southern Inn in Lexington, Virginia, Thanksgiving 2008

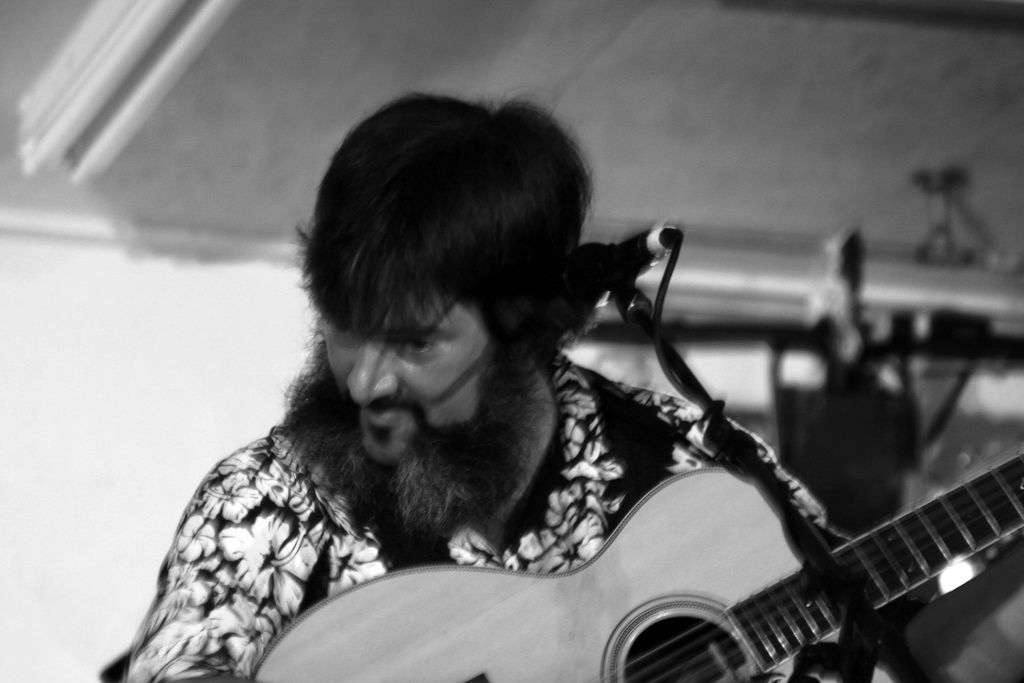
Larry Keel June 6, 2007

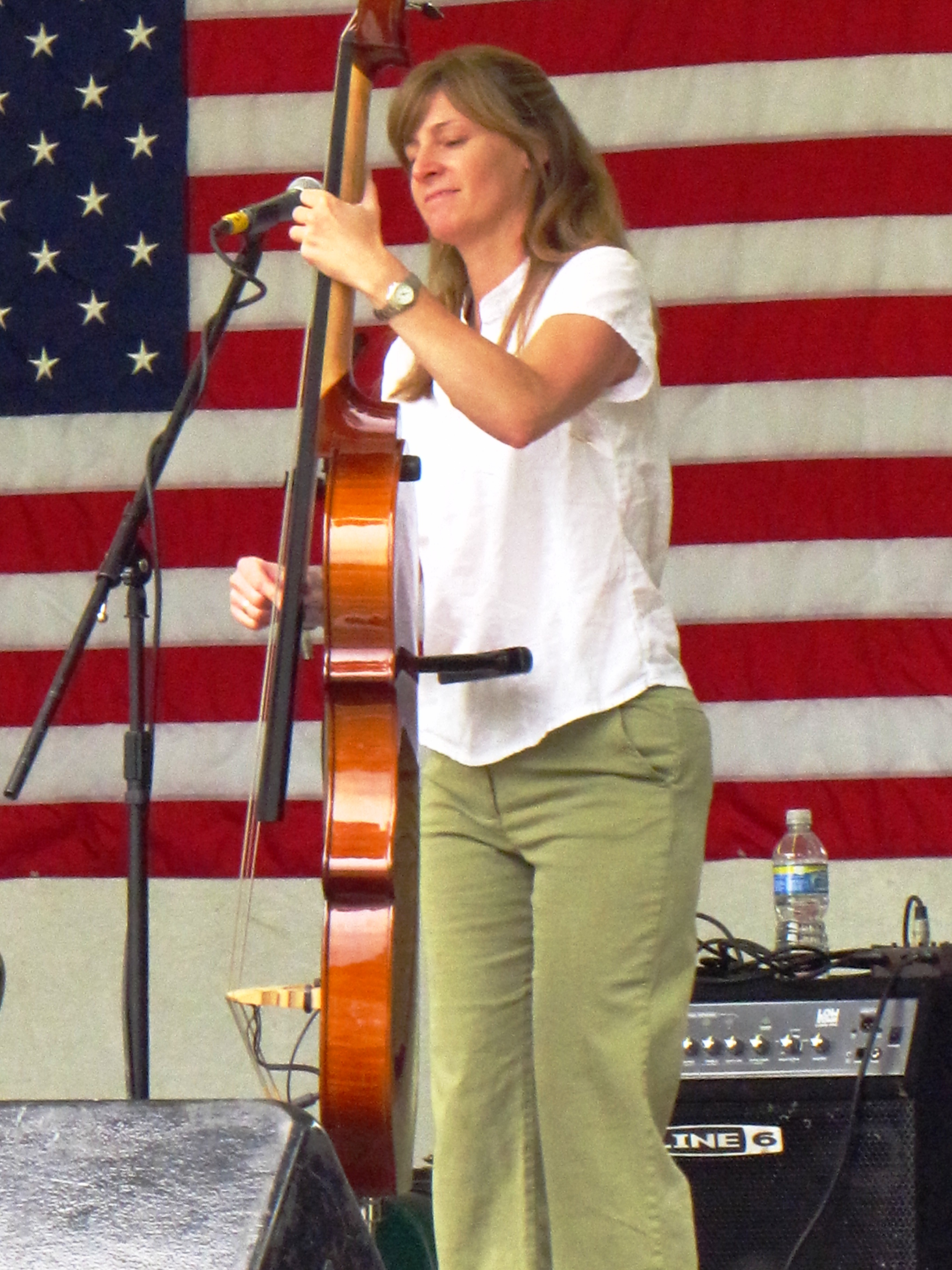
Jenny Keel plays bass at Appalachian Uprising in Scottown, Ohio on June 5, 2009.

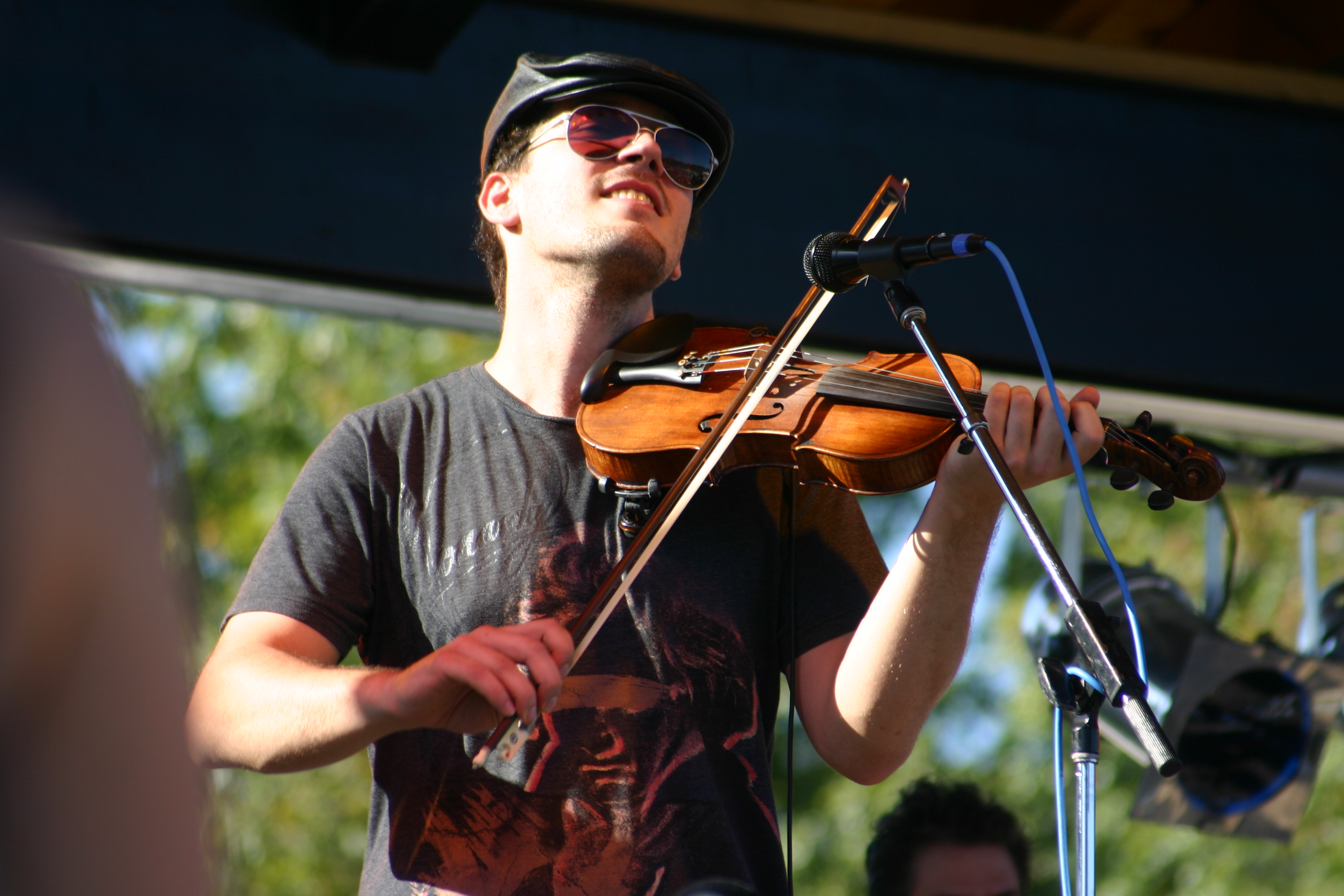
Nate Leath on fiddle with Old School Freight Train at The Festy music festival in Nelson County, Virginia October 9, 2010.

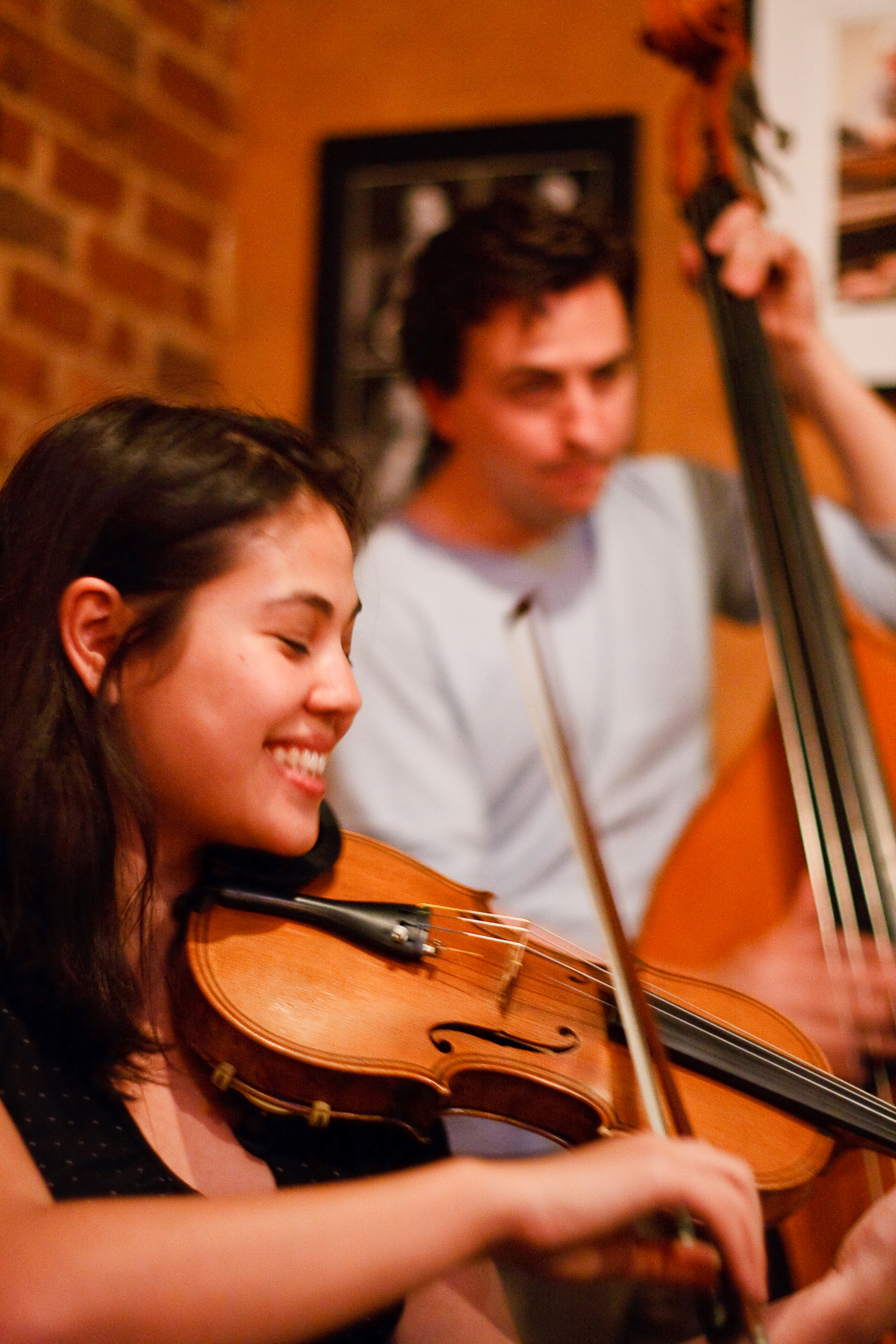
Mary Simpson on fiddle with Whiskey Rebellion at Fellini's in Charlottesville, Virginia, April 20, 2009.

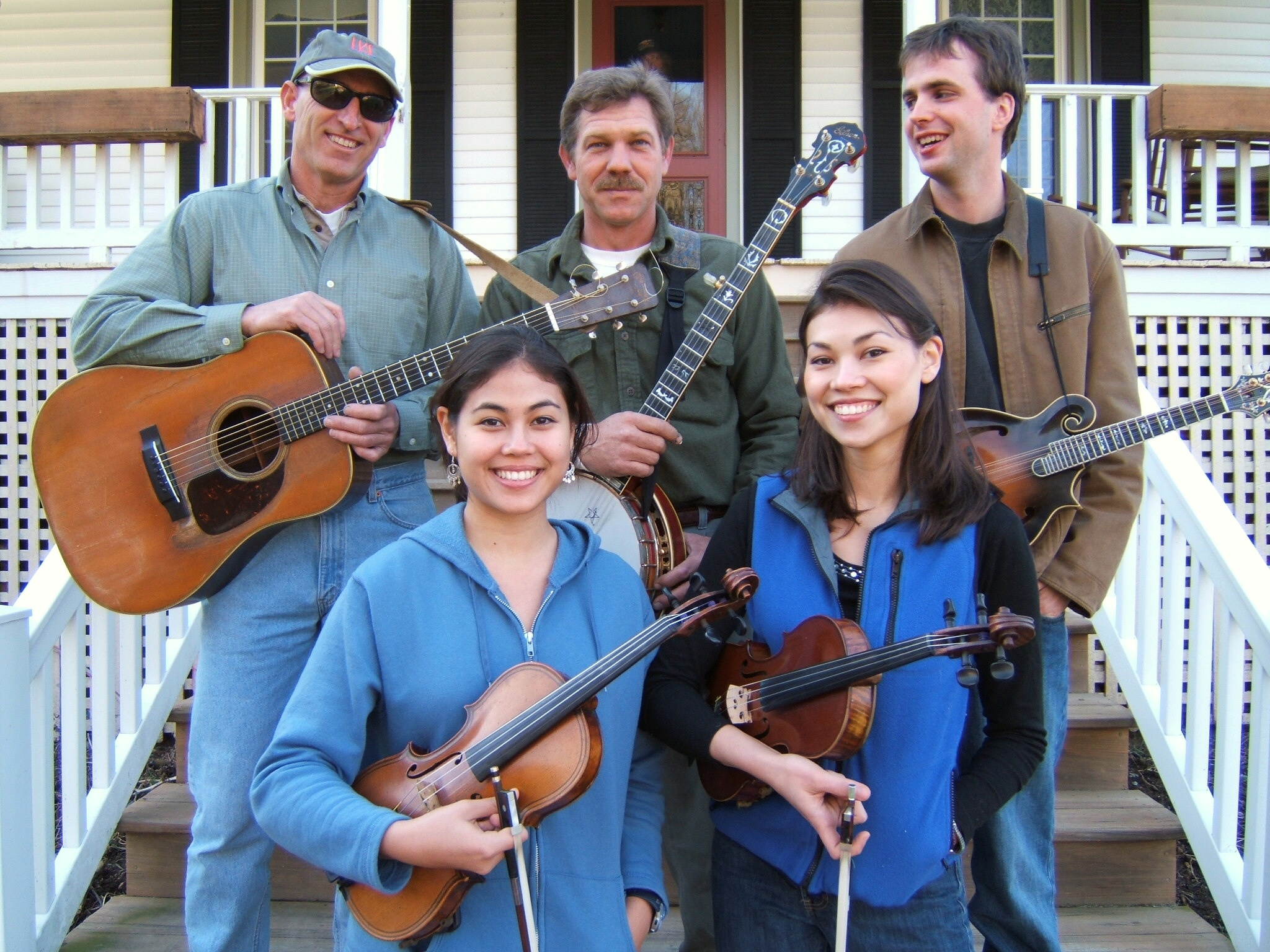
Gary Ruley and Mule Train on January 16, 2005 -- (top) Gary Ruley, Will Lee, Brennan Gilmore mandolin; (bottom) Mary Simpson, Ann Marie Calhoun.

== Discography ==
- Shenandoah Bluegrass
- Gary Ruley & Muletrain (2002)
- Pickin' Tradition
- Live at the Troubadour Vol. 1 (2005)
- Live at the Troubadour Vol. 2 (2005)
- Southern Inn And Out (2010)

== Video ==
- Orange Blossom Special published January 31, 2008: Gary Ruley and Mule Train play "Orange Blossom Special" with twin fiddles. Features Gary Ruley, Ann Marie Calhoun, Brennan Gilmore, Danny Knicely, and Will Lee.
- Mule Skinner Blues published January 28, 2008: Gary Ruley pickin' and a grinnin' Mule Skinner Blues with his flat-top guitar, playing it in the Virginia bluegrass style.
- East Virginia Blues published January 28, 2008: Rockbridge County bluegrass at its best, featuring Gary Ruley, Brennan Gilmore, Will Lee, Ann Marie Calhoun, and David Knicely.
- Great Balls of Fire published March 14, 2008: New song for the bluegrass repertoire of Gary Ruley and Mule Train, featuring Gary Ruley (guitar), Will Lee (banjo), Brennan Gilmore (mandolin), David Knicely (bass), and Mary Simpson (fiddle) at Queen City Brewery, Staunton, Virginia.
- Ruley's Side Show Circuit with Ann Marie Calhoun published March 10, 2008: Gary Ruley plays the Downtown Lexington Festival 2001 with Ann Marie Calhoun (fiddle), Rooster Ruley (banjo), and Brennan Gilmore (mandolin).

== Reviews, interviews, articles ==
- "'Southern Inn And Out' Offers Musical Magic: Ruley And Mule Train's Latest CD Captures 2009 Christmas Show" by Doug Chase, review, The News-Gazette online edition; November 24, 2010.
- "Gary Ruley & Mule Train Thanksgiving Show at Lexington Golf and Country Club" in rockbridgeweekly.com & The Alleghany Journal; 2010.
- "Live at Troubadour, Volumes One & Two" review in Bluegrass Unlimited October 2006.
- The News-Gazette Lexington, Virginia; Section C, Page 2, November 23, 2005 "Live at Troubadour".
- The News-Gazette Lexington, Virginia; Wednesday, April 9, 2003 Section C, "Muletrain Sparkles".
- The News-Gazette Lexington, Virginia; Wednesday, June 6, 2002, "Three Bands to Play at First Lexington Alive Concert".
- Bluegrass Unlimited April 2000, page 92, review "Pickin' Tradition".
- Daily News Leader Staunton, Virginia; Friday, March 17, 2000, "Ruley Helps Keep Music Heritage Alive".
- The News-Gazette Lexington, Virginia; Wednesday, December 22, 1999; Section C, Page 4 "Bluegrass CD A Delightful Menagerie".

== See also ==
- Bluegrass music
- Old-time music
- Ann Marie Calhoun
- Lexington, Virginia
- Rockingham County, Virginia
