= Larry Keel =

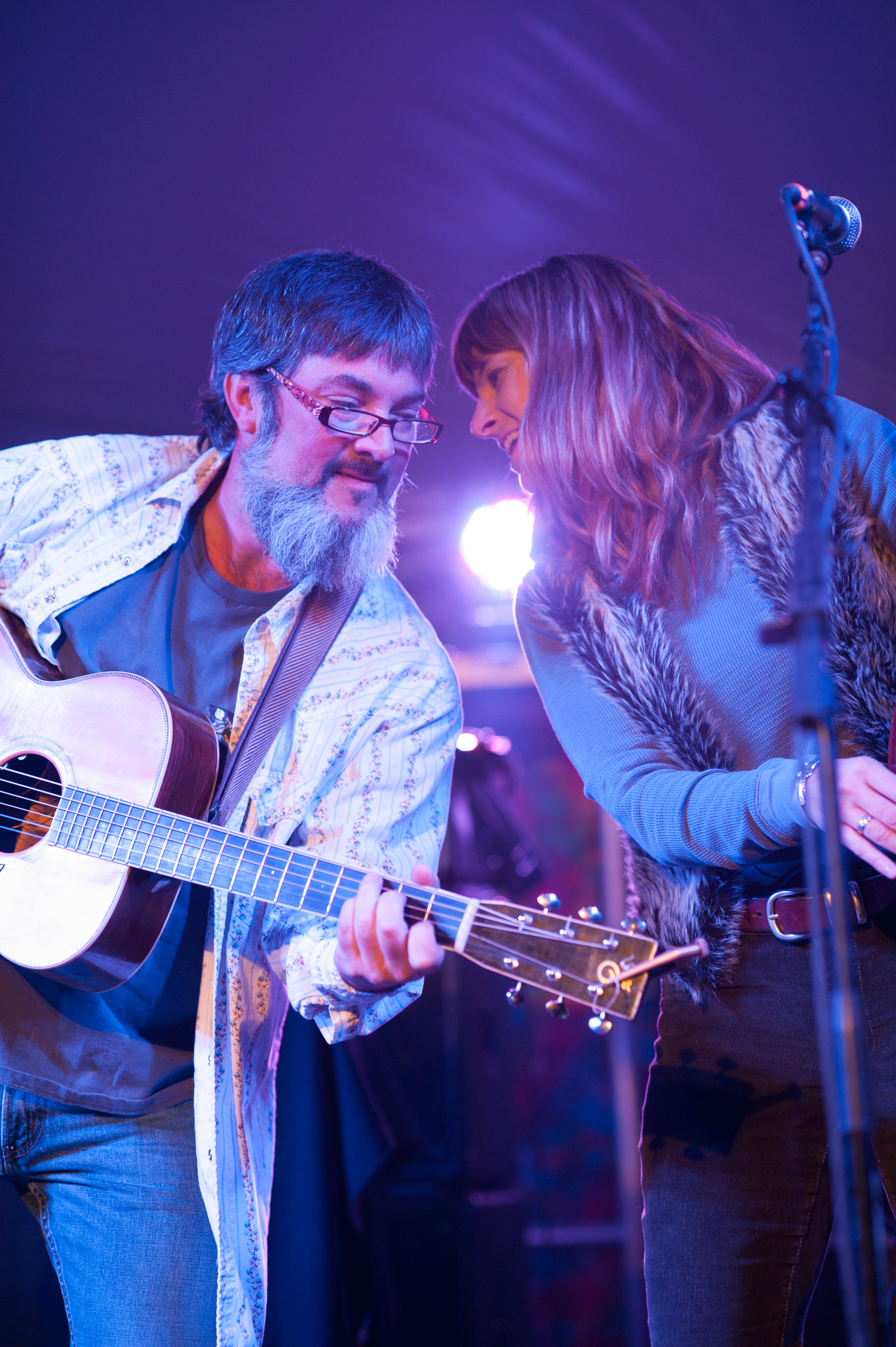
- Keel with Jenny Keel on bass, Greenville, Virginia, 2012

Background information
- Born: November 25, 1968 (age 57); Manassas, Virginia
- Origin: Rockbridge County, Virginia
- Genres: Progressive bluegrass, Acoustic rock, Progressive country
- Occupations: musician, guitarist, singer, songwriter
- Instrument: guitar
- Years active: 1975–present
- Label: Keel Fish Music (BMI)
- Website: larrykeel.com

Larry Dwayne Keel (born November 25, 1968) is an American progressive bluegrass musician and singer/songwriter from Southwest Virginia. He was a founding member of Magraw Gap in 1990. He has also performed with his wife, bassist Jenny Keel, in The Larry Keel Experience, The Larry Keel Duo, and with Keller Williams in Keller and The Keels. He has released over a dozen albums.

== Early life ==
Larry Keel was born in Manassas, Virginia in 1968. He was taught guitar by his father James Keel, who played banjo. His brother Gary, who played guitar — and was twelve years older – bought him one when he was seven. He began playing seriously in 1975. Between 1976 and 1985 he performed bluegrass music in a number of "semi-professional situations", e.g., bluegrass and fiddler conventions, community events, barbecues, etc.

In 1986 was hired by Disney as a contract musician to perform at Tokyo Disneyland when he was 18. Returning to the United States, he met bluegrass musicians John Flower and Mark Vann in Fauquier County, Virginia in 1989 and together they began exploring "progressive string music" in a band they formed named Farmer's Trust. In 1990, Mark Vann (1963–2002) moved to Telluride, Colorado to help found the "Cajun-influenced jam band" Leftover Salmon.

== Career ==
In 1990, Keel and his long-time friend Will Lee – son of guitarist Ricky Lee from Ralph Stanley's band in the 1970s – founded a "progressive string band" named Magraw Gap. Through 1993 the group traveled throughout the Shenandoah Valley competing in bluegrass competitions. In 1993, Keel entered the guitar competition at Telluride Bluegrass Festival and won first place. In 1994, Magraw Gap began touring regularly. Keel won the guitar competition again in 1996.

Keel met Jennifer Newmark when she came to see Gary Ruley play in March 1994. When Keel got up on stage with Gary to pick a tune," she was "blown away" by his musicianship, particularly by their take on the David Grisman tune "Eat My Dust". Although Jenny played piano by ear and sang, had never played a stringed instrument before she met Keel. She got together with Keel, and quickly began learning the bass.

In September 1996, Keel split with Magraw Gap and formed the Larry Keel Experience, made up of himself on guitar, Jenny on bass, and other musicians he'd worked with over the years. Over the next several years the group recorded a number of albums.

In January 2005, Keel created a new band, Larry Keel & Natural Bridge — consisting of himself on guitar, Jenny on bass, Mark Schimick on mandolin, and Will Lee on banjo. They have toured and recorded extensively.

== Recordings ==
Starting in 1996, when Keller Williams recorded Buzz with Magraw Gap as supporting musicians – and the group released their self-titled CD – Keel has been active recordings. The Larry Keel Experience's 1997 CD Miles & Miles featured 20 special guests. In 1998, Keel worked with Curtis Burch, recent Grammy Award-winner for The Great Dobro Sessions.

Larry Keel Experience released Larry Keel, Curtis Burch & the Experience with Billy Constable in 2002. Keel's 2004 Journey CD, recorded at his home in Natural Bridge, included guest artists David VanDeventer, Danny Knicely, Will Lee, Gary Ruley, John Flower, Robert Mabe, Slinky Cobblestone, and Morgan Morrison. In 2009, Larry Keel and Natural Bridge released an almost entirely original Backwoods, co-produced by Keller Williams and mastered by Bill Wolf. The Wounded Messenger noted, "Perhaps no song better encapsulates the group's sound than the constantly shifting "Crocodile Man", which meanders through steep, jazzy terrain often explored by progressive acoustic acts but perfected here."

Larry and Jenny Keel's second album with Keller Williams, performing as Keller and the Keels, Thief went No. 1 on Billboard Charts and stayed there for several weeks in a row.

== Touring ==
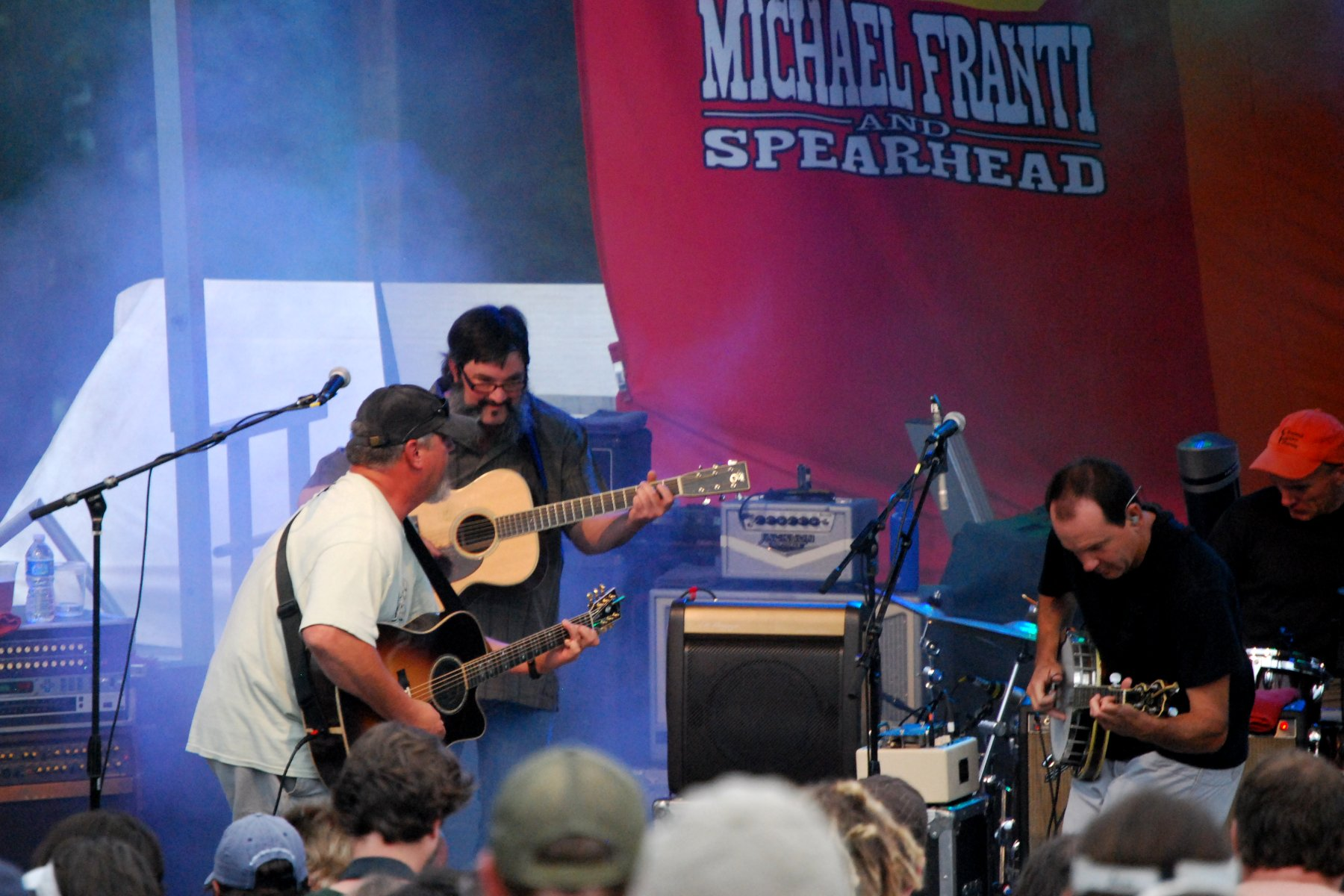
With Acoustic Syndicate at Smilefest, 2010

Larry Keel tours actively with one of his many musical act combos, and with other musical acts – making appearances at major festivals across the US. In 2002, Larry Keel Experience played numerous shows with Vassar Clements and Tony Rice, including at Suwannee Springfest and MerleFest. In 2008, Larry Keel and Natural Bridge toured and collaborated with Rice, Yonder Mountain String Band, Fred Tackett, Paul Barerre, Keller Williams, Hot Tuna, and Davisson Brothers Band. In the winter of 2009, Keel joined Adam Aijala of Yonder Mountain String Band on a tour of Washington, Oregon, and Northern California.

Keller and the Keels performed on Jam Cruise 10 in the Caribbean in 2012. Larry Keel and Natural Bridge performed on Steep Canyon Rangers' "Mountain Song at Sea" cruise in the Bahamas in 2013. Larry and Jenny Keel collaborated with Jeff Austin of Yonder Mountain String Band and Danny Barnes on tours throughout the US, including two appearances on the Mumford & Sons "Gentlemen of the Road" tour in Ohio and Oklahoma in 2013.

In 2013, Larry and Jenny Keel appeared as the opening act at The String Cheese Incident's "Hulaween" festival in Live Oak, Florida. In 2014, The Keels appeared at the Lockn' Festival with New Grass Revival founder, Sam Bush. That same year, the Larry Keel Experience played a sold-out show at the "Bluegrass Underground" concert series in a cave in 33 feet below McMinnville, Tennessee.

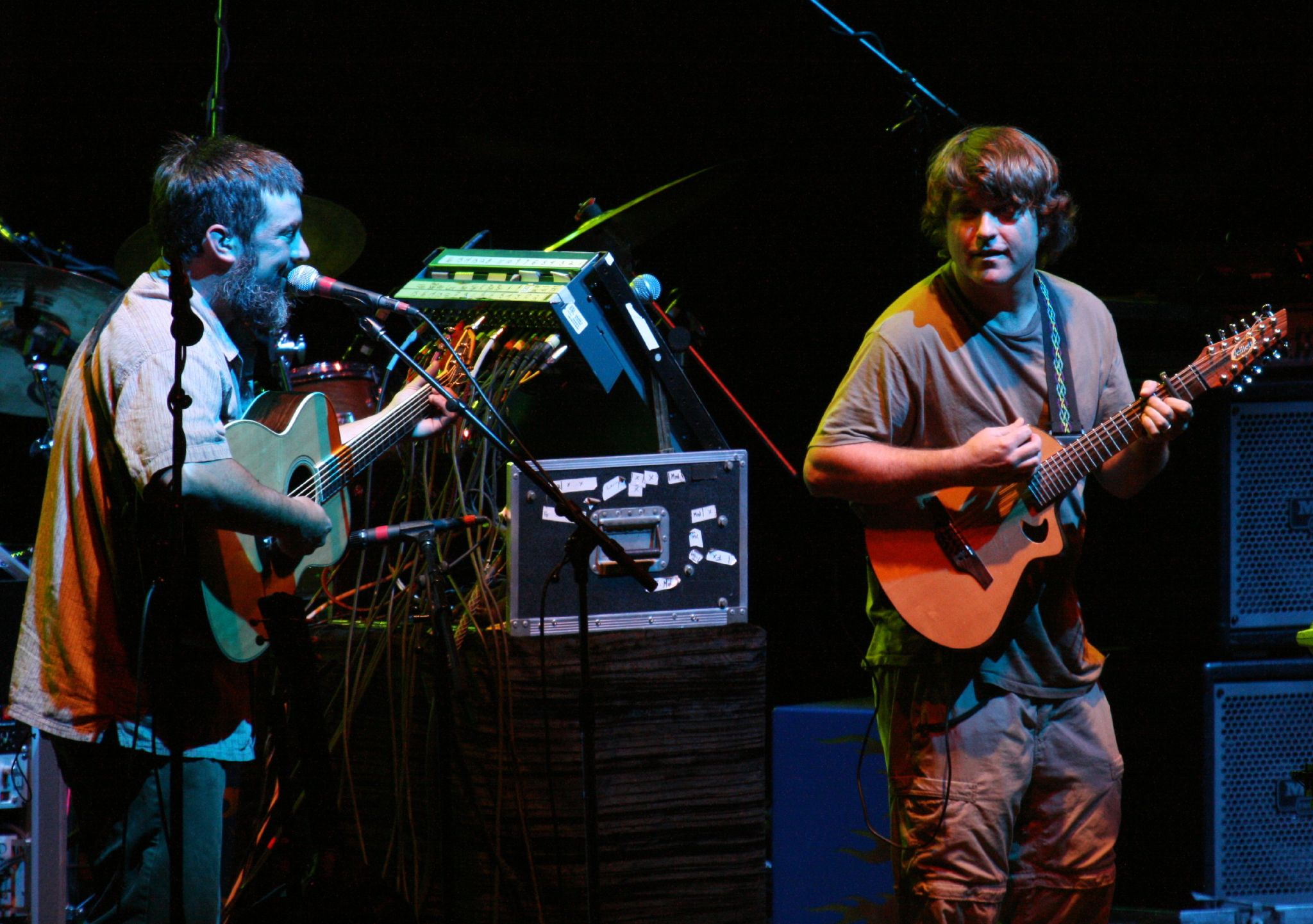
With Keller Williams at All Good Music Festival July 13, 2007.

Larry Keel Experience hosted a 2014 New Year's Eve show at the Oskar Blues Brewery in Brevard, North Carolina. Major acts involved in the show included the Jon Stickley Trio, Jeremy Garrett and Travis Book of the Infamous Stringdusters, Steve McMurry of Acoustic Syndicate, and Mike Guggino of Steep Canyon Rangers.

In July 2015, Keller and the Keels toured through the Deep South with Dangermuffin. Keel also performed in collaboration with Darol Anger, Sam Grisman, and Scott Law that year, adding three sets at FloydFest in Virginia.

== Discography ==
- Magraw Gap (1996) — Magraw Gap
- Miles and Miles (1997) — Larry Keel Experience
- The Sound (1998) — Larry Keel
- Larry Keel (2000) — Larry Keel
- Larry Keel, Curtis Burch, and The Experience (2002)
- Journey (2004) — Larry Keel
- The Keel Brothers, Vol. 1 (2005) — The Keel Brothers
- Larry Keel & Natural Bridge (2005) — Larry Keel & Natural Bridge
- Grass (2006) — Keller and The Keels
- Keel Brothers, Vol. 2 (2006) — The Keel Brothers
- Backwoods (2009) — Larry Keel & Natural Bridge
- Thief (2010) — Keller & The Keels
- Classic (2012) — Larry Keel & Natural Bridge
- Experienced (2016) — Larry Keel
- One (2019) — Larry Keel
- Speed (2019) — Keller and The Keels
- American Dream (2020) — Larry Keel
- Larry Keel & Jon Stickley (2025) — Larry Keel & Jon Stickley

== Musical style ==
In 2013, NPR noted, "Keel leads a band dedicated to taking fiery, authentic bluegrass around the world." Brian Paul Swank from Bluegrass Today said in 2016, "Larry is a unique artist in that he never settled as just being a guitar wizard, as so many young virtuosos do, but instead, he created his musical identity through his own personal vision".

== Honors, awards, distinctions ==
- Keel won the flatpicking guitar competition at Telluride Bluegrass Festival in 1993 and 1996.
- Flatpicking Guitar Magazine released their "Best of 2001" CD including Larry Keel's original instrumental, "Jerry's Farewell".
- Flatpicking Guitar Magazine released their "Doc Fest" CD in April 2002, a tribute to guitar legend Doc Watson, including a Larry Keel duet with cellist Rushad Eggleston, "Matty Groves".
- Keel appeared on the cover of Flatpicking Guitar Magazine May/June 2004 issue (with a 5-page feature article).
- In 2009, Keel debuted in his first acting role in independent film, John Lee: The Man They Could Not Hang, playing a jail warden in late 19th century England. His music was also featured on the soundtrack.
- In 2011, Will Lee's tune "Sound Check", performed by Larry Keel Experience, was featured on Confluence Films movie Connect.
- In 2013, Keel's tune "Fishin' Reel" was featured as soundtrack to the Alaskan pike-fishing segment in Confluence Films movie Waypoints.

== Personal ==
Keel is married to his bassist, Jennifer "Jenny" (née Newmark) Keel. He has a passion for fishing and has developed a number of related enterprises, including a website dedicated to sport fishing and bluegrass called Fishinandpickin.com and retreat workshops that combine these two interests.
