= Shiah Coore =

Jamaican musical artist and producer

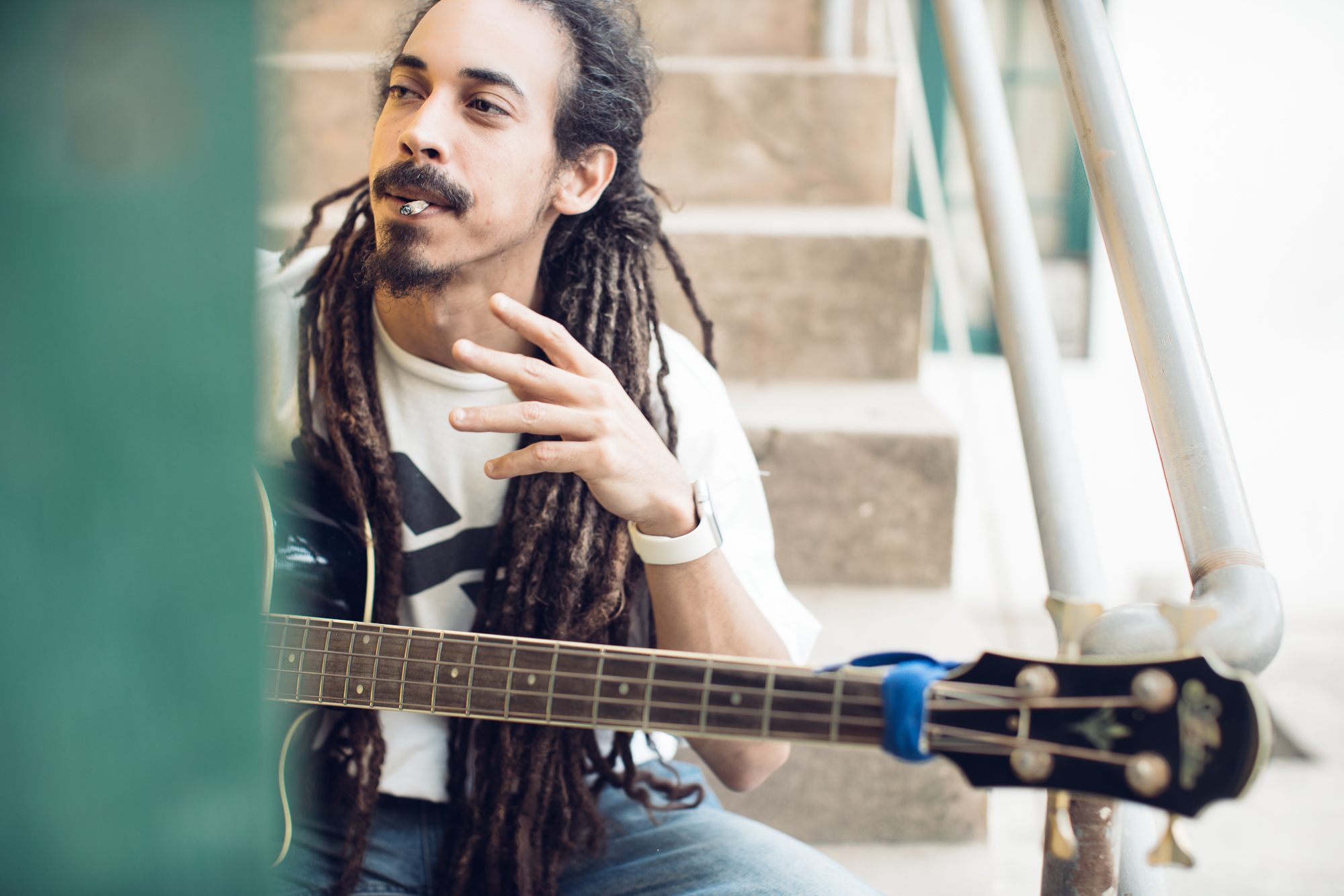

Background information
- Born: 20 August 1979 (age 47); Kingston, Jamaica
- Genres: Dancehall, reggae
- Label: Shiah Records

Shiah Coore (born 20 August 1979) is a Jamaican musician and record producer. He was born in Kingston, Jamaica.

== Biography ==
Shiah Coore, firstborn to musician Cat Coore (Third World) and artisan Donna Feltis-Coore (Ital Craft), was born in Kingston Jamaica, 1979. As one of a handful of children belonging to the island's reggae-elite, Shiah Coore was raised in the music industry. He showed interest for music early in life, performing living room shows with Damian Marley at the age of six. The Shepherds was later developed by Donna Feltis-Coore after she put an advertisement in the newspaper to find other members and named the band. The members of the band were Shiah Coore's lifelong friend Damian Marley, Yashema Beth McGregor, daughter of Freddie McGregor and Judy Mowatt, Richard Bertrand and Noel Parks, son of Lloyd Parks. They would later perform together at Sunsplash 1991.

Coore later attended the Jamaica School of Music, playing bass guitar under the instruction of Maurice Gordon. Then Coore submitted an audition tape featuring his best scales and patterns to the Berklee College of Music in Boston, Massachusetts, United States, and in late 1999 entered on a scholarship. Here he furthered his bass studies with Rich Appleman and Danny Morris, and also began to explore music production and engineering. To date, his bass tones can be heard on album recordings with NAS, Joss Stone, AR Rahman, Third World, Mick Jagger, Chronixx, Eric Clapton, Dave Stewart, Damian and Stephen Marley or on the SuperHeavy project. Since 2003, he is touring as a bass player with Damian Marley.

As a producer, Coore is the creator of 'Mad Ants Riddim', other notable work include contributions to Sizzla's Rise to the Occasion, Wayne Wonder's No Holding Back, Damian Marley's Welcome To JamRock (Grammy Award winner), Nas and Damian Marley's Distant Relatives (2010). As well as tracks for Vybz Kartel, Busy Signal, Chronixx, Sizzla, Beenie Man, and Bounty Killa. Coore launched his own record label, Shiah Records, in 2012.

== Discography ==
=== Musician ===
Year	Artist	Title or Album	Credits
2015	Vetta	"Journey Begins"	Bass
2014	Alaine	"Ten of Hearts"	Bass
2014	Duane Stephenson	"Dangerously Roots : Journey from August Town"	Bass
2014	Jah Vinci	"Ghetto Born"	Bass
2014	Lutan Fyah	"Get Rid a di Wicked"	Bass
2014	Lutan Fyah	"Life of a King"	Composer and Bass
2013	Eric Clapton	"Every Little Thing"	Bass
2012	Sizzla	"In Gambia"	Composer and Bass
2011	SuperHeavy	"SuperHeavy"	Bass
2011	Third World	"Patriots"	Composer and Bass
2010	Nas and Damian Marley	Distant Relatives	Bass, Drums, Vocals (Background), Handclapping
2010	Sizzla	"Crucial Times"	Bass
2009	K'NAAN	"Troubadour"	Bass
2008	Various Artists	"Caribbean Fever"	Composer
2007	Javaughn	"Superstar"	Bass
2006	Damian Marley	"All Night"	Bass and Keyboards
2005	Damian Marley	Welcome to Jamrock	Drum Programming, Keyboards, Bass
2005	Sizzla	"Souldeep"	Bass
2004	Vybz Kartel	"Move Up to Di Time"	Composer and Bass
2003	Sizzla	Rise to the Occasion	Composer, Bass and Keyboards
2003	Papa San	"God and I"	Composer
2003	Elephant Man and Wayne Wonder	"Crazy Feeling"	Composer
2003	Wayne Wonder	"No Holding Back"	Keyboards

=== Producer and composer ===
Year	Artist	Title or Album	Credits
2016	Various Artists	Lion Paw Riddim	Producer and Composer
2015	Lutan Fyah	Mash it Up	Producer and Composer
2015	Richie Stephens	Love at First Touch	Producer and Composer
2015	Busy Signal	Gal Yuh Good	Producer
2014	Jah Vinci	Touch It	Producer and Composer
2014	Jah Vinci	Be Strong	Producer
2012	Jah Vinci	Wah Money	Producer
2009	Various Artists	Black Velvet Riddim	Producer and Composer
2009	Various Artists	Classic Rhythms, Vol 1	Composer
2007	Movie Soundtrack	Made in Jamaica	Producer and Composer
2004	Various Artists	Ragga Ragga Ragga 2004	Composer
2003	Various Artists	Jumpa Cable Riddim	Producer and Composer
2002	Various Artists	Mad Ants Riddim	Producer and Composer

== Other sources ==
1. 2009, Oxford University Press, The Encyclopedia of Popular Music, Colin Larkin
2. 2016, Reggae.fr, Damian Marley's interview
3. "Damian Marley, Following in his Fathers Footsteps", Zachary Cichocki
