= Road to Zion =

Single by Damian Marley featuring Nas

from the album Welcome to Jamrock
- Released: 2005
- Length: 5:17
- Label: Tuff Gong/Universal
- Songwriters: Damian Marley, Nasir Jones
- Producer: Stephen Marley

Damian Marley singles chronology
"The Master Has Come Back" (2005)	"Road to Zion" (2005)	"Beautiful" (2006)

Nas singles chronology
"In Public" (2005)	"Road to Zion" (2005)	"Hip Hop Is Dead" (2006)

"Road to Zion" was the 2nd US single to be taken from Damian Marley's Welcome to Jamrock, while "The Master Has Come Back" was released in Europe.

It contains a sample from "Russian Lullaby" by Ella Fitzgerald.

The song also inspired Nas and Damian Marley to record an EP together, which later turned into the full-length album Distant Relatives released in 2010.

== Music video ==
The video was filmed in Kew Gardens and it features cameos from Chali 2na of Jurassic 5 (on the street), George Clinton and Game being locked up with Nas, and Damian handing out postcards with the Lion of Judah on them. After Nas analyzes the card, he manages to escape the prison he’s in and reunite with the young Marley back in a project hallway.

== Certifications ==
Region	Certification	Certified units/sales
United Kingdom (BPI)	Silver	200,000^{‡}
^{‡} Sales+streaming figures based on certification alone.
