= Ann Marie Calhoun =

American violinist

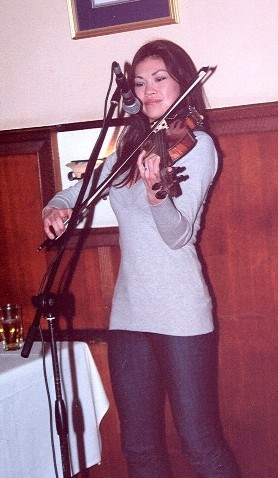

Background information
- Born: Ann Marie Simpson; May 26, 1979 (age 46); Gordonsville, Virginia, U.S.
- Genres: Classical rock; country rock; rock
- Occupation: Violinist
- Years active: 1994–present
- Website: mixhalo.com

Ann Marie Calhoun (née Simpson; born May 26, 1979) is an American classically trained violinist who has performed as a bluegrass and rock musician in a number of prominent acts, including Jethro Tull, Steve Vai, Widespread Panic, Dave Matthews Band, Ringo Starr, A.R. Rahman and Mick Jagger's SuperHeavy. She has closely collaborated with Hans Zimmer on numerous film scores, including Sherlock Holmes, Interstellar, 12 Years a Slave, The Lone Ranger, The Little Prince, Man of Steel, and Captain Phillips. She is the sister of violinist Mary Simpson.

== Early life ==
Calhoun was born on May 26, 1979 in Virginia to a "hillbilly dad", a "documented descendant of Pocahontas", who plays banjo and a "Chinese mom", who was a classically trained pianist. Her brothers play guitar and her sister, Mary Simpson, is an accomplished bluegrass fiddler.

== Music training ==
Simpson began taking violin lessons at the age of three. As she says: "I actually don't remember learning how to play, because I started when I was three. I feel like I've always known." The first hint of her talent came at the age of four when Simpson and her father were watching a Washington Redskins game on television. After their marching band played "Hail to the Redskins", he suddenly heard it again, only this time on the violin. "She picked it up through her ears, and it came out through her fingers instantly. I knew she had a gift then." Simpson began playing bluegrass music with her siblings in the Simpson Family Band. As her father states: "When she was 14, I started taking her to the fiddle contests, and she won just about every one."

"My mother, a classically trained pianist, signed me up for violin lessons. My father, a bluegrass banjo player, couldn't wait for me to learn some fiddle tunes. After I learned my first minuet, my father taught me how to play 'Turkey in the Straw.' I delighted in the contrast of musical styles, and I began supplementing my formal training in the classical violin with fiddle lessons from my father."

— Ann Marie Simpson

Simpson attended Lake Braddock High School in Burke, Virginia, close to Washington, D.C. As a teenager, she was a youth fellow with the National Symphony Orchestra, a program that took her weekly to the Kennedy Center and provided private lessons with the National Symphony Orchestra's violinist, William Haroutounian.

Simpson attended the University of Virginia where she double-majored in Music and Biology, graduating in the class of 2001. While studying there she shared her bluegrass fiddle talents with Walker's Run in Charlottesville, Virginia. From 2001 to 2003, she was part of the bluegrass fusion ensemble Old School Freight Train. She also takes part in Gary Ruley and Mule Train with other members of Walker's Run.

Before dedicating herself completely to her musical career, Simpson taught science and directed the strings program at Woodberry Forest School, in Madison County, Virginia. She is "taking a leave from this school to pursue music."

== Career ==
"She faced some harrowing musical challenges with determination, focus, confidence and respect, and she always delivered gracefully.... But the most captivating aspect of her playing is how her enchanting personality emanates through her fingertips and into the notes."

— Steve Vai

In 2004, Simpson recorded the violins on the album Stand Up for the Dave Matthews Band. In 2005 she toured Italy with the North African/American band, Kantara, which performed Arab-Appalachian music. In 2006 Simpson was invited to tour with the progressive rock band, Jethro Tull, as a guest soloist. She admitted: "I had to Google 'Ian Anderson' when he first contacted me." Anderson later said of Simpson: "Unlike many of her fiddlin' friends from the classical world, Ann Marie has cultivated considerable improvisational abilities but still retains her music theory and the ability to play set parts and orchestrations."

In 2007, Simpson became a member of Steve Vai's band, String Theories. The band began a world tour in June 2007. Simpson received a gold sales award for her participation in Vai's "Where the Wild Things Are" DVD. Her performance with Vai on "Now We Run", was nominated for a Grammy Award in the category of "Best Instrumental Rock Group Performance". Vai commented about her performance at that event: "She should have been the one who had a full performance on the show, because she would have stunned people."

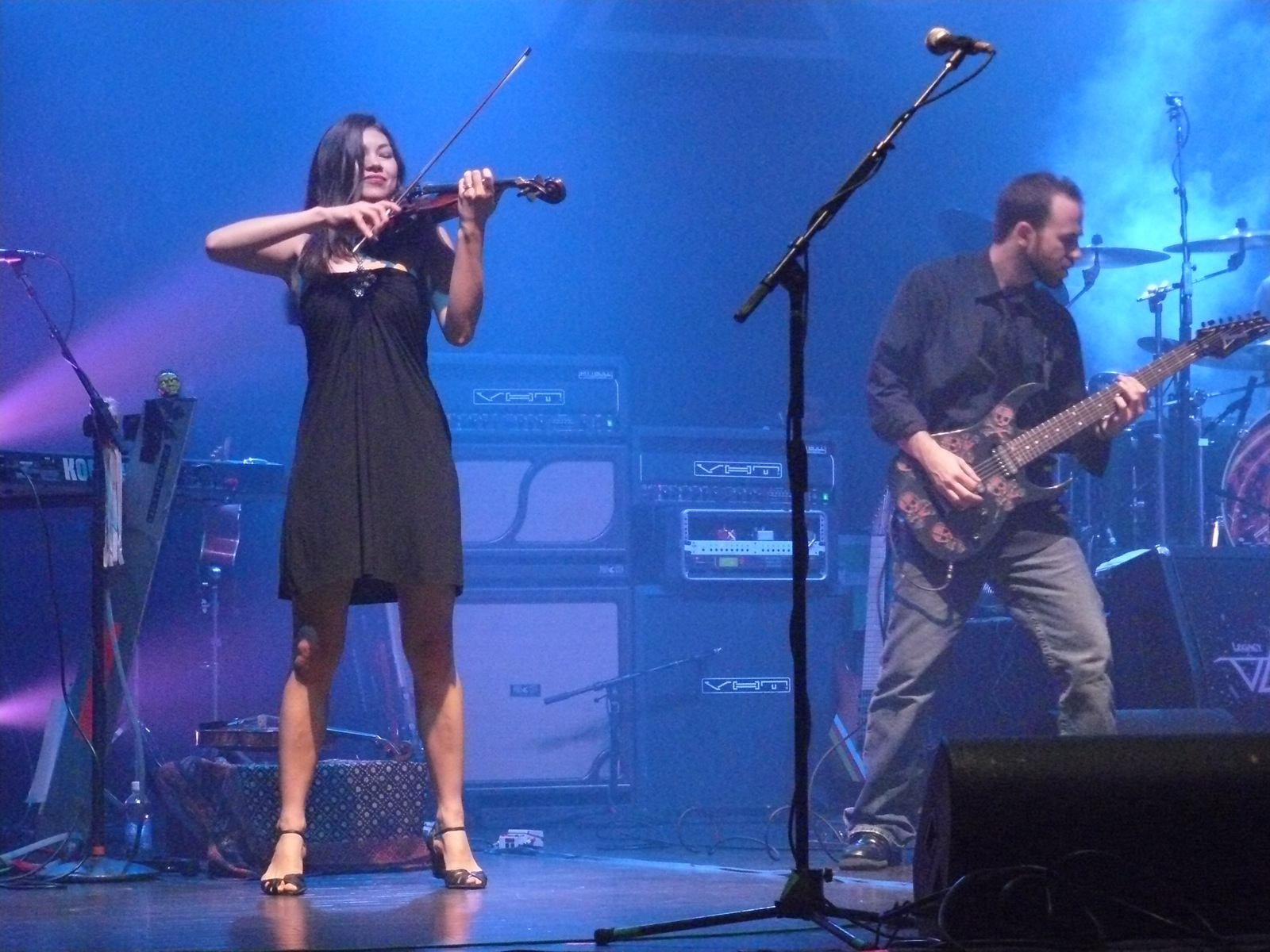
Calhoun appearing with Steve Vai September 2007

At the 50th Grammy Awards on February 10, 2008, Simpson was the winner of the "My Grammy Moment" contest, and played live with the Foo Fighters during the broadcast. In late February 2008, she recorded with The Hooters and played as a special guest with the band the Disco Biscuits. Later that year, Simpson performed multiple times as a special guest with the bands Switchfoot and Widespread Panic, and then performed with Ringo Starr on Larry King Live, The Late Late Show with Craig Ferguson, and at the Los Angeles House of Blues.

2009 saw Simpson perform with the "First Lady of France", Carla Bruni, along with Josh Groban and Aretha Franklin, at Radio City Music Hall to celebrate Mandela Day. Simpson appeared several times with Bon Jovi, including a Christmas performance at the White House for President Barack Obama. Simpson has toured as a featured soloist with Yanni.

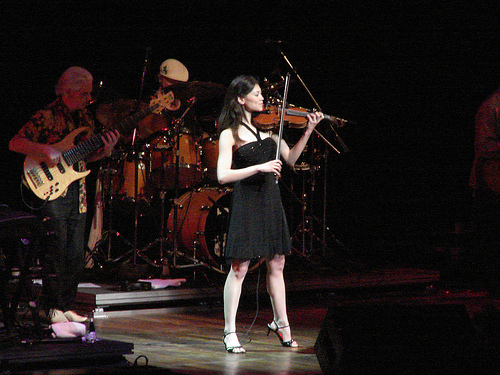
Calhoun in 2007

On January 13, 2010, she performed for Ringo Starr with Ben Harper and the Relentless7 on The Daily Show to promote Starr's new album, Y Not. She again played with them, with the addition of Joan Osborne, on January 14, 2010, for a performance at the Metropolitan Museum of Art, in New York City (which was recorded for the 2010 PBS show, Live from the Artists Den).

Simpson collaborated with Hans Zimmer, as a featured soloist and contributing writer on the film score for the 2009 film Sherlock Holmes, directed by Guy Ritchie. The score was nominated for the 2010 Academy Award for Best Score. She also collaborated with Damian Marley to score the documentary Bouncing Cats, a film that follows one man's efforts to use dance to empower youth in war-torn Uganda. She worked with Dave Stewart (her manager), and co-wrote the theme song for the charity, Stand Up to Cancer.

Simpson orchestrated and conducted an arrangement of "I'll Take It All" for Joss Stone to be used with Activision's James Bond series games.

On May 17, 2010, she premiered as the lead actress, music composer, and official spokesperson for Tim Kring's Conspiracy For Good (also known as "SPIRA").

In 2011, Simpson played with the rock supergroup SuperHeavy with Mick Jagger, Dave Stewart, Joss Stone, A. R. Rahman, and Damian Marley on their debut studio album, Superheavy, and accompanied Stevie Nicks' on the album, "In Your Dreams".

Simpson performed again with Rahman on MTV Unplugged, and appeared with Hans Zimmer, Pharrell Williams, A. R. Rahman and Sheila E. at the 84th Annual Academy Awards in 2012.

Simpson recorded on Stevie Nicks' 2014 album, 24 Karat Gold: Songs from the Vault.

== Personal life ==
She was previously married to Brian Calhoun from 2002–2013. In 2016 she married Incubus guitarist Mike Einziger, with whom she has twin daughters, Talulah and Penelope, born in 2017.

== Recordings ==
- Hans Zimmer, 12 Years a Slave – Original Motion Picture Score (solo violin), 2013.
- Hans Zimmer, Man of Steel – Original Motion Picture Soundtrack (solo violin), 2013.
- Pearl Jam, Lightning Bolt (string arrangements) 2013.
- Dave Stewart, The Blackbird Diaries (violin), 2011.
- Incubus, If Not Now, When? (violin), 2011.
- Stevie Nicks, In Your Dreams (violin, string arrangements), 2011.
- Damian Marley and Nas, Distant Relatives (violin), 2010.
- Ringo Starr, Y Not (violin), 2010.
- Robbie Robertson, How To Become Clairvoyant Violin, 2010.
- Vusi Mahlasela, Say Africa (violin), 2010.
- Pharrell Williams, "Marilyn Monroe" (violin), 2014.
- Steve Vai, Where the Wild Things Are (violin), 2009.
- Joan Osborne, Little Wild One (violin), 2008.
- The Hooters, Both Sides Live (violin, vocals), 2008.
- Dave Stewart, Dave Stewart Songbook, Vol.1 (violin), 2008.
- Jethro Tull, The Best of Acoustic Jethro Tull (violin), 2007.
- Various Artists, The Eclectic Bluegrass Collection (fiddle), 2006.
- Gary Ruley and Mule Train, Live at the Troubadour, Volume I(fiddle), 2005.
- Gary Ruley and Mule Train, Live at the Troubadour, Volume II (fiddle), 2005.
- Dave Matthews Band, Stand Up (violin), RCA, ASIN: B00082ZSP2, 2005.
- Old School Freight Train, Pickin' on Wilco: Casino Side (fiddle), 2004.
- Old School Freight Train, Old School Freight Train (fiddle), 2002.
- Gary Ruley, Gary Ruley and Mule Train (fiddle), 2002.

== Articles, reviews, interviews, etc. ==
- Assar, Vijith, "FACETIME – Jethro lull: Local gal all over the place", The Hook, April 26, 2007.
- Barnes, Lindsay, "FACETIME – Calhoun's coup: Local violinist shines at the Grammys", The Hook, February 2, 2008.
- Calhoun, Ann Marie, "Last Look: Starving Artist", University of Virginia Arts and Science Magazine, February 17, 2006.
- Fiddler's Grove Ole Time Fiddler's Contest, 1999 winners.
- "Interview with Ann-Marie Calhoun", Let It Rock, October 2006.
- St. George, Donna, "A Shining Moment In Grammy Spotlight: Talent Took N.Va. Violinist to 'Music's Biggest Night'", The Washington Post, February 14, 2008
- Connecther Special Performance by Anne Marie Simpson and Michael Einziger, Girls Impact the World Film Festival Awards, Harvard University, June 1, 2015.
