= Make It Bun Dem =

Single by Skrillex and Damian "Jr. Gong" Marley
- Released: May 1, 2012
- Recorded: 2011
- Genre: Reggaestep; dubstep
- Length: 3:35
- Label: Big Beat; Atlantic; Owsla
- Songwriters: Skrillex, Damian Marley
- Producer: Skrillex

Remix EP cover
- After Hours Remix EP

Skrillex singles chronology
"Chaos Lives in Everything" (2012)	"Make It Bun Dem" (2012)	"Wild for the Night" (2013)

Damian "Jr. Gong" Marley singles chronology
"As We Enter" (2010)	"Make It Bun Dem" (2012)	"Can't Keep Me Down" (2012)

Music video
- "Make It Bun Dem" on YouTube

Audio sample
- 20 second sample from "Make it Bun Dem".: file; help

"Make It Bun Dem" is a song by Skrillex and Damian "Jr. Gong" Marley. The single was released on May 1, 2012, by a request of Ubisoft Entertainment SA.

== Background ==
The song started out as an original, without lyrics, in early 2012. The instrumental had no name, and was only played live. Fans dubbed the song "Rudeboy Bass", as it used the sample "Rudeboy bass, mash up the place!" The song was later re-edited and vocals from Damian Marley's "Welcome to Jamrock" were added. Skrillex eventually sent the demo to Damian. Instead of releasing the song as a remix of "Welcome to Jamrock", Damian offered to record original vocals for the song, replacing the previous ones. This version of the song, with new, original vocals, was premiered at Surrender Night Club in Las Vegas, on January 21, 2012. Damian posted the finalized version of the unnamed song, finally confirmed as "Make It Bun Dem" on his SoundCloud page, on April 16, 2012, as a listen-only track. The release was postponed from an earlier date to May 1, 2012.

== Music video ==
The music video for "Make It Bun Dem" was directed by Tony Truand and debuted on September 6, 2012, via Skrillex's official YouTube channel.

This video depicts a conflict between citizens losing their homes to eminent domain and the officer seeking to evict them to enrich a real estate developer.

The video begins with a Code Enforcement Officer knocking on the doors of people being evicted from their homes, and the victims and their families being pulled struggling from their homes. An elderly Native American man, played by elder Nathan Phillips is shown waiting his turn on his front porch, as a younger family member arrives home and goes into the backyard. The young man begins a ceremonial dance and calls the rain, while two young boys watch him in fascination. The rain comes, and this act of non-violent direct action causes the development plans of the business man to be washed away. Later, the Native Americans have a purification ceremony in which the boy's guardian smears red paint on his face, and hands him a headpiece to wear as regalia. He returns outside and a glowing golden eagle bursts from his chest, followed by a trail of golden light, while the guardian beats a drum in ceremony. The officers accompany Code Enforcement to the house, but then refuse to aid him in breaking into the house and give him the finger, so the Code Enforcement Officer enters the backyard alone, where he is met with the sight of the young Native American boy and the golden bird. The bird flies towards the man and the scene cuts off abruptly. The elder Native American is seen sitting in his living room, surrounded by three huskies.

This video was filmed in Lincoln Park, Michigan, with two local children acting as the children watching the dance of the young Native American man (played by Zakiah Phillips).

== Use in media ==
"Make It Bun Dem" is used in the video game Far Cry 3. The track can be heard playing in a looped form during "Kick the Hornet's Nest", a mission where the player is required to destroy five marijuana fields by setting fire to them with a flamethrower. The song also appeared on an episode of The Magicians.

== Make It Bun Dem After Hours EP ==
An EP with 6 remixes was released in 2012.

== Track listing ==
Digital download
No.	Title	Length
1.	"Make It Bun Dem"	3:33
2.	"Make It Bun Dem" (Culprate Remix)	3:54
3.	"Make It Bun Dem" (Brodinski Remix)	4:32
4.	"Make It Bun Dem" (French Fries Remix)	4:34
5.	"Make It Bun Dem" (David Heartbreak Remix)	3:30
6.	"Make It Bun Dem" (Flinch Remix)	3:56
7.	"Make It Bun Dem" (Alvin Risk Remix)	3:59
Total length:		27:58

== Charts ==
=== Weekly charts ===
Chart (2012–2013)	Peak position
Australia (ARIA)	27
Austria (Ö3 Austria Top 40)	34
Belgium (Ultratop 50 Flanders)	15
Canada (Canadian Hot 100)	34
France (SNEP)	87
New Zealand (Recorded Music NZ)	16
Slovakia (Rádio Top 100)	61
Sweden (Sverigetopplistan)	48
UK Dance (OCC)	14
UK Singles (OCC)	58
US Bubbling Under Hot 100 (Billboard)	6
US Reggae Digital Songs (Billboard)	1

=== Year-end charts ===
Chart (2012)	Position
Belgium (Ultratop Flanders)	64
Chart (2013)	Position
France (SNEP)	197

== Certifications ==
Region	Certification	Certified units/sales
Australia (ARIA)	2× Platinum	140,000^{‡}
Canada (Music Canada)	Gold	40,000^{*}
Italy (FIMI)	Gold	15,000^{‡}
New Zealand (RMNZ)	2× Platinum	60,000^{‡}
United Kingdom (BPI)	Gold	400,000^{‡}
United States (RIAA)	Platinum	1,000,000^{‡}
Streaming
Denmark (IFPI Danmark)	Gold	900,000^{†}
^{*} Sales figures based on certification alone.^{‡} Sales+streaming figures based on certification alone.^{†} Streaming-only figures based on certification alone.
