= Distant Relatives =

Studio album by Nas and Damian Marley
- Released: May 18, 2010
- Recorded: 2008–2010
- Studios: Los Angeles, California; Miami, Florida
- Genres: Hip hop; reggae fusion
- Length: 61:48
- Labels: Ghetto Youths United; Def Jam; Universal Republic
- Producers: Damian Marley; Stephen Marley

Nas chronology
Untitled (2008)	Distant Relatives (2010)	Life Is Good (2012)

Damian Marley chronology
Welcome to Jamrock (2005)	Distant Relatives (2010)	SuperHeavy (2011)

Singles from Distant Relatives
- 1. "As We Enter" Released: February 23, 2010; 2. "Strong Will Continue" Released: April 13, 2010; 3. "My Generation" Released: August 30, 2010

Distant Relatives is a collaborative studio album by American rapper Nas and Jamaican reggae vocalist Damian Marley. It was released on May 18, 2010, by Ghetto Youths United, Universal Republic and Def Jam Recordings.

Distant Relatives was recorded between 2008 and 2010, being produced primarily by Damian and Stephen Marley, both sons of the most-known Jamaican musician Bob Marley. Fusing musical elements of hip hop and reggae, it features wide-ranging lyrical themes concerning colonialism, poverty, Pan-Africanism and the universality of the human condition. It features appearances from K'naan, Stephen Marley, Dennis Brown, Junior Reid, Joss Stone and Lil Wayne.

The album debuted at number five on the US Billboard 200 chart, selling 57,000 copies in its first week. Upon its release, Distant Relatives received positive reviews from most music critics.

== Background ==
News of the album first came at the 2009 Grammy Awards, when Nas told MTV reporters "Right now, I'll tell you first, I'm working on an album with Damian Marley. We tryin' to build some schools in Africa with this one, and trying to build empowerment. We're tryin' to show love and stuff with this album. So, the record's … all about really the 'hood and Africa also as well." The album title derives from Nas and Marley's relationship, their shared African ancestry, and the shared ancestry of the entire human race; which musically and lyrically inspired each recording. Leftover tracks from Nas and Marley's previous albums were originally planned for an EP based on Africa. After working together, the duo decided to record a full album together.

== Recording and production ==
Nas and Marley began recording in 2008; recording sessions took place in Los Angeles, California, and Miami, Florida. Marley and his brother, Stephen, produced the majority of the album, using live instrumentation in the recording process. They collaborated with guest artists, including Stephen Marley, Joss Stone, Lil Wayne, and K'naan. On the album's production, Marley told Rolling Stone, "We're trying to have a sound that's reminiscent of both of us, but not exactly like either... A lot of charity albums come off corny. We want this to be something you'd play in your car."

== Music ==
Fusing hip hop and reggae musical elements, Marley and Nas also incorporated samples from African music into the album. The album's lyrical content heavily revolves around themes concerning Africa, from ancestry and poverty, with social commentary of the United States and Africa. The track "Count Your Blessings" reflects on the plight of Africa.

== Release and promotion ==
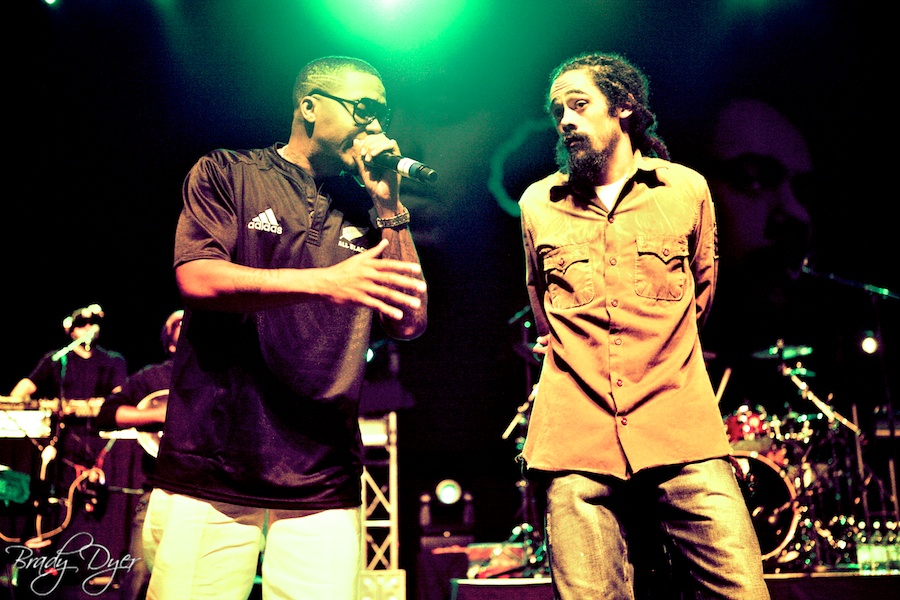
Nas and Marley performing in Wellington, New Zealand, 2011

The album was released May 18, 2010 on Universal Republic and Def Jam Recordings. Its proceeds will go to a project in Africa, with the possibility of building a school in Congo.

=== Panel discussion ===
At a sold-out panel discussion on the African diaspora and its relation to music, sponsored by National Geographic, Damian and Stephen Marley and Nas were among the several hip hop and reggae musicians voicing their solidarity. The discussion focused on the collaborations between artists of the two genres, and highlighted the Distant Relatives project.

=== Singles ===
The first single, "As We Enter", was released on iTunes on February 23, 2010. It has so far peaked at #10 on the iTunes Hip Hop/Rap charts and #41 on the iTunes Music charts. The single debuted at number 39 on the UK Singles Chart. "Strong Will Continue" is featured as soundtrack in EA Sports game, 2010 FIFA World Cup South Africa. "My Generation" was released in the United Kingdom on August 30, 2010.

== Critical reception ==
Professional ratings
Aggregate scores
Source	Rating
Metacritic	73/100
Review scores
Source	Rating
AllMusic	4/5 stars
The A.V. Club	B
The Daily Telegraph	4/5 stars
The Guardian	4/5 stars
Mojo	4/5 stars
MSN Music (Consumer Guide)	A−
Pitchfork	6.1/10
Rolling Stone	3/5 stars
Slant Magazine	4.5/5 stars
Spin	6/10

Distant Relatives received generally positive reviews from music critics. At Metacritic, which assigns a normalized rating out of 100 to reviews from mainstream critics, the album received an average score of 73, based on 23 reviews, which indicates "generally favorable reviews". Allmusic's David Jeffries complimented its themes concerning Africa, calling it "one purposeful monster and a conceptional bull's eye that fully supports its title". Sputnikmusic's Ryan Flatley stated, "Nas and Damian Marley are a formidable pairing, seemingly on the same level throughout most of the album in thought and overall presence". Dave Simpson of The Guardian described its music as "thoughtful, sincere, weighty stuff, tackling subjects from African poverty to the diamond trade without sounding preachy or schmaltzy". Gervase de Wilde of The Daily Telegraph called it "predictably brilliant".

Although he found its musical fusion "a little overblown", David Amidon of PopMatters felt that "the alchemy between Nas and Junior Gong’s voice is obvious and engenders a strong sense of unity". Mojo commented that the album "finds a glorious similitude between the two disciplines." Slant Magazine's M.T. Richards called the album "a bright, richly cultured work" and praised its themes of humanity and humility, writing that it "shines with passion and zeal, both in its content and production, which oozes earthy warmth". In MSN Music, Robert Christgau stated, "The result is an exceptionally melodic reggae album that's intensified by rapping devoid of dancehall patois and a hard edge unknown to roots revivalism. The result is also an exceptionally political hip-hop album that's most convincing when it doesn't multiply Afrocentric distortion by Rastafarian reasoning".

In a mixed review, J. Gabriel Boylan of Spin felt that its "revelatory message blunted by digressions". Sean Fennessey of The Village Voice found it to be "rudimentary" and "a tasteful affair full of uninteresting revelations and self-serious proclamations". Jeff Weiss of the Los Angeles Times commented that the album "vacillates between the dreary and dynamic", and criticized its "didacticism": "[L]eadened by reductive philosophies and crippling self-seriousness, the record often feels overly ponderous". Pitchfork Media's Tom Breihan viewed the lyrics as trite and stated, "Nas and Marley fall into a sort of middlebrow funk, kicking overripe platitudes over sunny session-musician lopes and letting their self-importance suffocate their personalities". Nathan Rabin of The A.V. Club called it "an Afrocentric manifesto sometimes loaded down by the weight of its noble ambitions".

== Commercial performance ==
Distant Relatives debuted at number five on the US Billboard 200 chart with first-week sales of 57,000 copies. It serves as Nas's tenth top-ten album and Marley's second top-ten album in the United States. The album also entered at number four on Billboard's Digital Albums, and at number one on its R&B/Hip-Hop Albums, Rap Albums, and Reggae Albums charts. As of June 2010, it has sold 134,000 copies in the United States.

Internationally, Distant Relatives attained some chart success. It entered at number 33 on the European Top 100 Albums chart. In the United Kingdom, it debuted at number 30 on the UK Albums Chart and at number four on the R&B Albums Chart. In Canada, the album entered at number 9 on the Top 100 Albums chart. In Germany, it debuted at number 38 on the Media Control Charts, and in the Netherlands, the album debuted at number 72 and peaked at number 65 on the Mega Album Top 100.

== Track listing ==
All tracks were produced by Damian Marley, except tracks 4, 9, and 11, which were produced by Stephen Marley.

No.	Title	Writer(s)	Length
1.	"As We Enter"	Nasir Jones; Damian Marley; Mulatu Astatke	2:28
2.	"Tribes at War" (featuring K'naan)	Jones; Marley; Keinan Warsame	4:30
3.	"Strong Will Continue"	Jones; Marley	6:01
4.	"Leaders" (featuring Stephen Marley)	Jones; D. Marley; S. Marley	4:20
5.	"Friends"	Jones; Marley	4:49
6.	"Count Your Blessings"	Jones; Marley	4:24
7.	"Dispear"	Jones; Marley	5:53
8.	"Land of Promise" (featuring Dennis Brown)	Jones; Marley; Dennis Brown	3:53
9.	"In His Own Words" (featuring Stephen Marley)	Jones; D. Marley; S. Marley	5:00
10.	"Nah Mean"	Jones; Marley	4:09
11.	"Patience"	Jones; Marley; Amadou Bajayoko, Mariam Doumbia	5:46
12.	"My Generation" (featuring Joss Stone & Lil Wayne)	Jones; Marley; Dwayne Carter, Jr.	4:00
13.	"Africa Must Wake Up" (featuring K'naan)	Jones; Marley; Warsame	6:40
Total length:			61:48

LP/iTunes bonus track
No.	Title	Writer(s)	Length
14.	"Ancient People" (featuring Junior Reid)	Nasir Jones; Damian Marley; Junior Reid	4:35
Total length:			66:21

Sample credits

- "As We Enter" contains samples of "Yegelle Tezeta" by Mulatu Astatke.
- "Tribes at War" contains a sample from "Tribal War" by Earl Lowe.
- "Friends" contains a sample from "Undenge Uami" by David Zé.
- "Land Of Promise" contains a sample from "Promised Land" by Dennis Brown.
- "Nah Mean" contains a sample from "Kurikute" by Sara Chaves.
- "Patience" contains a sample from "Sabali" by Amadou & Mariam from the album Welcome to Mali.
- "My Generation" contains a sample from "Generation" by Ziggy Marley.

== Personnel ==
Credits for Distant Relatives adapted from Allmusic.

- Luke Aiono – guitar
- Rahsaan Alexander – background vocals
- Chris Athens – mastering
- Kreiger Bailey – background vocals
- Amadou Bajayoko – composer
- Miguel Bermudez – assistant
- Chad Blaize – background vocals
- Dennis Brown – composer, background vocals
- Llamar "Riff Raff" Brown – keyboards
- Ann Marie Calhoun – violin
- Andrea Carter – guitar
- James "Bonzai" Caruso – mixing
- Jason Chantrelle – A&R
- Daniel Chappell – brass
- Squiddly Cole – percussion, drums, keyboards
- Shiah Coore – bass, drums, background vocals, handclapping
- Greg DePante – assistant
- Courtney Diedrick – drums, handclapping
- Sean Diedrick – keyboards
- Mariam Doumbia – composer
- Dwayne Carter – composer
- Nabil Elderkin – photography
- Paul Fakhourie – bass, keyboards
- Andre "Illestr8" Forrest – background vocals, handclapping
- Rovleta Fraser – background vocals
- Nesta Garrick – art direction, design
- Neville Garrick – photography, art consultant
- Marcus Garvey – quotation author
- Rannoy Gordon – guitar
- Andrew Green – engineer
- Tim Harkins – engineer
- Phillip "Winta" James – keyboards, background vocals, handclapping
- Sunday Agwaze Michaels – tumbadora "African conga"
- Nasir Jones – composer, writer, rapper, executive producer, producer, background vocals
- Keinan Warsame – composer
- L.A.'s Best Sunny Brae Choir – background vocals
- Marc Lee – engineer
- Funji Legohn – brass
- Casey Lewis – engineer
- Damian Marley – composer, producer, programming, background vocals, handclapping, executive producer
- Stephen Marley – guitar, composer, keyboards, programming, producer
- George Massa – engineer
- Christopher Merridith – bass, guitar, keyboards
- Jah Amen Mobley – background vocals
- Leon Mobley – percussion, background vocals
- Vernon Mungo – engineer
- Josh Newell – engineer
- Bobby Newland – assistant
- Steve Nowa – assistant
- Oakwood School 5th Grade Choir – background vocals
- Raymond Onyai – background vocals
- George Pajon – guitar
- Lisa Parade – director
- Josef Powell – background vocals
- José Quintero – assistant
- Benjamin Reid – engineer, assistant
- Mike Rowe – keyboards
- James Rudder – assistant
- Noelle Scaggs – background vocals
- Miles Tackett – cello
- Charles Wakeman – engineer, mixing, assistant
- Oren Waters – background vocals
- Will Wheaton – background vocals
- Roselyn Williams – background vocals
- Betty Wright – background vocals
- Eric "Twizted" Young – assistant
- Gabriel Zardes – A&R
- Danny Zook – sample clearance
- Corey Lloyd – sample clearance
- Michael Hardin – sample clearance

== Charts ==
=== Weekly charts ===
Chart (2010)	Peak position
Austrian Albums Chart	53
Canadian Albums Chart	9
Dutch Albums Chart	72
German Albums Chart	38
Norwegian Albums Chart	32
Swedish Albums Chart	42
Swiss Albums Chart	11
UK Albums Chart	30
UK R&B Albums	4
US Billboard 200	5
US Top R&B/Hip-Hop Albums (Billboard)	1
US Top Rap Albums (Billboard)	1
US Top Reggae Albums (Billboard)	1

=== Year-end charts ===
Chart (2010)	Position
US Billboard 200	170

== Certifications ==
Certifications and sales for Distant Relatives
Region	Certification	Certified units/sales
United Kingdom (BPI)	Silver	60,000^{‡}
^{‡} Sales+streaming figures based on certification alone.
