= Twelve Years a Slave (disambiguation) =

Twelve Years a Slave is an 1853 memoir by Solomon Northup.

Twelve Years a Slave may also refer to:

- 12 Years a Slave (film), a 2013 film based on the memoir
  - 12 Years a Slave (soundtrack), the film soundtrack
  - 12 Years a Slave (score), the film score

== See also ==
- Solomon Northup's Odyssey, a 1984 television adaptation of the memoir
