= Miracle Worker =

Single by SuperHeavy

from the album SuperHeavy
- Released: 7 July 2011
- Genre: Reggae, pop
- Length: 4:07
- Label: A&M
- Songwriters: Mick Jagger, Damian Marley, Joss Stone, Dave Stewart, A. R. Rahman
- Producers: Mick Jagger, Dave Stewart, Damian Marley

SuperHeavy singles chronology
"Miracle Worker" (2011)	"Satyameva Jayathe" (2011)

"Miracle Worker" is the debut single by rock supergroup SuperHeavy from their self-titled debut studio album. It is a reggae/pop song performed by Damian Marley, Joss Stone, and Mick Jagger. It was released on 7 July 2011 as a digital download in the United Kingdom. The song peaked to number 136 on the UK Singles Chart but it was a big hit in Japan peaking at number 9. In Italy it was certified gold for downloads exceeding 15,000 units.

== Music video ==
A music video to accompany the release of "Miracle Worker" was uploaded to YouTube on 12 August 2011 at a total length of five minutes and eight seconds. It was directed by Paul Boyd and filmed at Paramount Studios in Los Angeles, the video features all five members of the band.

== Reception ==
In a 2015 Billboard article, Jason Lipshutz named "Miracle Worker" the 6th-worst song of the first half of the 2010s decade, citing the lyrics and the "half-hearted reggae beat."

== Track listing ==
Digital download
No.	Title	Length
1.	"Miracle Worker" (Chris Lord-Alge Radio Mix)	4:07
2.	"Miracle Worker" (Damian "Jr Gong" Marley Main Mix - Radio Edit)	4:07

== Charts and certifications ==
=== Weekly charts ===
Chart (2011)	Peak position
Belgium (Ultratip Bubbling Under Flanders)	28
Belgium (Ultratip Bubbling Under Wallonia)	35
Austria (Ö3 Austria Top 40)	37
France (SNEP)	86
Hungary (Rádiós Top 40)	35
Italy (FIMI)	17
Netherlands (Single Top 100)	25
Japan (Oricon)	9
Poland (ZPAV)	3
Switzerland (Schweizer Hitparade)	63
UK Singles (The Official Charts Company)	136
US Triple A (Billboard)	14

=== Certifications ===
Region	Certification	Certified units/sales
Italy (FIMI)	Gold	15,000^{*}
^{*} Sales figures based on certification alone.

== Release history ==
Region	Date	Format	Label
United Kingdom	7 July 2011	Digital Download	A&M Records
