= Mary Simpson (violinist) =

American violinist

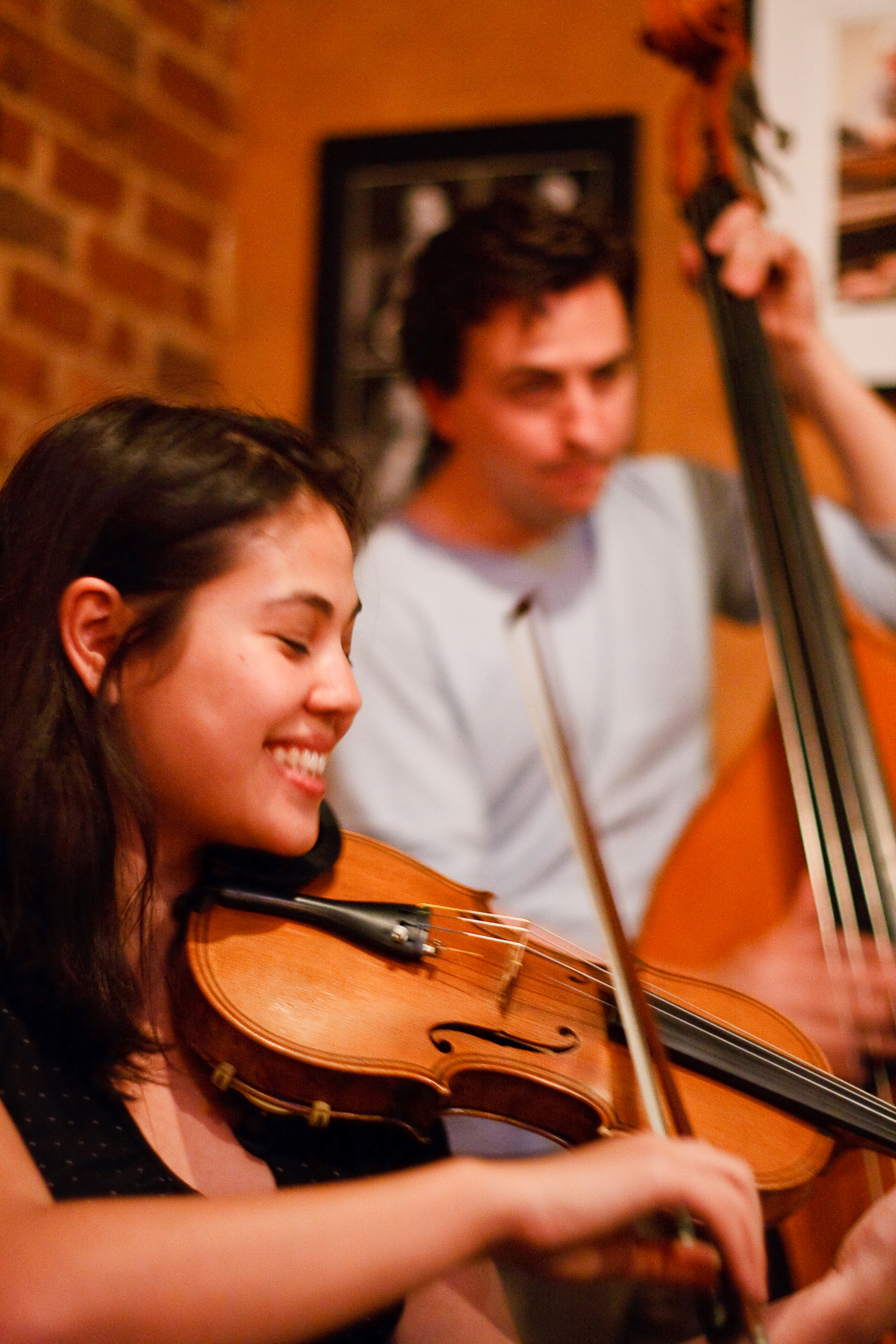
- With The Whiskey Rebellion Fellini's No. 9 restaurant Charlottesville; Americana Night April 2009

Background information
- Born: Mary Ellen Simpson
- Education: University of Virginia
- Occupation: Violinist
- Website: maryellensimpson.com

Mary Ellen Simpson is an American violinist, mostly noted for her work with Yanni, Gary Ruley and Mule Train and Walker's Run. She is a founding member of The Whiskey Rebellion band.

== Biography ==
Simpson's father, a documented descendant of Pocahontas, plays banjo and her Taiwanese mother is a classically trained pianist. She is the sister of noted violinist Ann Marie Calhoun and her brothers play guitar.

She began learning to play violin at the age of five. She says she grew up listening to her sister play. Like her sister she played bluegrass music in her family band. According to Simpson, "her classical background gives her a wider variety of tones and better control of her sound than she would have had she only studied bluegrass."

Mary attended Lake Braddock Secondary School in Burke, Virginia. She has a double major in music and economics from the University of Virginia.

=== The Whiskey Rebellion ===
Mary Simpson, Roy Myers, Ryan Phillips, and David Cosper connected the summer of 2005 at the Maury River Fiddler's Convention in Buena Vista, Virginia. Myers and Phillips had been performing around Richmond while Simpson and Cosper appeared in Charlottesville while studying music at the University of Virginia. The Richmond faction invited the Charlottesvillians east for some gigs and the band was formed. As to how an historic event – the "unhappy reaction of whiskey makers to a tax imposed by the federal government during George Washington's presidency" – ended up being their band name, Phillips explains:

We were practicing music at Roy's house on Floyd Avenue years ago when we glanced over at the TV. There was a special on about the Whiskey Rebellion. We had been looking around for a name and that one stuck.

Tim Deibler, bass player − a resident of Charlottesville, Virginia, who studied music at Christopher Newport University − is the newest member of the group.

The Whiskey Rebellion went into the recording studio this September 2010 and recorded several new songs which will be included on an upcoming EP.

== Performance ==
The Whiskey Rebellion has appeared at numerous notable music festivals such as the 25th anniversary of "The Goonies" Festival in Astoria, Oregon; Maury River Fiddler's Convention in Buena Vista, Virginia; and Watermelon Park Festival in Berryville, Virginia. They have shared the bill with such acts as The Sam Bush Band, Peter Rowan and Tony Rice, Tim O'Brien, The Seldom Scene, the Carolina Chocolate Drops, Larry Keel, and many more.

Simpson performed with Yanni on his 2011 North American Spring Tour. They played such venues as Radio City Music Hall in New York City, The Warfield Theatre in San Francisco, and the Fox Theatre in Atlanta.

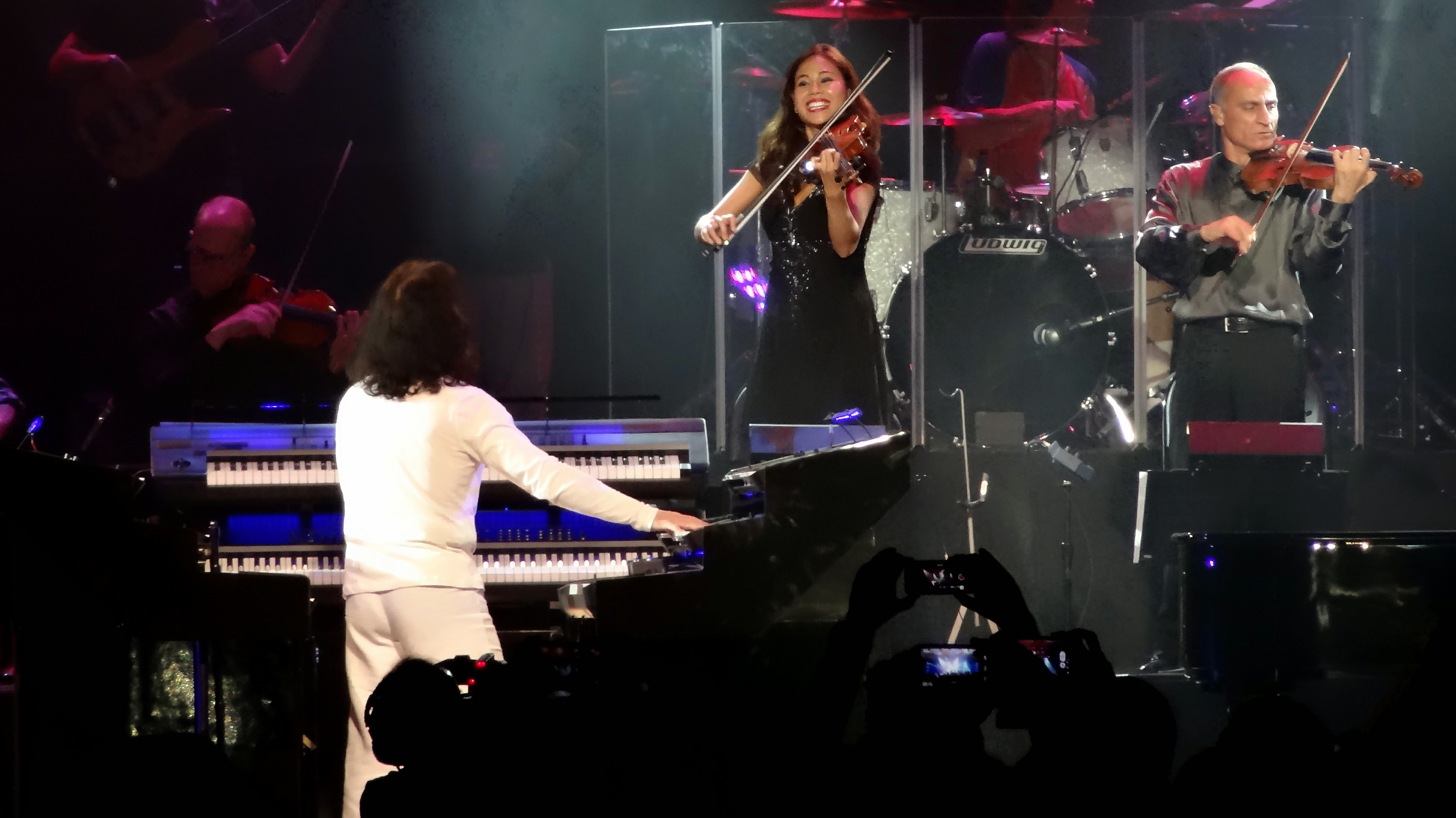
Simpson performs with Samvel Yervinyan and Yanni at a concert in Bangalore (India) on April 18, 2014, as part of Yanni's 2014 World Tour

She was part of Yanni's orchestra in the 2014 World Tour and part of his 2016 North American Tour.

== Musical style ==
The Whiskey Rebellion "plays a mostly high-energy, joyful brand of bluegrass, with skillful picking and two and three-part harmonies" according to The Virginia Pilot. But, while a "casual listen" to their debut album might tempt one to "plug the band into the category reserved for pure bluegrass," warns the Richmond Times-Dispatch, "... there's much more to The Whiskey Rebellion than twang and high lonesome." Says founder Simpson: "We play a lot of bluegrass standards, and we also take a lot of popular songs and cover them, bluegrass style."

Our shows consist of a mix of originals, bluegrass standards and random cover songs such as Hendrix, Gnarls Barkley, The Beatles, Dylan, and Johnny Cash."

— Ryan Phillips

== Personnel ==
Musicians performing together in The Whiskey Rebellion include:

- Mary Simpson – violin / vocals
- Jared Pool – mandolin / vocals
- Roy Myers – banjo
- Tim Deibler – bass
- Ryan Phillips – guitar

== Distinctions, honors, and awards ==
- The Whiskey Rebellion music video, The Ballad of Chester Copperpot, took the 2010 Gold Level Oregon Film Awards: Oregon Film Competition at the Oregon Film Festival.
- The Whiskey Rebellion mandolinist Jared Pool performed a show with John Starling, founding member of The Seldom Scene, in Starling's hometown of Fredericksburg, Virginia.
- Ryan Phillips placed first in the 2010 Watermelon Park Festival guitar contest. The prize was a custom Left Handed Fairbuilt Barnburner guitar (base value of $2,400). He placed third in the same contest in 2007.
- The Whiskey Rebellion was invited to play the 25th anniversary of "The Goonies" Festival that took place June 4–7, 2010 in Astoria, Oregon.
- Jared Pool placed first in the 2007 Watermelon Park Festival guitar contest, winning a Fairbuilt Barnburner guitar (base value of $2,400).
- The Pat Ruley Trophy for Best All Around Blue Grass Performer, named for Gary Ruley's father and presented annually at the Maury River Fiddler's Convention held in Buena Vista, Virginia, was won by Mary Simpson in 2005.

== Discography ==
- The Whiskey Rebellion (2007) Crop Circle Records
- Lay It Down (2009), CD Baby
