= Satyameva Jayathe (song) =

Single by SuperHeavy

from the album SuperHeavy
- Released: 9 August 2011
- Genre: Indian pop, rock
- Length: 4:07
- Label: A&M
- Songwriter(s): A. R. Rahman; Damian Marley; Joss Stone
- Producer(s): A. R. Rahman; Mick Jagger; Dave Stewart; Damian Marley

SuperHeavy singles chronology
"Miracle Worker" (2011)	"Satyameva Jayathe" (2011)

"Satyameva Jayathe" is a song by rock supergroup SuperHeavy from their eponymous debut album (2011). It is a Sanskrit-language song performed by A. R. Rahman and Mick Jagger, released on 9 August 2011 as the album's second single.

== Background ==
"Satyameva Jayathe" is named after the national motto of India, which literally translates as "Truth Alone Triumphs". Rahman revealed that his long dream was "to take one of the morals of Indian culture which is 'Satyameva Jayathe' and make it as a song."

== Release ==
"Satyameva Jayathe" was released as the second single from the album on 9 August 2011, a week before India's Independence Day on 15 August. The single is written and composed by Rahman, also features Jagger singing in Sanskrit. The song premiered exclusively on Radio Mirchi 98.3 FM on 9 August across twenty-two Indian cities, and Tata DoCoMo simultaneously promoted the song and the album on mass media.

Hindu statesman Rajan Zed welcomed and appreciated Jagger and his group for experimenting in Sanskrit, also urging other popular singers and groups to record in Sanskrit.

== Music video ==
VH1 India asked Indians to shoot and send in videos of their interpretations of the word truth (or satya). The best videos were selected and strung together to create a video for the song. According to VH1 India, they received in all 500 entries and selected a video where a soldier drops his gun and picks up a guitar, and another featured a tale told through the eyes of a child. SuperHeavy was reportedly involved in selecting the videos which made make the cut.
