= Old School Freight Train =

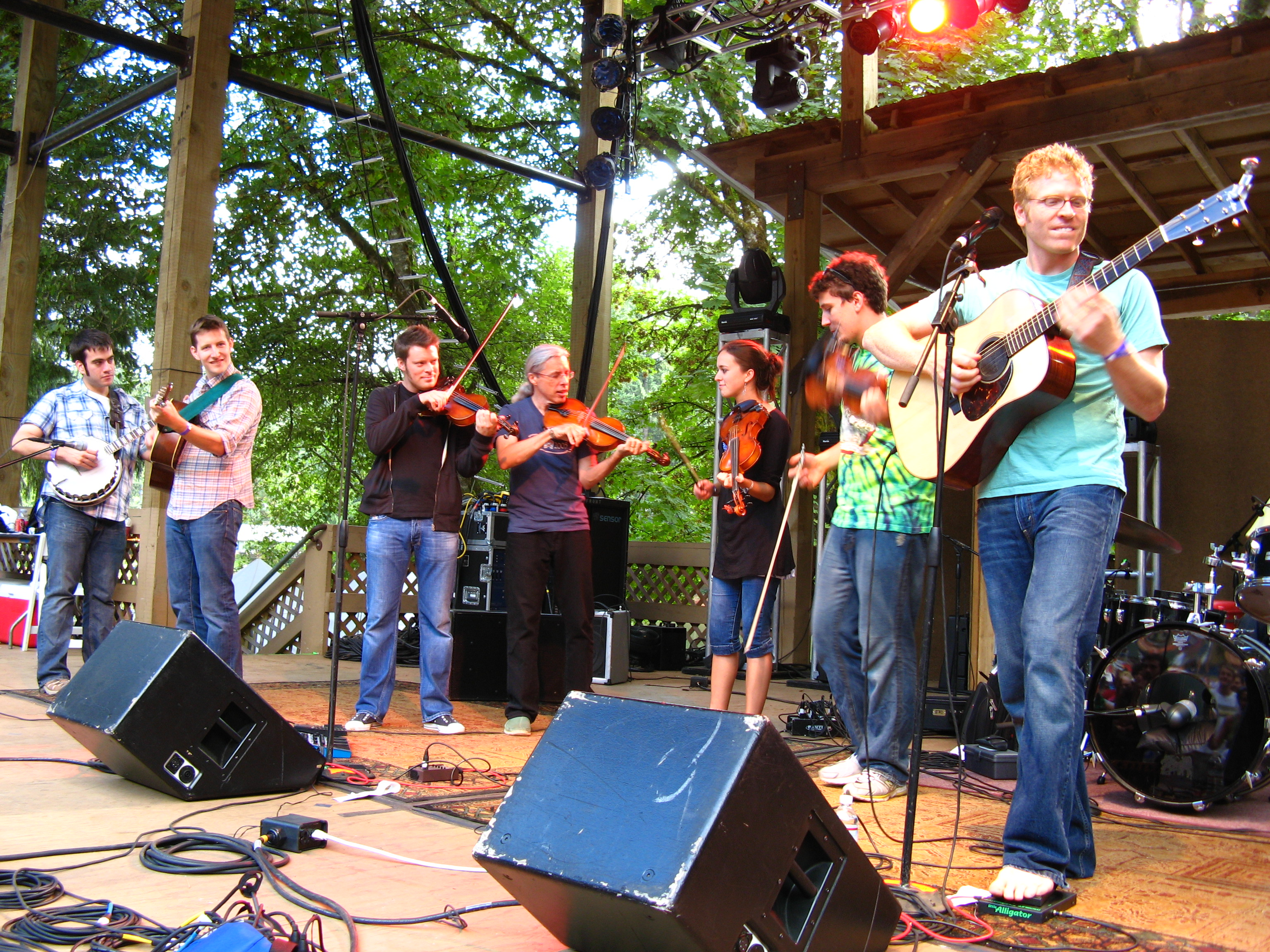
- Northwest String Summit; North Plains, Oregon August 2007; Noam Pikelny, Luke Bulla, Darol Anger & Brittany Haas

Background information
- Origin: Virginia, United States
- Genres: Folk; Country; Americana; Bluegrass; Old-time
- Years active: 2000–2009
- Labels: Acoustic Disc management: Ann Kingston
- Members: Jesse Harper; Pete Frostic; Nate Leath; Darrell Muller; Nick Falk
- Past members: Ann Marie Calhoun (née Simpson); Ben Krakauer

Old School Freight Train (OSFT) was a Charlottesville, Virginia-based band that combined bluegrass, jazz, Latin, and Celtic sounds to create their music.

== Career ==
The band's eponymous debut album, Old School Freight Train, was met with considerable acclaim. Relix magazine, included them in their "Artists Too New to Know" series in May 2005. Daniel Gewertz of the Boston Herald called them: "The most talented young string band in the land."

Mandolin master David Grisman heard their music in the Fall of 2004 and invited them record at his Dawg Studios in Mill Valley, California. He manned the production and recording himself with the help of Dave Dennison. From these sessions came Run, OSFT's second album and their first for Acoustic Disc, Grisman's acclaimed independent label. He says of the experience:

After forty years of recording acoustic music, it's not very often that a new band catches (and keeps) my attention. Old School Freight Train has done that and more. They are certainly an emerging force to reckon with in today's wide world of acoustic music.

They have backed David Grisman as his band on several tours in 2005 and 2006. They opened for Merle Haggard on May 3, 2006, at the Charlottesville Pavilion. They were co-billed with King Wilkie at the Starr Hill Music Hall in Charlottesville, Virginia November 15, 2006. They played at the Kennedy Center in Washington, D.C., on September 23, 2006.

The band's tour schedule has included the Newport Folk Festival, MerleFest, Wintergrass, Strawberry Music Festival, and the Menokin Bluegrass Festival in Warsaw, Virginia. In 2007, they played the Stagecoach Festival in Indio, California.

Six Years was released on March 17, 2009. The group has since disbanded.

== Reception ==
Tim Dickinson, National Affairs Correspondent for Rolling Stone, said of the group's sound:

Shades of Jack Johnson, Ben Harper...even a kiss of Van Morrison. With Not Like The Others, Old School Freight Train is off on a timeless new track, blending roots and rock to create a sound that's all their own.

Relix magazine, including OSFT in their "Artists Too New to Know" series in May 2005, described their playing as:

Musically daring, the outfit melds folk, bluegrass, jazz, soul and pop into a seamless blend with invigorating and accomplished picking.

Daniel Gewertz of the Boston Herald noted:

...they finesse everything from breakneck bluegrass and seductive, sinuous Gypsy jazz to a dynamic, grassed-up version of Stevie Wonder's 'Superstition.' There are even brief side-trips to Ireland and Latin America. This Virginia-based Freight Train hurtles along the roots-music tracks with grace and style.

David Grisman, who recorded their album Run on his independent label, said:

Their finely crafted tunes and innovative arrangements bring creativity, taste and wit to a broad spectrum of contemporary styles - vocal and instrumental, all firmly rooted in many traditions.

In his review of Six Years, John Borgmeyer said in the C-Ville Weekly:

Six Years marks an evolution for Charlottesville's Old School Freight Train, in which the band leaps from the well-traveled track of "newgrass" onto a blend of pop and traditional music that's all its own.

== Personnel ==
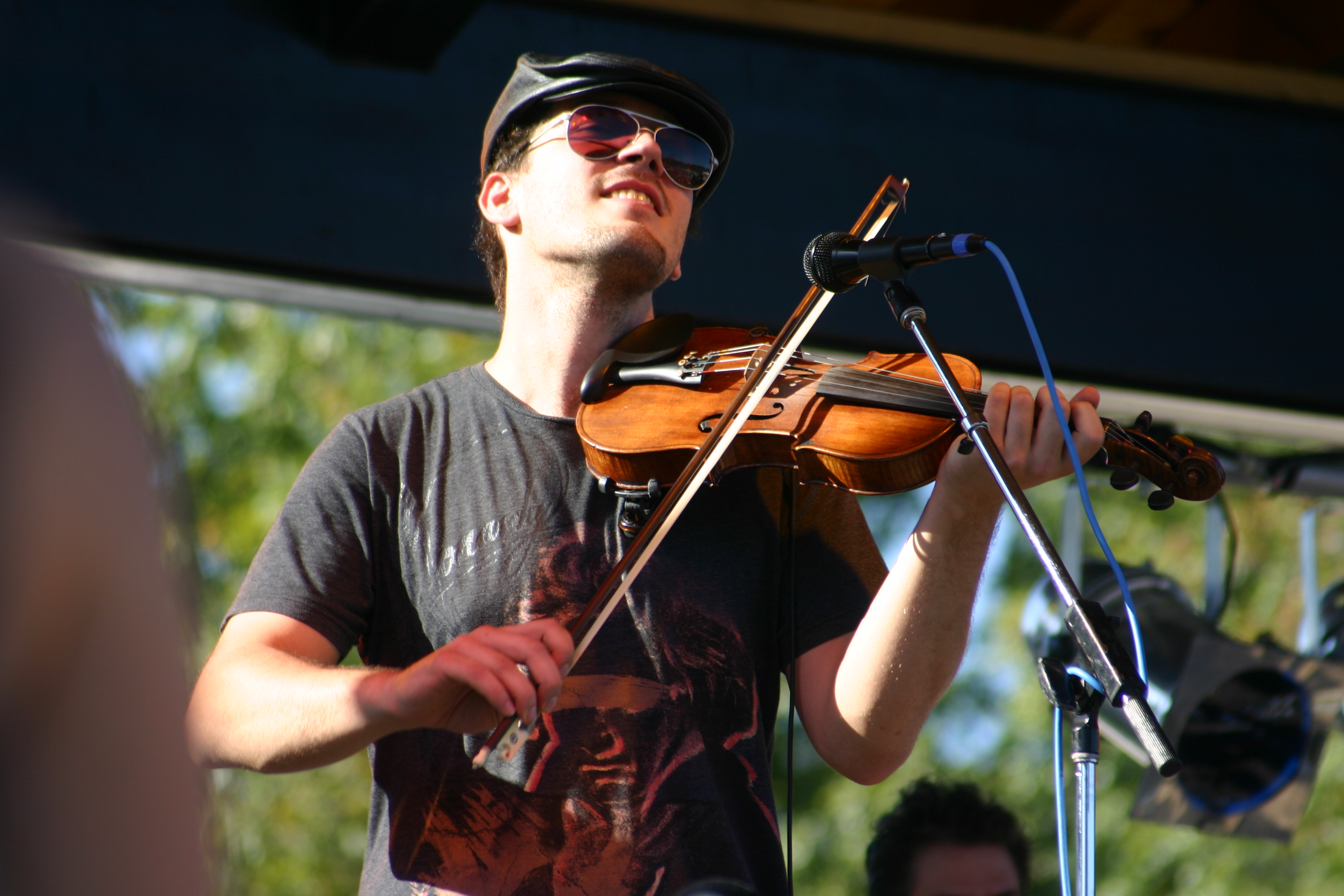
Nate Leath on fiddle with Old School Freight Train at The Festy music festival in Nelson County, Virginia on October 9, 2010

Old School Freight Train's vocalist, songwriter, and guitarist was Jesse Harper. Pete Frostic played mandolin, Nate Leath played fiddle, Darrell Muller played upright bass, and Nick Falk was the drummer.

Former members have included Ann Marie Calhoun (née Simpson) on the fiddle, and Ben Krakauer on banjo. They went on to play in Walker's Run. Calhoun has also performed with Jethro Tull, Steve Vai, and well as Ringo Starr. She was also the "My GRAMMY Moment 2008" winner on the 50th Annual GRAMMY Awards, chosen to perform with the Foo Fighters live.

== Discography ==
=== Albums ===
- Old School Freight Train (2002), Courthouse Records – ASIN: B000083GLJ
- Pickin' On John Mayer: A Bluegrass Tribute (2003), Various Artists CMH Records
- Pickin' On Wilco: Casino Side (2004), CMH Records – ASIN: B000294ROE
- Run (2005), Acoustic Disc – ASIN: B00080Z66K
- Pickin' On Coldplay: A Bluegrass Tribute (2005), Various Artists CMH Records – ASIN: B00070Q886
- Pickin' On John Mayer Vol. 2 (2005), Various Artists CMH Records
- Live in Ashland (2006) – ASIN: B000WGX6LM
- Six Years (2009) Red Distribution — ASIN: B001QWEE3A

=== Guest appearances ===
- Josh Ritter, Live at the 9:30 Club (April 19, 2008) – "Next to the Last True Romantic"
