= Mr. Marley =

Studio album by Damian "Jr. Gong" Marley
- Released: 1996
- Recorded: 1995–1996
- Genre: Reggae
- Length: 51:46
- Label: Ghetto Youths
- Producer: Stephen Marley, Damian Marley

Damian "Jr. Gong" Marley chronology
Mr. Marley (1996)	Halfway Tree (2001)

Professional ratings
Review scores
Source	Rating
AllMusic	4/5 stars
RapReviews	8.5/10

Mr. Marley is the debut studio album by Jamaican reggae artist Damian "Jr. Gong" Marley. The album was released in 1996. The cover of the album depicts Damian's father, Bob Marley, holding him when he was a child. Mr. Marley was produced by Stephen Marley and Damian.

== Track listing ==
1. "Trouble" featuring Stephen Marley (Bob Marley; cover of "So Much Trouble")
2. "Love and Unity"
3. "10,000 Chariots" (Bob Marley; contains a sample of "Midnight Ravers")
4. "Old War Chant"
5. "Party Time"
6. "Kingston 12" (Bob Marley; cover of "Trenchtown Rock")
7. "Keep on Grooving" (Curtis Mayfield; adaptation of "I Gotta Keep on Moving")
8. "Searching (So Much Bubble)"
9. "One More Cup of Coffee" (Bob Marley; contains a sample of "One Cup of Coffee")
10. "Julie"
11. "Me Name Jr. Gong" (Bob Marley; contains a sample of "Crazy Baldhead, Carlton Barrett on drums")
12. "Mr. Marley"
