= As We Enter =

Single by Nas and Damian Marley

from the album Distant Relatives
- Released: February 23, 2010
- Recorded: 2009
- Genre: Hip hop, dancehall
- Length: 2:58
- Label: Def Jam, Universal Republic
- Songwriter(s): Mulatu Astatke, Nasir Jones, Damian Marley, Jamaal Sublett
- Producer(s): Damian Marley

Nas singles chronology
"Too Many Rappers" (2009)	"As We Enter" (2010)	"Fall in Love" (2010)

Damian Marley singles chronology
"Now That You Got It" (2007)	"As We Enter" (2010)	"Make It Bun Dem" (2012)

"As We Enter" is the first single from Nas and Damian Marley's collaboration album, Distant Relatives. The track is produced by Damian Marley. There are no full verses in the song, but rather Nas and Damian Marley rap in call-and-response fashion. The track contains samples of Mulatu Astatke's song "Yegelle Tezeta".

== Charts ==
Chart (2010)	Peak position
UK Singles (OCC)	39
US Billboard Bubbling Under Hot 100 Singles	16
US Billboard Hot Digital R&B/Hip-Hop Songs	18

== Remixes ==
A video was released by Kya Bamba on YouTube called "We Speak No Jamaicano", a merge of As We Enter and the single "We Speak No Americano" by Yolanda Be Cool.
