= The Master Has Come Back =

Single by Damian Marley

from the album Welcome to Jamrock
- Released: December 12, 2005
- Recorded: 2005
- Genre: Reggae
- Length: 4:39
- Label: Tuff Gong/Universal
- Songwriter(s): Damian Marley
- Producer(s): Stephen Marley, scratches performed by Corey Chase

Damian Marley singles chronology
"Welcome to Jamrock" (2005)	"The Master Has Come Back" (2005)	"Road to Zion" (2005)

"The Master Has Come Back" was the second international single from Damian Marley's Welcome to Jamrock album, while "Road to Zion" was released in the U.S. Released on December 12, 2005.

In 1976, Bunny Wailer released his solo album Blackheart Man featuring a song called "Bide Up". It is no coincidence that the chorus ("The master has come back"), lyrics ("for the dark clouds to bring rain, then comes the sun to shine again"), and the general sense of the song reappear on Damian's version. Wailer being one of the two last living members of the original Bob Marley and the Wailers, his closeness with the Marley family is evident.

The single was played on radio and has charted in the UK at #74, but there is no video for it.

== Track listing ==
UK - CD

1. "The Master Has Come Back" (UK Radio Edit)
2. "And You Be Loved (Halfway Tree Album Version)"
3. "Road to Zion" (featuring Nas) (Video)
