= Halfway Tree =

Studio album by Damian "Jr. Gong" Marley
- Released: September 11, 2001
- Recorded: 2000–2001
- Studio: Quad Studios (New York, NY); Marley Music Studios (Kingston, Jamaica); Tuff Gong Recording Studios (Kingston, Jamaica); The Hit Factory (Miami, FL); Sonic Sound Studios (Kingston, Jamaica)
- Genre: Reggae; reggae fusion; dancehall
- Length: 1:11:58
- Label: Motown
- Producer: Stephen Marley; Damian Marley; Kid Nyce; Swizz Beatz

Damian "Jr. Gong" Marley chronology
| Mr. Marley (1996) | Halfway Tree (2001) | Welcome to Jamrock (2005) |

Professional ratings
Review scores
| Source | Rating |
|---|---|
| AllMusic | 4/5 stars |

Halfway Tree is the second album by Jamaican reggae musician Damian "Jr. Gong" Marley. It was released on September 11, 2001 via Motown Records. Recording sessions took place at Marley Music Studios, Tuff Gong Recording Studios and Sonic Sound Studios in Kingston, Quad Studios in New York and The Hit Factory in Miami. Production was handled by Stephen Marley, Kid Nyce, Swizz Beatz and Jr. Gong himself, with Roland Lyfook, David Cole and Diavallan Fearon serving as co-producers. It features guest appearances from Yami Bolo, Stephen Marley, Treach, Bounty Killer, Bunny Wailer, Capleton, Daddigan, Drag-On, Eve, Jimmy Cozier, Mr. Cheeks and Sabor.

In the United States, the album debuted at number 2 on the Billboard Reggae Albums chart, selling 2,000 units in its first week. At the 44th Annual Grammy Awards ceremony held in 2002, the album won a Grammy Award for Best Reggae Album. As of September 21, 2005, it has sold 91,000 recognized copies in the US.

The name "Halfway Tree" comes from his mother, Cindy Breakspeare, being from the rich part of town, and his father, Bob Marley, coming from the poor part of town, thus him being "a tree halfway in between the 'rich' world and 'poor' world". Additionally, Halfway Tree is a well-known landmark that marks the cultural center of Half-Way-Tree, the clock tower that stands where the historical eponymous cotton tree once stood is featured prominently behind Marley on the cover of the album.

== Track listing ==
| No. | Title | Writer(s) | Producer(s) | Length |
|---|---|---|---|---|
| 1. | "Educated Fools" (featuring Treach, Bunny Wailer and Bounty Killer) | Damian Marley; Anthony Criss; Neville Livingston; Rodney Price; Stephen Marley | Stephen Marley; Kid Nyce | 5:17 |
| 2. | "More Justice" | Damian Marley; David Marley | Stephen Marley; Damian "Jr. Gong" Marley | 3:34 |
| 3. | "It Was Written" (featuring Stephen Marley, Capleton and Drag-On) | Damian Marley; S. Marley; Clifton Bailey; Melvin Smalls; Orlando Toledano; Hugo González | Stephen Marley | 6:01 |
| 4. | "Catch a Fire" | Damian Marley; S. Marley | Stephen Marley | 4:51 |
| 5. | "Still Searchin'" (featuring Stephen Marley and Yami Bolo) | Damian Marley; S. Marley; Rolando McLean | Stephen Marley; Roland Lyfook (co.) | 5:04 |
| 6. | "She Needs My Love" (featuring Yami Bolo and Sabor) | Damian Marley; S. Marley; Luis Tineo; Lowell Dunbar; Robert Shakespeare | Stephen Marley | 4:16 |
| 7. | "Mi Blenda" | Damian Marley; S. Marley | Stephen Marley | 4:41 |
| 8. | "Where Is the Love" (featuring Eve) | Damian Marley; Eve Jeffers; S. Marley; David Bryon Cole; Diavallan Everett Fearon | Stephen Marley; David Cole (co.); Dia (co.) | 5:07 |
| 9. | "Harder (Interlude)" | | | 0:42 |
| 10. | "Born to Be Wild" | Damian Marley; S. Marley | Stephen Marley; Damian "Jr. Gong" Marley | 4:00 |
| 11. | "Give Dem Some Way" (featuring Daddigan) | Damian Marley; Gabra Lambert; S. Marley | Stephen Marley | 4:01 |
| 12. | "Half Way Tree (Interlude)" | Damian Marley; S. Marley | Stephen Marley | 1:44 |
| 13. | "Paradise Child" (featuring Mr. Cheeks and Jimmy Cozier) | Damian Marley; Terrance Kelly; S. Marley; William Clarke; Michael Cooper; Stephen Coore; Richard Daley; Irvin Jarrett; Dennis Schloss; Stephen Stewart; Willie Stewart | Stephen Marley; Damian "Jr. Gong" Marley | 4:01 |
| 14. | "Stuck in Between" | Damian Marley; S. Marley | Stephen Marley; Roland Lyfook (co.) | 3:43 |
| 15. | "Half Way Tree" | Damian Marley; S. Marley; Kaseem Dean | Stephen Marley; Swizz Beatz | 5:25 |
| 16. | "Stand a Chance/And You Be Loved" (featuring Treach and Yami Bolo) | Damian Marley; Criss; McLean; S. Marley; Will Jennings; Joseph Sample | Stephen Marley; Damian "Jr. Gong" Marley | 9:31 |
| Total length: | | | | 1:11:58 |

Notes

- Track 16 contains a hidden track "And You Be Loved", which starts at 5:08 mark.

Sample credits

- Track 3 contains excerpts from "No Morira Jamas" written by Orlando Toledano and Hugo González and performed by Los Ángeles Negros.
- Track 9 contains a dialogue from the film The Harder They Come.
- Track 13 contains excerpts from "Lagos Jump" written by William Clarke, Michael Cooper, Stephen Coore, Richard Daley, Irvin Jarrett, Dennis Schloss, Stephen Stewart and Willie Stewart and performed by Third World.
- Track 16 contains excerpts from "Soul Shadows" written by Will Jennings and Joseph Sample and performed by Bill Withers.
- Hidden track contains a portion of "Could You Be Loved" written and performed by Bob Marley.

== Charts ==
| Chart (2001) | Peak position |
|---|---|
| US Reggae Albums (Billboard) | 2 |
