= SuperHeavy =

Supergroup featuring Mick Jagger, Joss Stone, and Dave Stewart (2009–2011)

- Origin: Los Angeles, California
- Genres: Rock; reggae; Indian pop; electronic; soul
- Years active: 2009–2011
- Labels: A&M; Surfdog
- Past members: Mick Jagger; Joss Stone; A. R. Rahman; Dave Stewart; Damian Marley

SuperHeavy was a one-off supergroup project consisting of Mick Jagger, Joss Stone, Dave Stewart, A. R. Rahman, and Damian Marley. Stone and Stewart have collaborated in the past with Jagger. Jagger said of the band, "We wanted a convergence of different musical styles... We were always overlapping styles, but they were nevertheless separate". Jagger wanted SuperHeavy to showcase different musical styles, with music ranging from reggae to ballads to Indian music.

== History ==
The existence of SuperHeavy was secret until May 2011. Mick Jagger, English musician and the lead vocalist of rock band the Rolling Stones, announced its formation on 20 May 2011. SuperHeavy was Dave Stewart's idea. Inspired by the sounds washing into his home in St Ann's Bay, Jamaica, Stewart urged Jagger to fuse their sound with that of Indian orchestras. Stewart and Jagger had mutual liking for Indian orchestrations; thus, A. R. Rahman was added to the supergroup. The name of the band is said to be inspired by Muhammad Ali.

In early 2009, Jagger, Rahman, Stewart, Joss Stone and Damian Marley experimented at Jim Henson Studios in Los Angeles, California, trying to "write songs which had meaning", during which they recorded 29 songs in 10 days. SuperHeavy is rounded out by Marley's rhythm section of bassist/composer Shiah Coore and drummer Courtney Diedrick along with a longtime Stewart collaborator, rock violinist Ann Marie Calhoun.

The group began recording their self-titled debut album in early 2009 at a studio in Los Angeles. The album was previewed at Jim Henson Studios, Los Angeles, on 30 June 2011. The band played eight of the recorded songs at the event. Their debut single, "Miracle Worker", released on 6 July 2011, received mostly positive reviews. Mick Jagger sings in Sanskrit on "Satyameva Jayathe" ("truth alone triumphs"), the second single, released on 9 August 2011. Composed by Rahman, the song also features Stewart, Stone and Marley.

== Members ==
- Mick Jagger – vocals, guitar & harmonica
- Damian Marley – vocals & programming
- Joss Stone – vocals
- A. R. Rahman – vocals, piano, synthesizers, Continuum Fingerboard, drum programming
- Dave Stewart – lead guitar

Personnel:

- Marc VanGool - technician

== Discography ==
=== Studio albums ===
Title	Details	Peak chart positions									
Title	Details	AUT	BEL	DEN	NL	NOR	NZ	SWE	SWI	UK	US
SuperHeavy	Released: 19 September 2011; Label: A&M; Formats: CD, digital download	1	10	9	1	17	12	31	2	13	26

=== Singles ===
Title	Year	Peak chart positions					Album
Title	Year	AUT	BEL	NL	SWI	UK	Album
"Miracle Worker"	2011	37	71	25	63	136	SuperHeavy
"Satyameva Jayathe"	2011	—	—	—	—	—	SuperHeavy

=== Other charted songs ===
Title	Year	Peak chart positions	Album
Title	Year	NL	Album
"Beautiful People"	2011	64	SuperHeavy
