= 12 Years a Slave (score) =

Film score by Hans Zimmer
- Released: 2013
- Recorded: 2013
- Genre: Soundtrack
- Length: 38:48
- Label: Remote Control Productions; Columbia Records
- Producer: Hans Zimmer

Hans Zimmer chronology
Music from and Inspired by 12 Years a Slave (2013)	12 Years a Slave (2013)	Winter's Tale (2014)

12 Years a Slave is the original soundtrack album to the 2013 film 12 Years a Slave starring Chiwetel Ejiofor, Michael Fassbender, Benedict Cumberbatch, Paul Dano, and Lupita Nyong'o. The record contains twenty-one tracks from the original film score written and composed by Hans Zimmer. Despite its limited release, critical acclaim has been given to the score from the film industry. The score was nominated for the 2013 Golden Globe Award for Best Original Score, and won the 2013 Washington D.C. Area Film Critics Association award for Best Score.

== Composition ==
Having been interested in each other's work for some time, director Steve McQueen approached composer Hans Zimmer to write the score to 12 Years a Slave after filming had completed, explaining, "We had a mysterious conversation a couple of years back where [McQueen] told me he was working on something and asked me if I was even remotely interested in working with him," says Zimmer. Zimmer, however, expressed reluctance to accept the offer feeling he wasn't the right person for the job. Zimmer explained, "I felt I wasn't the guy, in a way. It was such an important, heavy, incredible subject. [...] It took a bit of persuading from [McQueen] to give me the confidence to do it". On April 30, 2013, it was officially announced that Zimmer was scoring the film.

== Development ==
Director Steve McQueen liked the mood of Zimmer's music from The Thin Red Line, which itself became a starting point for discussion and development regarding the mood for 12 Years a Slave. McQueen explained, "He was my refuge when I was in L.A. The first two meetings were about five hours each. Then I think we had three two-hour conversations on the phone. And not a musical note was played. After that, [Zimmer] said, 'I think I've got something.' Somehow, through the talking, he captured the atmosphere of the film."

Much of the movie is scored with the same four-note theme, which Zimmer adapted according to the scene's mood and emotion. For the score of 12 Years a Slave, Zimmer conceded, "It's basically a cello and violin score. I wanted to be the secret little bridge that would take the story from the past and move it into the present."

Cellist Tristan Schulze and violinist Ann Marie Calhoun performed on the score in addition to more strings and occasional percussion involved throughout the process. "It was not just getting inside the characters," Zimmer said, "it was getting outside the characters and finding a bridge to the audience." Much of the 38-minute score "creates a stillness, or a tension through the stillness, using very minimal means," he added, although the riverboat ride offers a briefly avant-garde musical contrast, including woodwinds and an unusual use of piano.

The original score was released by Fox Searchlight as part of the For Your Consideration campaign aimed towards members of awards voting groups such as that of the Academy Awards, and the Hollywood Foreign Press of the Golden Globes.

== Track listing ==
All tracks are written by Hans Zimmer

No.	Title	Length
1.	"Solomon Northup"	1:55
2.	"Main Title"	0:28
3.	"Bedtime"	1:35
4.	"Arrival in Washington"	0:24
5.	"Solomon in Chains"	5:03
6.	"Preparing for Travel"	1:00
7.	"Boat Trip to New Orleans"	5:14
8.	"Saragota Flashback"	2:12
9.	"River Rafting Claps"	1:05
10.	"Eliza Flashback"	1:45
11.	"Escape Sequence"	1:19
12.	"Time Passing Sequence"	1:32
13.	"Devastated Crops"	0:51
14.	"Plantation Life (Part A)"	0:59
15.	"Plantation Life (Part B)"	0:56
16.	"Judge Yarney's Ball"	1:10
17.	"Letter Writing"	0:52
18.	"Solomon Burns the Letter"	1:06
19.	"Soap"	3:38
20.	"A Free Man"	2:12
21.	"Nothing to Forgive – End Credits"	3:32
Total length:		38:48

== Reception ==
=== Immediate reception ===
The score was widely admired and thought of as a contender for the Academy Award for Best Original Score at the 86th Academy Awards. Yet, the score failed to receive a nomination for the 86th Academy Awards. However, the film did receive a nomination for the 2013 Golden Globe Award for Best Original Score, as well as a win for the 2013 Washington D.C. Area Film Critics Association Best Score.

=== Critical reception ===
Professional ratings
Review scores
Source	Rating
Film Music Media	5/5 stars
Filmtracks	2/5 stars

Christopher Orr of The Atlantic praised the score most highly stating, "the score by Hans Zimmer represents his best work in years, an eerie, discomfiting soundscape that buzzes like angry locusts and drums like approaching thunder." Mark Kermode of The Observer highlights the significance of music in the piece writing, "More significant still is the role of music (composer Hans Zimmer earned one of the film's 10 Bafta nominations this week), with McQueen building upon the experiments of Shame to explore further the dramatic depths of song" Ed Gonzalez of Slant Magazine praised the score and said "The film's immaculate score, by Hans Zimmer, and sound design, so thick with thunder, wind, the chirping of crickets, hammers beating nails into wood, whips tearing black bodies to shreds, work in tandem to strongly convey the bucolic, sinister atmosphere of the antebellum South."

Gregory Ellwood of HitFix called it "one of Hans Zimmer's more moving scores in some time" Brad Brevet of Rope of Silicon also praised the score in stating, "The best score in a movie I have heard this year has been Hans Zimmer's for 12 Years a Slave." and further stating "It's lovely and threatening at the same time." A.A. Dowd of The A.V. Club wrote of Zimmer's score, "pounds and roars with dread — the appropriate soundtrack for the madness of history." Mark Hughes of Forbes hails the piece as "some of [Zimmer's] best work to date, which says quite a lot" and further expands by expressing "I love the way he uses nontraditional effects and sounds, sometimes going bare-bones and simple with a single instrument, so often understated to perfection."

Susan Wloszczyna of RogerEbert.com stated "Underscoring the cruelty is the aptly unsettling and sometimes discordant soundtrack by Hans Zimmer", noting similarities with Zimmer's predescending score for Inception whilst acknowledging differentiation in "reminiscent of his own strong work on "Inception" but to much different effect". Glenn Kay of CinemaStance wrote positively by stating, "the score by Hans Zimmer is sparse and repetitive, but incredibly effective at invoking an emotional response when it's used." Drew McWeeny of HitFix highly praised the score and said, "The score by Hans Zimmer is just as heart-breaking as the script or the performances."

Nicholas Mennuti of Mulholland Books highly praised the score, calling it one of the best film scores of 2013, stating, "His [Zimmer] work on 12 Years A Slave comes as such a pleasant surprise" and then adding, "Zimmer does what Zimmer does best – he finds the sonic heart of Solomon Northrop ... Try not to be moved by it." Josh Hall of Soton Tab professed of the score, "Another impressive element of 12 Years a Slave is Hans Zimmer's haunting score; it closely accompanies the distressing tragedies on the screen." and added to it further by signifying the importance of music, "Music is a key element of the film; it is ironic that it is Solomon's musical talents that get him captured in the first place." Richard Lawson of The Wire praised the mood of Zimmer's piece by saying, "Hans Zimmer's lush score is at first eerie and foreboding, but by the movie's end has become something approaching a hymn."

== Awards and nominations ==
Award	Date of ceremony	Category	Recipients and nominees	Result
Alliance of Women Film Journalists	December 19, 2013	Best Music or Score	Hans Zimmer	Nominated
Awards Circuit Community Awards	February 28, 2014	Best Original Score	Hans Zimmer	Nominated
Black Reel Awards	February 13, 2014	Best Original Score	Hans Zimmer	Won
Boston Online Film Critics Association	December 7, 2013	Best Original Score	Hans Zimmer	Won
British Academy Film Awards	February 16, 2014	Best Original Music	Hans Zimmer	Nominated
Broadcast Film Critics Association	January 16, 2014	Best Score	Hans Zimmer	Nominated
Central Ohio Film Critics Association	January 2, 2014	Best Score	Hans Zimmer	Nominated
Chicago Film Critics Association	December 16, 2013	Best Original Score	Hans Zimmer	Nominated
Denver Film Critics Society	January 13, 2014	Best Score	Hans Zimmer	Nominated
Georgia Film Critics Association	January 10, 2014	Best Original Score	Hans Zimmer	Nominated
Gold Derby Awards	February 26, 2014	Best Original Score	Hans Zimmer	Nominated
Golden Globe Awards	January 12, 2014	Best Original Score	Hans Zimmer	Nominated
Houston Film Critics Society	December 15, 2013	Best Original Score	Hans Zimmer	Nominated
Indiana Film Critics Association	December 16, 2013	Best Musical Score	Hans Zimmer	Won
International Cinephile Society Awards	February 23, 2014	Best Original Score	Hans Zimmer	Nominated
Las Vegas Film Critics Society	December 18, 2013	Best Original Score	Hans Zimmer	Won
Phoenix Film Critics Society	December 17, 2013	Best Original Score	Hans Zimmer	Nominated
San Diego Film Critics Society	December 11, 2013	Best Original Score	Hans Zimmer	Nominated
Satellite Awards	February 23, 2014	Best Original Score	Hans Zimmer	Nominated
St. Louis Gateway Film Critics Association	December 16, 2013	Best Musical Score	Hans Zimmer	Nominated
Stockholm International Film Festival	November 14, 2013	Best Film Music	Hans Zimmer	Won
Washington D.C. Area Film Critics Association	December 9, 2013	Best Score	Hans Zimmer	Won
