= Welcome to Jamrock (song) =

2005 single by Damian Marley

Single by Damian Marley

from the album Welcome to Jamrock
- Released: March 14, 2005
- Genre: Reggae; hip hop
- Length: 3:33
- Label: Tuff Gong/Universal/Ghetto Youths
- Songwriter: Damian Marley
- Producer: Stephen Marley

Damian Marley singles chronology
"Welcome to Jamrock" (2005)	"The Master Has Come Back" (2005)

"Welcome to Jamrock" is a song by Jamaican reggae artist Damian Marley. It was released in March 2005 as the lead single from his album of the same name. The song was listed at number 270 on Pitchfork Media's "Top 500 songs of the 2000s". The song is featured in FIFA 06, Midnight Club 3: DUB Edition Remix, FIFA 23 and The Sims 2: Bon Voyage where it is recorded in the game's fictional Simlish language.

== Background ==
The song covers issues such as crime, poverty and political corruption as part of the harsh reality of "Jamrock", Marley's personification of Jamaica, as opposed to the Jamaica advertised as a popular tourist destination. Marley laments Jamaica's high crime rate and increasing violence, demanding that those in charge do something about it. In this sense he carries on the legacy of his father before him, in inspiring Jamaicans to stand together.

Both the rhythm (known as "World Jam") and the hook are sampled from the 1984 track "World-A-Reggae" by Ini Kamoze − the original rhythm from the Ini Kamoze album was provided by Sly and Robbie.

== Track listings ==
UK - CD: 1

1. "Roshien"
2. "Welcome to Jamrock"
3. "Jr. Gong the Dreadful"

UK - CD: 2

1. "Welcome to Jamrock"
2. "Jr. Gong the Dreadful"
3. "Lyrical .44"
4. "Welcome to Jamrock" (video)

== Awards ==
Damian Marley won the Grammy Award for Best Urban/Alternative Performance at the 48th Grammy Awards in 2006 for "Welcome to Jamrock".

== Charts ==
Chart (2005)	Peak position
Hungary (Single Top 40)	28
Netherlands (Single Top 100)	76
UK Singles (Official Charts)	13
U.S. Billboard Hot 100	55
U.S. Billboard Hot R&B/Hip-Hop Songs	18
U.S. Billboard Hot Rap Tracks	12

== Certifications ==
Region	Certification	Certified units/sales
Brazil (Pro-Música Brasil)	Gold	30,000^{‡}
United Kingdom (BPI)	Platinum	600,000^{‡}
^{‡} Sales+streaming figures based on certification alone.

== Alicia Keys version ==
"Love It or Leave It Alone / Welcome to Jamrock"

Song by Alicia Keys

from the album Unplugged
- Recorded: July 4, 2005
- Venue: Brooklyn Academy of Music
- Genre: R&B
- Length: 6:42
- Label: J
- Songwriters: Lorenzo DeChalus; Derek Murphy; Charles Davis; Kirk Khaleel; Joseph Williams; Damian Marley; Stephen Marley; Ini Kamoze
- Producer: Alicia Keys

"Welcome to Jamrock" was recorded by American recording artist Alicia Keys for her first live album Unplugged (2005). Entitled "Love It or Leave It Alone/Welcome to Jamrock", Keys recorded the song as part of a medley, which appears as the last track of the album. "Love It or Leave It Alone" features hip hop recording artists Common and Mos Def and "Welcome to Jamrock" features Damian Marley. Additionally, "Love It or Leave It Alone" contains a sample of "Love Me or Leave Me Alone" by Brand Nubian, written by Lorenzo DeChalus, Derek Murphy and Charles Davis and "Latoya" by Just-Ice, written by Kirk Khaleel and Joseph Williams. On working with Alicia Keys on Unplugged, Damian Marley said that "I'm a fan of her music. What I really appreciate about her music is the whole live aspect. She's very hands-on and musical. Reggae musicians appreciate that because we use more live instrumentation".

The song was generally well received by music critics in their reviews for Unplugged. Matilda Egere-Cooper from BBC Music called it the "grand finale" of the album while Anthony Carew from Neumu called it a "jamboree finale". Robert Hilburn from Los Angeles Times felt that Keys gave a "vigorous rendition" of the song. According to Roberta Penn of Seattle Post-Intelligencer, the "closing medley of "Love It or Leave It Alone" and "Welcome to Jamrock [...] is a fabulous love fest". Thomas Inskeep from Stylus Magazine described it as a "big hip-hop jam", but was not pleased with the song, writing "Clearly, Keys is trying to lighten up with this, but it comes off as basically a “Look at my cool celebrity friends!” move. Musically uninspiring, this medley feels and sounds tacked-on". Writing for Entertainment Weekly, David Browne simply commented that "a left-field cameo by Damian Marley on a cover of his hit ”Welcome to Jamrock” just feels opportunistic". Rolling Stone reviewer Christian Hoard felt that with the multiple guest artists on the song, Keys "is sort of like trying to spice up a cocktail party by trotting out Noam Chomsky".
