= Welcome to Jamrock =

Studio album by Damian "Jr. Gong" Marley
- Released: September 12, 2005
- Studio: Lion's Den, Miami, Florida, United States; Marley Music, Kingston, Jamaica; Tuff Gong, Kingston, Jamaica
- Genre: Reggae; dancehall
- Length: 62:54
- Label: Ghetto Youths International/Tuff Gong; Universal Records
- Producer: Damian "Jr. Gong" Marley; Stephen Marley

Damian "Jr. Gong" Marley chronology
Halfway Tree (2001)	Welcome to Jamrock (2005)	Distant Relatives (2010)

Singles from Welcome to Jamrock
- 1. "Welcome to Jamrock" Released: March 14, 2005; 2. "Road To Zion" Released: 2005; 3. "The Master Has Come Back" Released: December 12, 2005; 4. "Beautiful" Released: January 24, 2006

Welcome to Jamrock is the third studio album by Jamaican reggae/dancehall artist Damian "Jr. Gong" Marley. The album was released on September 12, 2005, in the United Kingdom, and one day later in the United States.

Marley won two 2006 Grammy Awards for the album, Best Reggae Album and Best Urban/Alternative Performance (for the track "Welcome to Jamrock"). Guests appearing on the album include Stephen Marley, Black Thought, Bobby Brown and Nas.

== Recording ==
Production of the album was handled by Damian and his brother Stephen Marley. The pair had frequently collaborated, with Damian wanting to utilise the professionals already in his family. The album's title track was inspired by the everyday life of Jamaica that the world does not know about. The title was a play on a song entitled "Welcome to Atlanta", which discussed the dark side of Atlanta. Inspired by this Marley wanted to showcase what it was like to live in a "third world country."

== Reception ==
=== Chart performance ===
Professional ratings
Review scores
Source	Rating
AllMusic	4/5 stars
Christgau's Consumer Guide	A−
Entertainment Weekly	A−
Mojo	4/5 stars
Now	3/5 stars
The Observer	5/5 stars
Pitchfork	7.7/10
Rolling Stone	3.5/5 stars
Spin	7/10
Tom Hull – on the Web	A−

The album debuted at number 7 on the Billboard 200, and sold 86,000 copies, during its first week of release in the United States. As of August 23, 2006, Welcome to Jamrock has sold 539,000 recognized copies in the United States. Between September 2005 and 2007, the album spent more than 30 weeks at the top of the Billboard Reggae Albums chart. In January 2022, it re-entered the chart at number 10.

The title-track peaked at number 55 in the US on the Billboard Hot 100, but did better on the R&B and rap charts, peaking at numbers 18 and 12, respectively. It also did well in the UK, peaking at number 13.

=== Critical reception ===
Steve Yates, in The Observer, gave the album five stars out of five, concluding that "Like his father, Damian is tucked in well behind the cutting edge of digital production, but this fine collection of songs outshines the ephemeral delights of modern day dancehall. The Jr Gong is banging."

David Jeffries, writing for AllMusic, gave the album four stars out of five, saying, "Besides the fantastic single, this album has 'legs,' with a bulging lyric sheet filled with vivid and crafty lines that offer plenty to focus on once all the sonic brilliance has sunk in. A career-defining moment that lives up to a huge hit, Welcome to Jamrock is a tremendous achievement."

== Track listing ==
All tracks are produced by Stephen Marley and Damian Marley, except where noted.

No.	Title	Writer(s)	Producer(s)	Length
1.	"Confrontation" (featuring spoken introduction from Bunny Wailer)	Damian Marley; Stephen Marley; Paul Scott Levy		5:29
2.	"There for You"	D. Marley; S. Marley; Levy		4:41
3.	"Welcome to Jamrock"	D. Marley; S. Marley; Ini Kamoze; Robert Russell		3:33
4.	"The Master Has Come Back"	D. Marley; S. Marley; Neville Livingston		4:40
5.	"All Night" (featuring Stephen Marley)	D. Marley; S. Marley; Jackie Mittoo; Clement Dodd		3:30
6.	"Beautiful" (featuring Bobby Brown)	D. Marley; Bobby Brown; S. Marley; Paul Yebuah	Stephen Marley; Paul Yebuah	4:47
7.	"Pimpa's Paradise" (featuring Stephen Marley and Black Thought)	Bob Marley; D. Marley; Black Thought		5:04
8.	"Move!"	B. Marley; D. Marley; S. Marley		3:44
9.	"For the Babies" (featuring Stephen Marley)	D. Marley; S. Marley		4:53
10.	"Hey Girl" (featuring Stephen Marley and Rovleta Fraser)	D. Marley; S. Marley; Yebuah	Stephen Marley; Paul Yebuah	4:14
11.	"Road to Zion" (featuring Nas)	Irving Berlin		5:17
12.	"We're Gonna Make It"	D. Marley; S. Marley; Jimmy Riley		4:20
13.	"In 2 Deep"	D. Marley; Michael Jones	Mighty Mike; Stephen Marley (add.); Damian Marley (add.)	4:44
14.	"Khaki Suit" (featuring Bounty Killer and Eek-A-Mouse)	D. Marley; Rodney Price; Ripton Hylton; Henry Lawes; Richard Smith; S. Marley		3:57
15.	"Carnal Mind" (bonus track) (featuring Chew Stick)			4:26

== Personnel ==
Credits adapted from AllMusic.

- Chris Athens – Mastering
- Cristy Barber – A&R
- Black Thought – Guest Artist, Primary Artist
- Bounty Killer – Guest Artist, Primary Artist
- Bobby Brown – Guest Artist, Primary Artist
- Errol Brown – Mixing
- Jill Capone – Product Manager
- James "Bonzai" Caruso – Engineer, Keyboards, Mixing
- Commissioner Gordon – Mixing
- Shiah Coore – Bass, Keyboards
- Gary Corbett – Keyboards
- Noel Davey – Hammond organ, Piano
- Sean Diedrick – Keyboards
- Eek-A-Mouse – Guest Artist, Primary Artist
- Paul Fakhourie – Bass, Clavinet, Keyboards
- Dean Fraser – Saxophone
- Rovleta Fraser – Primary Artist, Backing vocals
- Deron D. James – Cover Design
- Jazzwad – Bass, Drum Programming, Drums, Keyboards
- Joanne "Joey" Joseph – A&R
- King Swamp – Vocals
- Kevin Law – A&R
- Marc Stephen Lee – Engineer
- Bob Marley – Composer
- Damian Marley – Composer, Drum Programming, Executive Producer, Keyboards, Primary Artist, Producer
- Julian Marley – Hammond organ
- Stephen Marley – Bass, Composer, Executive Producer, Guitar, Keyboards, Percussion, Primary Artist, Producer, Synthesizer
- Roland McDermott – Engineer
- Gregory J. Morris – Engineer
- Nas – Guest Artist, Primary Artist
- Stephen "Asher" Noel – Bass, Guitar
- Alfredo Oliva – Concertmaster
- R. Price – Composer
- Ras Kass – Concept Graphics
- Don Reid – A&R
- Owen "Dreadie" Reid – Bass
- The Roots – Guest Artist
- Kenneth Roxborough – Backing vocals
- R. Russell – Composer
- Keith Tamashiro – Art Direction
- Craig "Niteman" Taylor – Drum Fills, Drums
- Franklin Thompson – Backing vocals
- Uziah "Sticky" Thompson – Percussion
- Dan Warner – Guitar
- Larry Warrilow – String Arrangements
- Roselyn Williams – Backing vocals

== Samples ==
- "Confrontation" contains spoken-word samples from speeches made by Haile Selassie I and Marcus Garvey. The music contains a sample from the entrance music of former WCW wrestler Bill Goldberg.
- "Road to Zion" contains a sample from "Russian Lullaby" by Ella Fitzgerald.
- "Move!" contains a sample from "Exodus" by Bob Marley & The Wailers.
- "Welcome to Jamrock" contains a sample from "World a Music" by Ini Kamoze.
- "The Master Has Come Back" contains a sample from "Bide Up" by Bunny Wailer.
- "All Night" contains a sample from "Nimrod" by The Skatalites.
- "There for You" contains a sample from "Heartbreak Hotel" by the Jacksons.
- "Khaki Suit" contains a sample from "For Hire and Removal" by Eek-A-Mouse.

== Charts ==
=== Weekly charts ===
Chart (2005)	Peak position
Dutch Albums (Album Top 100)	58
French Albums (SNEP)	188
US Billboard 200	7
US Top R&B/Hip-Hop Albums (Billboard)	4
US Reggae Albums (Billboard)	1

=== Year-end charts ===
Chart (2006)	Position
US Top R&B/Hip-Hop Albums (Billboard)	87

== Certifications ==
Certifications for Welcome To Jamrock
Region	Certification	Certified units/sales
Canada (Music Canada)	Gold	50,000^{^}
New Zealand (RMNZ)	2× Platinum	60,000^{‡}
United Kingdom (BPI)	Gold	100,000^{^}
United States (RIAA)	Gold	500,000^{^}
^{^} Shipments figures based on certification alone.^{‡} Sales+streaming figures based on certification alone.
