= Damian Marley =

Jamaican reggae musician (born 1978)

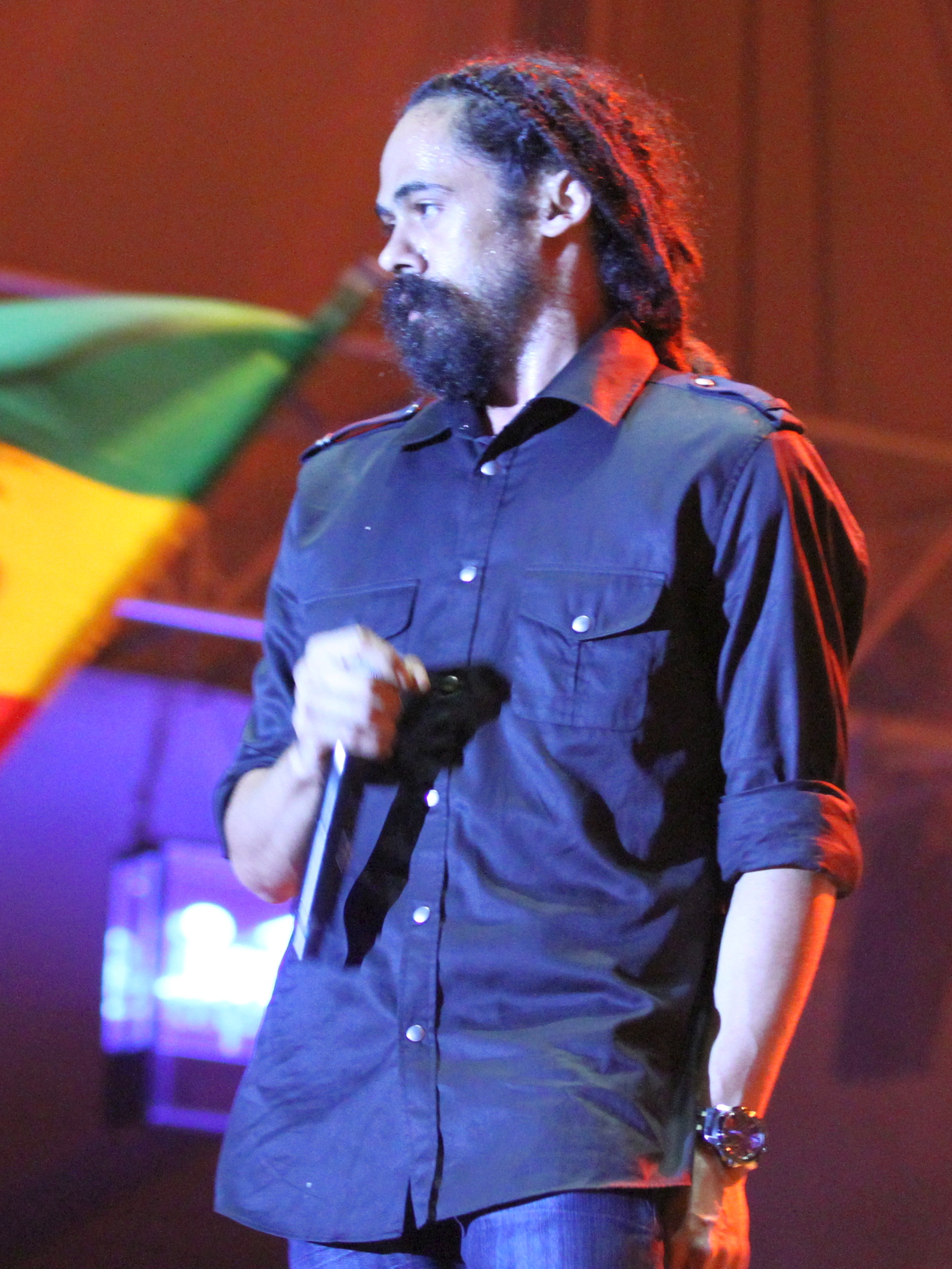
- Marley performing in 2015

Background information
- Also known as: Jr. Gong
- Born: Damian Robert Nesta Marley; 21 July 1978 (age 48); Kingston, Jamaica
- Genres: Reggae; reggae fusion; hip-hop; dancehall
- Occupations: Deejay; singer; songwriter
- Years active: 1992–present
- Labels: Tuff Gong; Ghetto Youth International; Motown; Republic

Damian Robert Nesta Marley (born 21 July 1978) is a Jamaican reggae singer. The youngest son of Bob Marley, he is the recipient of four Grammy Awards.

== Early life, education and family ==
Damian is the youngest son of legendary reggae singer Bob Marley. He is the only child born to Marley and Cindy Breakspeare, a Jamaican jazz singer crowned Miss World 1976. Like several of Bob's children, Damian was born out of wedlock and outside of Bob's marriage to singer Rita Marley. After seeing the film Damien – Omen II, which is about the coming of the Antichrist, one of Bob's last requests in Germany was to have Damian's name changed. "Damien being a devil... It was inappropriate for him as a Rastafarian to have a child with that name," Bob said and Damian's name was later changed.

Damian was two years old when his father died. His nickname "Junior Gong" is derived from his father's nickname of "Tuff Gong".

On Saturday, 7 November 2026 Damian Marley received a Doctor of Letters (DLitt) from the University of the West Indies (UWI), Mona, in recognition of his contributions to Caribbean culture and music. The honorary degree was conferred during the university's 2026 graduation ceremony.

== Career ==
=== Early releases (1992–2004) ===
At the age of 13, Marley formed a musical group by the name of the Shepherds, which included the daughter of Freddie McGregor and son of Third World's Cat Coore. The group opened the 1992 Reggae Sunsplash festival. The band fell apart in the early 1990s, and Damian started his solo career.

With the backing of his father's label, Tuff Gong, he released his 1996 debut album Mr. Marley, which surprised many who were unaccustomed to hearing a Marley deejaying rather than singing. Marley released his second studio album Halfway Tree. The name "Halfway Tree" comes from his mother Cindy Breakspeare being from the rich part of town, and his father Bob Marley coming from the poor part of town, thus him being "a tree halfway in between the 'rich' world and 'poor' world". Additionally, Halfway Tree is a well-known landmark that marks the cultural centre of Half-Way-Tree, the clock tower that stands where the historical eponymous cotton tree once stood is featured prominently behind Marley on the cover of the album. The album was released on 11 September 2001 and received the 2002 Grammy Award for Best Reggae Album. It was co-produced by Damian Marley and his brother Stephen Marley, who had also produced Damian's debut album Mr. Marley.

=== Welcome to Jamrock (2005) ===
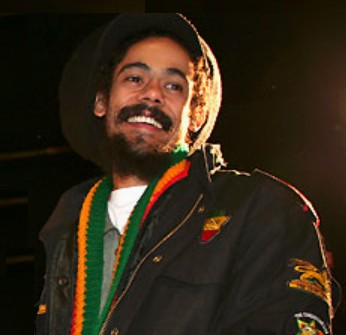
Marley in 2007

Marley released his third studio album Welcome to Jamrock which was released on 12 September 2005 in the United States and 13 September 2005 in the United Kingdom. The album sold 86,000 copies in its first week of release, and was eventually certified gold after selling 500,000 copies in the United States.

Damian's half-brother, Stephen Marley, was a producer and co-writer of the hugely successful song of the same name. The lyrics to the single "Welcome to Jamrock", which was performed over a riddim produced by Sly and Robbie for Ini Kamoze some 20 years earlier, centered around poverty, politics and crime in Jamaica. While the single was controversial at home over its perceived negative viewpoint of the island, many praised the content of the song. Dr Clinton Hutton, professor at the University of the West Indies, said of the single: "'Jamrock' uses the icon of the inner city, of alienation, of despair, of prejudice, but of hope, of Jamaican identity, to remind us of the fire of frustration, the fire of creativity, the fire of warning to open up our eyes and look within to the life we are living. And still some of us don't want to hear and to look and say enough is enough." The single reached number 13 on the UK Singles Chart and number 55 on the US Billboard Hot 100 chart. It was also number 100 on the Top 100 Songs of the Decade listing by Rolling Stone.

Other notable singles from the album include "The Master Has Come Back", "Road to Zion" featuring Nas, and "Khaki Suit" featuring Bounty Killer and Eek-A-Mouse.

=== Distant Relatives (2006–2010) ===
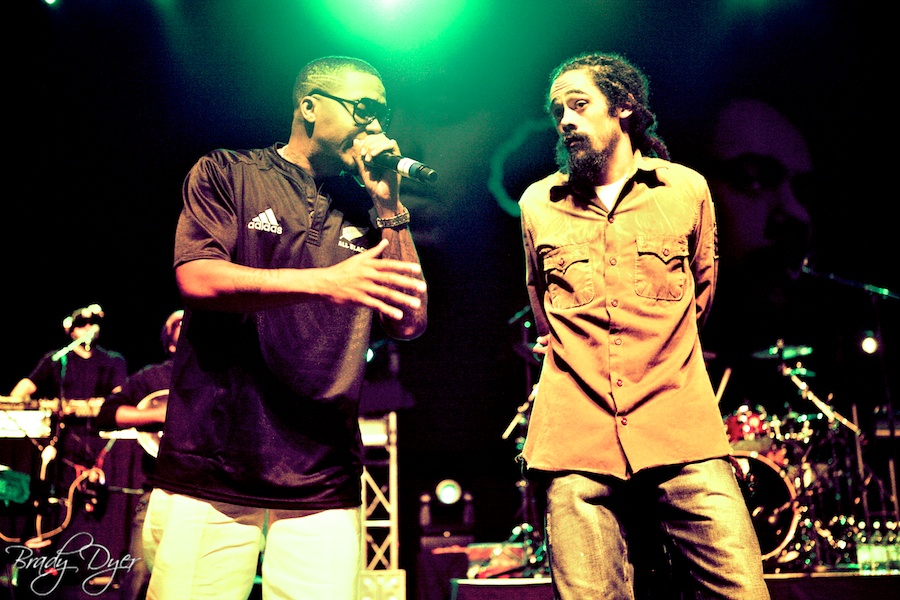
Nas and Marley performing in Wellington, New Zealand, 2011

At the 2006 Grammy Awards, he won Best Reggae Album and Best Urban/Alternative Performance for Welcome to Jamrock. He is the only Jamaican reggae artist in history to win two Grammy Awards on the same night. He is also the only reggae artist to win in the Best Urban/Alternative Performance category at the Grammy Awards. In 2008, he made an appearance on singer Mariah Carey's E=MC² album as a featured artist on the album track "Cruise Control". At the 2009 Grammy Awards news of a collaborative album between Marley and Nas was announced, when Nas told MTV reporters: "Right now, I'll tell you first, I'm working on an album with Damian Marley. We tryin' to build some schools in Africa with this one, and trying to build empowerment. We're tryin' to show love and stuff with this album. So, the record's ... all about really the 'hood and Africa also as well."

On 17 May 2010, Marley released Distant Relatives, a collaborative album with Nas. The album title refers not only to the bond between the artists but the connection to their African ancestry, which inspired the album both musically and lyrically. They have previously collaborated on "Road to Zion", on Marley's Welcome to Jamrock album. The album joins two different flavours of music with Marley's dub-rock aesthetic and Nas' flow. Damian and Stephen produced much of the album. The proceeds of this album will go to building schools in the Congo.

The album debuted at number five on the US Billboard 200 chart with first-week sales of 57,000 copies. It serves as Nas's tenth top-ten album and Marley's second top-ten album in the United States. The album also entered at number four on Billboard's Digital Albums, and at number one on its R&B/Hip-Hop Albums, Rap Albums, and Reggae Albums charts. Internationally, Distant Relatives attained some chart success. It entered at number 33 on the European Top 100 Albums chart. In the United Kingdom, it debuted at number 30 on the UK Albums Chart and at number four on the R&B Albums Chart. In Canada, the album entered at number 9 on the Top 100 Albums chart. In Germany, it debuted at number 38 on the Media Control Charts.

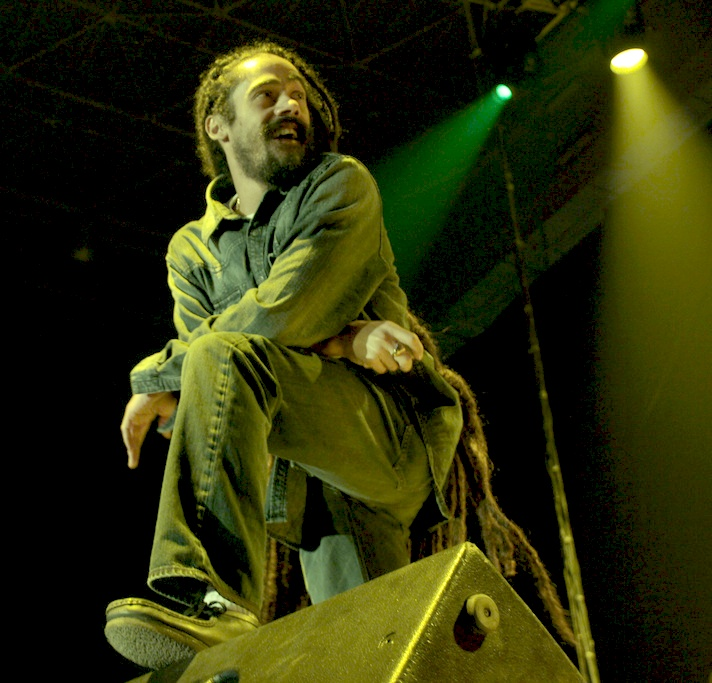
Marley in 2010

The first single, "As We Enter", was released on iTunes on 23 February 2010. It peaked at number 10 on the iTunes Hip Hop/Rap charts and number 41 on the iTunes Music charts. The single debuted at number 39 on the UK Singles Chart. At a sold-out panel discussion on the African diaspora and its relation to music, sponsored by National Geographic, Damian and Stephen Marley and Nas were among the several hip-hop and reggae musicians voicing their solidarity. The discussion focused on the collaborations between artists of the two genres, and highlighted the Distant Relatives project.

=== SuperHeavy (2011–2015) ===
The existence of SuperHeavy was secret until May 2011. Mick Jagger, English musician and the lead vocalist of rock band The Rolling Stones, announced its formation on 20 May 2011. SuperHeavy was Dave Stewart's idea. Inspired by the sounds washing into his home in Saint Ann's Bay, Jamaica, Stewart urged Jagger to fuse their sound with that of Indian orchestras. Stewart and Jagger had mutual liking for Indian orchestrations; thus, A. R. Rahman was added to the supergroup, as well as British singer Joss Stone. The name of the band is said to be inspired by Muhammad Ali. The group began recording their self-titled debut album in early 2009 at a studio in Los Angeles. They recorded about 35 hours of music. The album was previewed at Jim Henson Studios, Los Angeles, on 30 June 2011. The band played eight of the recorded songs at the event.

"Miracle Worker" was released on iTunes as the album's lead single on 7 July 2011. It is a reggae song performed by Marley, Stone and Jagger. The single entered at number 195 on the UK Singles Chart. The music video was released on YouTube on 12 August 2011. Directed by Stewart and filmed at Paramount Studios in Los Angeles, the video features all five members of the band. "Satyameva Jayathe" (the national motto of India, which literally translates as "Truth Alone Triumphs") was released as the second single from the album on 9 August 2011, a week before India's Independence Day on 15 August. Composed by Rahman to have an Indian feel, Jagger sings in Sanskrit on the song, which also features Stewart, Stone and Marley. The song premiered exclusively on Radio Mirchi 98.3 FM on 9 August across twenty-two Indian cities, and Tata DoCoMo is set to simultaneously promote the song and the album on mass media. "Beautiful People" reached number 64 on the Dutch Single Top 100 chart.

Damian also worked with electronic artist Skrillex on a song called "Make It Bun Dem" in 2012. This song also appears in the 2012 game Far Cry 3. Affairs of the Heart was a massive hit in Jamaica, topping the reggae charts.

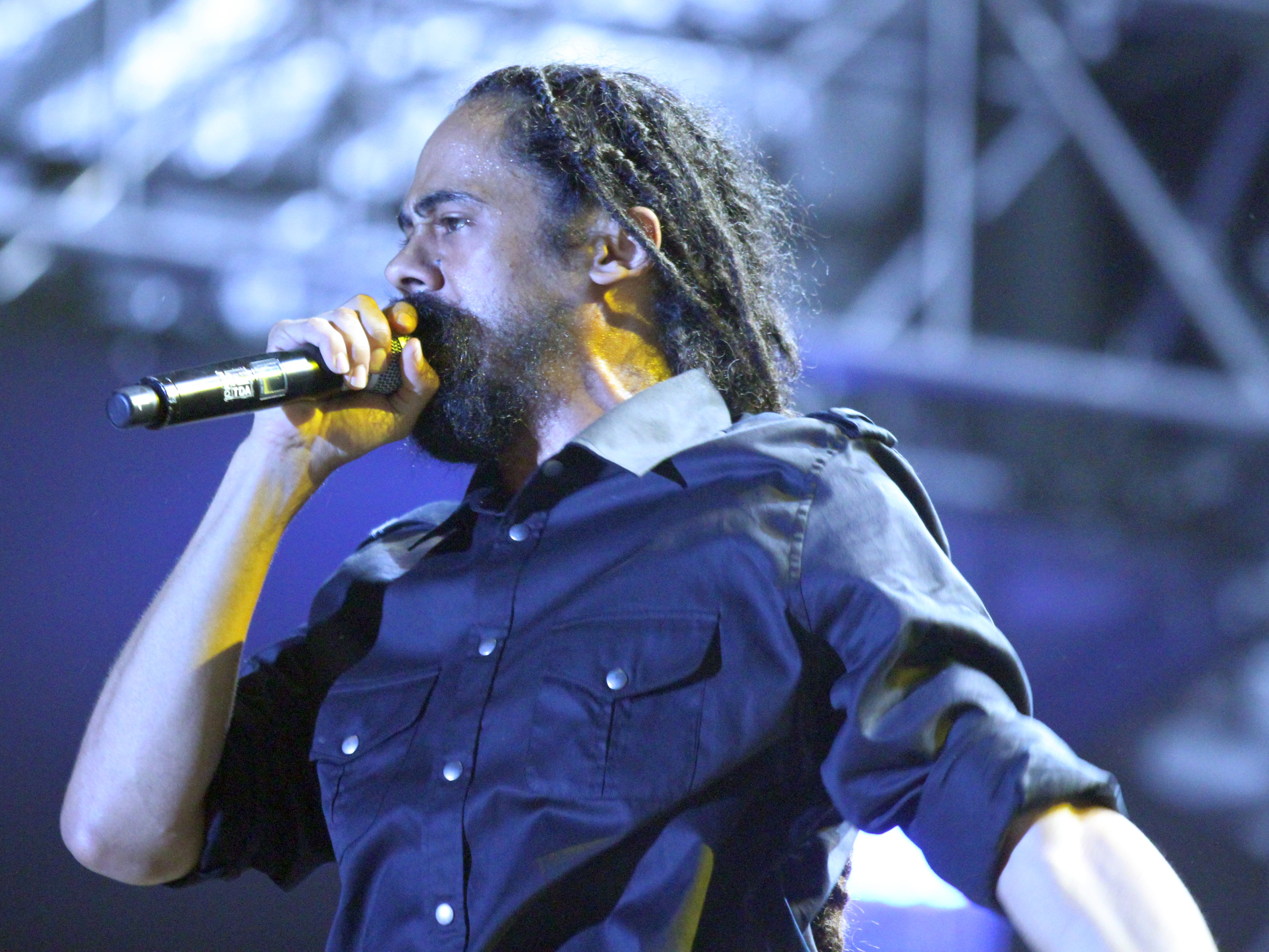
Marley in 2015

=== Stony Hill (2017–present) ===
Damian Marley released his fourth studio album, Stony Hill, in July 2017. Its first single "Nail Pon Cross" was released in August 2016. The album won the Grammy Award for Best Reggae Album at the 60th Annual Grammy Awards.

== Musical style ==
Marley has described his music as "dancehall and reggae. I've noticed ... people trying to separate the two of them", he continues. "It's Jamaican culture in general. I don't try to classify or separate." Distant Relatives fused hip hop and reggae musical elements, Marley and Nas also incorporated samples from African music into the album. The album's lyrical content heavily revolves around themes concerning Africa, from ancestry and poverty, with social commentary of the United States and Africa. The track "Count Your Blessings" reflects on the plight of Africa.

== Discography ==
=== Studio albums ===
List of studio albums, with selected details, chart positions and certifications
Title	Details	Peak chart positions							Certifications
Title	Details	US	US R&B	US Rap	US Reg.	FRA	SWI	UK	Certifications
Mr. Marley	Released: 9 September 1996; Label: Tuff Gong; Format: CD, digital download	—	—	—	2	—	—	—	
Halfway Tree	Released: 11 September 2001; Label: Universal Motown; Format: CD, digital download	—	—	—	2	—	—	—	
Welcome to Jamrock	Released: 13 September 2005; Label: Universal; Format: CD, digital download	7	4	3	1	188	—	34	BPI: Gold; MC: Gold; RIAA: Gold; RMNZ: 2× Platinum
Stony Hill	Released: 21 July 2017; Label: Republic; Format: CD, digital download	65	—	—	1	104	26	94	

=== Collaborative releases ===
Year	Album details	Peak chart positions					Certifications
Year	Album details	US	US R&B	US Rap	US Reg.	FRA	Certifications
2010	Distant Relatives (with Nas): Released: 18 May 2010; Label: Universal Republic; Format: CD	5	1	1	1	27	BPI: Silver
2011	SuperHeavy (with SuperHeavy): Released: 16 September 2011; Label: A&M; Format: CD	26	—	—	—	—	
2013	Set Up Shop Vol. 1 (with various artists): Released: 19 February 2013; Label: Ghetto Youths International; Format: CD	—	—	—	—	—	
2014	Set Up Shop Vol. 2 (with various artists): Released: 23 December 2014; Label:Ghetto Youths international; Format: CD	—	—	—	—	—	
2015	Set Up Shop Vol. 3 (with various artists): Released: 22 December 2015; Label: Ghetto Youths International; Format: CD	—	—	—	—	—	
"—" denotes releases that did not chart.

=== Singles ===
List of singles as main artist, with selected chart positions, showing year released and album name
Title	Year	Peak chart positions										Certifications	Album
Title	Year	JAM Air.	US	US R&B	US Rap	AUS	CAN	FRA	NZ	SWE	UK	Certifications	Album
"Welcome to Jamrock"	2005	*	55	18	12	—	—	—	—	—	13	BPI: Platinum; RMNZ: 2× Platinum	Welcome to Jamrock
"The Master Has Come Back"	2005	*	—	—	—	—	—	—	—	—	74		Welcome to Jamrock
"Road to Zion" (featuring Nas)	2005	*	—	57	—	—	—	—	—	—	—	BPI: Silver; RMNZ: Gold	Welcome to Jamrock
"Beautiful" (featuring Bobby Brown)	2006	*	—	—	—	—	—	—	—	—	39		Welcome to Jamrock
"All Night" (featuring Stephen Marley)	2006	*	—	—	—	—	—	—	—	—	79		Welcome to Jamrock
"As We Enter" (Nas and Damian Marley)	2010	*	116	18	16	—	—	—	—	—	39		Distant Relatives
"Nah Mean" (Nas and Damian Marley)	2011	*	—	—	—	—	—	—	—	—	—		Distant Relatives
"Set Up Shop"	2011	*	—	—	—	—	—	—	—	—	—		Set Up Shop Vol. 1
"Affairs of the Heart"	2012	*	—	—	—	—	—	—	—	—	—		Set Up Shop Vol. 1
"Make It Bun Dem" (Skrillex and Damian Marley)	2012	*	106	—	—	27	34	87	16	48	58	ARIA: 2× Platinum; BPI: Gold; MC: Gold; RIAA: Platinum; RMNZ: 2× Platinum	Non-album single
"Hard Work"	2014	*	—	—	—	—	—	—	—	—	—		Set Up Shop Vol. 2
"Nail Pon Cross"	2016	*	—	—	—	—	—	—	—	—	—		Stony Hill
"Medication" (featuring Stephen Marley)	2017	*	—	—	—	—	—	—	—	—	—	RMNZ: 2× Platinum	Stony Hill
"Living It Up"	2018	*	—	—	—	—	—	—	—	—	—	RMNZ: Gold	Stony Hill
"1 Psalm" (with Masicka)	2026	3	—	—	—	—	—	—	—	—	—		Forever Reign
"—" denotes a recording that did not chart or was not released in that territory. "*" denotes that the chart did not exist at that time.

==== As featured artist ====
List of singles as featured artist, with selected chart positions, showing year released and album name
Year	Title	Peak chart positions		Album
Year	Title	JAM Air.	UK	Album
"Now That You Got It" (Gwen Stefani featuring Damian Marley)	2007	*	59	The Sweet Escape
"Can't Keep Me Down" (Cypress Hill and Rusko featuring Damian Marley)	2012	*	—	Cypress X Rusko
"Riot" (Sean Paul featuring Damian Marley)	2013	*	—	Full Frequency
"So Am I" (Ty Dolla Sign featuring Damian Marley and Skrillex)	2017	*	—	Beach House 3
"Love With A Quality" (Karol G featuring Damian Marley)	2019	*	—	Ocean
"What Do You Say" (Common and PJ featuring Damian Marley)	2021	*	—	A Beautiful Revolution Part II
"No Fear" (Sean Paul featuring Damian Marley and Nicky Jam)	2022	*	—	Scorcha
"Good Morning" (450 featuring Damian Marley)	2026	6	—	Non-album single
"—" denotes a recording that did not chart or was not released in that territory. "*" denotes that the chart did not exist at that time.

=== Other charted songs ===
Year	Song	Peak chart positions		Album	Certifications
Year	Song	US	CAN	Album	Certifications
2010	"Liquor Store Blues" (Bruno Mars featuring Damian Marley)	105	97	Doo-Wops & Hooligans	RIAA: Gold
2017	"Bam" (Jay-Z featuring Damian Marley)	47	—	4:44	
