= SuperHeavy (album) =

Studio album by SuperHeavy
- Released: 16 September 2011
- Studio: Henson (Los Angeles); Octopus (Mediterranean, Red and Ionian Seas); Circle House (Miami) (Note: Additional recording); Panchathan Record Inn (Chennai, India) (Note: Vocals on "Satyameva Jayathe"); Panchathan Hollywood (Los Angeles) (Note: Additional choir on "Satyameva Jayathe")
- Length: 52:56
- Label: A&M
- Producer: Mick Jagger; Dave Stewart

Singles from SuperHeavy
- 1. "Miracle Worker" Released: 7 July 2011; 2. "Satyameva Jayathe" Released: 9 August 2011

Professional ratings
Aggregate scores
Source	Rating
Metacritic	52/100
Review scores
Source	Rating
AllMusic	2.5/5 stars
The A.V. Club	D
The Daily Telegraph	3/5 stars
Entertainment Weekly	B−
The Guardian	3/5 stars
The Independent	2/5 stars
Los Angeles Times	3/4 stars
Now	4/5 stars
The Observer	1/5 stars
Rolling Stone	4/5 stars

SuperHeavy is the only album by the rock supergroup SuperHeavy. It was released on 16 September 2011 by A&M Records.

== Background and recording ==
The SuperHeavy project began in 2009. In early 2009, Mick Jagger, Dave Stewart, Joss Stone, Damian Marley and A. R. Rahman experimented at a studio in Los Angeles, trying to "write songs which had meaning". They had a couple more sessions after that trying to perfect every song that was written. Jagger stated in an interview that "they had entered with just ideas, a few guitar riffs and a few snippets of lyrics... which isn't his usual style of working, but music evolved quickly."

The majority of the album was recorded at Jim Henson Studios in Los Angeles, with parts recorded off the coasts of Greece and Turkey on the Octopus, a megayacht owned by Microsoft co-founder Paul Allen.

== Release and promotion ==
The band gathered at Jim Henson Studios in Los Angeles on 30 June 2011 to preview the album. The preview began with a short documentary showing SuperHeavy recording at the studio. The group played eight of the recorded songs at the event.

== Singles ==
"Miracle Worker" was released as the album's lead single on 7 July 2011. It is a reggae song performed by Marley, Stone and Jagger. The single peaked at number 136 on the UK singles chart. The music video was released on YouTube on 12 August 2011. Directed by Stewart and filmed at Paramount Studios in Los Angeles, the video features all five members of the band.

"Satyameva Jayathe" (named after the national motto of India, which literally translates to "Truth Alone Triumphs") was released as the second single from the album on 9 August 2011, a week before India's Independence Day on 15 August. Composed by Rahman to have an Indian feel, Jagger sings in Sanskrit on the song, which also features Stewart, Stone and Marley. The song premiered exclusively on Radio Mirchi 98.3 FM on 9 August across 22 Indian cities, and Tata DoCoMo was set to simultaneously promote the song and the album on mass media.

"Beautiful People" reached number 64 on the Dutch Single Top 100 chart.

== Track listing ==
No.	Title	Writer(s)	Length
1.	"SuperHeavy"	Mick Jagger; Dave Stewart; Joss Stone; Damian Marley; A. R. Rahman	5:05
2.	"Unbelievable"	Jagger; Stewart; Stone; Marley; Rahman	3:50
3.	"Miracle Worker"	Jagger; Stewart; Stone; Marley; Rahman	4:09
4.	"Energy"	Jagger; Stewart; Stone; Marley	3:42
5.	"Satyameva Jayathe"	Stone; Marley; Rahman	4:07
6.	"One Day One Night"	Jagger; Stewart; Stone; Marley; Rahman	4:37
7.	"Never Gonna Change"	Jagger; Stewart	4:23
8.	"Beautiful People"	Jagger; Stewart; Stone; Marley; Rahman	5:00
9.	"Rock Me Gently"	Stewart; Stone; Marley	6:00
10.	"I Can't Take It No More"	Jagger	3:21
11.	"I Don't Mind"	Jagger; Stewart; Stone; Marley	4:59
12.	"World Keeps Turning"	Jagger; Stewart; Stone; Marley	3:43
Total length:			52:56

Deluxe edition bonus tracks
No.	Title	Writer(s)	Length
13.	"Mahiya"	Rahman; Stone; Marley	3:26
14.	"Warring People"	Jagger; Stewart; Stone; Marley; Rahman	5:05
15.	"Common Ground"	Jagger; Stewart; Stone; Marley	3:43
16.	"Hey Captain"	Jagger; Stewart; Stone; Marley	3:33
17.	"Miracle Worker" (Ashley Beedle's Warbox Remix; iTunes Store bonus track)	Jagger; Stewart; Stone; Marley; Rahman	5:30

Japanese deluxe edition bonus track
No.	Title	Writer(s)	Length
17.	"Never Gonna Change" (acoustic)	Jagger; Stewart

== Charts ==
=== Weekly charts ===
Weekly chart performance for SuperHeavy
Chart (2011)	Peak position
Australian Albums (ARIA)	72
Austrian Albums (Ö3 Austria)	1
Belgian Albums (Ultratop Flanders)	14
Belgian Albums (Ultratop Wallonia)	10
Canadian Albums (Nielsen SoundScan)	32
Croatian Albums (HDU)	26
Czech Albums (ČNS IFPI)	38
Danish Albums (Hitlisten)	9
Dutch Albums (Album Top 100)	1
French Albums (SNEP)	4
German Albums (Offizielle Top 100)	2
Greek Albums (IFPI)	1
Italian Albums (FIMI)	15
Japanese Albums (Oricon)	16
Mexican Albums (Top 100 Mexico)	93
New Zealand Albums (RMNZ)	12
Norwegian Albums (VG-lista)	17
Polish Albums (ZPAV)	11
Portuguese Albums (AFP)	12
Russian Albums (2M)	19
Scottish Albums (OCC)	20
Slovenian Albums (Slo Top 30)	10
South Korean Albums (Gaon)	100
Spanish Albums (Promusicae)	14
Swedish Albums (Sverigetopplistan)	31
Swiss Albums (Schweizer Hitparade)	2
UK Albums (OCC)	13
US Billboard 200	26
US Top Rock Albums (Billboard)	8

=== Year-end charts ===
Year-end chart performance for SuperHeavy
Chart (2011)	Position
Austrian Albums (Ö3 Austria)	54
Dutch Albums (Album Top 100)	57
French Albums (SNEP)	199
German Albums (Offizielle Top 100)	90

== Release history ==
Release history for SuperHeavy
Region	Date	Edition(s)	Label	Ref.
Australia	16 September 2011	Standard	Universal	
Poland	16 September 2011	Standard	Universal	
Germany	16 September 2011	Standard; deluxe	Polydor	
Ireland	16 September 2011	Standard; deluxe	A&M	
United Kingdom	19 September 2011	Standard; deluxe	A&M	
India	19 September 2011	Standard; deluxe	Universal	
United States	20 September 2011	Standard; deluxe	Universal Republic	
Japan	21 September 2011	Deluxe	Universal	
Australia	23 September 2011	Deluxe	Universal	
